= John Randolph Tucker (professor) =

American law professor (1879–1954)

J. Randolph Tucker
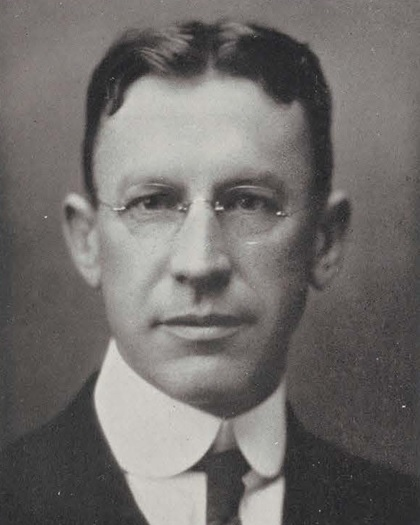
- Portrait of Tucker, c. 1923
- Born: John Randolph Tucker; October 29, 1879; Staunton, Virginia, U.S.
- Died: June 12, 1954 (aged 74); Richmond, Virginia, U.S.
- Burial place: Hollywood Cemetery
- Education: Tulane University (BA); Washington and Lee University (LLB)
- Occupations: Lawyer; professor
- Spouse: Mary Byrd Harrison (m. 1911)
- Children: 2, including J. Randolph Jr.
- Father: Henry S. Tucker III

John Randolph Tucker (October 29, 1879 – June 12, 1954) was an American lawyer and law professor who established the county manager form of government in Henrico County, Virginia.

== Early and family life ==
Tucker was born in Staunton, Virginia on October 29, 1879, to Henry St. George Tucker III and his wife, Henrietta Preston Johnston. His father Henry St. George Tucker was the fourth generation of distinguished lawyers and judges in the family, and this John Tucker (named after his lawyer/politician grandfather John Randolph Tucker (1823–1897) would become the fifth generation of lawyers in the family. Henry Tucker moved his family to Lexington, Virginia when John was young. The father practiced as well as taught law at Washington and Lee University, and also served as U.S. Representative from 1889 to 1897 and from 1922 to 1932. Young John Tucker attended Tulane University (where his maternal grandfather had served as its first president) as well as Washington and Lee University. He graduated from the Washington and Lee law school in 1902 and spent a year doing postgraduate work at the Harvard Law School.

John Tucker married Mary Byrd Harrison, a daughter of former state delegate Carter H. Harrison, in 1911. Their daughter married Francis Thornton Greene and lived in Warrenton, Virginia and their son J. Randolph Tucker Jr. (nicknamed "Bunny"; 1914–2015) would become a lawyer and member of the Virginia House of Delegates from 1950 to 1958 state senator and later a judge of the Circuit Court of the City of Richmond. The senior John Tucker was also an active member of St. Stephen's Episcopal Church, serving both on the vestry and as junior and senior warden.

== Legal career ==
Upon being admitted to the Virginia bar in 1903, John Randolph Tucker began private practice in Staunton, but soon moved to Richmond to become an associate at Munford, Hunton, Williams and Anderson (which much later became Hunton Andrews Kurth). There he worked under the firm's founding partners, Beverley B. Munford, Eppa Hunton Jr., E. Randolph Williams, and Henry W. Anderson, and alongside fellow-associate Thomas B. Gay. Tucker left in 1909 and established a partnership with John B. Lightfoot Jr., which he left to become counsel for the Virginia State Corporation Commission from 1919 until 1923. He then formed a partnership, Tucker and Bronson, which later evolved into Tucker, Mays, Cabell and Moore (and even later, Mays, Valentine, Davenport and Moore, which in 2001 merged into Troutman Sanders). This law firm became one of Richmond's leading law and lobbying firms. Tucker served as general counsel and a member of the board of directors of the Virginia Trust Company, and counsel for the Virginia Bankers Association from 1933 until his death.

For fifteen years (1909-1925), Tucker taught as an adjunct professor of law at the University of Richmond School of Law, with a brief absence during World War I. He published "Personal Liability of One Assuming Payment of a Deed of Trust", 4 Va.L.Rev. 464-85 (1917), and taught various courses relating to business and constitutional law, as well as insurance, bailment, wills and administration, and equity procedures.

== Death and legacy ==
As President of the Henrico Citizens League, Tucker led efforts to adopt a county manager form of government in Henrico County, which caused the Board of Supervisors to name John Randolph Tucker High School in his honor after his death, which occurred in Richmond, Virginia on June 12, 1954. Tucker is buried at Hollywood Cemetery in Richmond.
