= Eppa Hunton IV =

American lawyer (1904–1976)

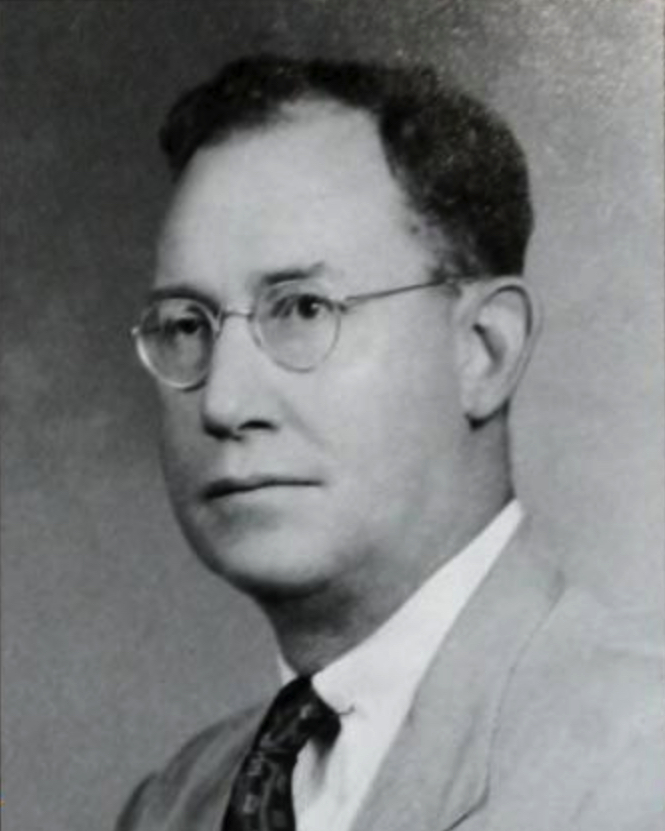
- Portrait of Hunton, c. 1950s
- Born: July 31, 1904; Richmond, Virginia, U.S.
- Died: November 23, 1976 (aged 72); Richmond, Virginia, U.S.
- Burial place: Hollywood Cemetery; 37°31′54.2″N 77°27′36″W
- Education: University of Virginia (BA, LLB)
- Occupation: Lawyer
- Political party: Democratic
- Spouse: Caroline Homassel Marye (m. 1936; died 1962)
- Children: 3
- Father: Eppa Hunton Jr.
- Eppa Hunton IV's voice Arguing before the U.S. Supreme Court for Seaboard Air Line Railroad in the case U.S. v. Seaboard Air Line R.R. Co. Recorded October 19, 1959

Eppa Hunton IV (July 31, 1904 – November 23, 1976) was an American lawyer. A native of Richmond, Virginia, he graduated from the University of Virginia and its law school before returning to his hometown, where, excepting his overseas military service in World War II, he resided the remainder of his life. The only son of Eppa Hunton Jr., in 1927 he joined the firm his father co-founded—Hunton, Williams, Anderson & Gay (now Hunton Andrews Kurth)—and practiced corporate law, eventually becoming a senior partner.

Hunton was an influential figure in Richmond society for nearly half a century. He was a longtime director of the First & Merchants Bank, was active in Democratic politics, served for many years on the boards of visitors of the Medical College of Virginia and Virginia Commonwealth University, including a period as rector of the latter, and held membership in a multitude of civic and cultural organizations.

== Early life and family ==
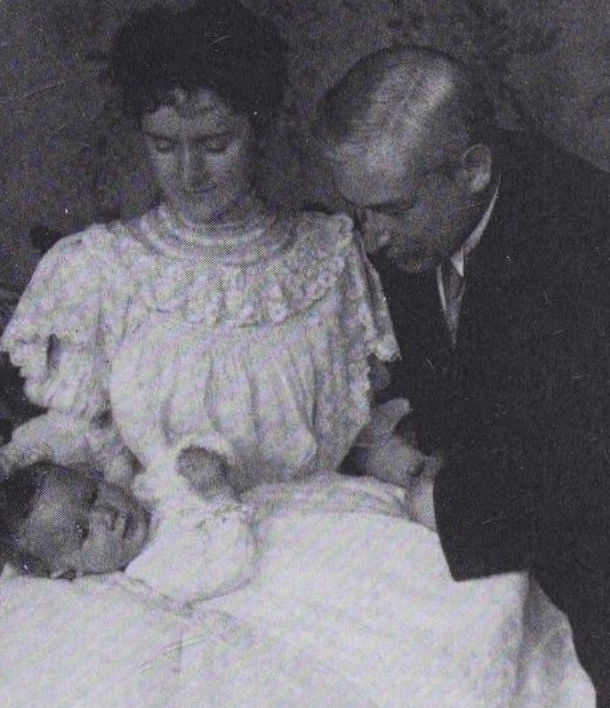
An eight-month-old Hunton posing with his parents, Eppa Hunton Jr. and Virginia Semmes Hunton, in the spring of 1905

=== Childhood and education ===
Hunton was born on July 31, 1904, in Richmond, Virginia, the only son of the former Virginia Semmes Payne (1867–1941) and Eppa Hunton Jr. (1855–1932), a prominent local attorney. The elder Hunton had moved south with his wife and father from Warrenton, Virginia, just three years earlier to found a legal practice with Beverley B. Munford, E. Randolph Williams, and Henry W. Anderson. Both of the younger Hunton's grandfathers, Eppa Hunton and William H. F. Payne, were brigadier generals in the Confederate States Army during the American Civil War, and both served in public office after the war, the former in the United States House of Representatives and United States Senate and the latter in the Virginia House of Delegates. He was christened at St. James' Episcopal Church in Warrenton by Bishop Alfred Magill Randolph.

Hunton matriculated at the private, all-boy Chamberlayne School in Richmond (today known as St. Christopher's) and Episcopal High School in Alexandria, followed by the University of Virginia, from which he graduated with a Bachelor of Arts in 1925. He then attended the University of Virginia School of Law, earning a Bachelor of Laws in 1927. Among the law school's professors at the time were Charles A. Graves, William Minor Lile, and Armistead Dobie. While in Charlottesville, Hunton was a member of the Delta Kappa Epsilon fraternity, like his father, the legal honor society Phi Delta Phi, and the Eli Banana secret society. He was an assistant manager of the university's football team during its 1923 season.

=== Marriage ===
Hunton married Caroline Homassel Marye at St. Paul's Episcopal Church on September 28, 1936, in a ceremony officiated by Beverley D. Tucker Jr. and Arthur B. Kinsolving. Dr. Kinloch Nelson, a college classmate and the future dean of the Virginia Commonwealth University School of Medicine, served as his best man. A reception followed at the home of the bride's parents on Monument Avenue, after which the couple sailed from New York City to Europe for their honeymoon. They went on to have three children: Caroline, Virginia, and Eppa V.

== Career ==
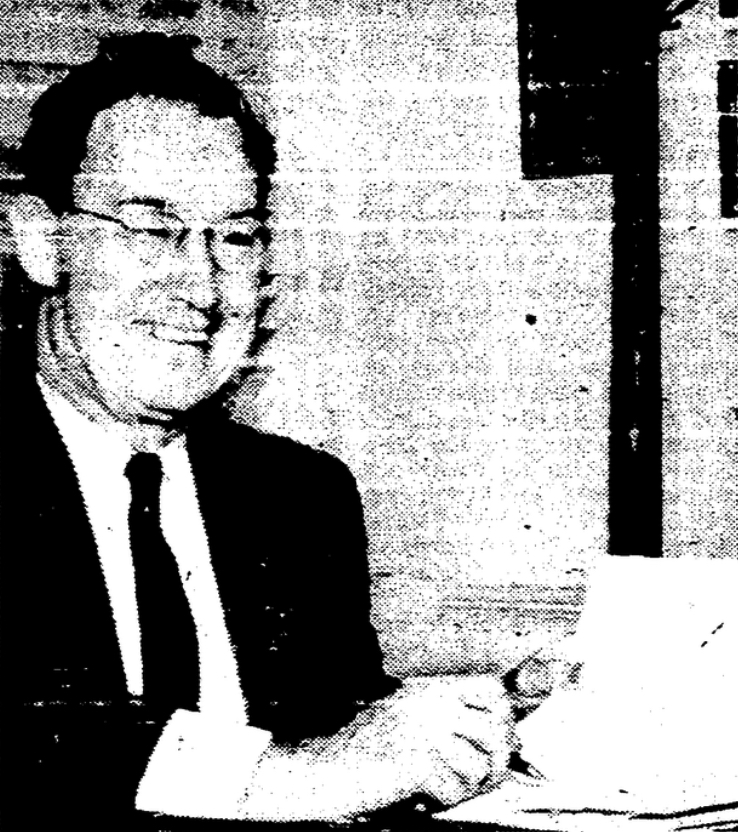
Hunton in his office at Hunton, Williams, Gay, Powell & Gibson in 1960

=== Law, banking, and business ===
Hunton was admitted to the Virginia bar in 1926 and joined the law firm his father co-founded, then known as Hunton, Williams, Anderson & Gay, in September of the following year, shortly after his graduation from law school. He was promoted to partner in June 1934. Other named partners included Thomas B. Gay and Lewis F. Powell Jr., before the firm adopted the name Hunton & Williams on April 1, 1976.

In addition to holding official roles as a rotating member and, later, as chair of the firm's executive committee from 1960 to 1974, Hunton was described by Powell as the firm's "social chairman." He was widely adored as a unifying force in the firm and as the custodian of its social traditions. A friend said that, in the courtroom, he relied on "soft persuasion and a gracious manner of the Old South to get the jury to go along with him," and a fellow partner opined that "he would fit into the scene of the last century much more easily than most of us." Clients he managed included the Seaboard Air Line Railroad, the Life Insurance Company of Virginia, Stewart-Warner, and the Virginia Hospital Association. He was admitted to the bar of the Supreme Court of the United States on May 27, 1935, and argued a case before the Warren Court on behalf of Seaboard Air Line in 1959.

Hunton was, from 1932 until his death, a director of the First & Merchants National Bank, one of the largest financial institutions in the state, and, from 1968, a director of the First & Merchants Corporation. He was a vice president and counsel of the Boulevard Bridge Corporation.

=== Civic life ===
In 1933, Hunton campaigned as a Democrat for one of Richmond's six seats in the Virginia House of Delegates, running on a liberal platform that included support for the repeal of the Eighteenth Amendment to the United States Constitution. Despite a respectable showing in the crowded party primary election, besting around three-quarters of the other 29 candidates, he was unsuccessful in securing a spot on the November general election ballot. He was elected to the Richmond City Democratic Committee from Lee Ward in August 1939, receiving more votes than any other candidate. A year later, he tendered his resignation to chair Robert T. Barton Jr., citing his disapproval of Franklin D. Roosevelt's campaign for a third term in the 1940 presidential election but expressing his commitment towards seeing down-ballot Democratic candidates elected.

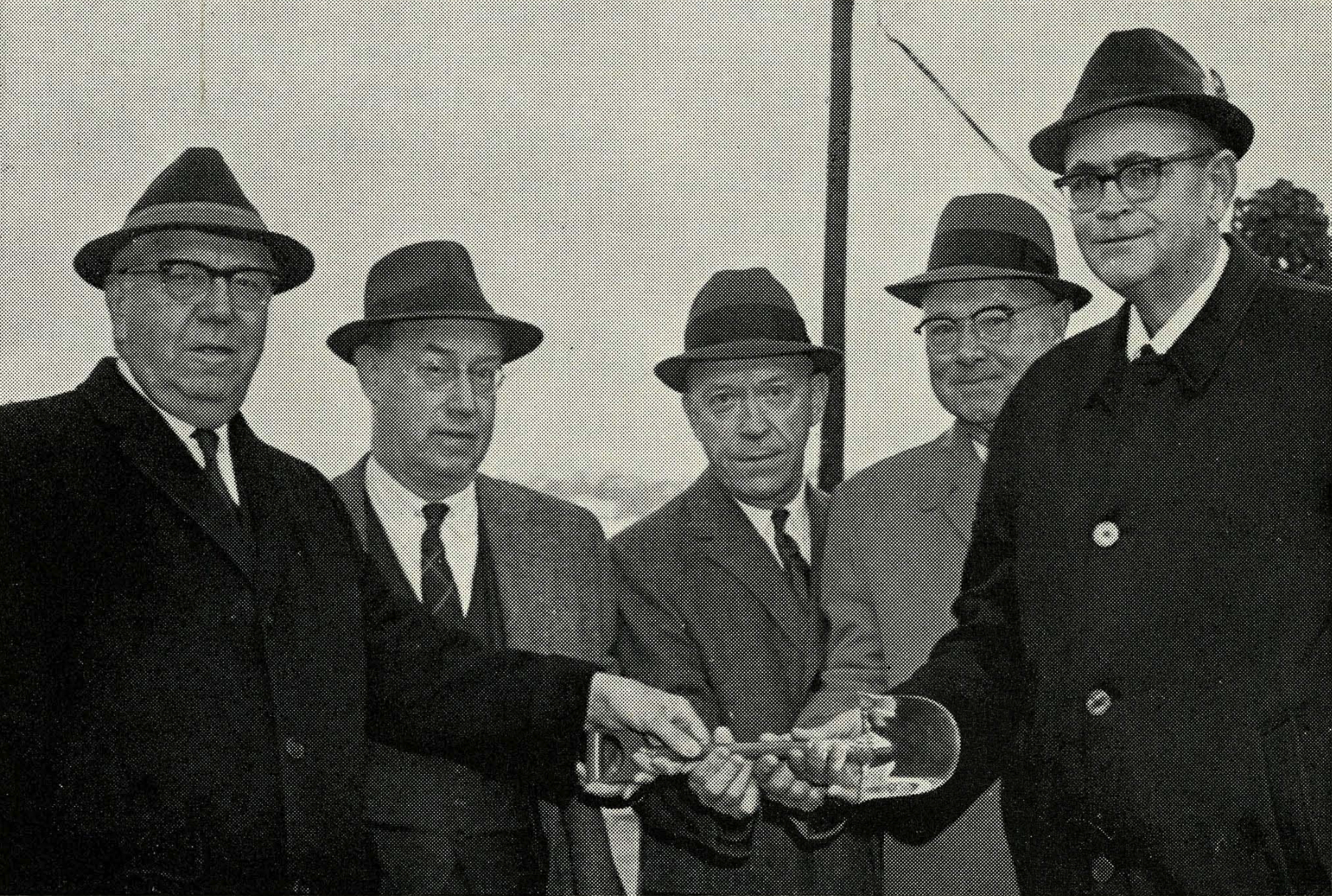
Representatives of the Medical College of Virginia at the groundbreaking for the school's second dental building in 1967. Hunton is second from the left.

Hunton was long associated with the Medical College of Virginia (MCV) and Virginia Commonwealth University (VCU). He was first appointed to the board of visitors of MCV in 1932 by Governor John Garland Pollard, in the place of his deceased father, and served until 1951. During World War II, he served as an adjutant in North Africa and Italy with the United States Army's 45th General Hospital, a unit staffed by MCV faculty. He was awarded the Bronze Star Medal and was discharged with the rank of major. During his service, he contracted an eye disease, which caused him to lose almost all vision in one eye. He was later reappointed to three further four-year terms on the MCV board: from 1954 to 1958, from 1959 to 1963, and from 1964 to 1968. He was chair of the board from 1960 to 1963.

In 1967, Hunton served on Virginia's Commission to Plan for the Establishment of a Proposed State-Supported University in the Richmond Metropolitan Area, known unofficially as the "Wayne Commission", which recommended the merger of MCV and the Richmond Professional Institute to form VCU. Once the school was established, he was appointed to its board of visitors by Mills Godwin. Virginius Dabney was appointed the first rector of the university and faced student protests due to his association with the Byrd Machine and massive resistance; he ultimately resigned on July 31, 1969. Hunton was appointed to succeed him and served until his own resignation in September 1970, citing conflicts of interest arising out of his firm's representation of the school over the years.

Hunton served for many years on the boards of the Confederate Memorial Literary Society and Confederate Memorial Association. In 1946, he helped oversee the merger of the latter with the Virginia Historical Society; he was a member of that organization's board from then until his death and was its president from 1966 to 1969. In 1933, he was appointed a member of the Founders Committee of the Virginia Museum of Fine Arts. He was a member of the American and Virginia Bar Associations, the Society of the Cincinnati, the Commonwealth Club, and the Country Club of Virginia. He was a longtime vestryman and senior warden of St. Paul's Episcopal Church.

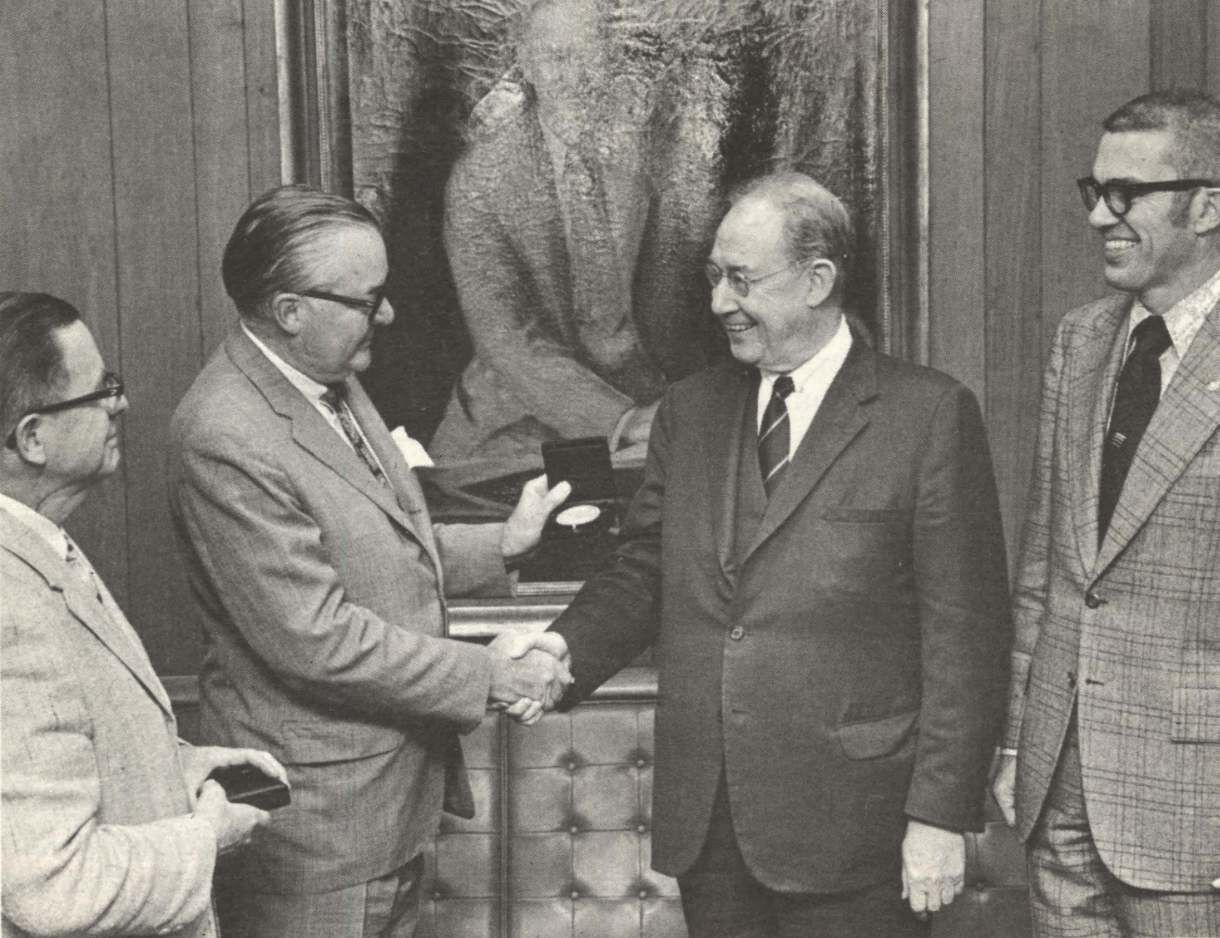
Hunton receiving VCU's Wayne Medal in 1971. From left to right are: Edward A. Wayne; Robert A. Wilson, university rector; Hunton; and Dr. Warren W. Brandt, university president.

== Later life and death ==
In 1971, Hunton was awarded the inaugural Edward A. Wayne Medal for distinguished service to VCU. Wayne was chair of the Wayne Commission and a former president of the Federal Reserve Bank of Richmond. On May 15, 1976, at VCU's spring commencement, Hunton and Virginius Dabney were awarded the school's first honorary degrees: a Doctor of Laws for Hunton and a Doctor of Humane Letters for Dabney.

On November 23, 1976, at approximately 7:00 pm, a truck collided with Hunton's car on River Road, close to his home in Henrico County. He was taken to St. Mary's Hospital in Richmond, where he died at 7:50 pm of injuries caused by the accident. Following services at St. Paul's Church, he was buried in Hollywood Cemetery, alongside his wife, who preceded him in death fourteen years earlier, his parents, and his paternal grandparents.

The year after his death, Hunton & Williams established the Eppa Hunton IV Memorial Book Award at the University of Virginia School of Law, which is presented annually to a third-year student "who has demonstrated unusual aptitude in litigation courses and shown a keen awareness and understanding of the lawyer’s ethical and professional responsibility". In 1989, VCU named the First Baptist Church building Hunton Hall (now the Hunton Student Center) in honor of Hunton and his father for their many years of service to MCV and VCU.

In 1996, Hunton's former residence at 6705 River Road, designed by William Lawrence Bottomley, was moved from Henrico to the campus of the University of Richmond, where it is now the centerpiece of the Jepson Alumni Center.

Business positions
Preceded by Thomas B. Gay	Chair of the Executive Committee of Hunton, Williams, Gay & Gibson; 1960–1974	Succeeded by John W. Riely
Non-profit organization positions
Preceded by David J. Mays	President of the Virginia Historical Society; 1966–1969	Succeeded by Virginius Dabney
Academic offices
Preceded by Samuel M. Bemiss	Chair of the Board of Visitors of the Medical College of Virginia; 1960–1963	Succeeded by Buford Scott
Preceded by Virginius Dabney	Rector of the Board of Visitors of Virginia Commonwealth University; 1969–1970	Succeeded by Robert A. Wilson
