= Hunton =

Hunton, as a person, may refer to:

- Addie Waites Hunton (1866–1943), American suffragist, race and gender activist, and educator
- Emma Hunton (born 1991), American musical theatre actress (Spring Awakening, Next to Normal, RENT, Witness Uganda, Wicked)
- Eppa Hunton (1822-1908), an American politician and general
- Eppa Hunton Jr. (1855-1932), American attorney
- Eppa Hunton IV (1904-1976), American attorney
- Eunice Hunton Carter (1899-1970), American lawyer and activist
- John C. Hunton (1839-1928), American Confederate veteran, pioneer, and rancher
- Philip Hunton (c.1600-1682), English clergyman and political writer
- W. Alphaeus Hunton, Jr. (1903–1970), American academic, activist, leftist, expatriate

Hunton, as a place, may refer to:

- Hunton, Hampshire, a small village near Winchester, Hampshire, England
- Hunton, Kent, England
- Hunton, North Yorkshire, a village in Richmondshire, North Yorkshire, England

Hunton, as a company, may refer to:

- Hunton Andrews Kurth LLP, formerly known as Hunton & Williams LLP, a U.S. law firm
