= Alexander Sands =

Alexander Sands may refer to:

- Alex Sands (1870–?), footballer who played for Port Vale
- Alexander Hamilton Sands (1828–1887), American lawyer, writer, and Baptist minister
