= Alexander Hamilton Sands =

American lawyer (1828–1887)

Alexander Hamilton Sands (1828–1887) was a Virginia lawyer, writer, and Baptist minister.

== Early life ==
Born in Williamsburg, Virginia, Sands could trace his ancestry to Thomas Sands of Williamsburg, who married Mary Gilliatt, the daughter of the superior court clerk in Richmond. When he was ten years old, Sands began attending the College of William & Mary, and four years later moved to Richmond. The death of his father in 1842 prompted the move, and he entered the law office of his brother William G. Sands, who was the clerk of the Superior Court of Law and Chancery in the City of Richmond. He read the law under the tutelage of his brother and Superior Court Judge Robertson.

== Legal career ==
Admitted to the Virginia bar on April 13, 1849, at the age of twenty-one, Sands eventually became a prominent lawyer in the Commonwealth of Virginia, particularly in the intricacies of chancery practice. During the American Civil War, he served as a judge-advocate.

Sands and John Howard shared a practice known as Howard & Sands. This founding law practice eventually became the law firm of Sands Anderson PC.*Sands Anderson PC Law Firm Founded by A. Scott Anderson and Alexander Hamilton Sands

== Religious career ==
Just before the American Civil War Mr. Sands was ordained as a Baptist minister, and he established churches in Ashland and Glen Allen for African Americans and served as their pastor. For the rest of his life he preached on Sundays and practiced law during the week. Mr. Sands was a delegate to the Virginia Secession Convention (held in 1861). In the early 1880s, Mr. Sands practiced law with his son Conway in a firm known as Sands & Sands, and he continued the practice of law up until shortly before his death on December 22, 1887.

== Literary career ==
Alexander Sands was a prolific writer. For several years he edited the Evening Bulletin, a paper published in the City of Richmond, and during the absence of Jno. R. Thompson in Europe, he edited the Southern Literary Messenger. He was also editor of the Quarterly Law Review, published in Richmond, and contributed articles to the Methodist Quarterly Review, the Christian Review, the Religious Herald, and many other religious papers. In addition to these published works, he authored the following books: “History of a Suit in Equity” (1854 and 1882); “Recreations of a Southern Barrister” (1860); “Alexander Tate's American Form Book” (1857); “Practical Law Forms” (1872); “Hubbell's Legal Directory of Virginia Laws”; “Sermons by a Village Pastor”; and “A Constitutional History of Virginia” (not printed). Through his literary interest he met and befriended noted author, and U.S. Ambassador to Italy, Thomas Nelson Page.

== Personal life ==
Sands married Ella V. Goddin, daughter of prominent Richmond businessman Wellington Goddin. Their sons William Hamilton Sands, Conway Robinson Sands and Alexander Hamilton Sands also became lawyers and joined their father's practice (except when C.R. Sands and later A.H. Sands served as Henrico County Commonwealth attorney), and Tucker Sands became a banker in Washington, D.C. and daughters married
