= William Wehrum =

American lawyer (born 1964)

Bill Wehrum
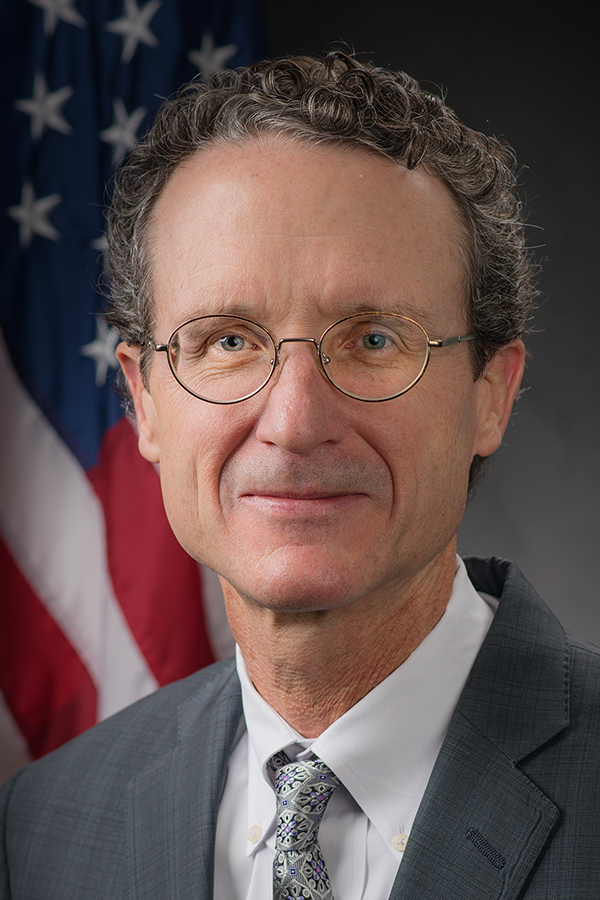
- Official portrait, 2017

Assistant Administrator of the Environmental Protection Agency for Air and Radiation
- In office November 20, 2017 – June 30, 2019
- President: Donald Trump
- Preceded by: Janet McCabe (acting)
- Succeeded by: Sarah Dunham (acting)
- Acting; August 2005 – June 1, 2007
- President: George W. Bush
- Preceded by: Jeffrey R. Holmstead
- Succeeded by: Robert Meyers (acting)

Personal details
- Born: William Ludwig Wehrum Jr. February 26, 1964 (age 62) Memphis, Tennessee, U.S.
- Party: Republican
- Spouse: Cynthia Jean Longobardi
- Education: Purdue University (BS); Widener University (JD)
- Occupation: Lawyer

William Ludwig Wehrum Jr. (born February 26, 1964) is an American attorney, lobbyist, and government official who served as Assistant Administrator of the Environmental Protection Agency for Air and Radiation in the first Donald Trump administration.

Prior to his role at the EPA, he was a partner and the head of the administrative law group at Hunton & Williams, where he lobbied on behalf on major industrial companies and advocated for looser environmental regulations.

== Early life and education ==
Wehrum was born in Memphis, Tennessee on February 26, 1964. He attended Purdue University, receiving a Bachelor of Science degree in electrical engineering in 1986, followed by the Widener University School of Law (today known as Widener University Delaware Law School).

== Career ==
After George W. Bush took office in 2001, Wehrum became Counsel to the EPA's Acting Assistant Administrator for Air and Radiation. From 2005 to 2007, he served as the Principal Deputy Assistant Administrator (and acting Assistant Administrator) for the office. He was nominated by President Bush in 2006 to become Assistant Administrator of the EPA for Air and Radiation, but his nomination was blocked by Senate Democrats.

According to The New York Times, "Wehrum worked for the better part of a decade to weaken air pollution rules by fighting the Environmental Protection Agency in court on behalf of chemical manufacturers, refineries, oil drillers and coal-burning power plants." Wehrum's clients included Koch Industries, the American Petroleum Institute, the American Fuel and Petrochemical Manufacturers, the Brick Industry Association, and the Utility Air Regulatory Group. While serving in the Trump administration, Wehrum pushed for rollback of environmental regulations at the EPA, while, according to the New York Times, he "at times continued to interact with former clients, despite an ethics rule that prohibits former industry lawyers and lobbyists from meeting with former clients in private settings to discuss government-related matters for two years."

The House Energy and Commerce Committee launched an investigation on April 11, 2019, into whether Wehrum had improperly aided his former industry clients since joining the administration. The Committee investigated the Utility Utility Air Regulatory Group (UARG), asking for more information on how the committee operates and whether Wehrum was continuing to "illicitly serve" his old client in his new capacity at the EPA.

In addition to his work to change how the EPA calculates the number of deaths attributed to fine particulate matter, Wehrum has been reported to be instrumental in a proposal released in 2018 to "dramatically weaken a major environmental regulation covering mercury, a toxic chemical emitted from coal-burning power plants." Exposure to mercury, even in small amounts, may cause serious health problems, and is a threat to the development of babies and fetuses.

The EPA Inspector General released a report in 2021 that found that Wehrum blocked plans by local EPA officials in the summer of 2018 to warn the public about a cancer-causing gas in their neighborhood caused by a Sterigenics facility. The facility sterilized medical equipment using the chemical ethylene oxide, a chemical the government says is linked to lymphoma, leukemia, stomach, and breast cancers.

Wehrum left the EPA on June 30, 2019.
