= J. Taylor Stratton =

American politician

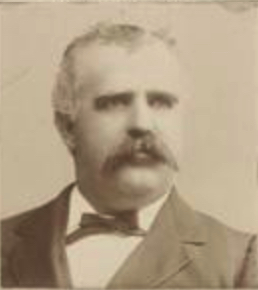

Member of the Virginia House of Delegates from Richmond City
- In office December 2, 1891 – December 6, 1893 Serving with John Jackson, Beverley B. Munford, & George B. Steel
- Preceded by: Levin Joynes
- Succeeded by: Beverley T. Crump

Personal details
- Born: James Taylor Stratton c. 1844 Appomattox, Virginia, U.S.
- Died: July 17, 1918 (aged 74) Richmond, Virginia, U.S.
- Party: Democratic

Military service
- Allegiance: Confederate States
- Branch/service: Confederate States Army
- Years of service: 1863–1865
- Rank: Private
- Battles/wars: American Civil War

James Taylor Stratton (c. 1844 – July 17, 1918) was an American politician who served in the Virginia House of Delegates.
