= A. Scott Anderson =

American politician (1904–1971)

64th Mayor of Richmond, Virginia
- In office 1958–1960
- Preceded by: F. Henry Garber
- Succeeded by: Claude W. Woodward

Personal details
- Born: Alfred Scott Anderson, Jr. July 24, 1904 Crewe, Virginia, U.S.
- Died: November 12, 1971 (aged 67) Williamsburg, Virginia, U.S.
- Resting place: Hollywood Cemetery
- Party: Democratic
- Spouse: Ann Curd
- Children: 3
- Education: College of William & Mary

Alfred Scott Anderson Jr. (July 24, 1904 – November 12, 1971) was an American politician, who was mayor of Richmond, Virginia from 1958 to 1960 and served on the City Council for the City of Richmond, Virginia from 1956 to 1960 and 1963–1966. Anderson, who was too old for military service, served in the Home Guard during World War II.

== Legal career ==
In 1960, Anderson left the law firm of Bowles, Anderson, Boyd, Clarke & Herrod to join Mr. Alexander Hamilton Sands in the formation of Sands, Anderson, Marks & Clarke, whose offices were initially in the American Building. This law firm eventually became Sands Anderson PC.

== Personal life ==
Anderson married Ann Curd. They had two daughters and a son, Mrs. Anderson Gwynne, Mrs. J. Richard Carling and Alfred Bryce.

Anderson died on November 12, 1971, in Williamsburg. He was buried in Hollywood Cemetery.
