= Julian Bryant =

American politician (1866–1932)

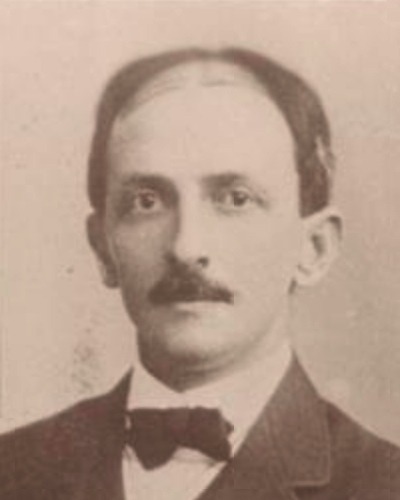

Member of the Virginia Senate from the 35th district
- In office December 4, 1901 – January 10, 1906
- Preceded by: Conway R. Sands
- Succeeded by: T. Ashby Wickham

Member of the Virginia House of Delegates from Richmond City
- In office December 6, 1893 – December 1, 1897
- Preceded by: John Jackson
- Succeeded by: Elben C. Folkes

Personal details
- Born: May 13, 1866 Powhatan, Virginia, U.S.
- Died: October 1, 1932 (aged 66) Covington, Virginia, U.S.
- Party: Democratic
- Spouse(s): Elizabeth Bryant; Gladys Cole

Julian Bryant (May 13, 1866 – October 1, 1932) was an American politician who served in the Virginia House of Delegates and Virginia Senate. Later in life, he was elected Commonwealth's attorney of Craig and Alleghany counties.
