= George B. Steel =

American politician (1835–1916)

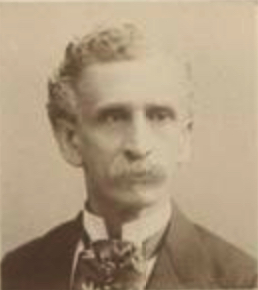

Member of the Virginia House of Delegates from Richmond City
- In office December 2, 1891 – December 6, 1893 Serving with John Jackson, Beverley B. Munford, & J. Taylor Stratton
- Preceded by: John A. Curtis
- Succeeded by: J. Alston Cabell

Personal details
- Born: George Boardman Steel; July 26, 1835 Richmond, Virginia, U.S.
- Died: August 29, 1916 (aged 81) Richmond, Virginia, U.S.
- Resting place: Hollywood Cemetery
- Party: Democratic

Military service
- Allegiance: Confederate States
- Branch/service: Confederate States Army
- Battles/wars: American Civil War

George Boardman Steel (July 26, 1835 – August 29, 1916) was an American politician who served in the Virginia House of Delegates.
