= Orie Latham Hatcher =

American educational reformer (1868–1946)

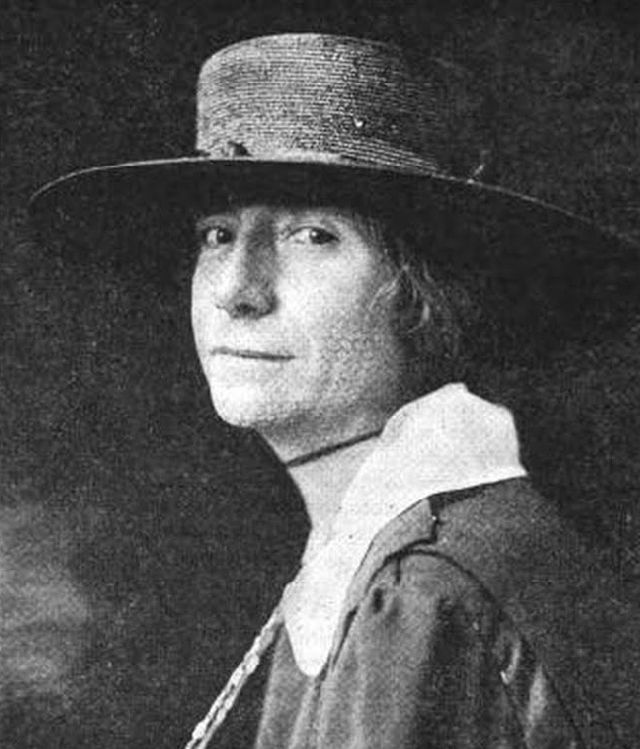
- Born: December 10, 1868; Petersburg, Virginia, U.S.
- Died: April 1, 1946 (aged 77); Richmond, Virginia, U.S.
- Resting place: Hollywood Cemetery
- Education: Vassar College; University of Chicago (PhD)

Orie Latham Hatcher (December 10, 1868 – April 1, 1946) was an American feminist educational reformer.

== Early life and education ==
She was born in Petersburg, Virginia, into an old and privileged Virginia family. Her mother, Orania Virginia Snead, was a trustee of Hartshorn Memorial College, a private college for African American women in Richmond, Virginia. The name Orie from the mother's Orania is what linguists call semihomonymous naming, and theirs is considered a notable example. She rarely used the name Orie, however, preferring to be referred to as Latham Hatcher (for her rural education work), O. L. Hatcher (for academic work), or O. Latham Hatcher (for both). Her father, William Eldridge Hatcher, founded Fork Union Military Academy, served as president of the board of trustees of Richmond College, and was a Baptist pastor. Latham Hatcher graduated from the Richmond Female Institute in 1884 at age 15. She earned a bachelor's degree at Vassar College in 1888, and then returned to Richmond to teach at her high school for one year; she would later oversee its transformation into the Women's College of Richmond, now subsumed into the University of Richmond. She earned a doctorate in English literature from the University of Chicago in 1903.

== Academic career ==
Hatcher taught at Bryn Mawr College in the Comparative and Elizabethan Literature department, receiving tenure in 1911 and serving as chair from 1910 to 1915. She published two academic books, John Fletcher: A Study in Dramatic Method, based on her doctoral thesis, and A Book for Shakespeare Plays and Pageants.

In 1914 she met in Richmond with Mary-Cooke Branch Munford and a group of influential women to discuss Southern women's education. Believing that her Virginia education had not adequately prepared her to study at Vassar and the University of Chicago, she resigned from Bryn Mawr in 1915 at age 47 to return to Virginia and champion higher educational standards for Southern women.

== Work as an educational reformer ==
As a result of the 1914 Richmond summit with Munford, they formed the Virginia Bureau of Vocations for Women, with Hatcher as its first president. In 1920 they changed its name to the Southern Woman's Educational Alliance, and in 1937 they changed it to the Alliance for Guidance of Rural Youth. She specifically pushed against the image of the Southern belle as only gaining an education to attract a husband. In 1917 the Alliance led to the founding of the Richmond School of Social Work and Public Health. World War I interrupted the work, but in June 1918, five months before it ended, she published an important article in The Nation, "The Virginia Man and the New Era for Women." In it she claimed that "Nowhere else in the South... has a certain conception of what a woman should be and do persisted so fervently as in Virginia." She later established chapters of the Alliance in New York and Chicago, receiving grants from Rockefeller and Carnegie, among others. 1920 the Alliance persuaded the Medical College of Virginia to admit women. From 1920 to 1924 she was initially Vice President of the National Federation of Business and Professional Women's Clubs, which the Alliance helped found, and she later become president. Hatcher studied Southern women's education scientifically, publishing the 1927 book Occupations for Women. She conducted a national survey at the beginning of the Great Depression in 1929. She published three studies in the same year, 1931, based on a study of 255 girls in 1927 that became Rural Girls in the City for Work. The latter documented for the first time how often women who left farms and other rural living situations to work in cities became the victims of sexual assault, particularly in boarding houses. The universities of North Carolina and Virginia allied with her work. She established a workshop at the Konnarock Training School where Virginia, Kentucky, North Carolina, and Tennessee meet, with a curriculum focusing on the needs of rural young women and including health. She chaired the rural section of the National Vocational Guidance Association from 1928 to 1938, and from 1932 to 1935 she was a member of the executive board of the National Council of Women. When the Alliance for the Guidance of Rural Youth met in Washington, DC in 1939, Eleanor Roosevelt and John Ward Studebaker were among the speakers. Hatcher became a consultant for the Youth Conference of the Department of the Interior, and a member of the White House Conference on Children in a Democracy.

In 1932 Hatcher convinced the photographer Doris Ullmann to document the people of Appalachia for the literature and fundraising of the Southern Woman's Educational Alliance, and Ullman agreed to take the commission. This funding helped open the Appalachia region to Ullman, and led her to create one of her most significant images, that of a racially mixed musical ensemble.

== Archives and special collections ==
Many of her papers are in the Rubenstein Rare Book and Manuscript Library of Duke University, including her collection of 481 rare Italian Renaissance books. As a comparative literature scholar she spoke modern Italian and read classical Italian. She purchased much of her collection on a 1907 book-buying trip to Italy. She was translating the work of the neo-Latin poet Manutan, and writing an unpublished book on him, but the outbreak of World War I in the summer of 1914 curtailed her trip to Mantua, Italy, and the project was dropped.

== Personal life ==
Hatcher died on April 1, 1946, at a hospital in Richmond. She was buried in Hollywood Cemetery.
