= John Jackson (Richmond politician) =

American politician (1848–1910)

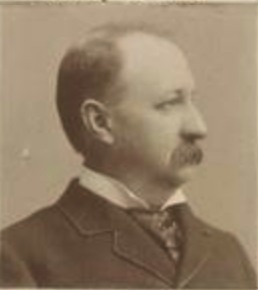

Member of the Virginia House of Delegates from Richmond City
- In office December 2, 1891 – December 6, 1893 Serving with Beverley B. Munford, George B. Steel, & J. Taylor Stratton
- Preceded by: Walter T. Booth
- Succeeded by: Julian Bryant

Personal details
- Born: November 1848 Lunenburg, Virginia, U.S.
- Died: June 4, 1910 (aged 61) Richmond, Virginia, U.S.
- Resting place: Hollywood Cemetery
- Party: Democratic
- Spouse: Helen Wray Turnbull

John Jackson (November 1848 – June 4, 1910) was an American politician who served in the Virginia House of Delegates.
