= Eppa Hunton Jr. =

American lawyer and politician (1855–1932)

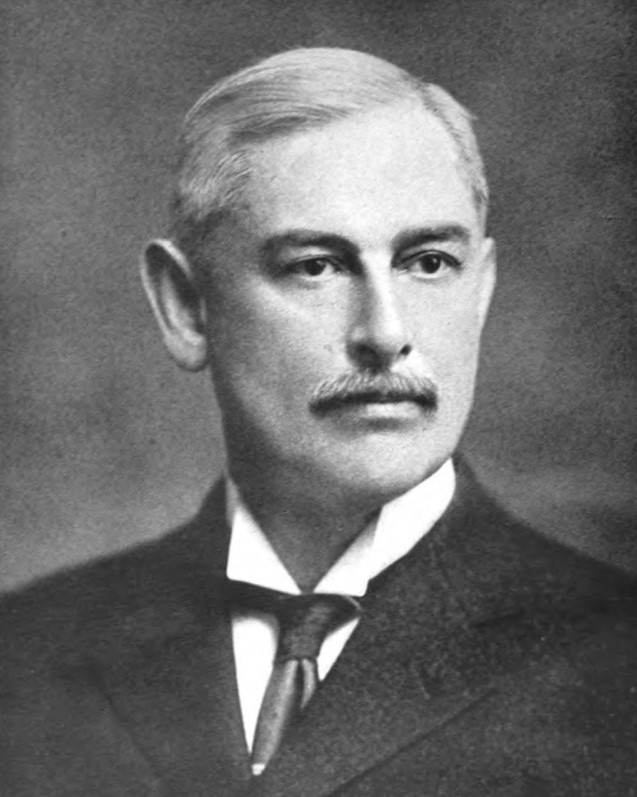
- Portrait of Hunton, c. 1916
- Born: Eppa Hunton III; April 14, 1855; Brentsville, Virginia, U.S.
- Died: March 5, 1932 (aged 76); Richmond, Virginia, U.S.
- Burial place: Hollywood Cemetery; 37°31′54.3″N 77°27′36.1″W
- Education: University of Virginia (LLB)
- Occupations: Lawyer; politician
- Political party: Democratic
- Spouses: Erva Winston Payne (m. 1884; died 1897); Virginia Semmes Payne (m. 1901)
- Children: 2, including Eppa IV
- Father: Eppa Hunton

Eppa Hunton III (April 14, 1855 – March 5, 1932), known as Eppa Hunton Jr., was an American lawyer, railroad executive, and politician. The son of Confederate general Eppa Hunton, he experienced a turbulent childhood with the American Civil War and Reconstruction as its backdrop. After graduating from the University of Virginia School of Law, he practiced law with his father in Warrenton, Virginia, for a number of years before moving south to Richmond in 1901 to help found the law firm Munford, Hunton, Williams & Anderson (later Hunton Andrews Kurth).

He served as president of the Virginia State Bar Association from 1915 to 1916, and, in 1920, he resigned from his firm to accept the presidency of the Richmond, Fredericksburg and Potomac Railroad, a position he held until his death in 1932. Like his father, he was active in politics, winning election to a term in the Virginia House of Delegates and as a delegate to the Virginia Constitutional Convention of 1901–02. He also served on the boards of visitors of the University of Virginia and Medical College of Virginia.

== Early life and family ==
=== Childhood and education ===
Hunton was born on April 14, 1855, in Brentsville, Virginia, the second child and only son of the former Lucy Caroline Weir (1825–1899) and Eppa Hunton II (1822–1908), who had been serving since 1849 as Prince William County's commonwealth's attorney. The elder Hunton, a slaveholder, was a presidential elector in 1860 for Southern Democrat John C. Breckinridge. The following year, he was elected as a pro-secession delegate to the Virginia Secession Convention, and, at the outbreak of the American Civil War, he was commissioned colonel of the Confederate States Army's 8th Virginia Infantry Regiment.

In March 1862, the Confederate Army evacuated northern Virginia to fight the Peninsula campaign. With Union soldiers about to reach Brentsville on their way to Richmond, Hunton and his family fled their estate early one morning, leaving behind most of their possessions and all but a few enslaved workers. Ill at the time, his mother had to be moved on a featherbed. Days later, advancing troops looted and burned the home. Hunton spent much of the next few years in Lynchburg, occasionally traveling to the front to stay with his father, who by 1863 had been promoted to brigadier general. After his father was captured in 1865, he relocated to Culpeper County, where he and his mother stayed at the home of his aunt.

After the war, Hunton and his family moved to Warrenton, Virginia, where he attended private boarding schools. His father won election to the United States House of Representatives in 1872. Hunton was sent away to attend the Bellevue High School in Bedford County, followed by the University of Virginia School of Law, where he joined the Delta Kappa Epsilon fraternity and studied under John B. Minor. He graduated with a Bachelor of Laws in 1877. Mere months earlier, congressional leaders agreed that the Electoral Commission (on which Hunton's father was the sole Southern member) would be allowed certify the election of Republican Rutherford B. Hayes to the presidency, in exchange for the withdrawal of the last federal troops from the South, ending the Reconstruction era.

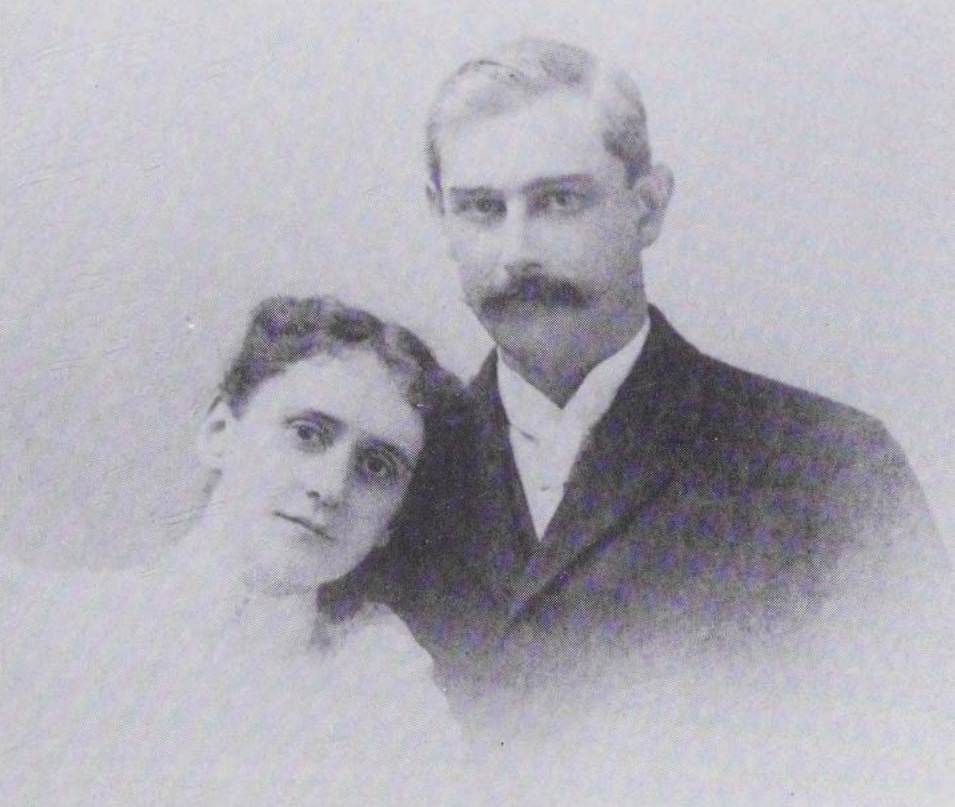
Hunton and his first wife, Erva

=== Marriages ===
Hunton married Minerva Winston "Erva" Payne, the eldest daughter of General William H. F. Payne, at St. James' Episcopal Church in Warrenton on November 18, 1884. The couple then took a train north for their honeymoon. Erva suffered from poor health, and, despite Hunton's efforts over the succeeding years to get her medical help, she died on October 9, 1897. Pallbearers at her funeral included Charles Minor Blackford, Henry Halleck, Fitzhugh Lee, Robert E. Lee Jr. and Joseph E. Willard. No children were borne from the marriage.

On April 24, 1901, Hunton married Virginia Semmes Payne, a younger sister of Erva, at St. James' Church in a wedding attended by many of the state's social and political elites. R. Walton Moore was his best man. A reception followed at the home of the bride's parents, after which the couple honeymooned in Atlantic City, New Jersey. They went on to have two children: a daughter, Mary Winter Hunton, who died shortly after her birth in 1902, and a son, Eppa Hunton IV, who was born in 1904.

== Career ==
=== Law ===
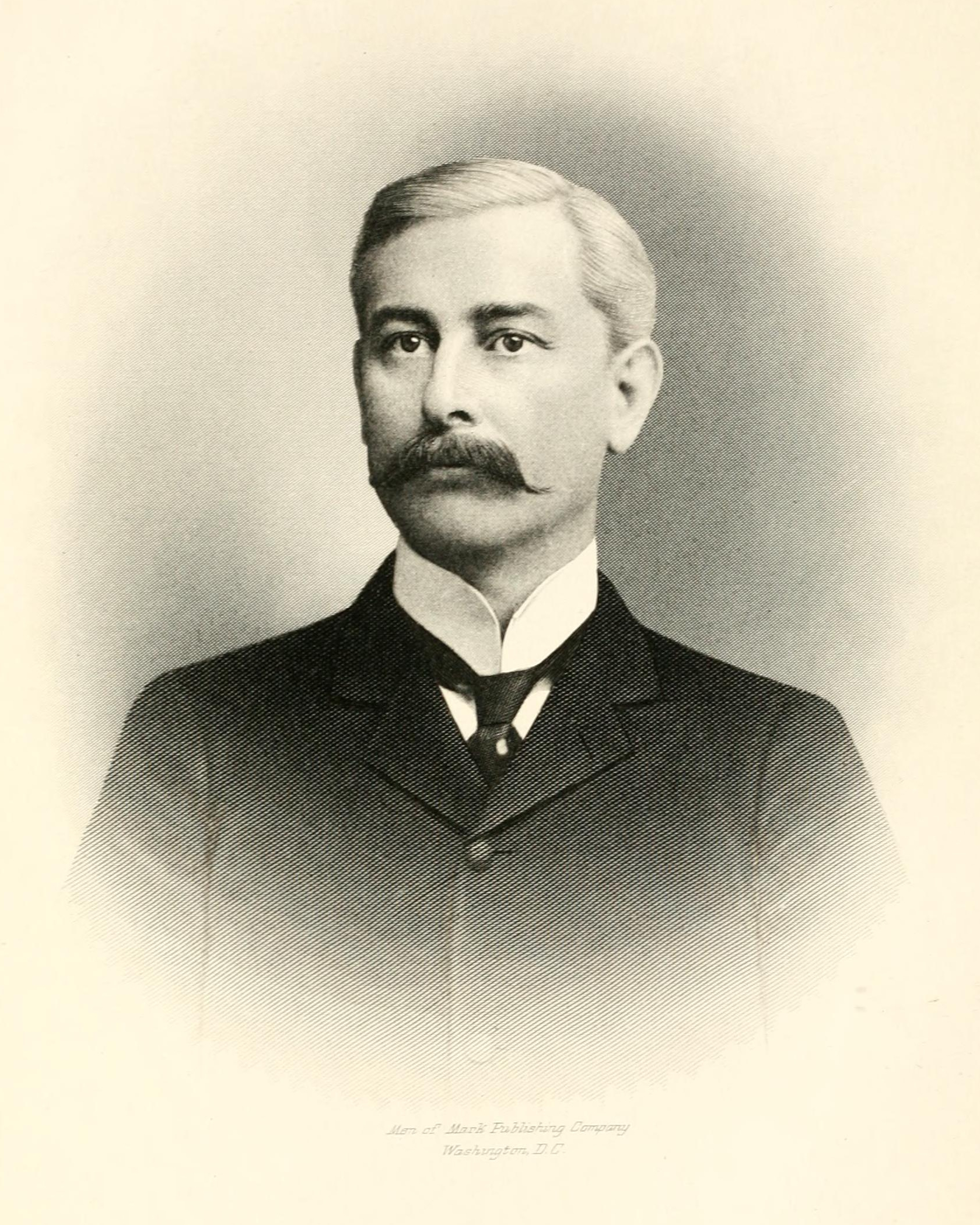
Lithograph of Hunton, as he appeared c. 1900

Hunton was admitted to the Virginia bar upon his graduation from law school in 1877. He practiced law with his father in Warrenton under the name Hunton & Son for the next 25 years, living at Brentmoor with his parents for most of this period. During his first few years as an attorney, Hunton worked to rebuild the practice his father had neglected after his election to Congress. Shortly after his father retired from Congress in 1881, the two concluded that there was not enough work in the area for the both of them and that the younger Hunton would continue to work in Warrenton while the elder Hunton would open up an office in Washington, D.C.

In 1901, while he was in Richmond as a member of the state's constitutional convention, Hunton was approached by the young lawyers E. Randolph Williams and Henry W. Anderson. Williams's law partner, William Wirt Henry, had died a few months before, and Anderson's, Beverley B. Munford, was suffering from ill health. Williams and Anderson proposed the creation of a new firm, modeled after the large, full-service firms of New York City, with Munford and Hunton at the helm as senior partners. After consulting with his father and meeting with his three partners in Washington in September, Hunton agreed to make his move to Richmond permanent, and Munford, Hunton, Williams & Anderson (later known as Hunton Andrews Kurth) was officially formed on November 1, 1901.

With his fellow senior partner ill, eventually dying of tuberculosis in 1910, Hunton took on most of the responsibility associated with building the reputation of the new firm. A particularly skillful lawyer with a notorious work ethic, he focused on corporate law and was involved in some of the most consequential litigation in the state. In 1905, he was appointed counsel to the receivers of the Virginia Passenger and Power Company. In 1910, he became a director of the First National Bank of Virginia, which eventually became First & Merchants Bank after a series of mergers. He was instrumental in the selection of Richmond as the fifth district location of the Federal Reserve. He served as general counsel of the Richmond, Fredericksburg and Potomac Railroad and the Washington Southern Railway, and, during World War I, when the country's railways were nationalized, he served as general counsel to the Director General of Railroads. In 1915, he was elected to a one-year term as president of the Virginia State Bar Association at the organization's annual meeting in White Sulphur Springs, West Virginia.

=== Politics ===
A member of the Democratic Party like his father before him, Hunton served as chair of the party's Fauquier County committee in 1886. In the succeeding years, he stumped numerous times for local Democratic candidates, often opposing William Mahone and his Readjuster Party. In 1893, he was elected to the Virginia House of Delegates as a floater delegate for the counties of Loudoun and Fauquier after running unopposed. While in the House, he led the effort to have his father reelected to a full term in the United States Senate against Thomas S. Martin and Fitzhugh Lee but was ultimately unsuccessful. He did not run for reelection. In 1899, he was one of a number of prominent Virginians who called for the direct election of United States senators from the state.

In early 1901, Hunton announced his intention to seek the Democratic nomination to the Fauquier County seat in the state constitutional convention to be held that June. He successfully challenged commonwealth's attorney James P. Jeffries, the choice of T. C. Pilcher's county political machine, in the party primary election and was nominated by acclamation at the succeeding convention. He defeated Republican W. K. Skinker in May in a race that was closer than expected. The constitutional convention was called for two primary reasons: to disenfranchise black voters after the passage of the Reconstruction Amendments and to curb the influence of corporations in state politics. In a speech delivered on securing the Democratic nomination, Hunton himself expressed his support for taking back suffrage from "ignorant" black voters. At the convention, he would later state that the participation of corporations in Virginia politics “ha[d] been demoralizing and debauching second only to the presence of the negro vote in the electorate”.

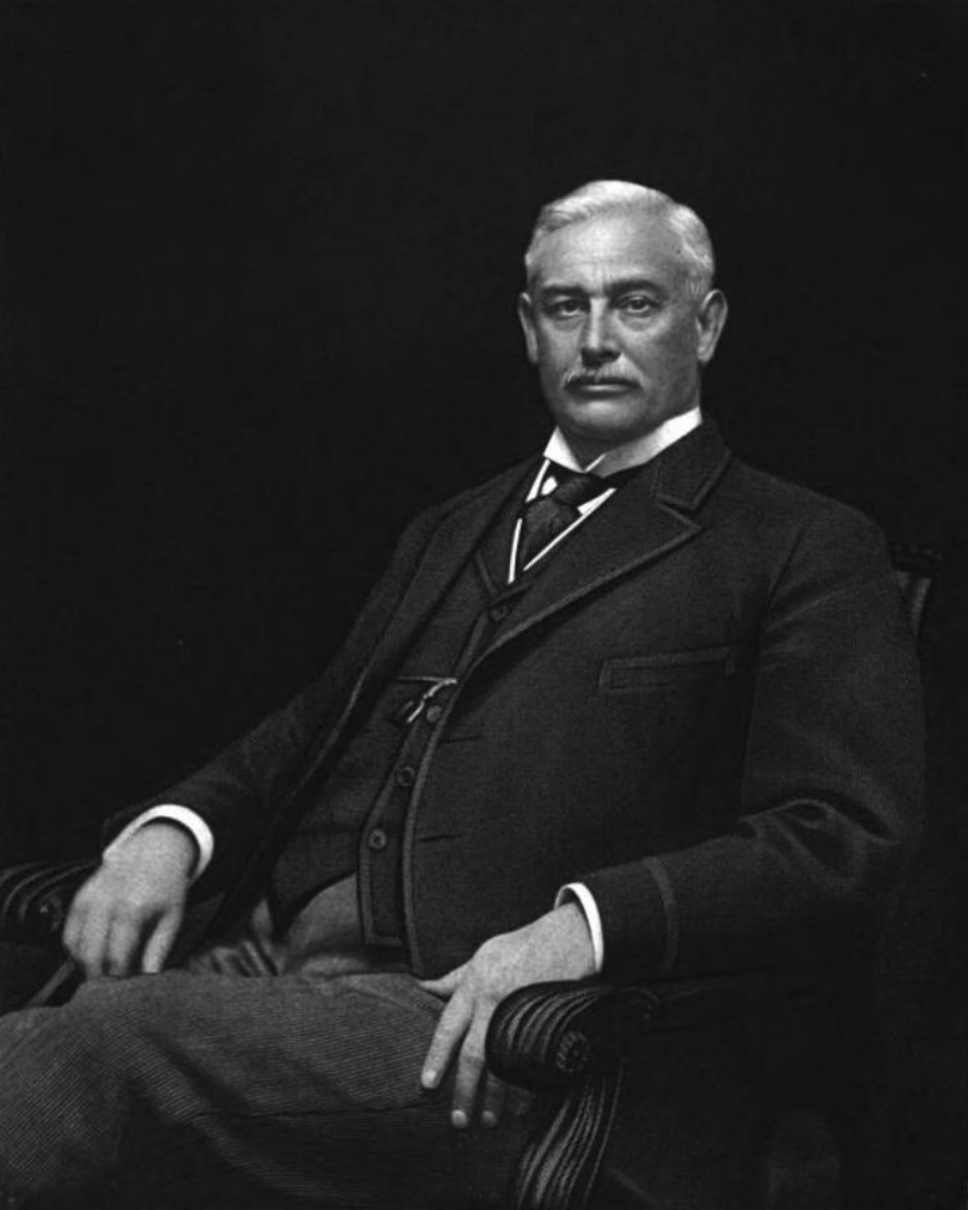
Lithographic portrait, c. 1915

On taking his seat, Hunton led the so-called "independent Democrats" in supporting John Goode for convention president over establishment favorite John W. Daniel. After Daniel declined to stand for the position, Goode won and appointed Hunton chair of the convention's Judiciary Committee. In this role, Hunton proposed the elimination of Virginia's county court system, in an effort to weed out local corruption. He would go on to vote for the adoption of the new constitution without a statewide referendum. After the convention, he expressed to his father his lack of interest in a political future, though he would continue to take stands on certain issues, such as his opposition to state alcohol prohibition laws during the 1910s.

=== Civic life ===
Hunton was a leading Richmond society figure during his three decades in that city. He was long associated with the Medical College of Virginia (MCV); when the school was negotiating a merger with the nearby University College of Medicine (UCM) in 1913, he served as counsel to MCV chief Dr. George Ben Johnston. At the insistence of both Johnston and UCM president Dr. Stuart McGuire, Hunton was one of the first members appointed to the school's new board of visitors by Governor William Hodges Mann. He was elected president of the board in 1925 and remained in that position until his death.

Hunton was also a member of the University of Virginia's board of visitors from 1902 to 1908 and its Alumni Board of Trustees from 1908 until his death. In the latter capacity, he was pitted against his former law partner's wife, Mary-Cooke Branch Munford, when he led opposition to the creation of a coordinate college of the university that would admit women. He was the president of the Confederate Memorial Association, a precursor to the Virginia Historical Society, and was a member of the Commonwealth Club and the Country Club of Virginia. He was a vestryman of St. Paul's Episcopal Church. When Ferdinand Foch, the Supreme Allied Commander during World War I, toured the United States in 1921, Hunton served on the committee organizing his November 23 visit to Richmond and was toastmaster at the dinner held in Foch's honor at the Jefferson Hotel.

== Later life and death ==
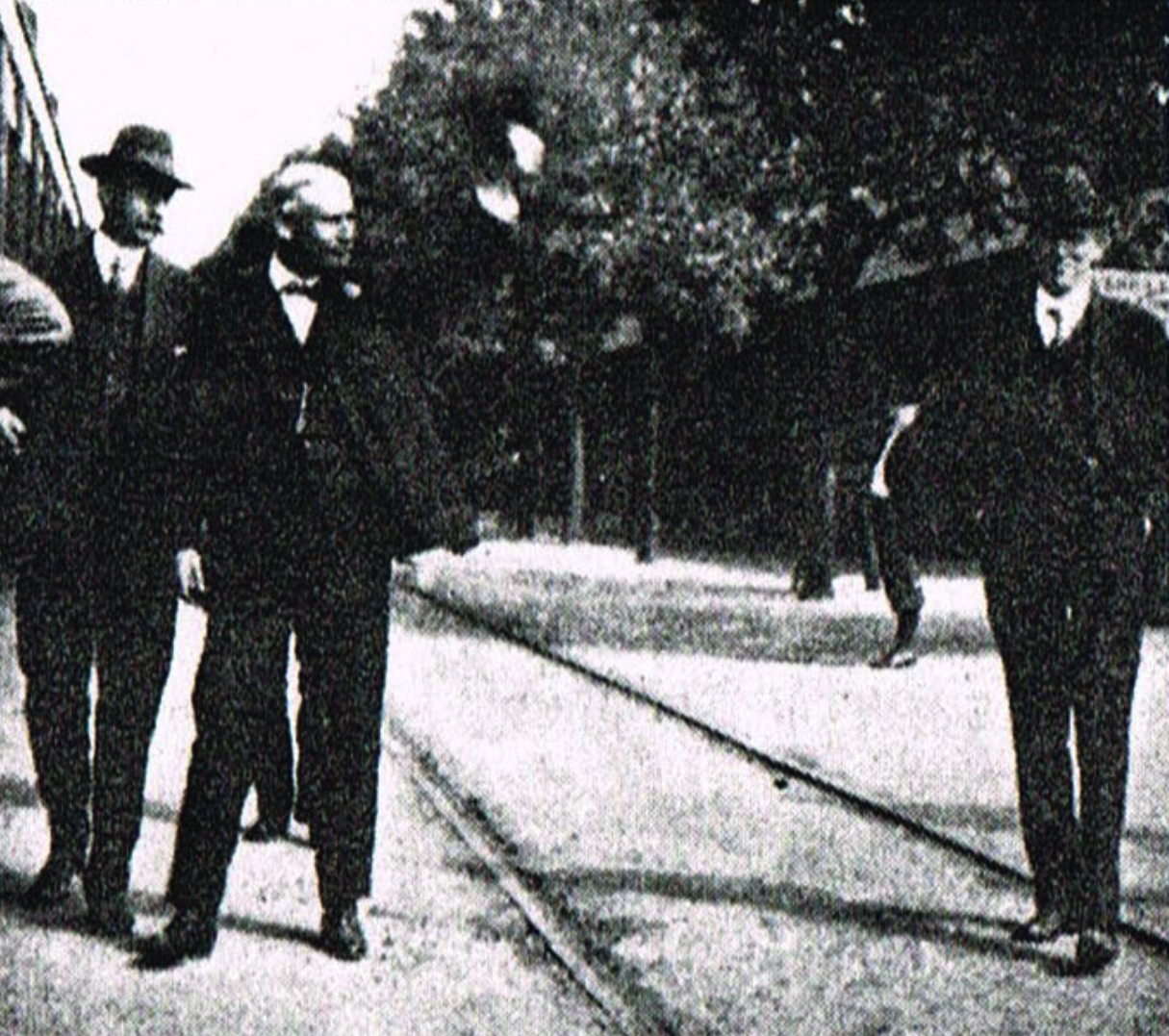
Hunton during his tenure as president of the Richmond, Fredericksburg and Potomac Railroad, saluting the station force at Ashland

On September 16, 1920, Hunton was elected president of the Richmond, Fredericksburg and Potomac Railroad by its board of directors, and he retired from Munford, Hunton, Williams & Anderson the same day. Taking up an office in Richmond's Broad Street Station, he succeeded the late William H. White, under whom he had served as the railroad's general counsel since 1914. Chief among Hunton's accomplishments as president was the establishment of a Voluntary Relief Department that allowed railroad employees to save a portion of their salary to go towards supporting their family after their death.

Hunton died on March 5, 1932, at his residence, 810 West Franklin Street, in Richmond. He had suffered from a heart affliction for over a year but was only seriously ill for a few days. Following services at St. Paul's Church, he was buried in Hollywood Cemetery alongside his parents, his first wife, and his daughter. His estate was valued at $880,000 (equivalent to $20,765,854 in 2025). In his will, he left over $500,000 to his widow, $250,000 to his son, $10,000 to MCV, and $5,000 to St. Paul's Church; he also established a $50,000 trust fund to be used to aid Richmond's neediest residents.

In 1939, MCV announced that its new dormitory at 12th and Marshall Streets, which had opened the previous year, would be named Hunton Hall in recognition of Hunton's years of service and financial contributions to the school. The building was demolished in 1977. In 1989, Virginia Commonwealth University named the First Baptist Church building Hunton Hall (now the Hunton Student Center) for Hunton and his son, who succeeded him on the MCV board of visitors.

Hunton's Noland and Baskervill-designed former residence, Hunton House, is a contributing property to the West Franklin Street Historic District. It was converted in 1946 to house medical offices and a laboratory. After a number of years, it was purchased by the newly established Virginia Commonwealth University, which has used it since as office space for its Department of Psychology as well as the Clark-Hill Institute for Positive Youth Development.

In 1999, he was named by Style Weekly as one of the 100 most influential Richmonders of the previous century.

Virginia House of Delegates
| Preceded by J. S. Mason | Member of the Virginia House of Delegates for Loudoun and Fauquier; 1893–1895 | Succeeded by D. C. Hatcher |
Non-profit organization positions
| Preceded by Legh R. Watts | President of the Virginia State Bar Association; 1915–1916 | Succeeded by John B. Jenkins |
| Preceded by George L. Christian | President of the Confederate Memorial Association; 1924–1932 | Succeeded by John Stewart Bryan |
Business positions
| Preceded by William White | President of the Richmond, Fredericksburg and Potomac Railroad; 1920–1932 | Succeeded by Norman Call |
Academic offices
| Preceded by George L. Christian | Chair of the Board of Visitors of the Medical College of Virginia; 1925–1932 | Succeeded by William T. Reed |
