= 1921 Virginia gubernatorial election =

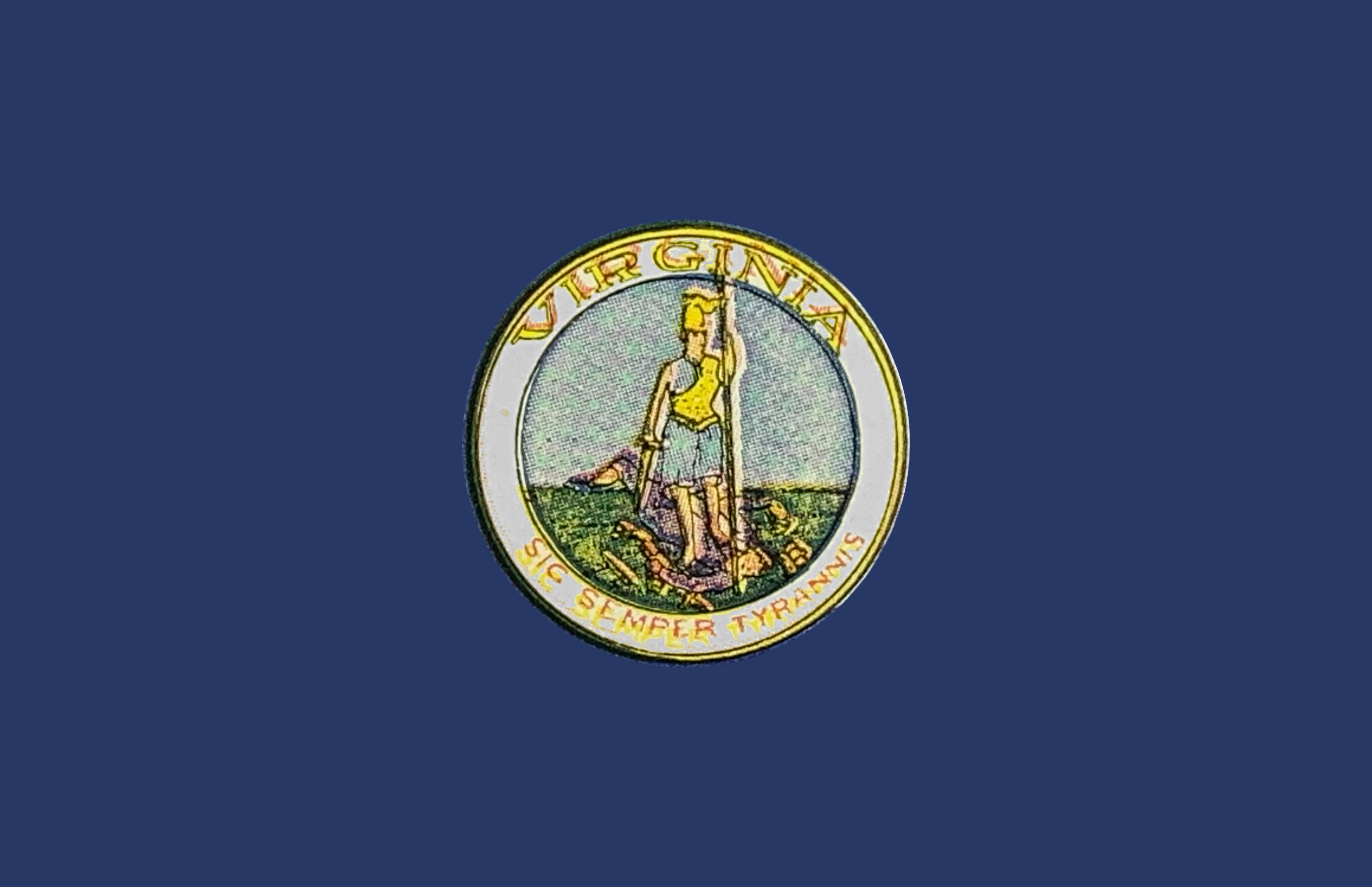
- November 8, 1921
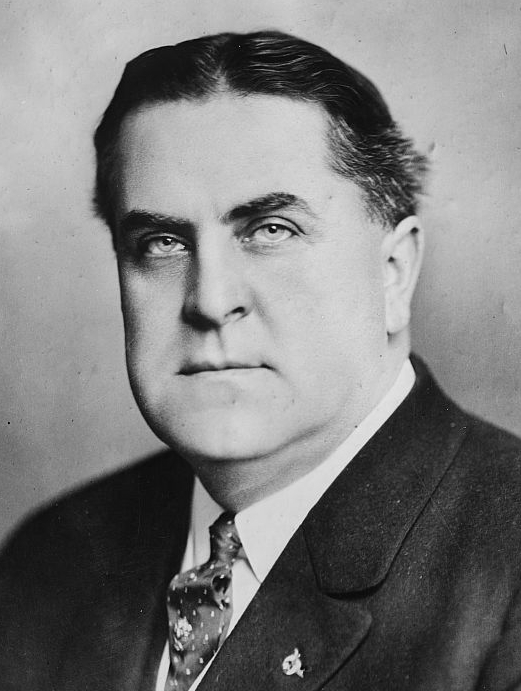

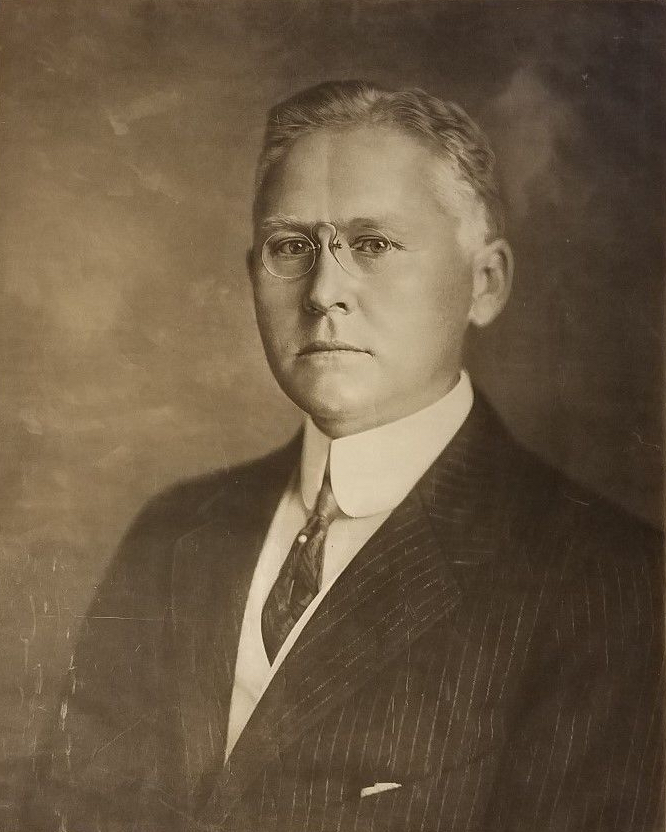
Nominee	E. Lee Trinkle	Henry W. Anderson
Party	Democratic	Republican
Popular vote	139,416	65,833
Percentage	66.15%	31.24%
- County and independent city results Trinkle: 50–60% 60–70% 70–80% 80–90% >90% Anderson: 50–60% 60–70%
Governor before election
Westmoreland Davis
Democratic
Elected Governor
E. Lee Trinkle
Democratic

The 1921 Virginia gubernatorial election was held on November 8, 1921, to elect the governor of Virginia.

== Results ==
Virginia gubernatorial election, 1921
Party	Candidate	Votes	%
Democratic	Elbert Lee Trinkle	139,416	66.15%
Republican	Henry W. Anderson	65,833	31.24%
Black-and-tan Republican	John Mitchell, Jr.	5,036	2.39%
Independent	John P. Goodman	251	0.12%
Independent	Mrs. George Custis	227	0.11%
Total votes		210,763	100.00%
Democratic hold			
