= Robert A. Wilson (Virginia politician) =

American business and civic leader

- Born: Robert Archer Wilson Jr. June 9, 1913; Norfolk, Virginia, U.S.
- Died: March 31, 2003 (aged 89); Tucson, Arizona, U.S.
- Education: University of Virginia (BS); University of Arizona (MEd, PhD)
- Spouse: Floy Leigh Lawton (m. 1941; died 1998)
- Children: 2

Robert Archer Wilson Jr. (June 9, 1913 – March 31, 2003) was an American business and civic leader from Richmond, Virginia. He was a name partner of the advertising agency Cargill, Wilson & Acree and served as its president and as chair of its executive committee. He was a member of the Richmond Charter Commission, which drafted the city's City Manager Charter in 1948. He was elected to City Council and later vice-mayor. He was president of the Richmond Jaycees and served on the boards of visitors of the Richmond Professional Institute and Virginia Commonwealth University (VCU), including periods as rector of both. In 1983, at its spring commencement, VCU presented him with its Edward A. Wayne Medal, recognizing outstanding contributions or exemplary service to the university.

Political offices
Preceded by John S. Davenport III	Vice Mayor of Richmond, Virginia; 1950–1952	Succeeded by Thomas P. Bryan
Academic offices
Preceded by Eppa Hunton IV	Rector of the Board of Visitors of Virginia Commonwealth University; 1970–1972	Succeeded by Wyndham B. Blanton Jr.
