= Thomas Byrne (Virginia politician) =

American politician in Virginia

Thomas Byrne was an American politician who served in the Virginia House of Delegates between 1817–1818, representing Monongalia County (now part of West Virginia). A physician, he married Rebecca Dorsey of Morgantown. He moved to Missouri in 1820, where he died.

Byrne is not to be confused with another Thomas Byrne who served in the Virginia House of Delegates between 1889-1894, from the Richmond area.
