= Conway R. Sands =

American politician

Member of the Virginia Senate from the 35th district
- In office December 4, 1889 – December 4, 1901 Serving with William Lovenstein
- Preceded by: J. Taylor Ellyson
- Succeeded by: Julian Bryant

Personal details
- Born: Conway Robinson Sands; May 5, 1860 Richmond, Virginia, U.S.
- Died: April 11, 1920 (aged 59) Richmond, Virginia, U.S.
- Party: Democratic
- Spouse: Mary Stuart Bowcock

Conway Robinson Sands (May 5, 1860 – April 11, 1920) was a Virginia lawyer and state senator aligned with the Democratic Pary and Staples organization who represented Richmond, Virginia, and surrounding areas in Henrico County (1889-1901).

== Early and family life ==
Sands was born in Richmond, to the former Ella Virginia Goddin and her husband, (Rev.) Alexander Hamilton Sands (1828-1887). Although his paternal grandfather had farmed in York County, his father had been born in Williamsburg, where he had attended the grammar school of the College of William and Mary before moving to the state capital in 1843 to become the deputy clerk of the Superior Court. The elder Sands held the same office of the U.S. Circuit Court (1845-1845) and also begin publishing scholarly legal books. He joined the Confederate States Army during the American Civil War (during which he was a judge advocate), and also became a Baptist minister (with congregations in Ashland and Glen Allen north of Richmond). This man's uncle Johnson Sands (1807-1898) had moved to Richmond in 1858 and held an office in the Confederate Treasury department before moving to Washington, D.C. following the war. This boy was named after his father's friend, lawyer, historian and writer Conway Robinson. His mother gave birth 13 times, but many died as infants. His eldest surviving brother William Hamilton Sands (1857-1918) served many years as clerk of the Richmond chancery court; Tucker Kingsford Sands (1867-1939) would later move to Washington D.C., and Alexander Hamilton Sands Jr. (1875-1965) would join the family legal practice as well as become fascinated by Virginia history.

== Career ==
Admitted to the Virginia bar, Sands would serve as the commonwealth attorney (prosecutor) for Richmond, as well as become active in Democratic party politics, and practice law with his father and youngest brother. Before the American Civil War, the family firm had been known as Howard and Sands, then Sands and Carter. After the war, it became Sands & Sands and later Sands, Anderson, Marks and Miller, and continues today as Sands Anderson.

Richmond and surrounding Henrico County voters elected and re-elected Sands as one of their two representatives in the Virginia Senate (a part-time position) where he served alongside William Lovenstein until 1897, and then alongside B.B. Munford until reorganization prompted by the Virginia Constitutional Convention of 1901. During his legislative service, Sands chaired the joint library committee.

His brother, Alexander Hamilton Sands, served as Commonwealth's Attorney for Henrico County.

== Personal life ==
Sands married Mary Bowcock, and they had four children. Their sons, Charles B. Sands, was a lieutenant and was killed in action during World War I. Their son Sid Sands became a football coach and insurance company employee.

== Death and legacy ==
Sands died and was buried in Richmond in the family plot at Hollywood Cemetery.

Senate of Virginia
Preceded by J. Taylor Ellyson	Virginia Senator for the 35th District; 1889–1901	Succeeded by Julian Bryant
