= Jeffrey Holmstead =

American lobbyist and lawyer (born 1960)

Jeff Holmstead
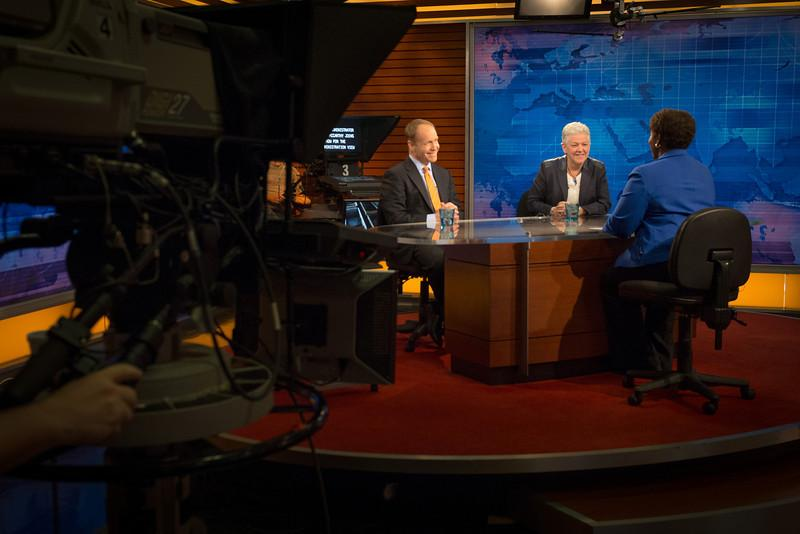
- Jeffrey Holmstead in 2014.
- Born: Jeffrey Ralph Holmstead; June 20, 1960 (age 65); Boulder, Colorado, U.S.
- Education: Brigham Young University (BA); Yale Law School (JD)
- Occupations: Lawyer, energy lobbyist
- Known for: Former deputy administrator of the Environmental Protection Agency in the George W. Bush administration
- Political party: Republican
- Spouse: Lisa (Elizabeth T. Holmstead)
- Children: 4 (2 sons, 2 daughters)
- Parent(s): Rex Kay Holmstead (father) and Melly (Mary Louise Gillison) Holmstead (mother) - married in the Salt Lake Temple in 1959

Jeffrey Ralph "Jeff" Holmstead (born June 20, 1960) is an American energy lobbyist and lawyer. He is a partner with Houston-based Bracewell LLP and a former deputy administrator of the Environmental Protection Agency in the George W. Bush administration. Bracewell LLP is formerly Bracewell & Giuliani, the international law firm of Rudy Giuliani.

== Career ==
While he was an undergraduate at Brigham Young University, Jeff Holmstead sang bass in the choir. He earned degrees in economics and English and decided to study law at Yale. He began his legal career in 1987 after graduation from Yale Law School.

He was appointed and served as assistant administrator of the Environmental Protection Agency in the George W. Bush administration.

He joined Houston-based Bracewell LLP as a lawyer and energy lobbyist and became partner in the firm.

Upon reports that Holmstead might have been appointed to a high-level position in the Environmental Protection Agency or the First Trump cabinet, The Washington Post'' reported that Holmstead had filed a new, revised lobbying disclosure indicating he had dropped all of his longtime lobbying clients, including Duke Energy, DTE Energy, and Ameren, which he had represented since 2007 in his role with Bracewell.

== Personal life ==
Jeff Holmstead is one of the five children born to Ralph Kay Holmstead and Melly (Mary Louise Gillison) Holmstead, who were married in the Salt Lake Temple in 1959. Three years later, in 1962, they moved to Boulder, Colorado, where they spent 51 years until his death in 2014, and the entire family practiced their Mormon faith, as his family and children continue to do today. He and his father served first as missionaries, then as congregants and bishops in the Church of Jesus Christ of Latter-day Saints. His father had been a missionary in Tegucigalpa, Honduras and Quetzaltenango, Guatemala, where he learned to speak Spanish fluently. His father graduated from BYU at the top of his class, after working his way through college managing a farm, shearing sheep, and finishing cement. He was a businessman, real estate broker, and investor in Boulder, Colorado.

Jeff Holmstead is a lifelong Mormon and remains active and serves as a bishop in his church. He speaks fluent Spanish. He also is a long-time soccer fan. He and his wife, Lisa (Elizabeth T. Holmstead), are both from Colorado and together have four grown children. Since 2013, they had lived in Gaithersburg, Maryland. Before 2013, they had lived in Washington, D.C. for two years. They enjoy hiking and the outdoors with their family.

== Education ==
- Fairview High School, Boulder, Colorado, 1978
- Brigham Young University, Provo, Utah, BA, economics and English, summa cum laude, 1984
- Yale Law School, New Haven, Connecticut, JD, 1987

== External sources ==
- Reilly, A. Early skimishes on Trump policies prefigure long legal war. Greenwire, in E&E News. Thursday, April 27, 2017
- Bureau of National Affairs ( (Arlington, Virginia)), 2004. Environment Reporter - Volume 35, Issues 26-50 - Pages 1571, 2093, 2333, etc.
- Collins, C. Toxic Loopholes: Failures and Future Prospects for Environmental Law. Cambridge University Press. 2010. ISBN 9781139488952
- CQ Researcher. Issues for Debate in American Public Policy: Selections from CQ Researcher. CQ Press, Mar 20, 2017. ISBN 9781506368788
- Devine, R.S. Bush Versus the Environment - Page 138. Knopf Doubleday Publishing Group, Dec 18, 2007. ISBN 9780307425126
- Faber, D. Capitalizing on Environmental Injustice: The Polluter-Industrial Complex in the Age of Globalization. Rowman & Littlefield Publishers, Jul 17, 2008. ISBN 9780742563445
- Funk, W.F., Lubbers, J.S., Pou, C. Federal Administrative Procedure Sourcebook - Page 824. American Bar Association, 2008. ISBN 9781590319697
- Goodell, J. Big Coal: The Dirty Secret Behind America's Energy Future - Page 144. Houghton Mifflin Harcourt, Apr 3, 2007. ISBN 9780547526621
- Hartmann, T. Unequal Protection - Page 305. ReadHowYouWant.com, Apr 1, 2011. ISBN 9781459618053
- Hightower, J. Let's Stop Beating Around the Bush: More Political Subversion from Jim Hightower. Penguin, Jul 15, 2004. ISBN 9781101215449
- Isser, S. Electricity Restructuring in the United States. Cambridge University Press, Apr 16, 2015. Page 64. ISBN 9781107100787
- Layzer, J.A. Open for Business: Conservatives' Opposition to Environmental Regulation. p. 288 in Chapter 7, MIT Press, Nov 2, 2012. ISBN 9780262304375
- Levin, M.A., DiSalvo, D., Shapiro, M.M. Building Coalitions, Making Policy: The Politics of the Clinton, Bush, and Obama Presidencies. Johns Hopkins University Press. 2012. ISBN 9781421405094. Jeffrey Holmstead was interviewed by an author, February 24, 2009.
- McGarity, T.O. Freedom to Harm: The Lasting Legacy of the Laissez Faire Revival. Yale University Press, Mar 19, 2013. ISBN 9780300195217
- Potter, W., Penniman, N. Nation on the Take: How Big Money Corrupts Our Democracy and What We Can Do ... Bloomsbury Publishing USA, Mar 1, 2016. ISBN 9781632861108
- Revesz, R., Lienke, J. Struggling for Air: Power Plants and the "War on Coal" - Page 76. Oxford University Press, Jan 11, 2016. ISBN 9780190233112
- Ricci, G.R. Values and Technology: Religion and Public Life. Transaction Publishers, Dec 31, 2011. Page 132. ISBN 9781412844598
- Safe, Accountable, Flexible, and Efficient transportation Equity Act of 2005. DIANE Publishing. ISBN 9781428960053
- Shulman, S. Meet Jeff Holmstead. Section of Clear Skies? Healthy Forests? pp. 69-76 In Science: Suppression and Distortion in the Bush Administration. University of California Press, 2008
- Steinzor, R., Shapiro. S. The People's Agents and the Battle to Protect the American Public: Special Interests, Government, and Threats to Health, Safety, and the Environment. ISBN 9780226772042
- United States. Congress. Senate. United States Congressional Serial Set, Serial No. 14873, Senate Reports Nos. 221-259 Government Printing Office
