= Mary-Cooke Branch Munford =

American activist (1865–1938)

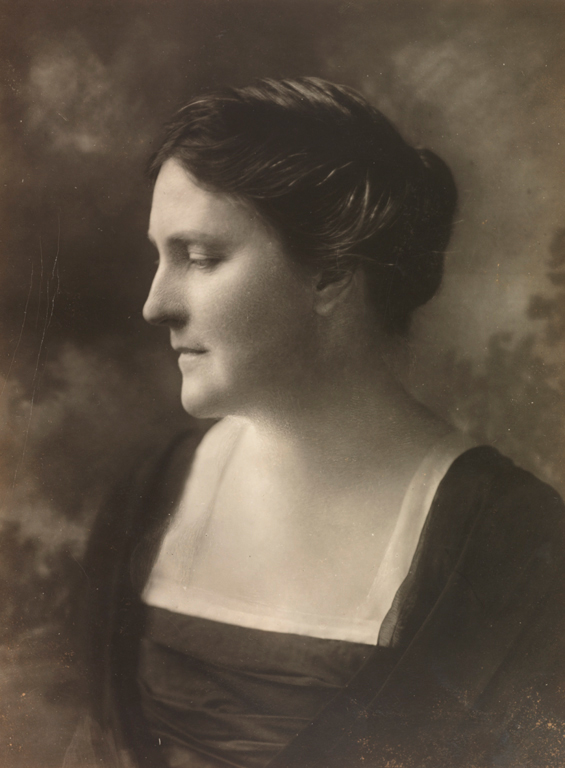
- Photographic print of Mary-Cooke Branch Munford
- Born: Mary-Cooke Branch; September 15, 1865; Richmond, Virginia, U.S.
- Died: July 3, 1938 (aged 72)
- Burial place: Hollywood Cemetery; 37°31′56″N 77°27′34.8″W
- Spouse: Beverley B. Munford (m. 1893; died 1910)

Mary-Cooke Branch Munford (September 15, 1865 – July 3, 1938) was an activist for women's rights, civil rights, women's suffrage, and education in Virginia.

== Life ==
Mary-Cooke Branch was a native of Richmond, Virginia; she was the youngest daughter of James Read Branch and Martha Louise Patteson Branch. Her family, of English extraction, was prominent in local affairs; her grandfather, Thomas Branch, had served in the Confederate Congress, and nephews included the writer James Branch Cabell and the Episcopal preacher Walter Russell Bowie.

Her father drowned accidentally three years after her birth in a bridge collapse on the way to a Republican rally. She grew up in a rich family, but from a young age she became interested in social welfare issues, a passion which was only intensified after her marriage, on November 22, 1893, to Beverley Bland Munford, a lawyer who also was active in social issues. With him she would go on to have two children, Mary Safford in 1895 and Beverley Bland in 1899. In the 1890s she also founded a Saturday Afternoon Club, whose weekly meetings attracted women from the upper echelons of Richmond society. Once she saw that their interest was in discussing refined topics rather than problems of civic life she pulled back her involvement.

=== Educational reform ===
Education reform was an area of especial interest to Munford, and one to which she devoted much focus over her life along with colleagues such as Orie Latham Hatcher. She held various positions of leadership in the Cooperative Education Association of Virginia, founded in 1903, and was one of five women involved in the foundation of the Richmond Education Association, which began life in 1901. She promoted public education, which at the time received scant attention and funding across most of Virginia. The Richmond group was an offshoot of a national organization, and focused mainly on rural parts of the state. At its yearly conferences, members would often tour African-American educational institutions in the Southern United States, such as the Hampton Institute.

Munford had been educated in both Richmond and New York, but regretted the fact that she had not been permitted to attend college despite her deep desire. Consequently, she worked to improve access to higher education for women. She attempted, via the Co-ordinate College League, to found a coordinate college at the University of Virginia dedicated to the education of white women. Legislation was introduced in the Virginia General Assembly, but defeated through fierce opposition, mainly through alumni of the university, and fell two votes short in the Virginia General Assembly in 1916. A tablet at the school commemorates his efforts. Nevertheless, Munford went on to become a member of the university's Board of Visitors in 1926 – the third woman to serve in that role – and after her death a building on campus was christened in her memory. She saw greater success in convincing the College of William and Mary to open its doors to women in 1918, and in March 1920 she became the first woman to serve on that school's Board of Visitors. The same year she joined the Richmond School Board, becoming the first woman to sit on that body as well. Munford also worked to improve opportunities for teacher training in the Commonwealth. In 1931 she managed to persuade Richmond's school board to reverse its policy discriminating against married women serving as teachers in the city's schools.

=== Suffrage and civil rights ===
Besides educational organizations, Munford was a member of many other clubs and civic groups during her career. These included the Woman's Committee of the Council of National Defense, the Equal Suffrage League of Virginia, the National Municipal League, the National Consumer's League, the National Child Labor Committee, the Young Women's Christian Association, the Woman's Club of Richmond, and the Virginia Agricultural Council of Safety. With the ratification of the Nineteenth Amendment to the United States Constitution, she began to serve on the board of the Virginia League of Women Voters, and on the local branch in Richmond as well. She was appointed to the Democratic National Committee as well, in 1920. She organized the Virginia Inter-Urban League, served on the Board of Trustees of Fisk College, and was also active as a trustee for the National Urban League. During World War I she also assisted in national defense efforts.

Following her husband's death in 1910, Munford turned more of her attention to the rights of blacks. She became an advocate of interracial cooperation, taking a paternalistic attitude towards African-Americans in line with that adopted by many of her class in the South. Her father's death, during a rally supporting the right of blacks to vote, further informed her view; she felt that he had sacrificed himself to the cause, lending it an air of greater nobility. With Janie Porter Barrett, she assisted in organizing the Virginia Industrial School for Colored Girls in 1915, serving on its board of trustees. She never directly acknowledged segregation, but nevertheless worked to provide assistance to underfunded black communities and neighborhoods in Richmond.

== Death and legacy ==
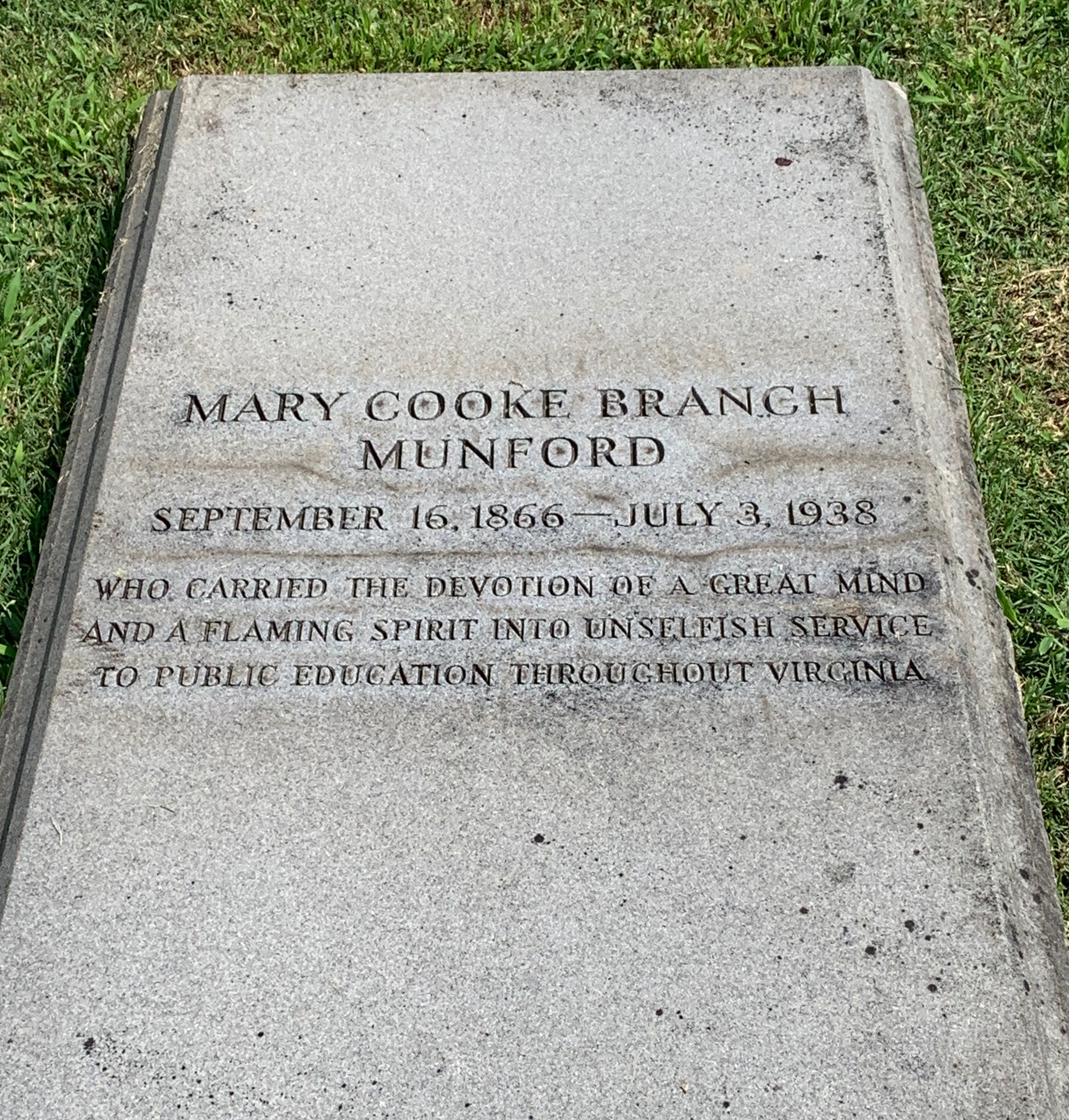
Munford's gravestone in Hollywood Cemetery, Richmond, Virginia, U.S.

Munford died in Richmond and was buried at Hollywood Cemetery, where her grave marker pays tribute to her legacy as an education reformer. Mary Munford Elementary School in the West End neighborhood of her hometown of Richmond, Virginia was named in her honor; a historical marker detailing her contributions to Virginia education currently stands in front of it. Munford Hall on the grounds of the University of Virginia was the school's first female dorm, and today houses a portion of the International Residential College; a former residence hall at William and Mary bears her name as well. Her papers are currently held by the Library of Virginia.
