= Sands Anderson =

American law firm

Sands Anderson PC
- Headquarters: Richmond, Virginia
- No. of offices: 6
- No. of attorneys: 80+
- Major practice areas: general practice; business and corporate transactions; commercial litigation; government; real estate; healthcare; cybersecurity and technology; risk management; trust and estates
- Date founded: 1842
- Founders: Alexander Hamilton Sands; A. Scott Anderson
- Company type: professional corporation
- Website: sandsanderson.com

Sands Anderson PC is a United States law firm in Richmond, Virginia. It was founded in 1842 and now has over 80 attorneys in six offices: Richmond, Christiansburg, Fredericksburg, Virginia Beach, and Williamsburg in Virginia; and Durham, North Carolina.

== History ==
The firm traces its beginnings to 1842, when Alexander Hamilton Sands, fourteen years old, moved to Richmond, Virginia, to work in the law office of his brother William G. Sands.
