= Walter Russell Bowie =

American priest & writer (1882–1969)

Walter Russell Bowie (October 8, 1882 – April 23, 1969), was a priest, author, editor, educator, hymn writer, and lecturer in the Episcopal Church.

== Early and Family Life ==
Walter Russell Bowie was born in Richmond, Virginia, actually the fourth of his family to have the same name, and with family relationships among the First Families of Virginia. Nonetheless, he traveled north for his college education, receiving a B.A. (1904) and M.A. (1905) from Harvard University. As a Harvard undergraduate Bowie was co-editor of The Harvard Crimson, with Franklin D. Roosevelt.

He then returned to Virginia and entered the Protestant Episcopal Theological Seminary, now known as Virginia Theological Seminary in Alexandria, Virginia, where he earned a B.D. in 1908 (shortly after which he was ordained a deacon) and later earned a D.D. (1919).

The Rev. Mr. Bowie married Jean Laverack on September 29, 1909. His aunt was the suffragist and educationist Mary-Cooke Branch Munford, and novelist James Branch Cabell was kin as well.

== Ministry ==
Bowie was ordained a priest in 1909. His initial service was at Emmanuel Episcopal Church in Albemarle County, Virginia. Rev. Bowie was then called to St. Paul's Church in Richmond, Virginia where he had been baptised. He served as its rector from 1911 until called by Grace Church in New York City in 1923, although that service was actually interrupted by World War I (during which Bowie served as a Red Cross chaplain at Base Hospital 45 in France). While in Richmond, Bowie was editor of the Southern Churchman.

Bowie became known as a preacher as well as author and hymnist. Particularly in the 1920s, he advocated for what later become known as the Social Gospel: supporting the League of Nations, advocating US immigration reform, and opposing the Ku Klux Klan and Fundamentalism. While in New York, particularly in the 1920s, Bowie joined the American Committee for Protection of Foreign Born, The Church League for Industrial Democracy, the Citizens’ Committee to Free Earl Browder, and the Civil Rights Congress.

Upon leaving Grace Church, Rev. Bowie remained in New York City as Professor of Pastoral Theology at Union Theological Seminary until 1950. He was a member of the editing team for Interpreter's Bible series and the Editorial Committee for Revised Standard Version of the Bible, which published the New Testament in 1946, Old Testament in 1952 and Apocrypha in 1957.

Bowie returned to his native Virginia in 1950, where he was a professor of Homiletics at his alma mater, Virginia Theological Seminary until retiring in 1956.

== Death and legacy ==
Bowie remained in Alexandria, where he outlived his wife by six years; both were buried at the Virginia Theological Seminary (which also remembers the former student and professor in the periodical room of its library). His papers are at the Franklin Delano Roosevelt library. His most popular hymns were "O Holy City, seen of John" (in the Hymnal 1982, #582, #583), "Lord Christ, When First thou Cam'st to earth" (in the Hymnal 1982, #598), and "God of Nations, who from dawn of days".

== Important works ==
- The Story of the Bible ISBN 0-687-39754-5
- The Story of the Church
- The Story of Jesus for Young People
- Christ be with me;: Daily meditations and personal prayers
- Lift Up Your Hearts
- Learning to Live
- "Lord Christ when first you came to Earth" (hymn written in 1928, now #598 in The Hymnal 1982)
- Interpreter's Bible: A Commentary in Twelve Volumes (editorial team with George Arthur Buttrick, John Knox, Samuel Terrien, Nolan B. Harmon)
- "O holy city seen of John" (now #582 in the Hymnal 1982)
- Revised Standard Version of the Bible (member of editorial committee)

== Ordained ministry ==
- Emmanuel Church, Greenwood VA, 1909–1911
- St. Paul's Episcopal Church (Richmond, Virginia) 1911–1923
- Grace Church, New York, NY, 1923–1939
- Union Theological Seminary in the City of New York, 1939–1950
- Virginia Theological Seminary, 1950–1955
