= Henry W. Anderson =

American attorney and politician (1870–1954)

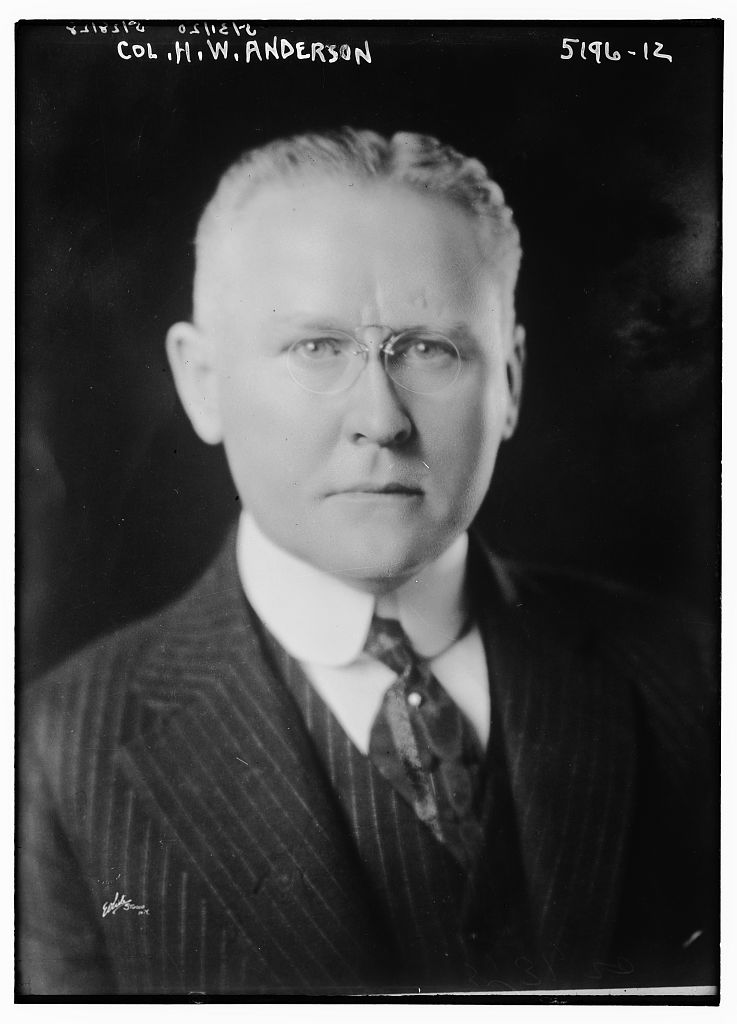
- Anderson, 1915

Member of the National Commission on Law Observance and Enforcement
- In office 29 May 1929 – 30 June 1931
- President: Herbert Hoover

Commissioner of Prohibition
- In office 1 July 1930 – 5 December 1933
- President: Herbert Hoover; Franklin D. Roosevelt
- Preceded by: James M. Doran
- Succeeded by: office abolished

Personal details
- Born: Henry Watkins Anderson; December 20, 1870 Dinwiddie, Virginia, U.S.
- Died: January 7, 1954 (aged 83) Richmond, Virginia, U.S.
- Resting place: Hollywood Cemetery
- Party: Republican
- Education: Washington & Lee University
- Occupation: Attorney

Henry Watkins Anderson (December 20, 1870 – January 7, 1954) was an American attorney and leader of the Republican Party in Virginia. He commanded the American Red Cross Commission to Romania during World War I and was the Republican candidate for governor of Virginia in 1921. He is perhaps best known as one of the founders of the law firm Hunton Williams and as the fiancé of the writer Ellen Glasgow.

== Early life ==
Anderson was born in Dinwiddie County, Virginia. He received an LL.B. in 1898 from Washington and Lee University and returned to Richmond. He was admitted to the bar and in 1899 formed a partnership with Beverley B. Munford. Two years later Anderson persuaded Munford, E. Randolph Williams, and Eppa Hunton Jr. to form a new firm, which evolved into Hunton & Williams, one of the largest and most prestigious law firms in the South.

In 1916, Anderson met and fell in love with the novelist Ellen Glasgow. They began to write a political novel together, for which Anderson supplied copies of his speeches. The character David Blackburn in Glasgow's novel The Builders (1919) strongly resembles Anderson.

== World War I ==
After the United States entered World War I, Anderson commanded the American Red Cross Commission to Romania. He remained at his post in Romania until March 1918, when Romania's surrender to Germany forced the Red Cross mission to flee the country. He led a dramatic escape by train across Russia, risking falling into the hands of the equally unfriendly Bolsheviks and Mensheviks. He returned to Richmond but after the Armistice went back to Europe as Red Cross commissioner for the entire Balkans.

While in the Balkans, Anderson became infatuated with Queen Marie of Romania, and the two began a daily exchange of letters and presents. The rumors surrounding the relationship between Anderson and the queen and his blatant exploitation of their friendship caused his engagement with Glasgow to disintegrate. Glasgow eventually reconciled with Anderson and remained close to him until her death in 1945. She used recognizable details of his life in depicting her faithless heroes in several novels, including Barren Ground (1925), The Romantic Comedians (1926), and Vein of Iron (1935).

== Political career ==
In 1920, Anderson received the unanimous endorsement of the Virginia Republican convention for the vice presidency and at the national convention placed fourth in the initial balloting, but Calvin Coolidge received the nomination. Anderson chaired the Republican state convention in 1921 and was nominated for governor of Virginia. He ran on a platform advocating abolition of the poll tax, improvement of highways, reform of the educational system, and greater fiscal responsibility on the part of state government. In the general election, Anderson won about 35 percent of the vote and lost to Elbert Lee Trinkle.

Coolidge chose Anderson in 1924 as the agent to settle the Mexican claims resulting from retaliatory raids against Pancho Villa in 1916.

Anderson was mentioned for the vice presidency in 1928 and again in 1931. Presidents Warren G. Harding and Herbert Hoover considered nominating him to the United States Supreme Court in 1924 and 1931 respectively, but neither made such a nomination because of the opposition of Virginia Republican leader C. Bascom Slemp and a lack of support from Virginia's Democratic U.S. senators. In 1929 Hoover appointed Anderson to the Wickersham Commission on issues relating to law enforcement, criminal activity, police brutality, and Prohibition.

== Legal career ==
During the Great Depression, Anderson was a pioneer in corporate reorganization, especially for railroads and transportation companies. He became counsel for the Seaboard Air Line Railway, the Saint Louis-San Francisco Railway, the Denver and Rio Grande Western, and the Baltimore and Ohio. Anderson took a major part in developing what became Chapter XV of the 1939 Bankruptcy Act.

Anderson was stricken with colon cancer late in the 1940s and was eventually confined to bed. He died at his home in Richmond on January 7, 1954. He was buried in Hollywood Cemetery in Richmond.

Party political offices
Preceded by T. J. Muncy	Republican nominee for Governor of Virginia; 1921	Succeeded by S. Harris Hoge
