= E. Randolph Williams =

American lawyer (1871–1952)

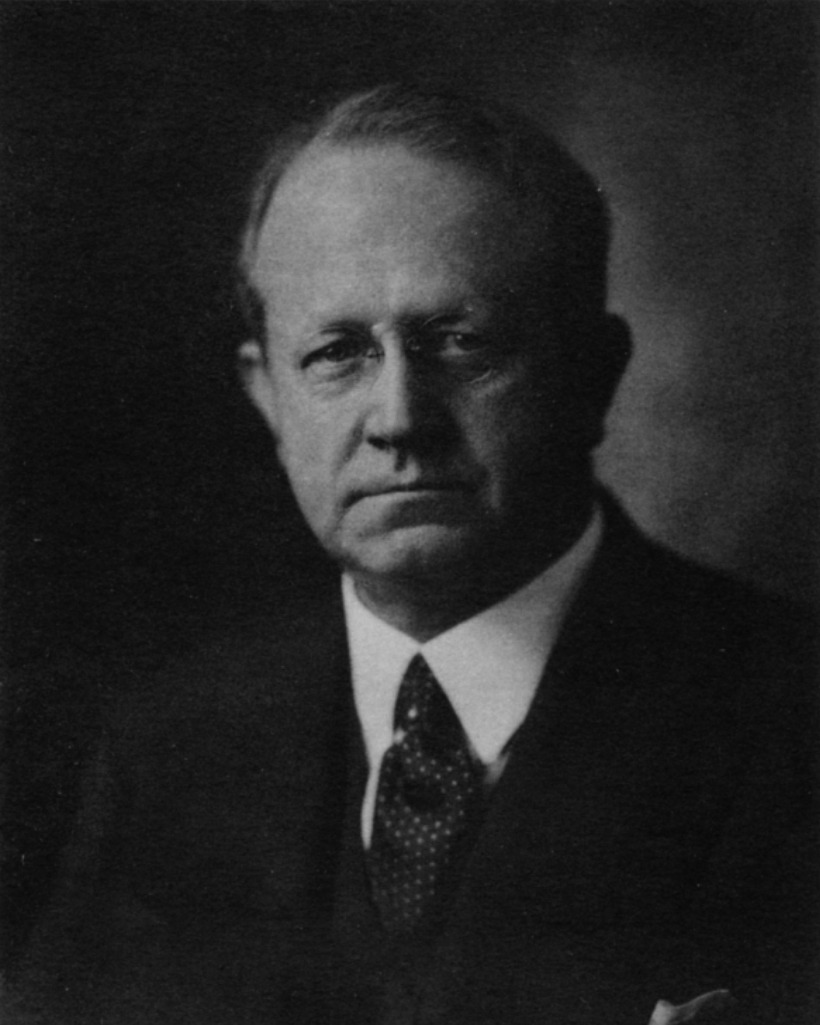
- Portrait of Williams, c. 1920s
- Born: Edmund Randolph Williams; May 1, 1871; Richmond, Virginia, U.S.
- Died: June 9, 1952 (aged 81); Richmond, Virginia, U.S.
- Burial place: Hollywood Cemetery; 37°32′07″N 77°27′23.4″W
- Education: University of Virginia (LLB)
- Occupation: Lawyer
- Political party: Democratic
- Spouse: Maude Stokes (m. 1900)
- Children: 4
- Relatives: John S. Williams (brother)

Edmund Randolph Williams (May 1, 1871 – June 9, 1952) was an American lawyer from Richmond, Virginia. In 1896, he began practicing law with William Wirt Henry. Shortly after Henry's death, in 1901, he co-founded the law firm Munford, Hunton, Williams & Anderson (now Hunton Andrews Kurth) with Beverley B. Munford, Eppa Hunton Jr., and Henry W. Anderson. He was the most senior member of the firm when he died in 1952. A member of the Virginia Historical Society from 1898, he was president of that organization from 1948 to 1952.

Williams died in Richmond on June 9, 1952, and, after services at St. Paul's Episcopal Church, was buried in Hollywood Cemetery.

Non-profit organization positions
Preceded by Alexander W. Weddell	President of the Virginia Historical Society; 1948–1952	Succeeded by Samuel M. Bemiss
