= Form book =

A form book is a tool used by attorneys in the United States to aid in the filing of pleadings, motions and other legal documents with a court or similar decision-making body. A form book may be a bound volume or binder containing loose-leaf pages, containing forms, clauses and model documents that the attorney might use when preparing a legal document or court pleading.

== Purpose ==
Due to the exacting nature of legal forms and the time and effort required to prepare legal documents, form books were created as an aid in the drafting process. These books conserve time and serve as a reference to attorneys and law students seeking to use them in their practice. The importance of these books is not to be underestimated, as a form lacking proper language or information may jeopardize court proceedings.

Forms can contain standard language to be used in court proceedings, or may more closely resemble a template which is to be filled in based on case specifics. Forms found in form books are often used as a reference, as the document that will be used must be tailored specifically to the court and situation in which it will be presented. In some cases, such as patent and bankruptcy, certain forms are legally required.

Form books may be arranged chronologically, alphabetically, by subject, or by jurisdiction. They may also include additional resources such as outlines, research references, annotations, state considerations, and law practice checklists in addition to the forms.

The style, format, and information required in court documents differs from one jurisdiction to another, between different levels of courts in a system, and between different areas of law. Therefore, the companies that publish casebooks and other legal materials often publish form books as well, offering selections specific to the location and type of practice in which their customers are engaged. Many publishers offer the forms in their books on computer discs. Some books may be accompanied by CD-ROMs or DVD-ROMs.

The advent of the Internet has lessened demand for printed form books. Many forms are now distributed freely by various courts, and others are available for free or online purchase. Forms online may be offered with drafting tools and other resources.

== Types ==
There are several different categories of form books available. These differ in their organization, subject, and the nature of the information contained.

=== General form books ===
General form books usually fall into one of two categories: transactional, or covering pleading and practice processes. Transactional (or legal) forms give examples of contracts, wills, leases, deeds, mortgages, and other substantive matters. Pleading and practice forms provide formatting and examples for legal language to be used in various court motions such as complaints, answers, and motions to dismiss. General form books are not state specific, and are annotated and cross-referenced. They are usually arranged alphabetically or encyclopedically and may provide a topical index to aid researchers in finding specific forms.

=== Form books for specific subjects or proceedings ===
Publishers can provide form books that discuss a specific type of practice. Topics which might have their own form books include real estate, business law, and tax.

=== Form books specific to geographic jurisdictions ===
Most states have form books containing state-specific forms. These can be published by various entities such as state courts or individual state bar association organizations. Other court systems may publish their own materials as well.

=== Other types ===
Another type of form book is designed for those seeking legal forms but not trained as lawyers, commonly referred to as a “self-help” form book. Topics included could be leases, wills, and contracts.

== Topics covered in form books ==
Typical forms included in a form book are a model complaint, answer, motion to compel discovery, motion for summary judgment, and request for permission to appeal. Other types of forms include: Transactional forms used to draft wills, contracts, and documents

- Procedural forms used to draft pleadings, motions, and complaints
- Real estate
- General legal topics like partnerships, contracts, and leases
- Bankruptcy
- Business forms
- Taxes and securities

== See also ==
- Law practice management
