= Thomas B. Gay =

American lawyer (1885–1983)

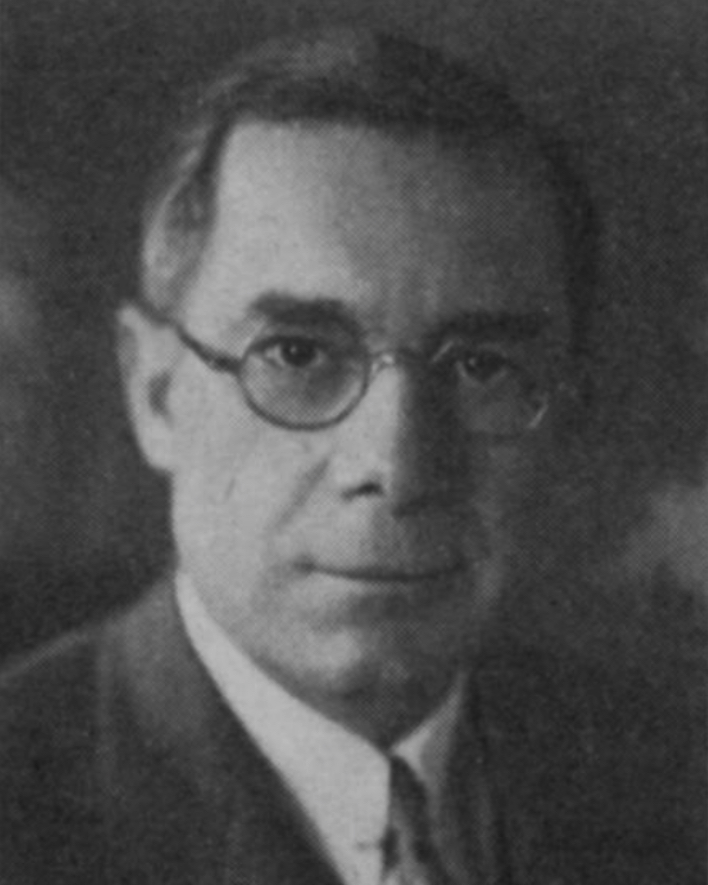
- Portrait of Gay, c. 1940
- Born: Thomas Benjamin Gay; May 22, 1885; Richmond, Virginia, U.S.
- Died: October 13, 1983 (aged 98); Richmond, Virginia, U.S.
- Burial place: Hollywood Cemetery; 37°32′06.8″N 77°27′24.5″W
- Education: University of Virginia
- Occupation: Lawyer
- Spouses: Lenore Temple Skene (m. 1916; died 1917); Mary Stuart Pattison (m. 1921; died 1968); Miriam Riggs Harkrader (m. 1977)
- Children: 2

Signature
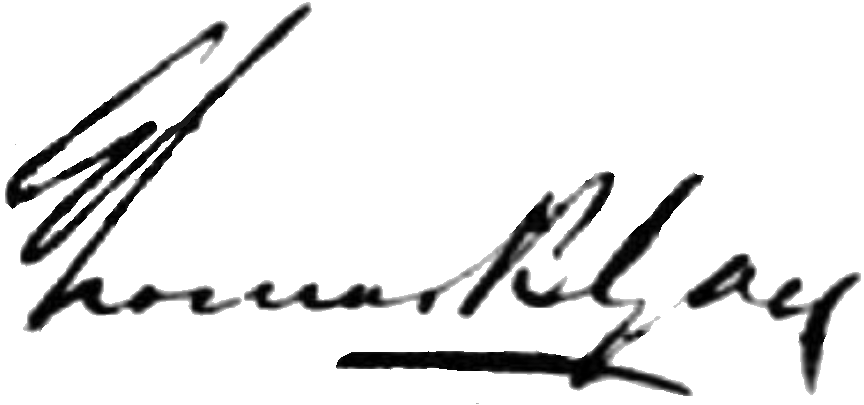

Thomas Benjamin Gay Sr. (May 22, 1885 – October 13, 1983) was an American lawyer from Richmond, Virginia. He joined the law firm Munford, Hunton, Williams & Anderson (now Hunton Andrews Kurth) in 1908, eventually becoming its first non-founding partner in 1916, and worked there until ill health forced his retirement in May 1983. He was the chair of the American Bar Association's House of Delegates from 1939 to 1941 and was president of the Virginia Bar Association from 1946 to 1947. A graduate of the University of Virginia School of Law, he served for a time on U.Va.'s board of visitors.

Gay died in Richmond on October 13, 1983, and, after services at St. Paul's Episcopal Church, was buried in Hollywood Cemetery.

Non-profit organization positions
Preceded by George Maurice Morris	Chair of the American Bar Association House of Delegates; 1939–1941	Succeeded by Guy R. Crump
Preceded by Howard C. Gilmer Jr.	President of the Virginia State Bar Association; 1946–1947	Succeeded by John L. Walker
Business positions
Preceded by None	Chair of the Executive Committee of Hunton, Williams, Gay, Moore & Powell; 1956–1960	Succeeded by Eppa Hunton IV
