= Beverley B. Munford =

American politician

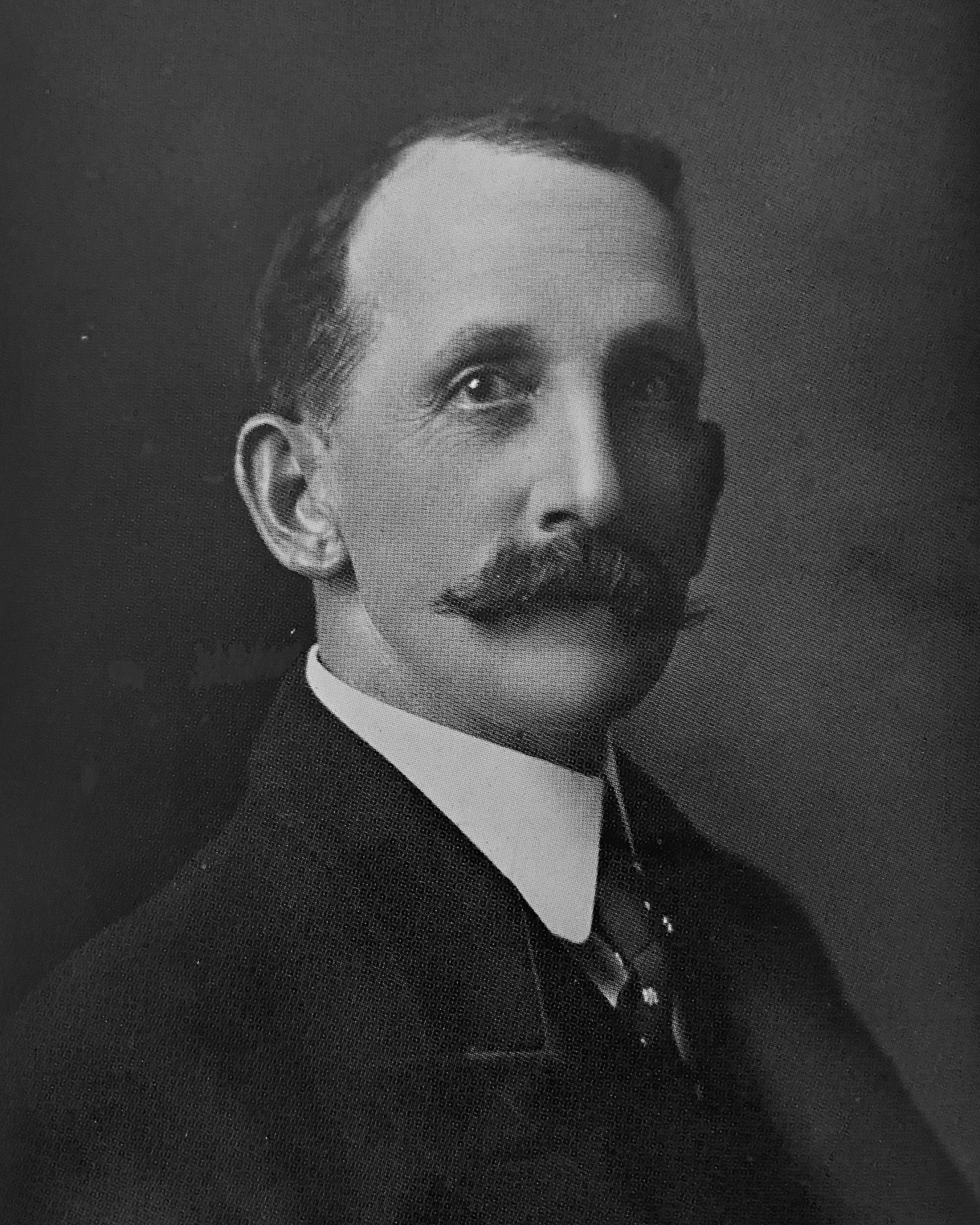
- Portrait of Munford, c. 1900–1910

Member of the Virginia Senate from the 35th district
- In office December 1, 1897 – December 4, 1901 Serving with Conway R. Sands
- Preceded by: William Lovenstein
- Succeeded by: George Wayne Anderson

Member of the Virginia House of Delegates from Richmond City
- In office December 2, 1891 – December 6, 1893 Serving with John Jackson, George B. Steel, & J. Taylor Stratton
- Preceded by: Thomas Byrne
- Succeeded by: Thomas Byrne

Member of the Virginia House of Delegates for Pittsylvania and Danville
- In office December 7, 1881 – December 8, 1887

Personal details
- Born: Beverley Bland Munford; September 10, 1856 Richmond, Virginia, U.S.
- Died: May 31, 1910 (aged 53) Richmond, Virginia, U.S.
- Resting place: Hollywood Cemetery; 37°31′56″N 77°27′34.8″W
- Party: Democratic
- Spouse: Mary-Cooke Branch (m. 1893)
- Education: College of William & Mary; University of Virginia

Beverley Bland Munford (September 10, 1856 – May 31, 1910) was an American lawyer, politician, social reformer, speaker, and author in Richmond, Virginia. He served eight years in the Virginia House of Delegates and four years in the Virginia Senate. He wrote a book about the causes of the American Civil War.

== Early life and family ==
=== Childhood and education ===
Beverley Bland Munford was the son of Colonel John Dunborrow Munford and the grandson of William Munford, author of "Munford's Reports" and a translator of Homer's Illiad. Beverley Bland Munford's childhood was spent on a farm near Williamsburg.

He entered the College of William and Mary in 1873 and graduated in 1877. At the age of nineteen he accepted a clerkship in the office of Judge J. D. Coles, going on to complete his study of law at the University of Virginia under John B. Minor. After being admitted to the bar, he began his practice by opening an office at Pittsylvania Courthouse.

=== Marriage ===
On November 22, 1893, Munford married activist and educational reformer Mary-Cooke Branch Munford. Their marriage was affectionate and congenial. They loved books and music and were described by their nephew Walter Russell Bowie as sharing liberal and forward-looking impulses. They had a daughter Mary Safford, born 1895 and a son, Beverly Bland Munford Jr., born 1899. His grandson, B. B. Munford III, was an executive at the Richmond investment firm Davenport & Co.

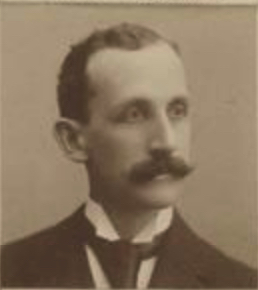
Delegate Munford in 1891

== Career ==
Beverley Munford was a member of the Richmond Education Association which Mary-Cooke Munford helped found. He served as a member of the board of visitors of the College of William and Mary and of the Hampton Normal School. Munford served on the board of directors of the Virginia Historical Society and was a vestryman at St. Paul's Episcopal Church.

He was a partner with Waller Redd Staples at the law firm Staples & Munford. At the time of his death he was a senior member with Munford, Hunton, Williams and Anderson.

After a long illness, Munford died at his home in Henrico County, Virginia. He was buried in Hollywood Cemetery.

Extant documents include a letter he wrote to John Allen Watts June 18, 1874 about his commencement speaking engagements and activities at Fincastle. James Branch Cabell's From the Hidden Way was dedicated to Munford.

== Bibliography ==
- Virginia's attitude toward slavery and secession by Beverley B. Munford, 50 editions published between 1909 and 2013.
- Random recollections by Beverley B. Munford (1905)
- Address of B.B. Munford before the Euzelian and Euepian Societies at Hollins Institute, June 16, 1886 by Beverley B Munford
- "Our times and the men for the times"; address of Beverley B. Munford before the Association of the Alumni of the College of William and Mary, on the occasion of the one hundred and ninety-fifth commencement exercises, July 4, 1889, by Beverley B Munford
