= Hunton Andrews Kurth =

American law firm

Hunton Andrews Kurth LLP
- Headquarters: Riverfront Plaza, East Tower; Richmond, Virginia, U.S.
- No. of offices: 19
- Offices: Richmond; Houston; Atlanta; Austin; Bangkok; Beijing; Boston; Brussels; Charlotte; Dallas; Dubai; London; Los Angeles; Miami; New York; San Francisco; Tokyo; Tysons; Washington, D.C.
- No. of attorneys: 900+
- Major practice areas: General practice
- Revenue: ▲$830 million (2021)
- Date founded: November 1, 1901 (as Munford, Hunton, Williams & Anderson, later Hunton & Williams); April 2, 2018 (merger with Andrews Kurth Kenyon and adoption of current name)
- Founders: Beverley B. Munford; Eppa Hunton Jr.; E. Randolph Williams; Henry W. Anderson
- Company type: Limited liability partnership
- Website: www.hunton.com

Hunton Andrews Kurth LLP, formerly known as Hunton & Williams LLP and commonly known as Hunton, is an American law firm. The firm adopted its current name on April 2, 2018, when it merged with Andrews Kurth Kenyon LLP.

Andrews Kurth Kenyon played a pivotal role in representing Texas railroad firms in the early 1900s, and brings a prominent reputation in the global energy industry to the combined firm. They represented both the Reconstruction Finance Corporation and Federal National Mortgage Corporation as part of FDR's New Deal. Famous clients include Howard Hughes. Andrews Kurth litigated his inheritance, IRS, and Spruce Goose cases. They also oversaw the public sale of Hughes shares in TWA.

The combined firm has offices in 19 cities, primarily in the United States.

== History ==
Hunton & Williams (formerly Munford, Hunton, Williams and Anderson) was founded on November 1, 1901, in Richmond, Virginia, by Henry W. Anderson, Eppa Hunton Jr., Beverley B. Munford, and E. Randolph Williams. The firm is focused on litigation, business, and finance law. The firm changed names many times over the years:

- Munford, Hunton, Williams and Anderson from 1901 to 1927
- Hunton, Williams, Anderson and Gay from 1927 to 1932 as Munford dropped out and Thomas B. Gay joined
- Hunton, Williams, Anderson, Gay and Moore from 1932 to 1954 as Thomas Justin Moore Sr. joined
- Hunton, Williams, Gay, Moore and Powell from 1954 to 1960 as Anderson dropped out and Lewis F. Powell Jr. joined
- Hunton, Williams, Gay, Powell and Gibson from 1960 to 1972 as Moore dropped out and George Dandridge Gibson joined
- Hunton, Williams, Gay and Gibson from 1972 to 1976 as Powell dropped out
- Hunton and Williams in from 1976 to 2003
- Hunton and Williams LLP from 2003 to 2018

The firm's most notable member, a name partner from 1954 until 1972, was Lewis F. Powell Jr., who focused on corporate law and representing clients such as the Tobacco Institute until he became a member of the U.S. Supreme Court in 1971.

The firm's initial hire of a woman was Elizabeth Tompkins, the first woman graduate of the University of Virginia Law School, who worked as a summer clerk at Hunton & Williams in 1921 and 1922. In 1943, during the Second World War, two women lawyers were hired to work at Hunton & Williams: Sarah Geer Dale and Nan Ross McConnell. Dale's first case involved a labor-law issue for Newport News Shipbuilding & Dry Dock. She left the firm in 1945 to get married and retired from the practice of law. McConnell stayed on until 1948, when she married.

Hunton & Williams was the first law firm in the United States to open an office solely for the practice of law pro bono. The firm has a Centre for Information Policy Leadership, which focuses on privacy and data protection work. The managing partner, Samuel A. Danon, has held that position since April 2023.

== Reputation ==
Hunton Andrews Kurth is an American "white shoe" law firm and according to the Am Law 100 is one of the highest-grossing law firms worldwide.

== Controversies ==
The firm, when operating as Hunton & Williams, employed William "Bill" Wehrum as a partner. Wehrum, who as a Hunton attorney represented oil and gas corporations, left his partner role when he was appointed to a top position in the Trump Administration Environmental Protection Agency (EPA). Wehrum's confirmation hearings resulted in controversy, when Wehrum was asked "Are you familiar with the increasing acidity of the ocean?" Wehrum said this was merely an 'allegation.' Wehrum's answers at the confirmation hearing attracted critical coverage. Wehrum was confirmed by a party-line vote and moved from Hunton to the EPA, where he has been described as "delivering for ex-clients." Wehrum's private meetings with oil and gas industry ex-clients, many from his time working at Hunton, have attracted criticism "despite federal ethics rules intended to limit such interactions."
