= List of burials at Hollywood Cemetery =

Hollywood Cemetery is a historic garden or rural cemetery established in 1847 in the Oregon Hill neighborhood of Richmond, Virginia. The 135-acre cemetery contains many notable burials including 2 U.S. Presidents, the President of the Confederate States of America and 25 Confederate Army officers.

== A ==
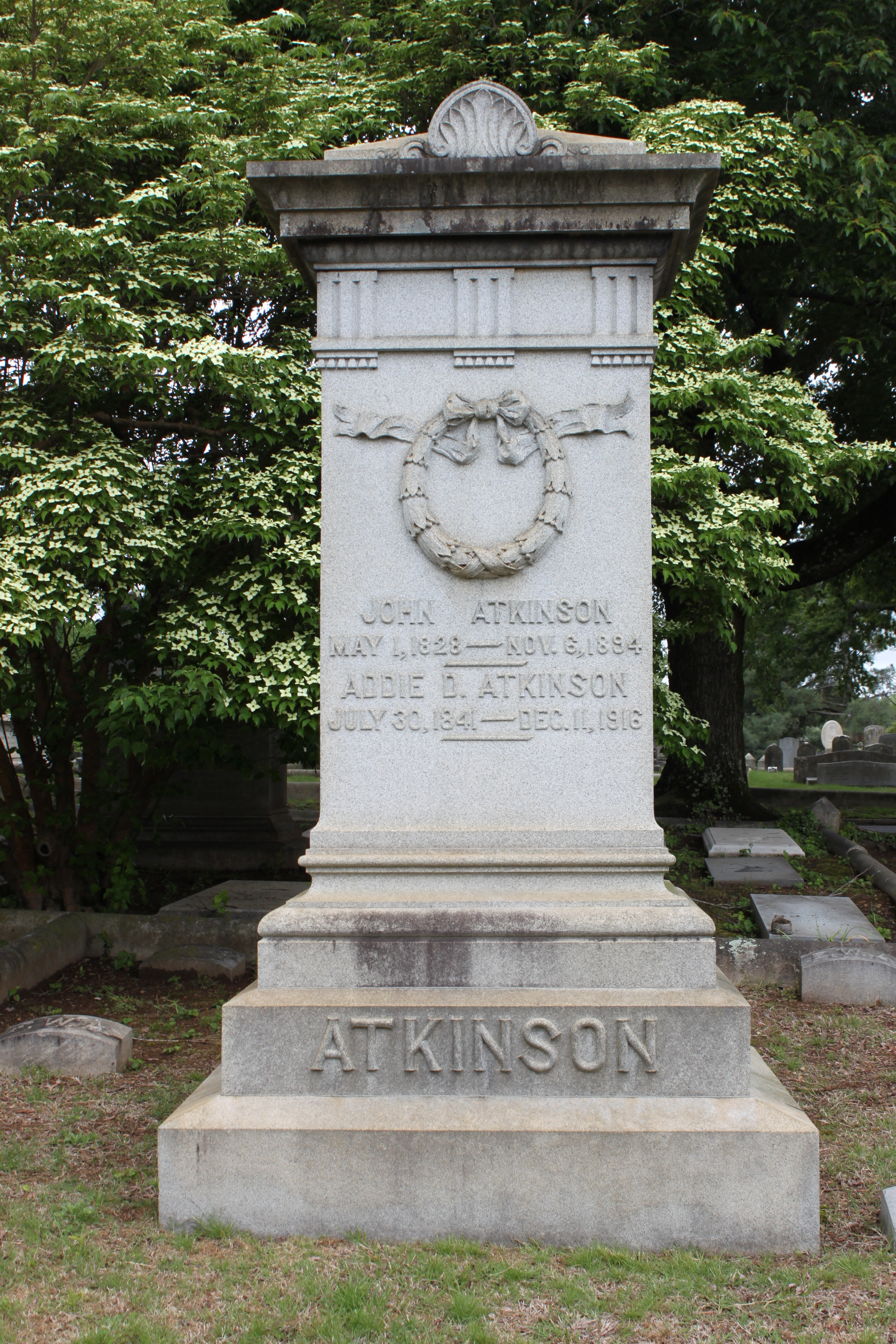
Adeline Atkinson

- Alden Aaroe (1918–1993), broadcast journalist
- Carl William Ackerman (1890–1970), journalist, author and educational administrator, the first dean of the Columbia School of Journalism
- George Ainslie (1868–1931), mayor of Richmond
- George E. Allen Jr. (1914–1990), lawyer
- A. Scott Anderson (1904–1971), mayor of Richmond
- George Wayne Anderson (1863–1922), Virginia state delegate and senator
- Henry W. Anderson (1870–1954), attorney and Republican party leader
- Joseph R. Anderson (1813–1892), civil engineer, industrialist, soldier
- T. Coleman Andrews (1899–1983), Commissioner of Internal Revenue, presidential candidate of the State's Rights Democratic Party in 1956
- T. Coleman Andrews Jr. (1925–1989), businessman and politician
- Edmund Archer (1904–1986), painter
- James J. Archer (1817–1864), Confederate General, American Civil War
- Grace Evelyn Arents (1848–1926), philanthropist, niece of Lewis Ginter
- Adeline Detroit Wood Atkinson (1841–1916), hotelier and proprietor of Hotel Richmond

== B ==
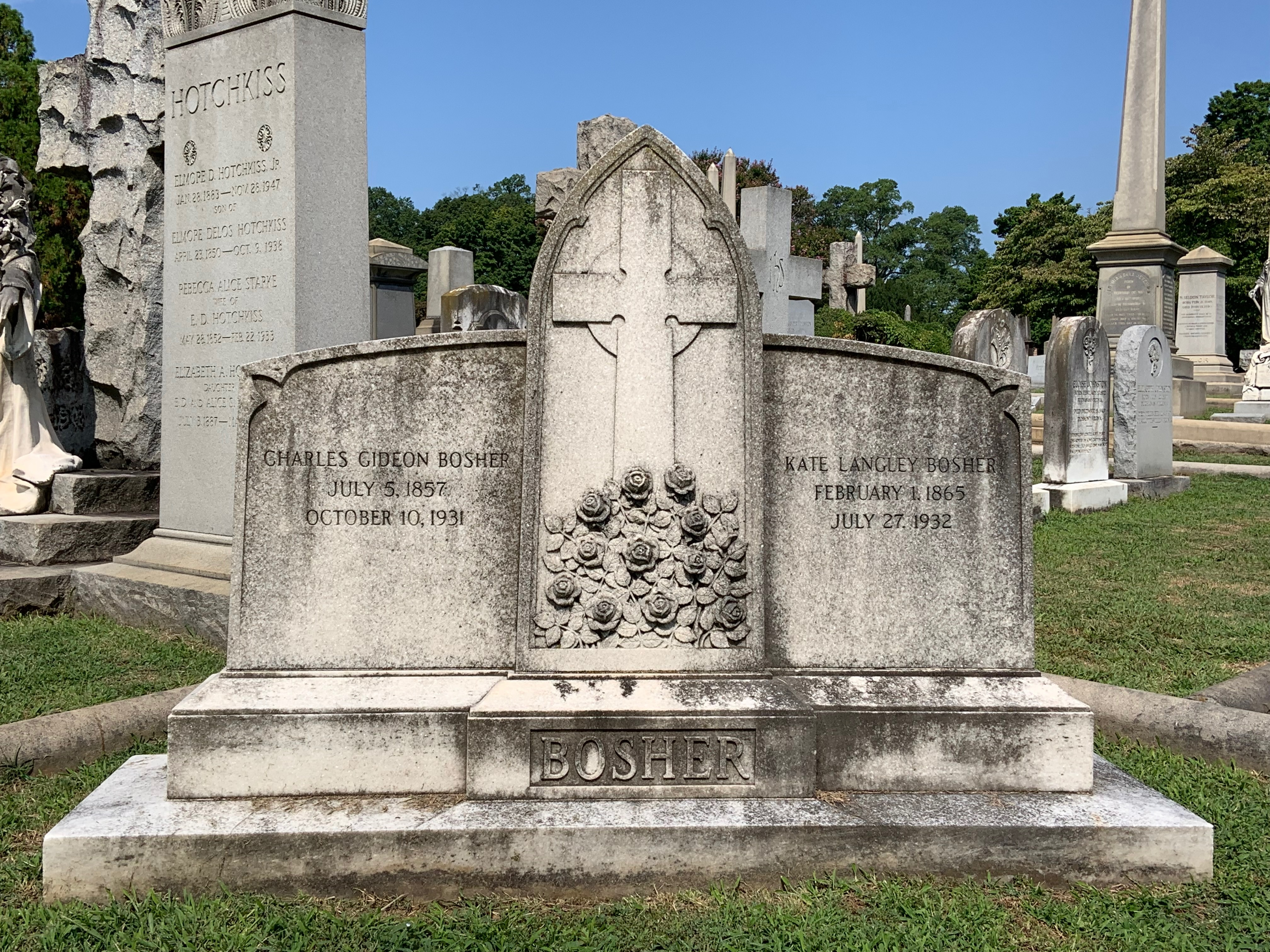
Kate Langley Bosher

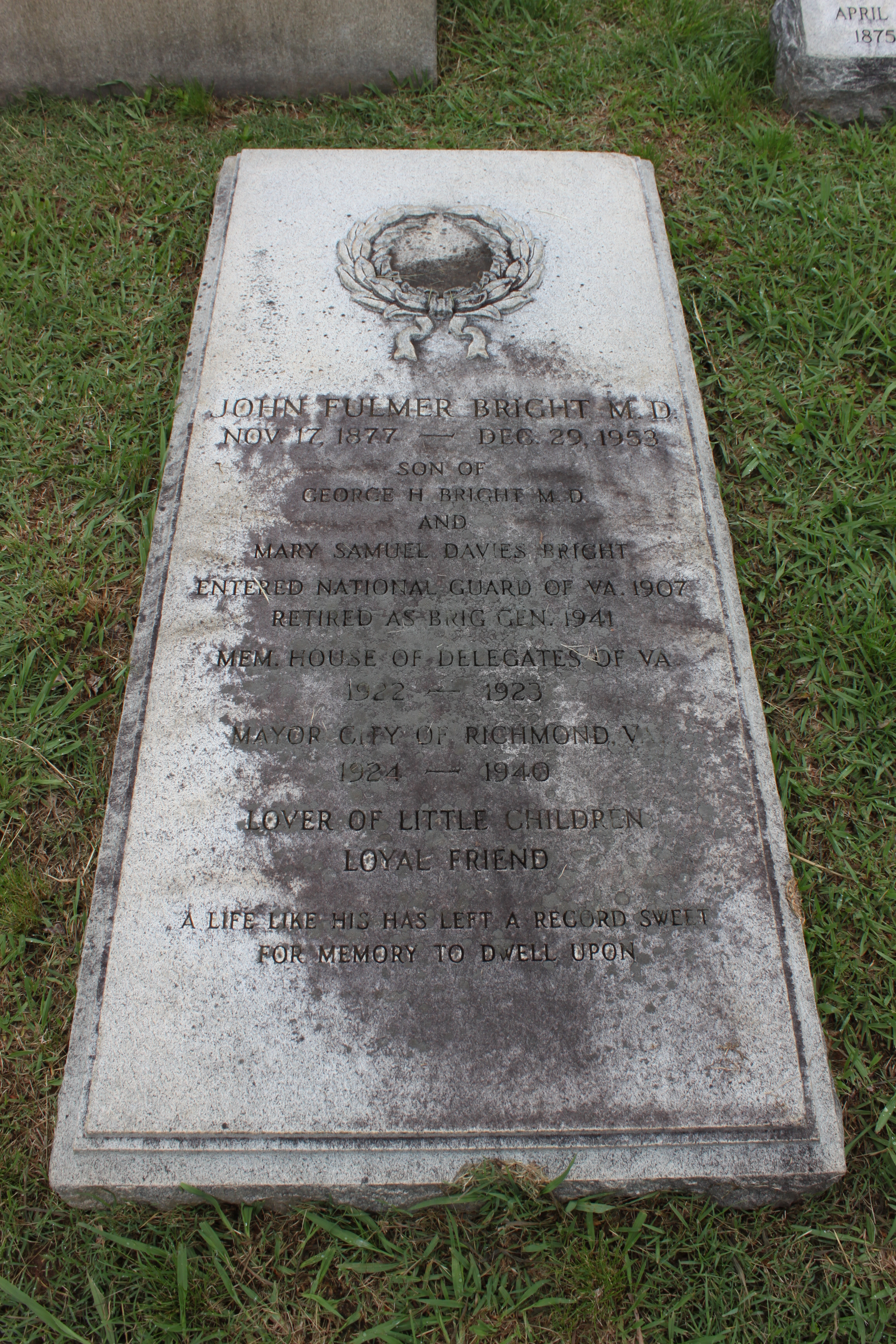
John Fulmer Bright

- Mary Baughman (1874–1956), physician and educator
- Lloyd James Beall (1808–1887), American military officer and paymaster of U.S. Army, Colonel Commandant of the Confederate States Marine Corps for the entire length of the War
- FitzGerald Bemiss (1922–2011), Virginia state senator and state delegate
- Turner Bethel (1895–1954), college football player
- Edyth Carter Beveridge (1862–1927), photojournalist
- Lloyd C. Bird (1894–1978), Virginia State Senator
- Robert P. Black (1927–2024), president of the Federal Reserve Bank of Richmond
- Lewis Harvie Blair (1834–1916), businessman and author
- Frederic W. Boatwright (1868–1951), President of the University of Richmond (1895–1946)
- Anna Whitehead Bodeker (1826–1904), suffragist
- Albert O. Boschen (1873–1957), state delegate
- Kate Langley Bosher (1865–1932), author, suffragette
- Allen Caperton Braxton (1862–1914), lawyer and member of the Virginia Constitutional Convention
- John Fulmer Bright (1877–1953), politician, physician, mayor of Richmond
- John M. Brockenbrough (1830–1892), Confederate Army colonel and brigade commander at Gettysburg
- Benjamin Thomas Brockman (1831–1864), merchant and Confederate officer
- Kathleen Bruce (1885–1950), historian
- Bland Cox Bruns (1901–1985), member of the Louisiana House of Representatives
- Virginia Keane Bryce (1861–1935), artist
- Algernon Sidney Buford (1826–1911), railroad executive and member of the Virginia House of Delegates
- David Judson Burr (1820–1876), state politician

== C ==
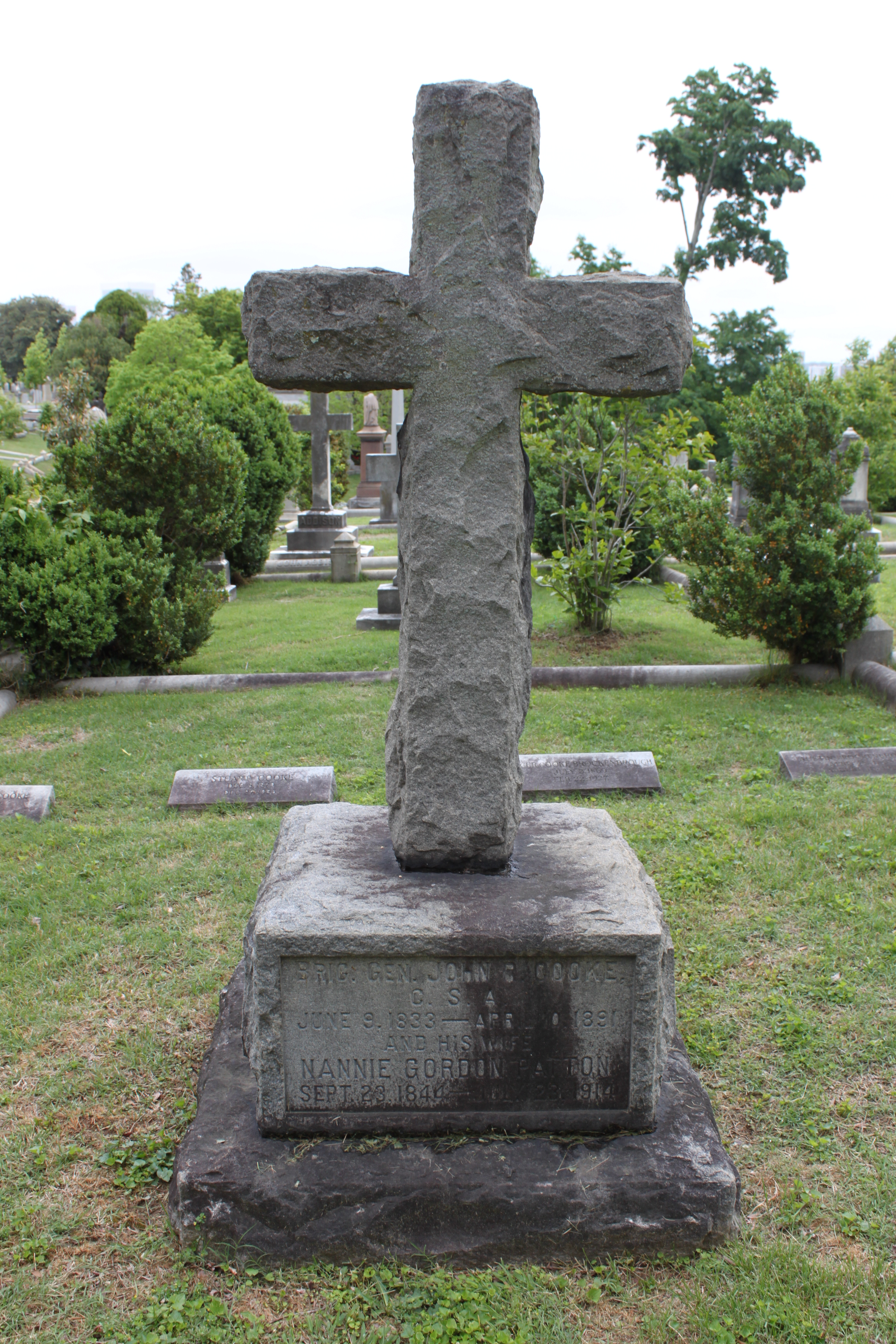
John Rogers Cooke

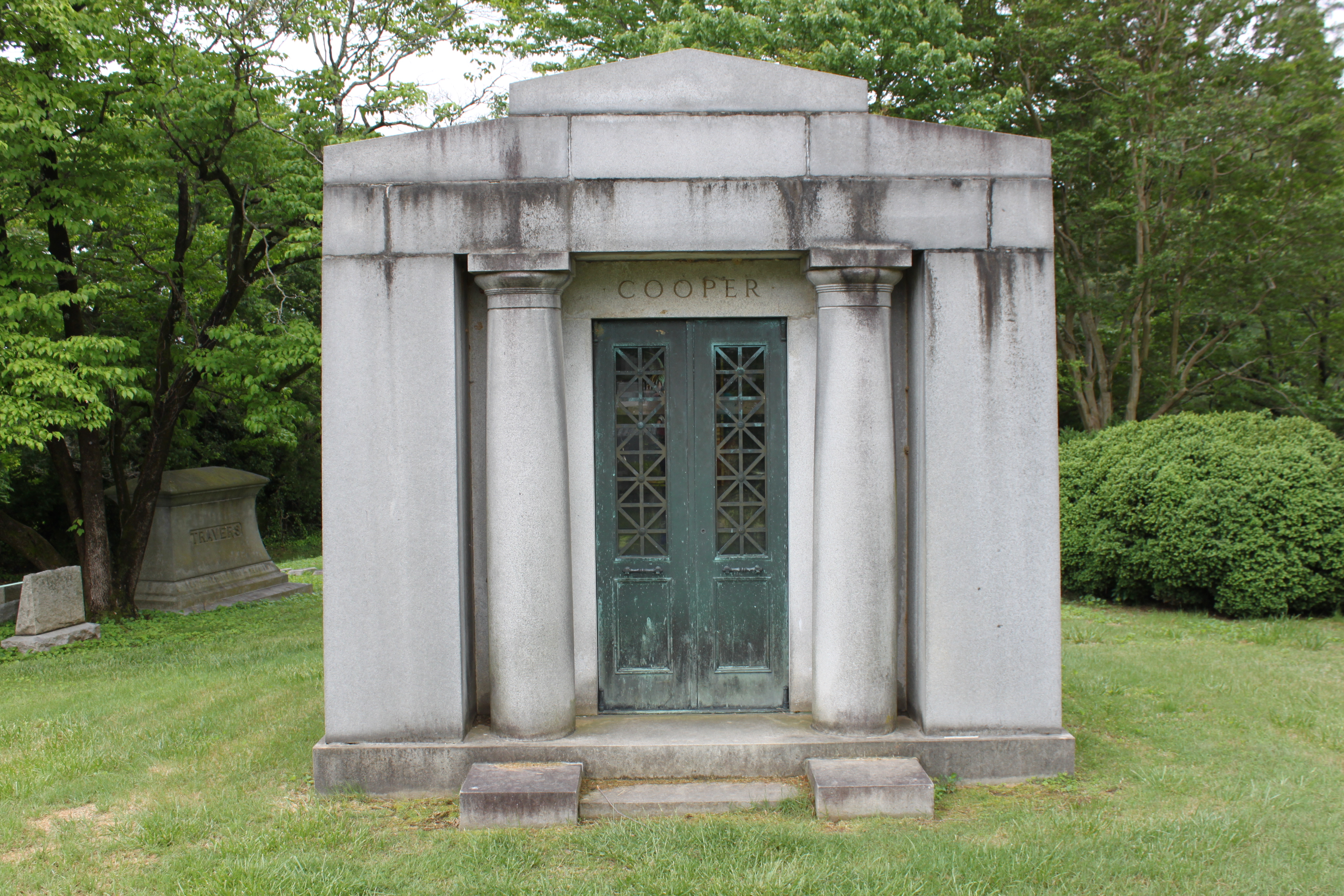
Edward Cooper

- James Branch Cabell (1879–1958), fantasy fiction novelist
- James Cannon Jr. (1864–1944), Methodist bishop
- James E. Cannon (1873–1942), Virginia state senator (1914–23)
- Thomas Henry Carter (1831–1908), Confederate artillery officer
- John Samuels Caskie (1821–1869), U.S. Congressman (1851–59)
- Ralph T. Catterall (1897–1978), judge, Virginia State Corporation Commission (1949–73)
- Alvin Duke Chandler (1902–1987), naval officer and president of College of William & Mary
- Robert H. Chilton (1815–1879), US Army Officer, Confederate General, American Civil War
- George Llewellyn Christian (1841–1924), Confederate soldier and judge
- Emily Tapscott Clark (1892–1953), writer and editor
- Joseph Calvitt Clarke Jr. (1920–2004), judge of the U.S. District Court
- Philip St. George Cocke (1809–1861), Confederate General, American Civil War
- Raleigh Edward Colston (1825–1896), Confederate Civil War general and VMI professor
- Asbury Christian Compton (1929–2006), Justice, Supreme Court of Virginia (1974–2000)
- Huestis P. Cook (1868–1951), photographer
- John Rogers Cooke (1833–1891), Confederate General, American Civil War
- Edward Cooper (1873–1928), U.S. Congressman
- Edwin Cox (1902–1977), chemist and military officer
- Jabez Lamar Monroe Curry (1825–1903), U.S. and Confederate Congressman, Civil War veteran, and President of Howard College in Alabama and Richmond College in Virginia. His statue is in Statuary Hall in the U.S. Capitol
- John A. Curtis (1834–1913), state delegate
- Wilfred Emory Cutshaw (1838–1907), Confederate Army colonel and city engineer for Richmond

== D ==
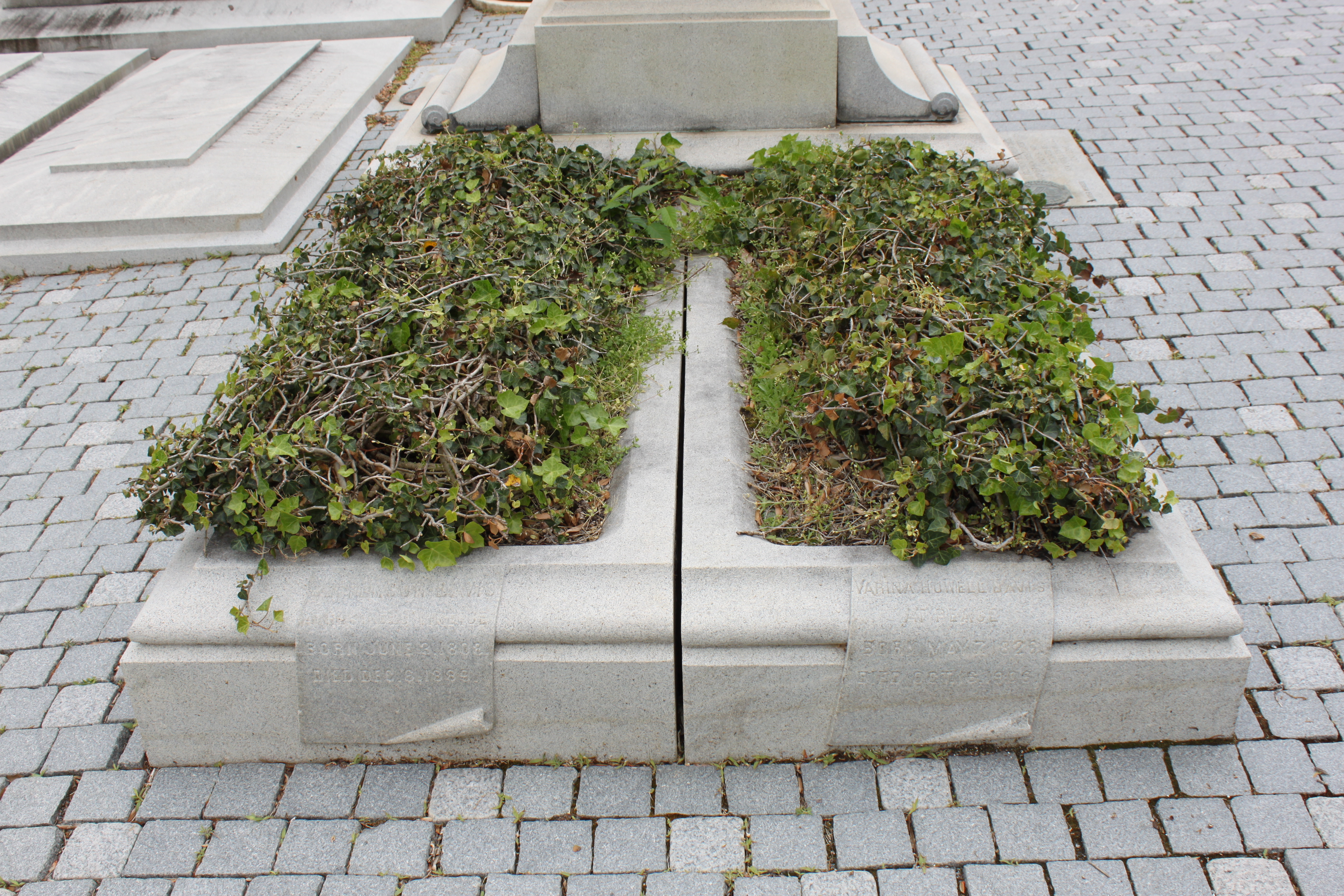
Jefferson Davis and Varina Davis

- Virginius Dabney (1901–1995) author, journalist, editor of the Richmond Times-Dispatch from 1936 to 1969, Pulitzer Prize winner
- Peter V. Daniel (1784–1860), U.S. Supreme Court Associate Justice
- Raleigh Travers Daniel (1805–1877), Attorney General of Virginia, member of Virginia House of Delegates
- Robert Williams Daniel (1884–1940), Virginia State Senator and RMS Titanic survivor. Father of Robert Daniel
- Robert Daniel (1936–2012), U.S. Representative from Virginia. Son of Robert Williams Daniel
- Margaret May Dashiell (1867–1958), artist and writer
- Jefferson Davis (1808–1889), President of the Confederate States of America
- Varina Davis (1826–1906), second wife of Jefferson Davis
- Varina Anne Davis (1864–1898), author, daughter of Jefferson Davis
- Edmund DeJarnette (1897–1966), member of the Virginia House of Delegates
- Edmund DeJarnette (1938–2015), U.S. Ambassador to Central African Republic, Tanzania and Angola
- Collins Denny Jr. (1899–1964), lawyer
- David Seth Doggett (1810–1880), bishop of the Methodist Episcopal Church, South
- James H. Dooley (1841–1922), Virginia state representative

== E ==
- Edward Edmonds (1835–1863), Confederate Colonel of the 38th Virginia Infantry, killed-in-action during Pickett's Charge
- Horace Hall Edwards (1902–1987), member of Virginia House of Delegates, mayor of Richmond and candidate for governor of Virginia
- Tazewell Ellett (1856–1914), U.S. Representative from Virginia
- Henry K. Ellyson (1823–1890), Virginia state representative
- James Taylor Ellyson (1847–1919), Lieutenant Governor of Virginia (1906–18)

== F ==
- Minetree Folkes (died 1959), member of the Virginia House of Delegates and U.S. House of Representatives
- Douglas Southall Freeman (1886–1953), journalist and historian; author of definitive biographies of George Washington and Confederate General Robert E. Lee; namesake of a local high school

== G ==
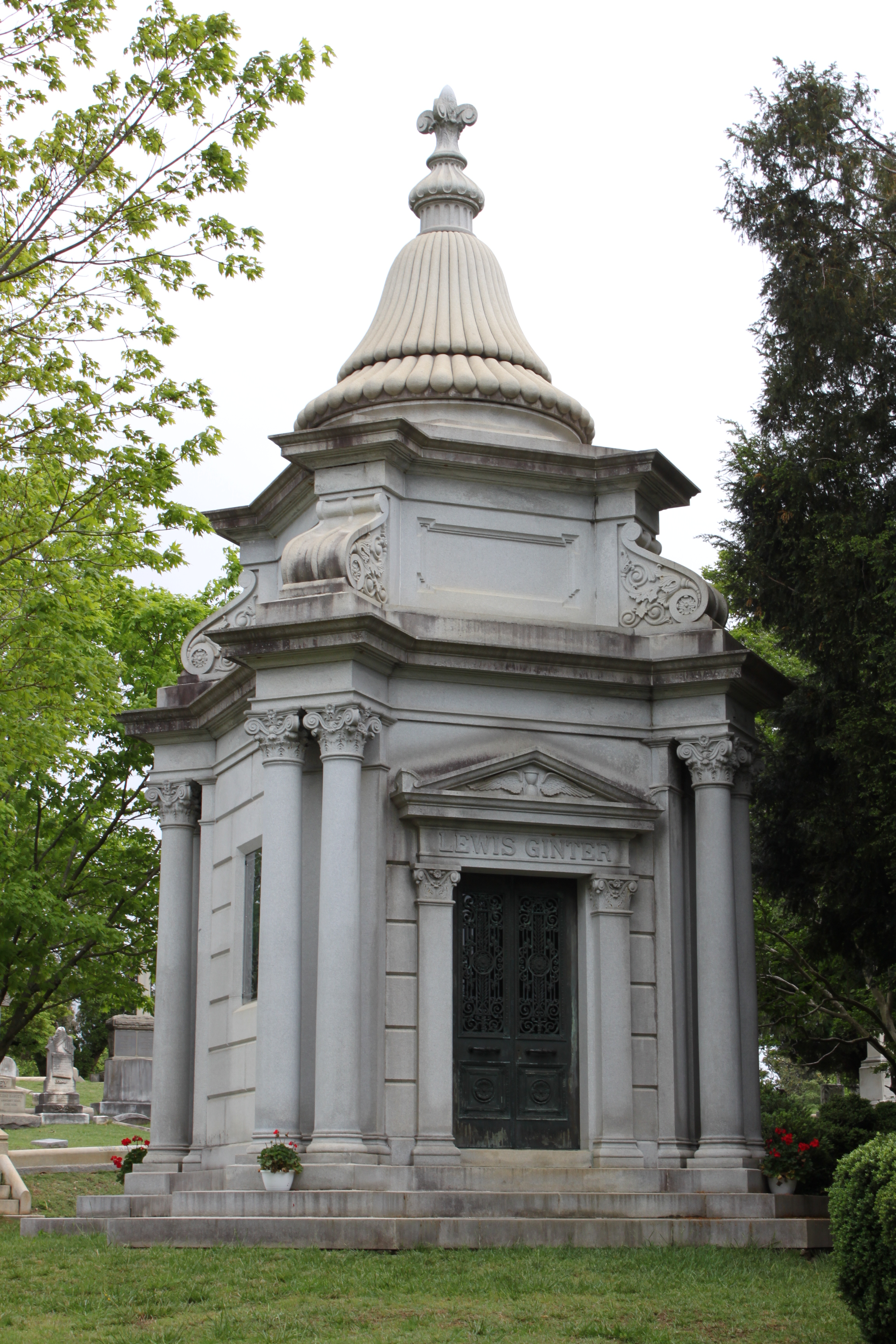
Lewis Ginter

- Richard B. Garnett (1817–1863), U.S. Army officer and Confederate general killed during Battle of Gettysburg
- J. Vaughan Gary (1892–1973), U.S. Congressman (1945–65)
- Thomas B. Gay (1885–1983), lawyer
- Robert Atkinson Gibson (d. 1919), Bishop of the Episcopal Diocese of Virginia (1902–19)
- Lewis Ginter (1824–1897), tobacco executive, philanthropist
- Ellen Glasgow (1873–1945), Pulitzer Prize winning novelist
- Thomas Christian Gordon Jr. (1915–2003), Justice, Supreme Court of Virginia (1965–1972)
- W. Douglas Gordon (1876–1944), newspaper editor
- Maria Hester Monroe Gouverneur (1802–1850), Daughter of fifth U.S. President James Monroe
- Peachy R. Grattan (1801–1881), lawyer and law reporter
- Edward Meeks Gregory (1922–1995), Episcopal priest who performed the first gay marriage in Richmond
- George C. Gregory (1878–1956), attorney, businessman, historian and author
- Walter Gwynn (1802–1882), Confederate Brigadier General

== H ==
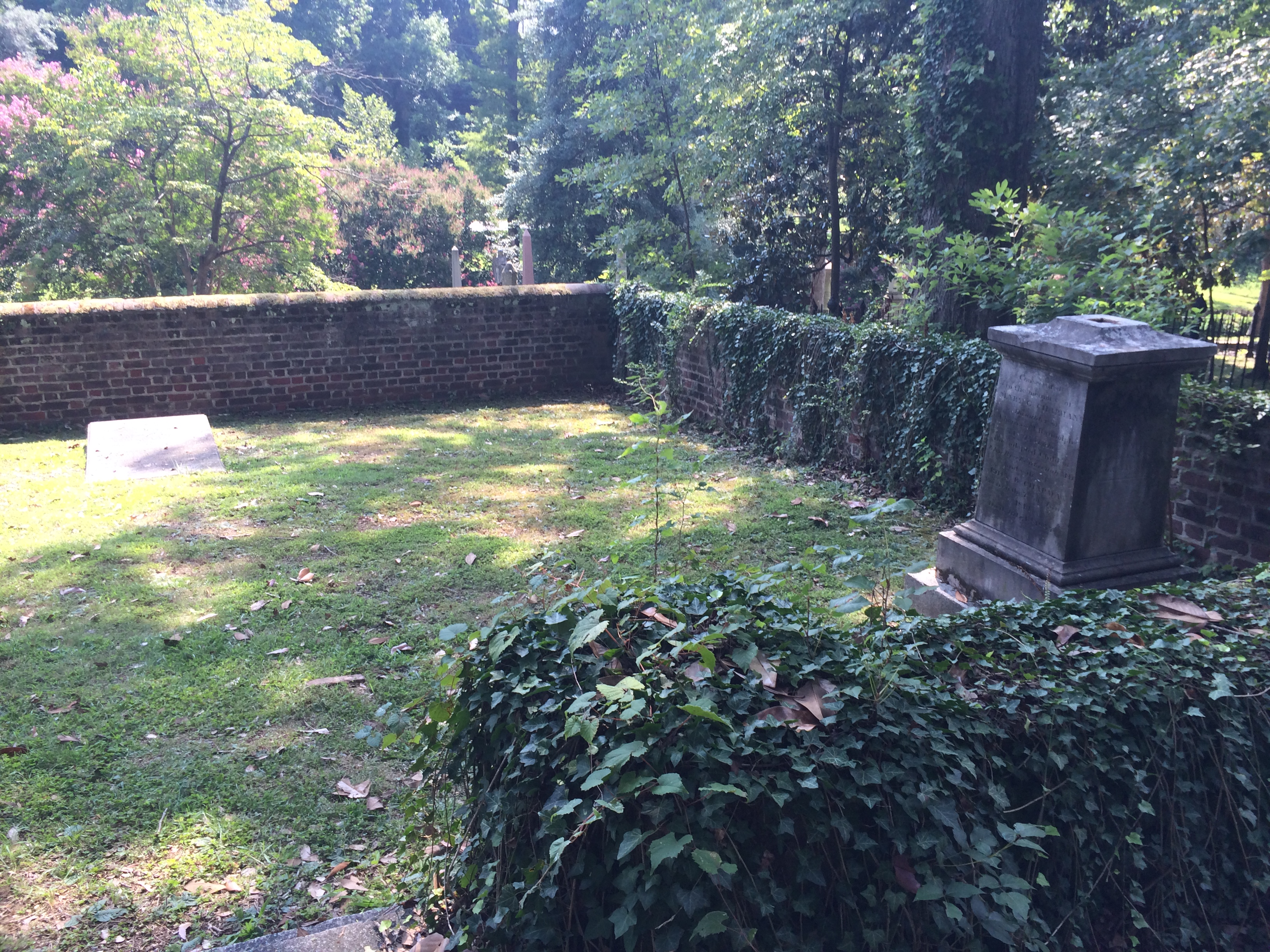
John Harvie

- John Henry Hager (1936–2020), Lt. Governor of Virginia from 1998 to 2002
- John Lesslie Hall (1856–1928), literary scholar and poet
- James Dandridge Halyburton (1803–1879), U.S. and Confederate judge, Eastern District of Virginia (1843–65)
- David Bullock Harris (1814–1864), Confederate Colonel
- John Harvie (1742–1807), lawyer and builder, delegate to the Continental Congress, Signer of The Articles of Confederation
- Orie Latham Hatcher (1868–1946), education reformer
- Eliza Monroe Hay (1786–1840), daughter of U.S. President James Monroe. Formerly buried in the Père Lachaise Cemetery from 1840 to 2025.
- William Wirt Henry (1831–1900), lawyer, member of the General Assembly of Va., president of the Am. Historical Association (1890–91)
- Henry Heth (1825–1899), U.S. Army officer and Confederate general, participated at the Battle of Gettysburg
- Julien Hill (1877–1943), football coach of Richmond College and banker
- Alexis Hobson (1880–1960), college football player
- Eppa Hunton (1822–1908), U.S. Representative and Senator, Confederate brigadier general
- Eppa Hunton Jr. (1855–1932), lawyer, member of the House of Delegates, president of the Virginia Bar Association
- Eppa Hunton IV (1904–1976), lawyer, rector of Virginia Commonwealth University

== I ==
- John D. Imboden (1823–1895), lawyer, teacher, Virginia legislator, Confederate cavalry general and partisan fighter

== J ==
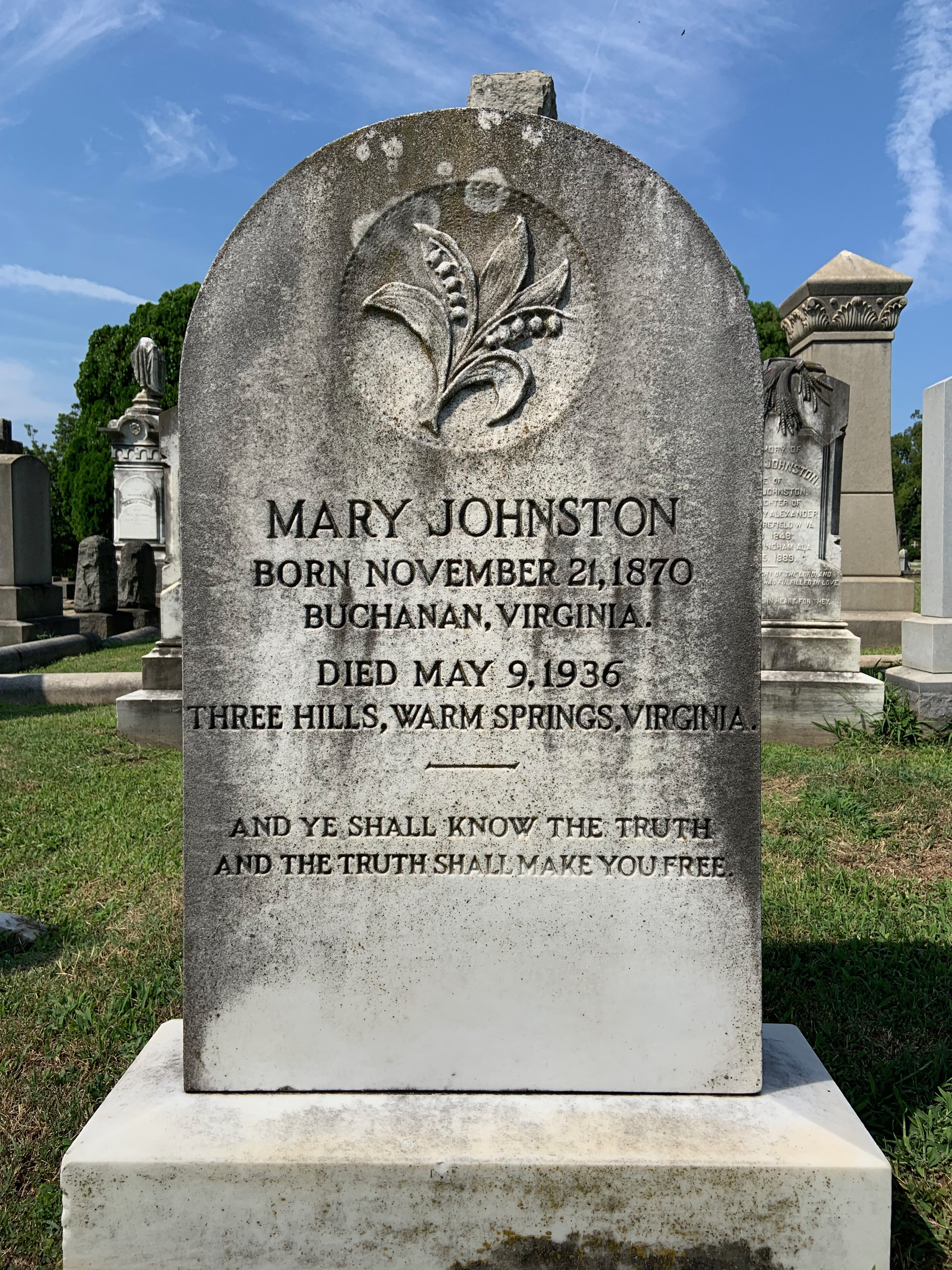
Mary Johnston

- Georgia May Jobson (1860–1924), temperance reformer
- Edward Johnson (1816–1873), U.S. Army officer and Confederate general, American Civil War
- Mary Johnston (1870–1936), novelist and women's rights advocate
- David Rumph Jones (1825–1863), U.S. Army officer and Confederate General, American Civil War
- Mildred Callahan Jones (1943–2008), decorative flag businesswoman
- Samuel Jones (1819–1887), U.S. Army, Confederate General, American Civil War

== K ==
- James Keith (1839–1918), member of House of Delegates, chief judge of Supreme Court of Virginia
- Wythe Leigh Kinsolving (1878–1964), Episcopal priest, writer, poet, political advocate
- Charlotte Kohler (1908–2008), magazine editor and educator

== L ==
- John Lamb (1840–1924), U.S. Congressman (1897–1913)
- Dabney S. Lancaster (1889–1975), educator and state government official
- Edward E. Lane (1924–2009), member of the Virginia House of Delegates
- W. Duncan Lee (1884–1952), architect
- Fitzhugh Lee (1835–1905), Confederate cavalry general, Governor of Virginia, diplomat, U.S. Army general in Spanish–American War and the nephew of General Robert E. Lee
- Thomas M. Logan (1840–1914), Confederate General
- Marion K. Lowry (1854–1939), member of the Virginia House of Delegates
- Albert Lybrock (1827–1886), architect
- James Lyons (1801–1882), politician, Confederate Congressman

== M ==
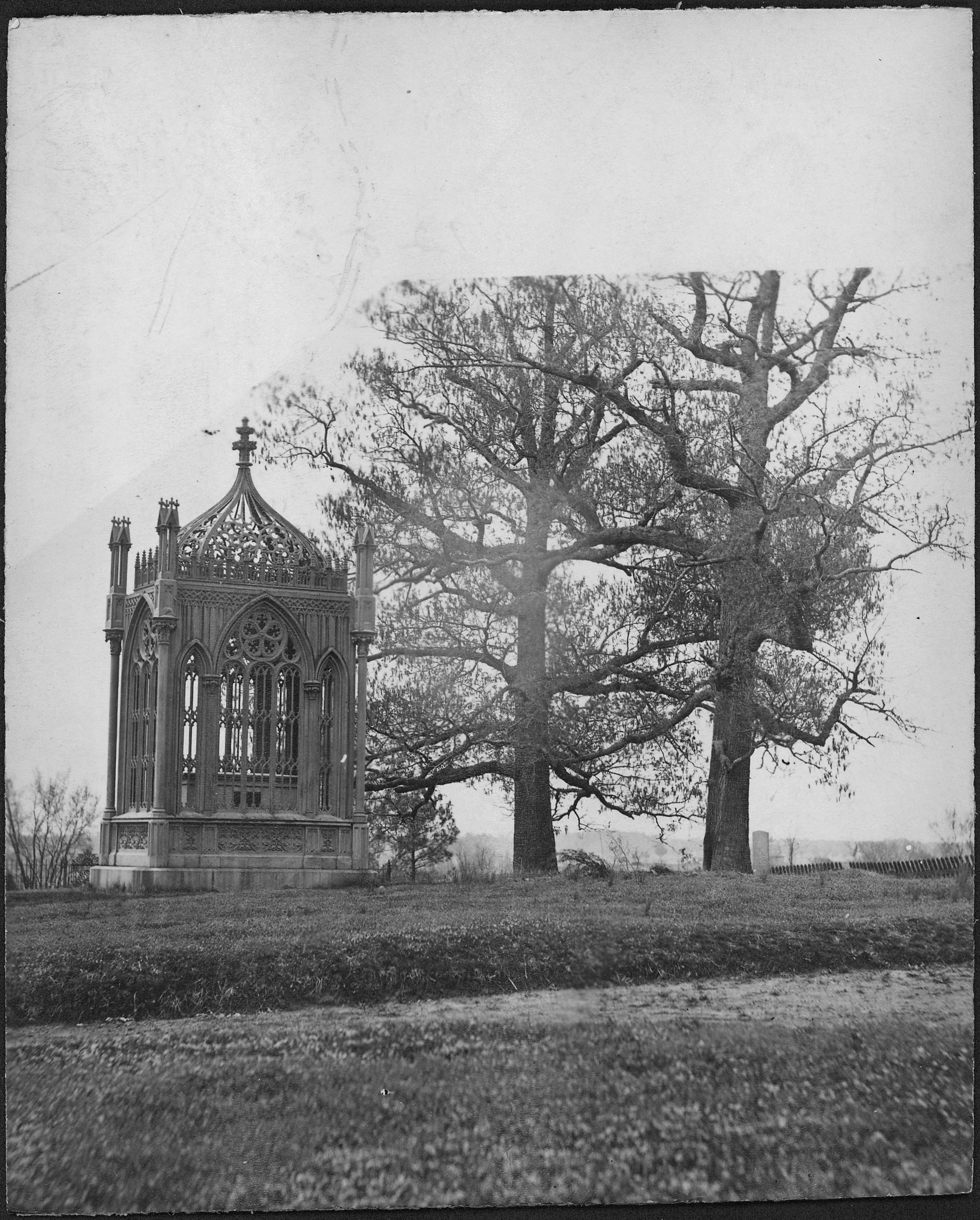
Tomb of James Monroe. Photo by Mathew Brady.

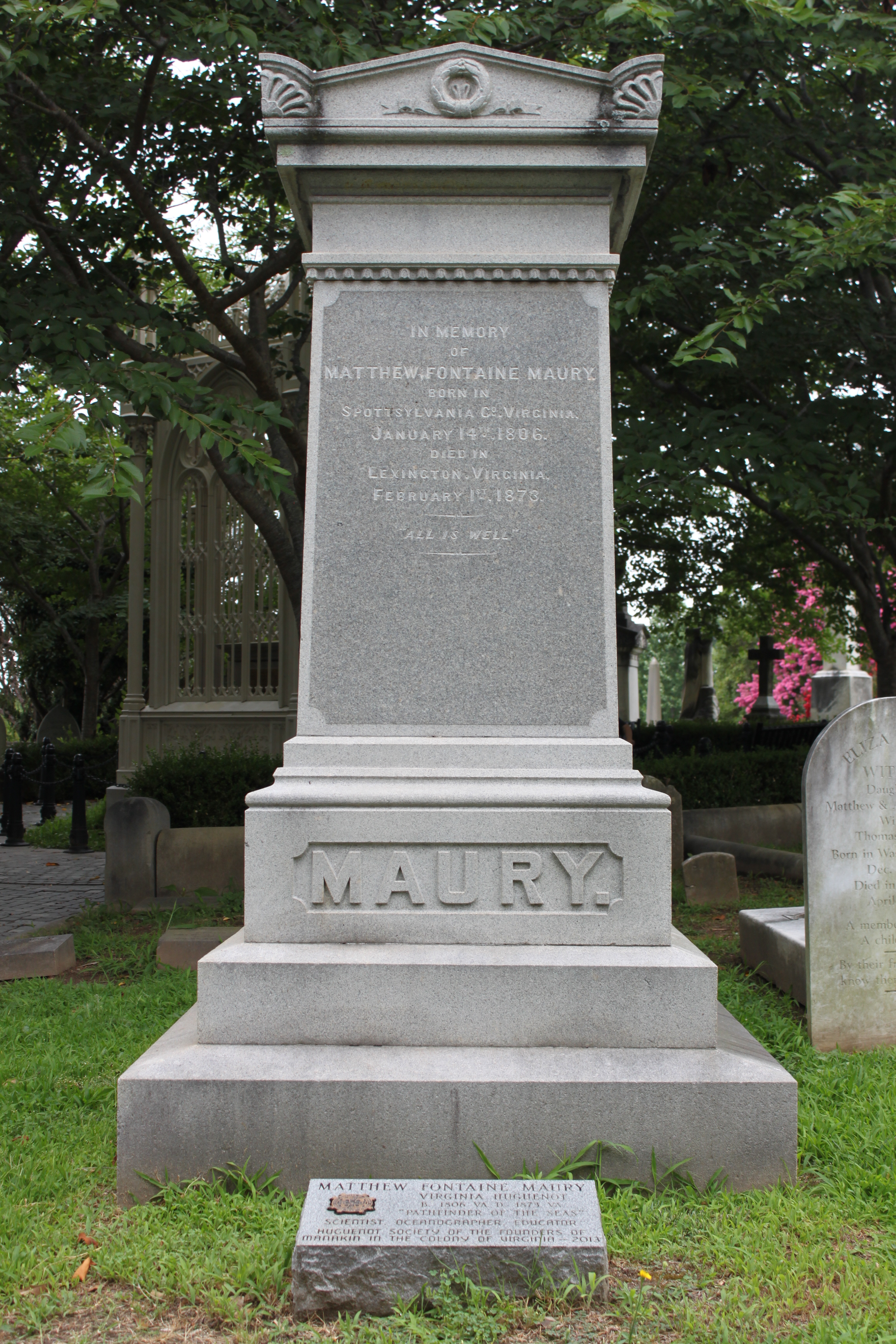
Matthew Fontaine Maury

- John Y. Mason (1799–1859), U.S. Congressman, Secretary of the Navy, 18th Attorney General of the United States, Minister to France, judge
- Matthew Fontaine Maury (1806–1873), oceanographer and Confederate Navy officer
- William Mayo (1685–1744), civil engineer
- David J. Mays (1896–1971) author and lawyer
- Angus William McDonald (1799–1864), lawyer, military officer and colonel in the Confederate States Army
- Cornelia Peake McDonald (1822–1909), diarist
- Hunter McGuire (1835–1900), Confederate Army surgeon who amputated General Thomas J. "Stonewall" Jackson's arm after Jackson was mistakenly shot by Confederate soldiers at Chancellorsville . (Despite McGuire's efforts, Jackson later died of pneumonia.) After the war, McGuire founded the Virginia College of Medicine, and was president of the American Medical Association
- David Gregg McIntosh (1836–1916), lawyer, Confederate officer
- Robert Merhige (1919–2005), Federal judge
- Carroll Miller (1875–1949), chairman of the Interstate Commerce Commission
- Emma Guffey Miller (1874–1970), feminist activist and Democratic leader
- John Lucas Miller (1831–1864), attorney, Confederate colonel
- Polk Miller (1844–1913), pharmacist and musician
- Willis Dance Miller (1893–1960), Justice, Virginia Supreme Court of Appeals (1947–60)
- Charles Minnigerode (1814–1894), educator and clerrgyman
- Elizabeth Monroe (1768–1830), U.S. First Lady, wife of James Monroe
- James Monroe (1758–1831), fifth President of the United States
- Richard Channing Moore (1762–1841), Second Bishop of the Episcopal Diocese of Virginia (1814–41)
- Samuel P. Moore (1813–1889), Confederate Surgeon General
- Beverley B. Munford (1856–1910), Virginia state delegate and state senator
- Mary-Cooke Branch Munford (1865–1938), civic leader; education, women's suffrage, and civil rights activist

== N ==
- Garnett Nelson (1873–1930), college football coach and physician

== O ==
- Charles Triplett O'Ferrall (1840–1905), Governor of Virginia (1894–98)
- Robert Ould (1820–1882), Attorney, Confederate official
- George W. Owings Jr. (1907–1984), member of the Maryland House of Delegates

== P ==
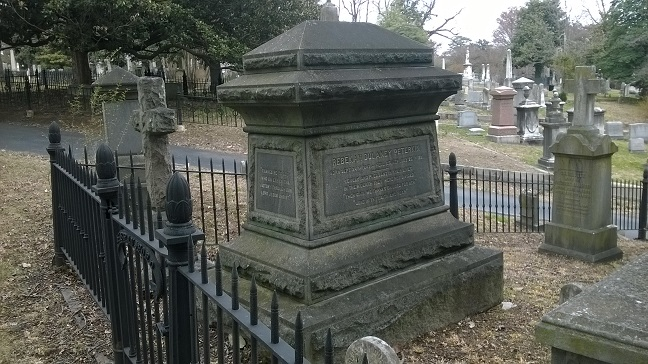
Rebekah Dulaney Peterkin

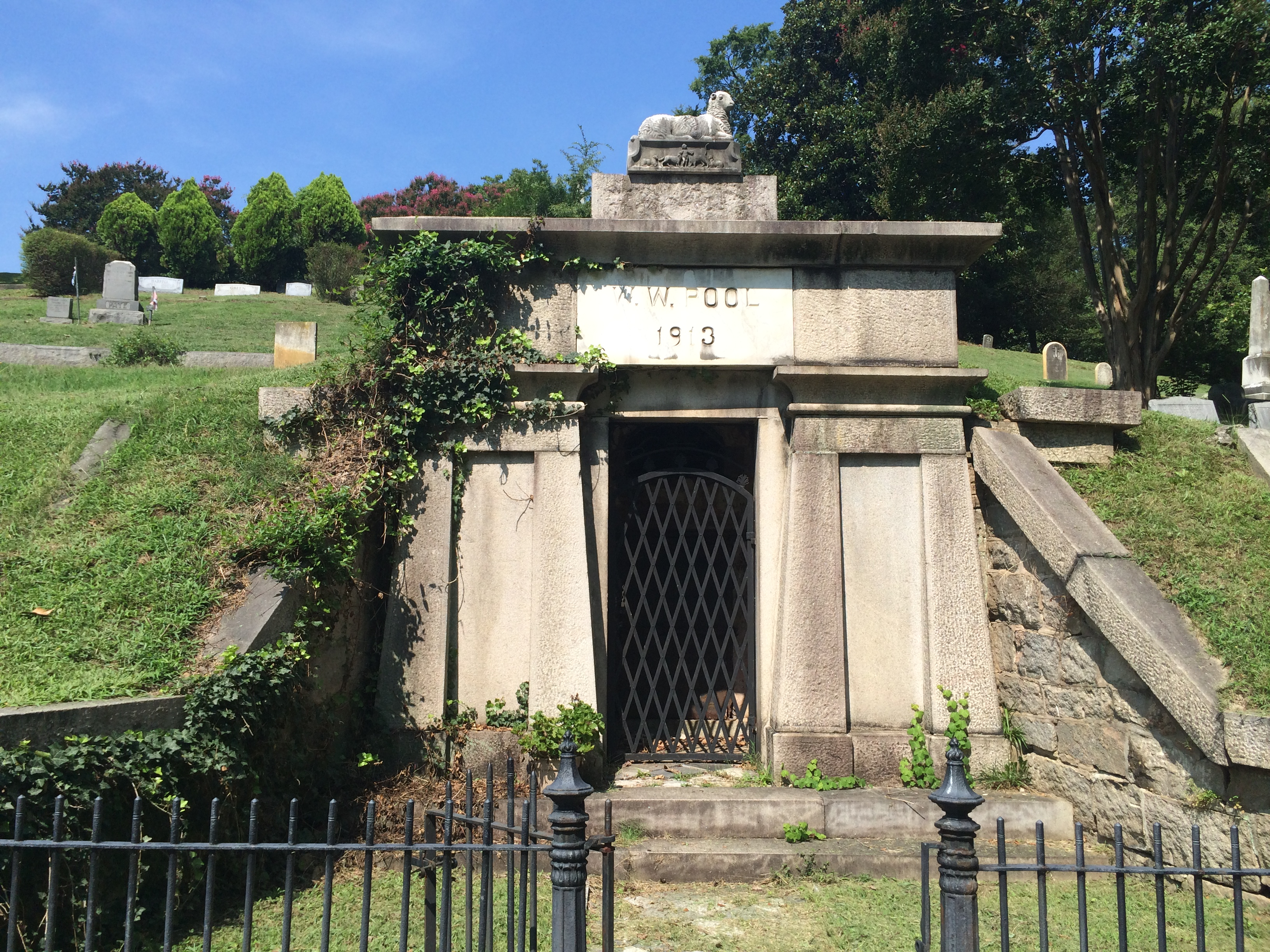
William Wortham Pool

- William Nelson Page (1854–1932), civil engineer, railway industrialist, co-founder of the Virginian Railway
- William Henry Palmer (1835–1926), Confederate officer
- T. Nelson Parker (1898–1973), mayor of Richmond, Virginia commissioner of insurance
- Sallie Partington (1834–1907), actress
- John Pegram (1832–1865), U.S. Army officer, Confederate Army brigadier general
- William Pegram (1841–1865), U.S. Army officer, Confederate Army colonel
- Edward Peple (1869–1924), playwright
- George William Peterkin (1841–1916), Episcopal bishop
- Rebekah Dulaney Peterkin (1847–1891), philanthropist
- George Pickett (1825–1875), U.S. Army officer, Confederate Army general, participated in Battle of Gettysburg
- LaSalle Corbell Pickett (1843–1931), author, wife of George Pickett
- Malcolm Pitt (1897–1985), football, basketball, and baseball coach at the University of Richmond
- Walter Ashby Plecker (1861–1947), First Registrar for the Virginia Bureau of Vital Statistics, white supremacist
- William Swan Plumer (1802–1880), Presbyterian clergyman, educator and author
- Frederick Gresham Pollard (1918–2003), Lieutenant Governor of Virginia from 1966 to 1970
- John Garland Pollard (1871–1937), Governor of Virginia from 1930 to 1934
- Robert Nelson Pollard (1880–1954), Judge, U.S. District Court for the Eastern District of Virginia from 1936 to 1954
- William Wortham Pool (1842–1922), bookkeeper; tomb became associated with the Richmond Vampire
- John Pope, business executive (Allen & Ginter) (1856–96)
- John Powell (1882–1963), composer, ethnomusicologist and segregationist
- Lewis Franklin Powell Jr. (1907–1998), U.S. Supreme Court justice
- Samuel H. Pulliam (1841–1908), Virginia State Representative
- Bennet Puryear Jr. (1884–1982), Major General, USMC

== R ==
- John Randolph (1773–1833), politician, leader in Congress from Virginia
- William Francis Rhea (1858–1931), Virginia lawyer, judge, and U.S. Congressman
- Eudora Ramsay Richardson (1891–1973), women's suffrage activist and writer
- Caroline Richings (died 1882), American composer and musician
- Thomas Ritchie (1778–1854), newspaper journalist, editor and publisher of the Richmond Enquirer
- Charles M. Robinson (1867–1932), architect
- Conway Robinson (1805–1884), member of the Virginia House of Delegates
- Dana Rucker (1868–1949), football coach of Richmond College
- Carl Ruehrmund (1855–1927), architect

== S ==
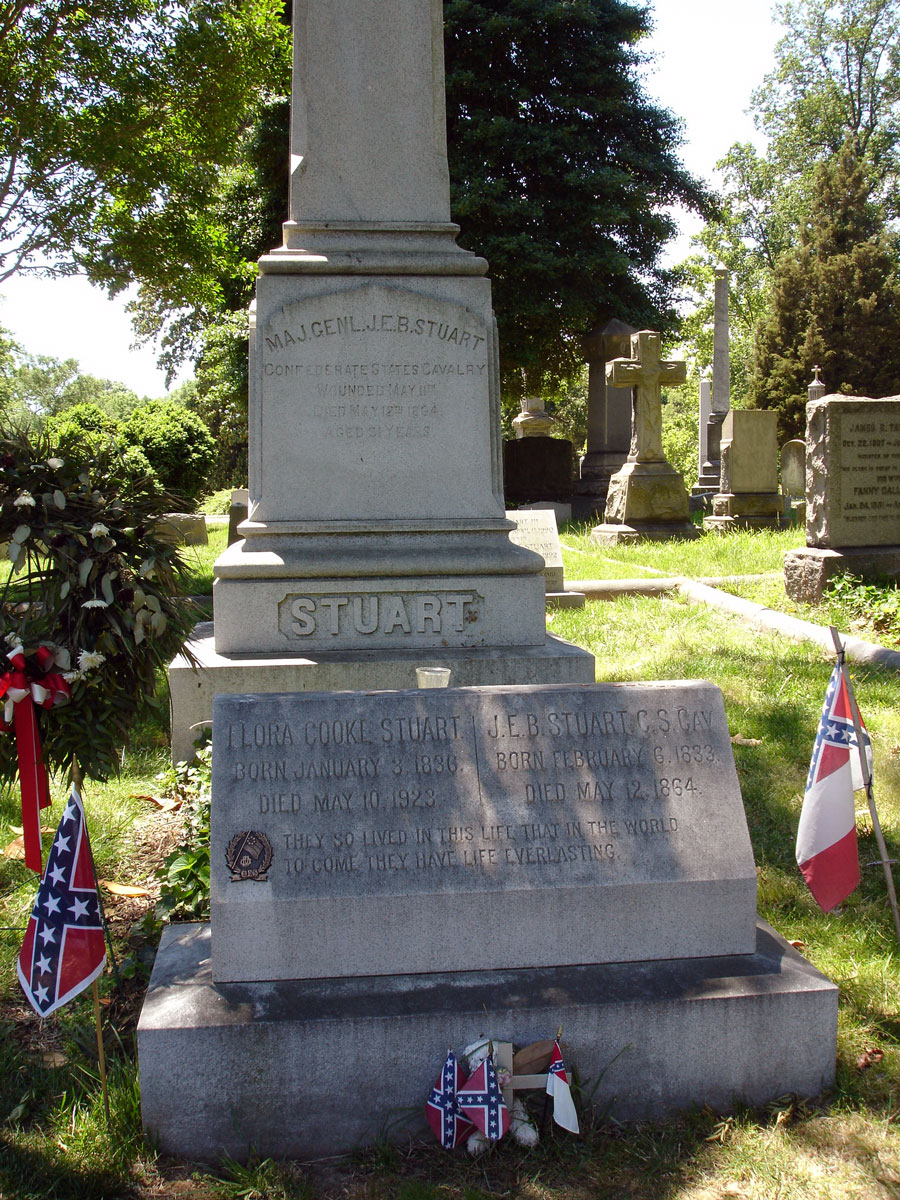
J. E. B. Stuart

- Emma Speed Sampson (1868–1947), writer
- John C. C. Sanders (1840–1864), Confederate brigadier general
- Dave Edward Satterfield Jr. (1894–1946), U.S. Congressman 1937–46
- Conrad Frederick Sauer (1866–1927), founder of the C. F. Sauer Company
- David J. Saunders (1811–1873), state delegate and mayor of Richmond
- James Benjamin Sclater Jr. (1847–1882), co-founder of the Pi Kappa Alpha fraternity
- Mary Wingfield Scott (1898–1983), historic preservationist
- James Alexander Seddon (1815–1880), U.S. Congressman (1845–1851); Confederate Secretary of War
- Henry G. Shirley (1874–1941), Virginia civil servant
- George Alvin Smith (1844–1908), merchant
- Thomas J. Smith (1838–1918), member of the Virginia House of Delegates, chief justice of the New Mexico Territorial Supreme Court
- William Alexander Smith (1828–1888), U.S. Congressman from North Carolina (1873–75)
- William Andrew Smith (1802–1870), president of Randolph-Macon College and Central Methodist University, clergyman
- William "Extra Billy" Smith (1797–1887), two-time governor of Virginia, Confederate general
- Harold Fleming Snead (1903–1987), Justice, Supreme Court of Virginia (1957–74)
- Isaac M. St. John (1827–1880), Confederate General, American Civil War
- Leroy Augustus Stafford (1822–1864), Confederate Army brigadier general
- Mary Newton Stanard (1865–1929), historian
- William E. Starke (1814–1862), Confederate general killed at the Battle of Antietam
- Walter Husted Stevens (1827–1867), U.S. Army lieutenant, C.S.A general
- J. E. B. Stuart (1833–1864), American soldier, Confederate Army general
- Claude Augustus Swanson (1862–1939), Governor of Virginia (1906–10), U.S. Secretary of the Navy (1933–39)
- Elizabeth Lyons Swanson (1863–1920), socialite and First Lady of Virginia

== T ==
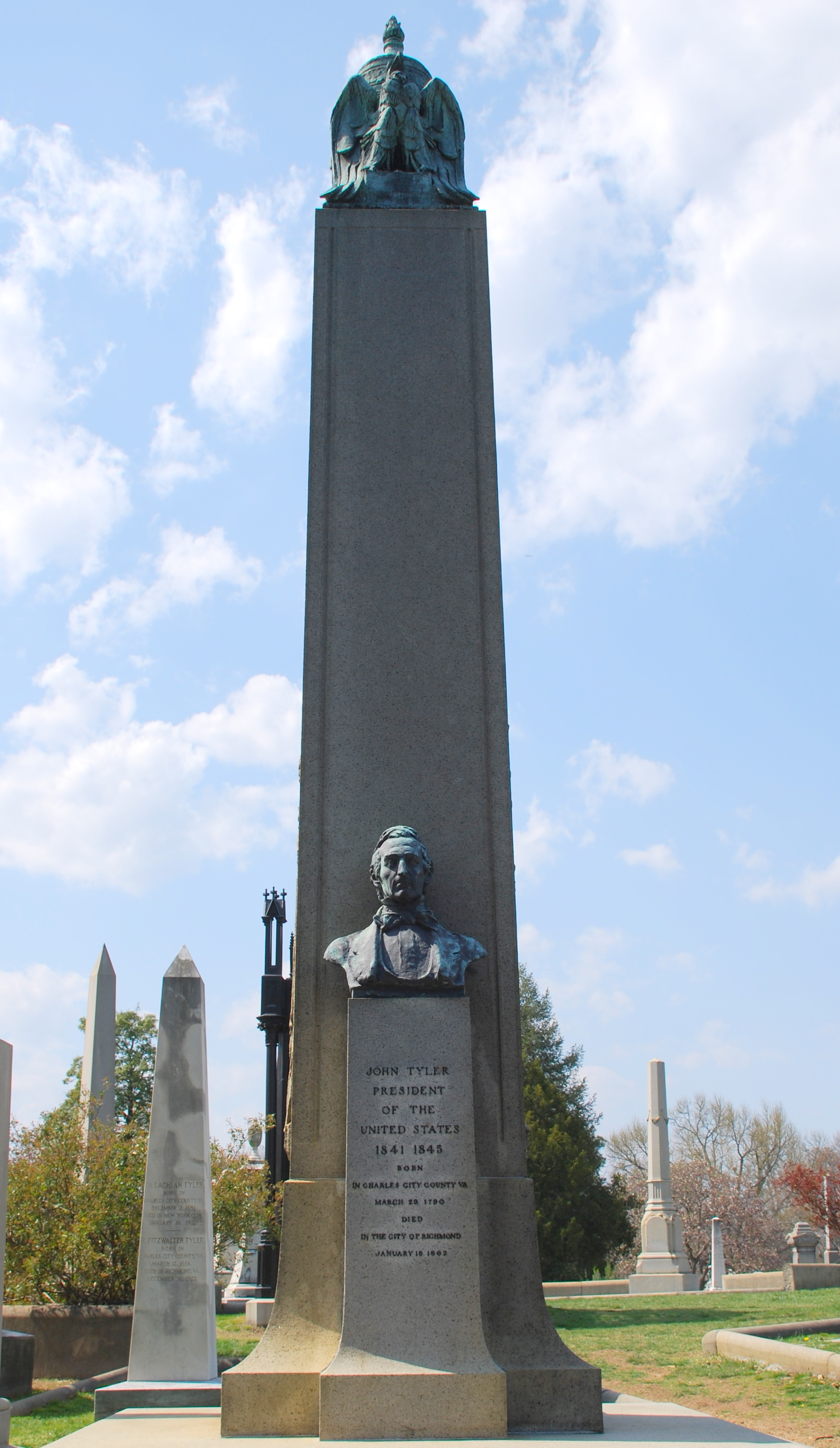
John Tyler

- John Banister Tabb (1845–1909), poet and priest
- William Elam Tanner (1836–1898), businessman
- William R. Terry (1827–1897), C.S.A general, American Civil War
- J. Randolph Tucker Jr. (1914–2015), state delegate and judge
- John Randolph Tucker (1879–1954), lawyer and civic leader
- Edna Henry Lee Turpin (1867–1952), author
- David Gardiner Tyler (1846–1927), Democratic politician, U.S. Congressman, and the fourth son of President John Tyler
- John Tyler (1790–1862), tenth President of the United States, a delegate to the Provisional Confederate Congress in 1861, and elected to the House of Representatives of the Confederate Congress
- Julia Gardiner Tyler (1820–1889), U.S. First Lady, wife of John Tyler
- Lyon Gardiner Tyler (1853–1935), historian, president of the College of William and Mary and the seventh son of President John Tyler

== V ==
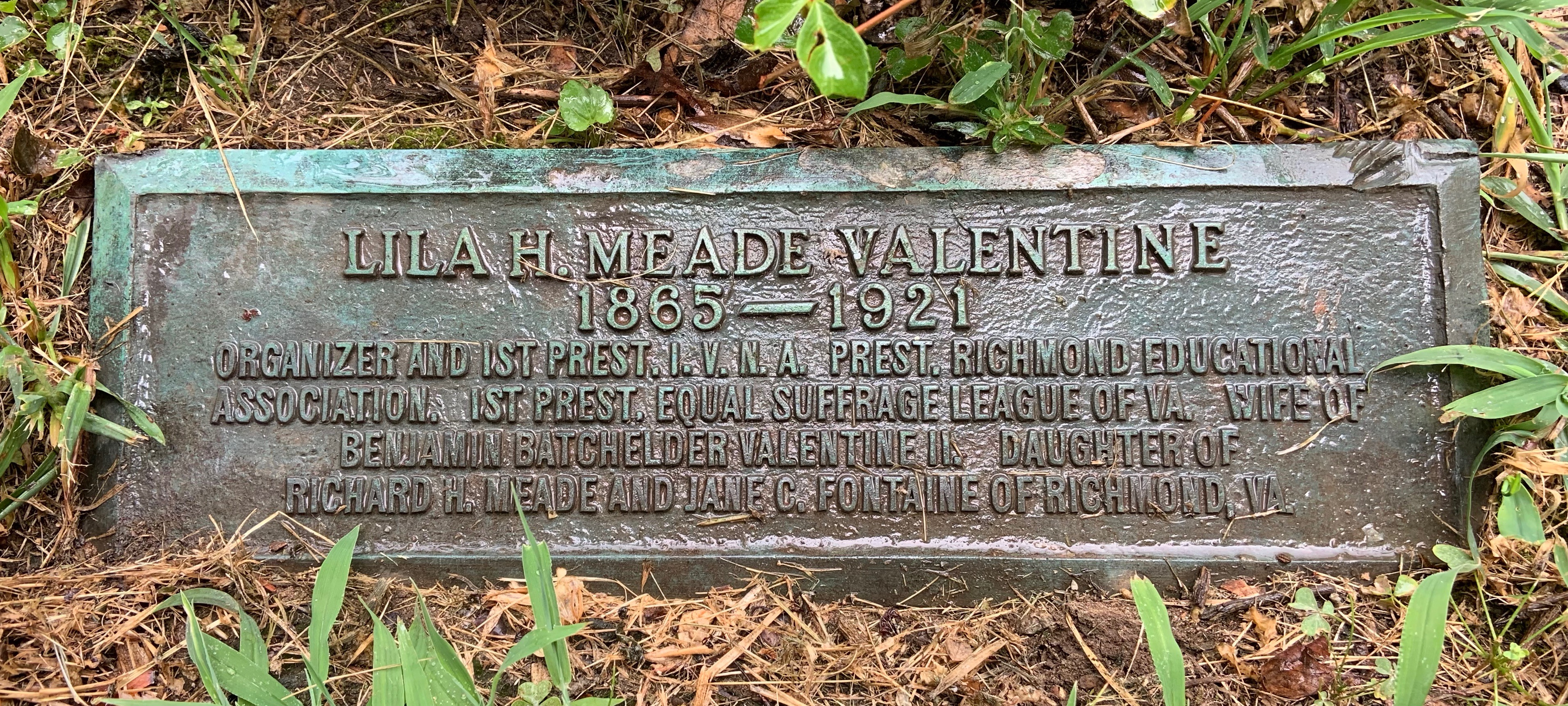
Lila Meade Valentine

- Edward Virginius Valentine (1838–1930), sculptor
- Lila Meade Valentine (1865–1921), health care and education reformer, suffragist

== W ==
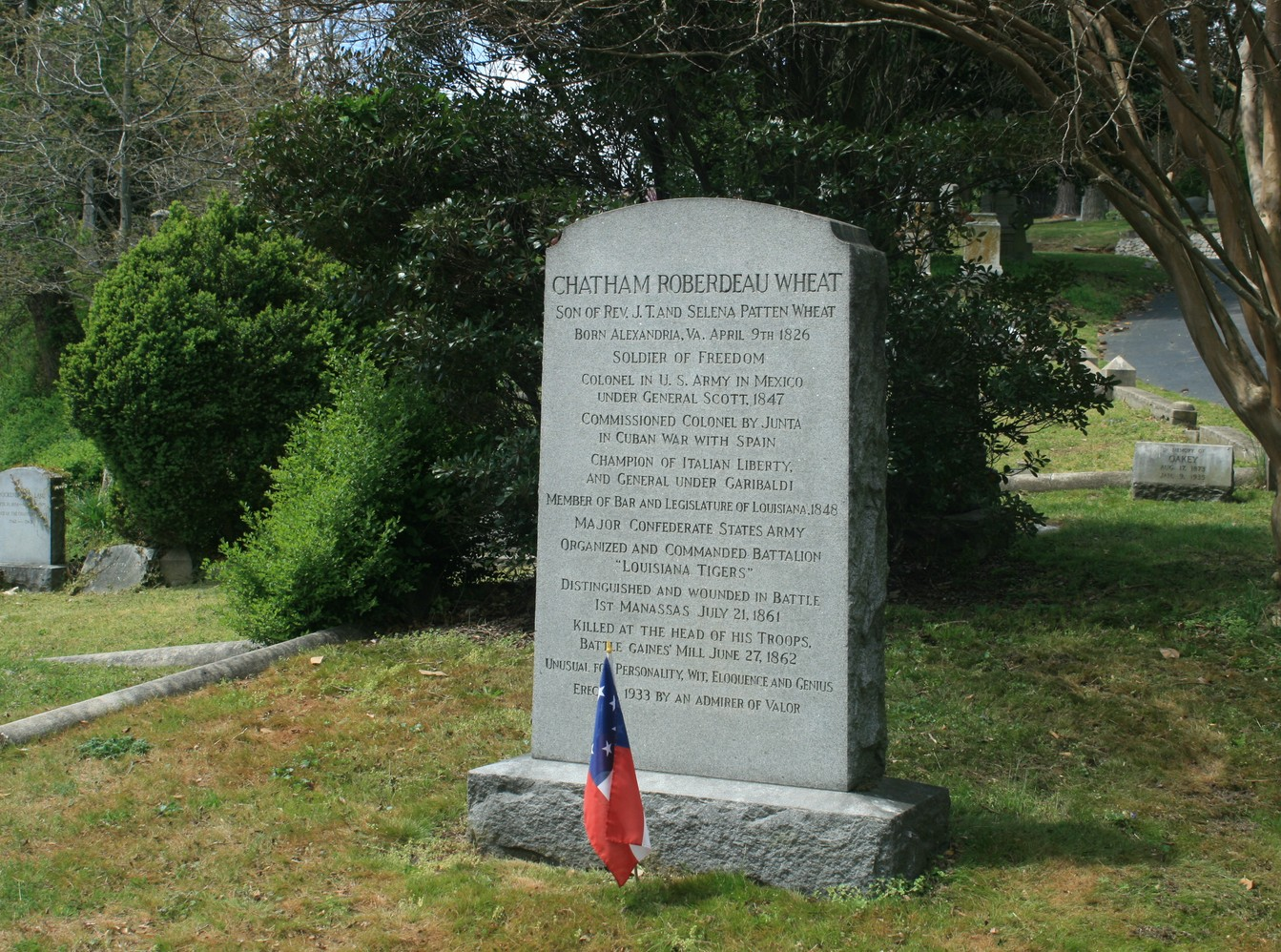
Chatham Roberdeau Wheat

- Edmund Waddill Jr. (1855–1931), U.S. Congressman (1889–1891); U.S. judge Fourth Circuit Court of Appeals (1921–31)
- Dugald Stewart Walker (1883–1937), illustrator
- Reuben Lindsay Walker (1827–1890), Confederate Army general
- Alexander Wilbourne Weddell (1876–1948), U.S. Ambassador to Argentina (1933–39) and Spain (1939–42)
- Beverly R. Wellford (1797–1870), Sixth President of the American Medical Association
- Louis O. Wendenburg (1861–1934), Member of the Senate of Virginia (1912–20)
- Albert L. West (1825–1892), architect
- Chatham Roberdeau Wheat (1826–1862), Confederate Army officer
- John Baker White (1794–1862), American military officer, lawyer, civil servant, and Clerk of Court for Hampshire County, Virginia (1815–61)
- Francis McNeece Whittle (1823–1902), Bishop of the Episcopal Diocese of Virginia (1876–1902)
- John J. Wicker Jr. (1893–1985), lawyer and Virginia state senator
- Henry T. Wickham (1849–1943), Virginia State Representative and State Senator
- John A. Wilcox (1819–1864), U.S. Congressman (1851–1853); Confederate Congressman
- Adele Williams (1868–1952), painter
- Channing Moore Williams (1829–1910), Missionary Bishop of the Episcopal Diocese of China and Japan
- E. Randolph Williams (1871–1952), lawyer
- Langbourne Williams (1903–1994), businessman
- Lewis B. Williams Jr. (1833–1863), Confederate colonel
- Richard Leroy Williams (1923–2011), U.S. district court judge Eastern District of Virginia (1980–2011)
- George Douglas Wise (1831–1908), U.S. Congressman (1881–95)
- Henry A. Wise (1806–1876), Governor of Virginia, Confederate Army general
- John Sergeant Wise (1846–1913), U.S. Congressman (1883–85)
- Richard Alsop Wise (1843–1900), U.S. Congressman (1897–1901)
- Tom Wolfe (1930–2018), American author and journalist known for his association with New Journalism
- Serge Wolkonsky (1860–1937), Russian theatrical worker, son of Mikhail Sergeevich
- Marcellus E. Wright Sr. (1881–1962), architect
- Henry Lawson Wyatt (1841–1861), first Confederate Army enlisted soldier from North Carolina to die in the American Civil War
