= Kathleen Bruce =

Kathleen Bruce may refer to:

- Kathleen Scott (1878–1947), née Bruce, British sculptor
- Kathleen Bruce (historian) (1885–1950), American historian
