= David Burr =

David Burr may refer to:

- David C. Burr (1783–1827), American state legislator from Maine and Massachusetts
- David H. Burr, (1803–1875), American cartographer, surveyor and topographer
- David Judson Burr (1820–1876), American state legislator from Virginia
- David Burr (Canadian politician), mayor of Windsor, Ontario, 1986–1988
