= William Elam Tanner =

American politician (1836–1898)

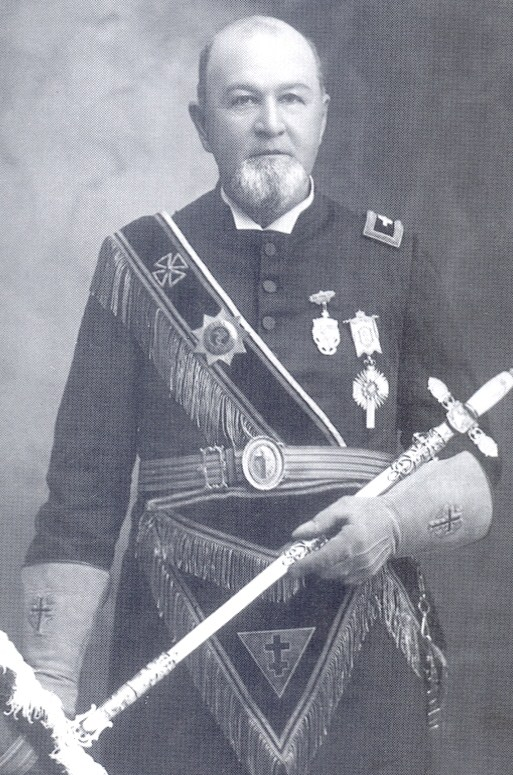

Member of the Virginia Senate from the Virginia's 7th Senate district district
- In office 1874–1877

Personal details
- Born: William Elam Tanner; March 13, 1836 Buckingham County, Virginia, U.S.
- Died: August 6, 1898 (aged 62) Richmond, Virginia, U.S.
- Resting place: Hollywood Cemetery, Richmond, Virginia
- Party: Democratic
- Spouse: Mary Mildred Mallory
- Children: Charles Wortham; Helen Lauren; Harriet Maxwell; William E. Mildred Lee; John Francis; Albert Snead; Walter Stuart
- Education: University of Virginia; Richmond College

Military service
- Allegiance: Confederate States of America
- Branch/service: Confederate States Army
- Years of service: 1861–1865
- Rank: Lieutenant Colonel
- Unit: 6th Virginia Infantry; 2nd Virginia Infantry
- Battles/wars: Battle of New Market Heights

William Elam Tanner (March 13, 1836, in Buckingham County, Virginia – August 6, 1898, in Richmond, Virginia) was a Virginia State Senator, a Lieutenant Colonel, and businessman.

== Early life ==
Named after his late grandfather, Tanner was born to John F. and Harriet L. Tanner, in Buckingham County. John worked with Joseph Reid Anderson and Anderson's father-in-law, Dr. Richard S. Archer, to form J. R. Anderson and Company. They produced iron for the Louisiana sugar mills. The company formed into the Tredegar Iron Works Company by 1841. John secured a job for his son at the iron company.

== Civil War ==
Tanner was employed as a bookkeeper for the Tredegar Iron Works in Richmond. Tanner was commissioned a Lieutenant in the Letcher Artillery in 1862. After his service in 6th Virginia Infantry, he was promoted to Lieutenant Colonel in the 2nd Virginia Infantry. On September 29–30, 1864, Tanner fought at Battle of New Market Heights as part of the Siege of Petersburg.

== Tanner and Delaney ==
Col. W. E. Tanner was the head and manager of iron manufacturer companies. He dedicated his life to the iron works field. In 1867, Tanner & Delaney was founded at the junction of Canal Street and Seventh street. It was said that every Virginian had a pride for Richmond. Tanner used the Second Industrial Revolution to recover the war-torn city. They relocated on twelve acres of land on the Chesapeake and Ohio Railway. Tanner & Delaney became one of the largest and well-equipped American Engine-works. The company was in the form of a hollow square with three sides accompanied with running water, lakes, shrubbery, and flowers. The summit of a one-hundred foot tower contained a tank of 25,000 gallons of water. A waterhose was available to put out flames. The brick buildings were of a stylish design. The "Staunton Spectator" claimed that the secret behind the success of Tanner and Delaney was Tanner's "talents, sagacity, and fine business qualifications." It was said that his traits were showcased in all aspects of the bold and successful enterprise. The newspaper closed with, "Richmond may well be proud of such a son." A factory was set up in the Shockoe Warehouse on 13th Street in 1868, in the building formerly occupied by sword manufacturers, Edwin Boyle and Thomas Gamble. The manufacturer was prepared to manufacture and supply at short notice, and of high quality, sash, blinds, doors, and moldings of every pattern.

== Virginia State Senate ==
As the Reconstruction Era dwindled, Radical Republicans, carpetbaggers, and ex-War Democrats lost their influence to Southern Democrats. Tanner managed to become an alderman by 1874. Tanner and Bradley Tyler Johnson ran for the historic 7th Senate District (Richmond and Henrico) in 1875. Both men were critics of the postwar policies; however, they still attempted to gain the vote of African-American Republicans. Johnson and Tanner gained support with white Redeemers and initially the Readjuster Party. It appeared that the Democrats would win the black vote. Two Independents, however, wanted to retain the postwar policies. William Carter Knight and Patrick Henry Starke declared their candidacy on the Sunday before Election Day. Knight and Starke were essentially Republicans. They could not call themselves "Republicans" and win white ex-Confederates. Johnson organized campaign groups of African-Americans "at very considerable expense." These were nicknamed "Johnson clubs." After the Democrats lost the black vote, they claimed their opponents engaged in electoral fraud. Knight and Starke supporters allegedly paid $15 to $50 to African-American voters. All African-Americans abandoned Tanner and Johnson to vote for Knight and Starke. The Democrats still defeated the Independent candidates.

As Senator, Tanner visited Washington, D.C. in February, 1876. He attended the seventh annual ball of Columbia Commandery with the Knights Templar. Tanner was disgraced in 1878 after his prosecution, alongside T. C. Wilkinson and John Enders Robinson, after they unnecessarily left on their waterhose at their residence.

== Contribution to the arts ==
In 1879, Tanner and his wife traveled from Richmond to see the Handel and Haydn Society in Boston. Tanner was referred as "one of our most critical lovers of good music." He bought a Knabe full concert grand piano with the finishings from Ramos and Moses.

== Freemasonry ==
Tanner's association with freemasonry dated back at least to the Civil War. When the Union Army reached an abandoned and burning Richmond in 1865, the city was conquered by looters, vandals, and mobsters. Mason's Hall was threatened with destruction by the angry mobs. An unnamed colonel and Fraternity member found emblems over the door of the hall. He halted his army in order to save the hall from the criminals. Tanner, Past Master of No. 10, was ordered to gather a meeting at the Lodge. The general and their Masonic comrades gathered. Tanner persuaded the Unionists agreed to assist widows and orphans of Confederate Masons. The mob violence decreased, and Tanner was credited as the peacemaker between the opposing parties.

Tanner became prominently associated with the Masonic organizations of Richmond. He most closely aligned himself with the Grand Bodies of the State. Tanner's masonic connections were spread nationally, particularly in Providence and Boston.

== Education ==
Tanner became an advocate for higher education. In 1883, the University of Virginia introduced the Tanner medal. The medal was awarded by Greek language professors to their best graduate students. Tanner donated $250 to the university to yield $15 a year. He dedicated the medal to his late parents, whom both died earlier in the decade. The Tanner medal was in the shape of a Grecian helmet inscribed with the figure of Athena presenting a crown and the legend. Tanner corresponded with William B. Taliaferro late in the year. Taliaferro similarly was a war veteran whom joined the board of the College of William and Mary and the Virginia Military Institute. By 1884, Tanner secured a position as a trustee at Richmond College (Virginia).

== Richmond Locomotive Works ==
Tanner also founded the Richmond Locomotive Works in 1887. Tanner's company grew from Tredegar Iron Works to advance to a well-known manufacturer of steam locomotive engines. Tanner had been appointed special agent for the Tredegar company in early 1887. He used his new position to embark on his new company. His decision to start the locomotive works brought Richmond out of her tumultuous past.

== Minnesota Car Company ==
In 1888, Tanner moved from Richmond to New York City for business in the railroad supply business. He did not stay a year in New York. Tanner moved to Duluth to work at the Minnesota Iron-Car Company. J. F. S. Anderson was president of the Minnesota Car Company; G. H. White was the superintendent and Tanner was the Vice President. Tanner purchased 2,000 tons of iron in St. Paul and Minneapolis in October, 1888.

== The Burton Electric Company ==
Tanner was in Duluth, but his interests remained in Richmond. By 1888, Tanner was President of The Burton Electric Company. The company pioneered commodities, such as electric light, electric heating, and electric power. The Duluth Evening Herald noted that Tanner's electric company had effectively invented such heating for the railroad car. The company had even demonstrated their product on the Richmond cars. The company would conduct further and more exhaustive tests on the cars of the Northwest. Eickemeyer dynamo will be located in the baggage car and be driven by an engine with steam from the boiler of the locomotive. This operation was conducted on Pullman vestibule trains for one-third of a year. The acquisition of the appropriate current heaters is claimed to be solved. The dynamo to be will have such a capacity that there will be a surplus of current.

== Later life ==
Tanner was not completely comfortable in Michigan. He was a man of the South and longed to return to his old state. In November, 1889, Col. Tanner visited Richmond and other Eastern cities.

Tanner returned to Richmond in 1892 to participate in the unveiling of the A. P. Hill monument in the Hermitage Road Historic District. It was said that he was one of many aids who wore red sashes. He marched with Virginian veterans, such as Henry Heth and William Henry Palmer.

== Personal life ==
Tanner married Mary Mildred Mallory. They had their first son, Charles Wortham, in 1858. Their first daughter, Helen Lauren, was born in 1862. Tanner's next child, Harriet Maxwell, was born in 1866. They had another child, William E., in 1868. Tanner's next child, Mildred Lee, was born in 1870. He had another son, John Francis, in 1871. Tanner's next son, Albert Snead, was born in 1874. His final child, Walter Stuart, was born in 1877. Mary Mildred died in 1892.

== Death ==
Tanner suddenly died on August 6, 1898. He was laid to rest in a family burial plot at Hollywood Cemetery in Richmond. It was inscribed in his tombstone, "He has moved a little nearer to the master of all music!"
