= Edwin P. Cox =

American politician (1870–1938)

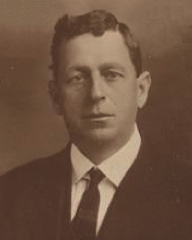
- Portrait of Cox, 1914

41st Speaker of the Virginia House of Delegates
- In office January 14, 1914 – January 12, 1916
- Preceded by: Richard E. Byrd
- Succeeded by: Harry R. Houston

Member of the Virginia House of Delegates from Richmond City
- In office January 13, 1904 – January 12, 1916
- Preceded by: Arthur C. Harman
- Succeeded by: James H. Price

Personal details
- Born: Edwin Piper Cox; May 2, 1870
- Died: March 11, 1938 (aged 67) Richmond, Virginia, U.S.
- Party: Democratic
- Spouses: Sallie Bland Clarke (m. 1898; died 1906); Rhoda Ethel Freeman (m. 1912)
- Children: 4, including Bland and Edwin
- Education: Hampden–Sydney College (BA); University of Virginia (LLB)
- Occupation: Lawyer; politician; judge

Edwin Piper Cox (May 2, 1870 – March 11, 1938) was a Virginia politician. He represented Richmond in the Virginia House of Delegates, and served as the body's Speaker from 1914 until 1916. he died in Richmond Virginia in 1938
