= Elben C. Folkes =

American lawyer and politician

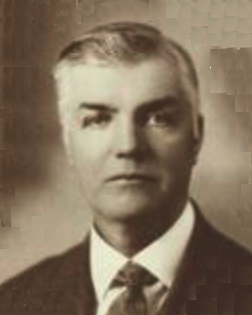

Member of the Virginia House of Delegates from Richmond City
- In office January 13, 1926 – January 10, 1934
- Preceded by: James R. Sheppard Jr.
- Succeeded by: Albert O. Boschen
- In office December 1, 1897 – January 13, 1904
- Preceded by: Julian Bryant
- Succeeded by: Charles M. Wallace Jr.

Member of the Virginia Senate from the 38th district
- In office January 8, 1908 – November 1912 Serving with Arthur C. Harman
- Preceded by: Charles J. Anderson
- Succeeded by: James E. Cannon

Personal details
- Born: Elben Clive Folkes; April 4, 1873 Richmond, Virginia, U.S.
- Died: November 8, 1950 (aged 77) Richmond, Virginia, U.S.
- Party: Democratic
- Spouse: Mary Lou Catlett
- Education: Richmond College

Elben Clive Folkes (April 4, 1873 – November 8, 1950) was an American lawyer and politician who served in both houses of the Virginia General Assembly.
