= Julien Gunn =

American lawyer and politician (1877–1948)

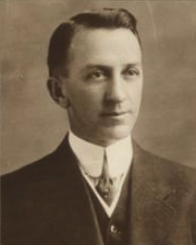

United States Attorney for the Eastern District of Virginia
- In office November 4, 1920 – May 5, 1921
- Appointed by: Woodrow Wilson
- Preceded by: D. Lawrence Groner
- Succeeded by: D. Lawrence Groner

Member of the Virginia Senate from the 35th district
- In office January 12, 1916 – January 11, 1928
- Preceded by: Louis O. Wendenburg
- Succeeded by: John B. Watkins

Member of the Virginia House of Delegates from Henrico County
- In office January 14, 1914 – January 12, 1916
- Preceded by: Charles W. Throckmorton
- Succeeded by: Harry C. Beattie

Personal details
- Born: July 1, 1877 Cumberland, Virginia, U.S.
- Died: February 1, 1948 (aged 70) Richmond, Virginia, U.S.
- Party: Democratic
- Spouse: Teresa Louise Clarke
- Education: Richmond College; University of Virginia

Julien Gunn (July 1, 1877 – February 1, 1948) was an American lawyer and Democratic politician who served as a member of the Virginia Senate and Virginia House of Delegates. In 1920, he was appointed by President Woodrow Wilson to be United States Attorney for the Eastern District of Virginia.

Virginia House of Delegates
Preceded by Charles W. Throckmorton	Virginia Delegate for Henrico County; 1914–1916	Succeeded by Harry C. Beattie
Senate of Virginia
Preceded by Louis O. Wendenburg	Virginia Senator for the 35th District; 1916–1928	Succeeded by John B. Watkins
Legal offices
Preceded by D. Lawrence Groner	United States Attorney for the Eastern District of Virginia; 1920–1921	Succeeded by D. Lawrence Groner
