= James E. Cannon =

American politician (1873–1942)

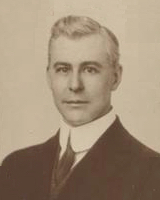

Member of the Virginia Senate from the 38th district
- In office January 14, 1914 – March 29, 1923 Serving with Arthur C. Harman (1914–1916); Louis O. Wendenburg (1916–1920); Morgan R. Mills (1920–1923)
- Preceded by: Elben C. Folkes
- Succeeded by: T. Gray Haddon

Personal details
- Born: James Edmundson Cannon; August 11, 1873 Richmond, Virginia, U.S.
- Died: August 3, 1942 (aged 68) Richmond, Virginia, U.S.
- Resting place: Hollywood Cemetery
- Party: Democratic
- Spouse: Virginia Bernard Harvie
- Education: University of Virginia (LL.B.)

James Edmundson Cannon (August 11, 1873 – August 3, 1942) was an American Democratic politician who represented the City of Richmond in the Virginia Senate. He was buried at Hollywood Cemetery in Richmond.

He resigned following the 1923 special session of the General Assembly to accept appointment as the city attorney for Richmond, a position he held until 1938.

Senate of Virginia
Preceded by Elben C. Folkes	Virginia Senator for the 38th District; 1914–1923; Served alongside: Arthur C. Harman, Louis O. Wendenburg, Morgan R. Mills	Succeeded by T. Gray Haddon
