= Edwin Cox (chemist) =

American chemist, military officer, and civic leader (1902–1977)

- Born: September 20, 1902; Richmond, Virginia, U.S.
- Died: February 22, 1977 (aged 74); Richmond, Virginia, U.S.
- Burial place: Hollywood Cemetery
- Education: Virginia Military Institute (BS, MS)
- Occupations: Chemist; farmer
- Political party: Democratic
- Spouse: Virginia DeMott
- Father: Edwin P. Cox
- Relatives: Bland Cox Bruns (sister)

Edwin Cox (September 20, 1902 – February 22, 1977) was an American chemist, military officer, and civic leader. In 1965, he was awarded the American Institute of Chemists Gold Medal. He was buried in Hollywood Cemetery.

Awards and achievements
Preceded by Roger Adams	Recipient of the American Institute of Chemists Gold Medal; 1965	Succeeded by John H. Nair
Non-profit organization positions
Preceded by Virginius Dabney	President of the Virginia Historical Society; 1972–1975	Succeeded by Joseph Clarke Robert
