= Virginia Keane Bryce =

American artist (1861–1935)

- Born: Virginia Keane; July 6, 1861; Richmond, Virginia, C.S.
- Died: September 13, 1935 (aged 74); Richmond, Virginia, U.S.
- Resting place: Hollywood Cemetery
- Occupation: Artist
- Spouse: Clarence Archibald Bryce (m. 1885)
- Children: 5

Virginia Keane Bryce (July 6, 1861 – September 13, 1935) was an American portrait painter from Virginia.

== Life and career ==
Virginia Keane Bryce was born on July 6, 1861 in Richmond, Virginia, during the American Civil War. She was the daughter of Hugh Payne Keane, the son of a sugar planter and slave owner on St. Vincent, and Jeannette Gradé, a French woman he met in New York.

In 1874, she began studying at the Ecolé Balleroy, a finishing school in Paris. She studied art under the painter Jean-Léon Gérôme until she returned to Richmond in 1878. In Richmond, she taught art students and painted portraits.

In 1881, her portrait of President James Monroe, a copy of James Bogle's copy of the portrait by Gilbert Stuart, was hung in the Virginia State Capitol.

In 1885, she married Dr. Clarence Archibald Bryce, whom she met when he set her mother's broken arm. They had four daughters and one son, C. P. Jr., Mildred, Virginia, Jeanette and Mrs. F. P. Pavay. Her son was killed in World War I. She painted a portrait of her husband, now owned by the Virginia Historical Society, called Charity Patient, in which he tends to an elderly African-American female patient. Carrie Meitzner Akard writes that the painting embodies the "paternalistic devotion towards former slaves that many whites like to glorify" following the Civil War.

Virginia Keane Bryce died on September 13, 1935, at her home in Richmond. She was buried in Hollywood Cemetery.
