= John Fulmer Bright =

American politician and physician (1877–1953)

55th Mayor of Richmond, Virginia
- In office 1924–1940
- Preceded by: George Ainslie
- Succeeded by: Gordon Barbour Ambler

Member of the Virginia House of Delegates from Richmond City
- In office January 11, 1922 – January 9, 1924
- Preceded by: Albert O. Boschen
- Succeeded by: Albert O. Boschen

Personal details
- Born: November 17, 1877 Richmond, Virginia, U.S.
- Died: December 29, 1953 (aged 76) Richmond, Virginia, U.S.
- Resting place: Hollywood Cemetery
- Party: Democratic
- Education: Medical College of Virginia (MD)

Military service
- Allegiance: United States
- Branch/service: United States Army
- Years of service: 1907–1941
- Rank: Brigadier general
- Battles/wars: World War I World War II

John Fulmer Bright (November 17, 1877 – December 29, 1953) was an American politician and physician from Virginia. He served as a member of the Virginia House of Delegates. He served as mayor of Richmond, Virginia, from 1924 to 1940.

== Early life ==
J. Fulmer Bright was born in Richmond, Virginia, to Mary Samuel (née Davis) and George Hilliard Bright. He attended public schools in Richmond and graduated from the Medical College of Virginia with a Doctor of Medicine in 1898.

== Career ==
Bright practiced medicine for 24 years. He was a professor of anatomy at the Medical College of Virginia. He was professor emeritus of anatomy at the time of his death. In 1907, Bright entered the National Guard. He was commanding officer of the 1st Virginia Infantry from 1921 to 1940. He retired in 1941 as a brigadier general.

Bright was a Democrat. He was elected to the Virginia House of Delegates in 1922. In 1924, he ran for mayor of Richmond on the platform of "good government for less money or better government for the same money". He served as mayor of Richmond from 1924 to 1940. He ran again in 1940, but lost to Gordon Barbour Ambler. During the Great Depression, he initially rejected state and federal grants to support Richmond. In 1939, he opposed a proposal to set up a federal housing authority after a resolution that city council had passed to include a slum clearance project. He called the project "unsound, unbusinesslike, undemocratic, unAmerican and wrong in principle". He also opposed proposals to change the city's two chamber legislative body to a unicameral council by the Richmond Citizens' Association. In 1948, a new city charter weakened the mayor's power by implementing a city manager system and replaced the bicameral city council with a single nine-person body whose members were elected at large. He described the change as "Richmond's greatest tragedy". During his tenure, he oversaw the building of the Robert E. Lee Memorial Bridge with Reconstruction Finance Corporation funds and the replacement of the Marshall, Fifth and First viaducts. The World War Memorial Carillon was also built in Byrd Park. He ran again for the Virginia House of Delegates in 1941, but lost.

In 1941, Bright became an assistant co-coordinator of the State Defense Council. In 1942, he became state director of the Office of Price Administration. In 1950, he became medical advisor to the State Industrial Commission. He held that role until his death. In 1950 and 1951, he led referendum drives to defeat city council supported efforts to build an expressway. He later agreed the toll road was the proper approach to handling the traffic problem in Richmond.

== Personal life ==
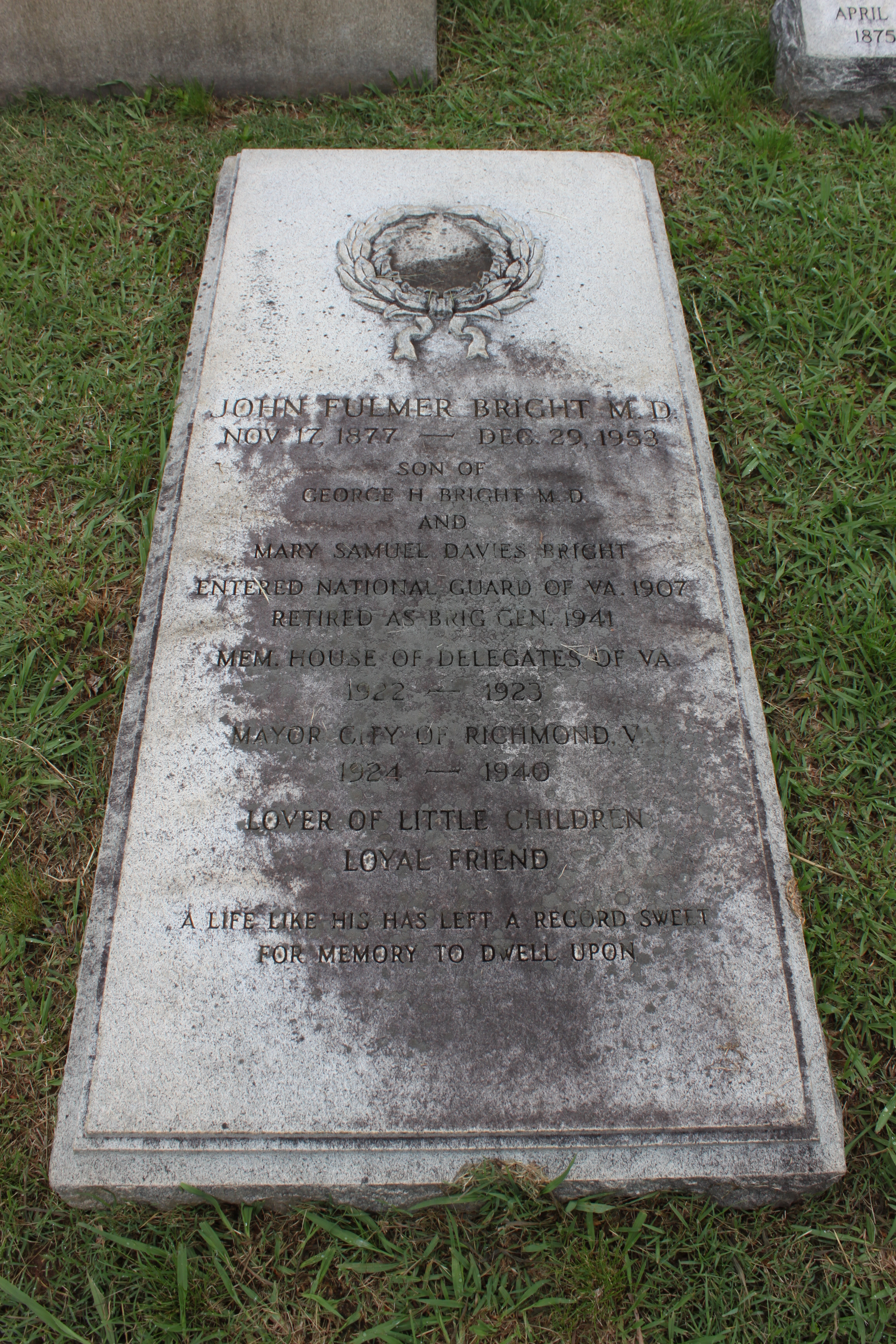
Grave of Bright at Hollywood Cemetery

Bright lived at 408 West Grace Street in Richmond. He was hospitalized for a heart ailment in November and on December 26, 1953. He died of a heart attack a few days later on December 29. He was buried in Hollywood Cemetery.

== See also ==
- List of mayors of Richmond, Virginia

== Sources ==
- Robert C. Glass and Carter Glass Jr., Virginia Democracy (1937), 3:108–109.
- John T. Kneebone et al., eds., Dictionary of Virginia Biography (1998- ), 2:231-233. ISBN 0-88490-199-8
- Christopher Silver, Twentieth-Century Richmond: Planning, Politics, and Race (1984), 90–93, 130–131, 146–150, 176–181, 188–189.
