= Albert O. Boschen =

American politician (1873–1957)

Member of the Virginia House of Delegates from Richmond City
- In office January 10, 1934 – January 13, 1954
- Preceded by: Elben C. Folkes
- Succeeded by: George E. Allen Jr.
- In office January 9, 1924 – January 11, 1928
- Preceded by: J. Fulmer Bright
- Succeeded by: S. S. P. Patteson
- In office January 9, 1918 – January 11, 1922
- Preceded by: Graham B. Hobson
- Succeeded by: J. Fulmer Bright

Personal details
- Born: Albert Orlando Boschen; June 25, 1873 Richmond, Virginia, U.S.
- Died: August 15, 1957 (aged 84) Richmond, Virginia, U.S.
- Resting place: Hollywood Cemetery
- Party: Democratic
- Spouse: Ivy Longworth
- Education: Richmond College; T. C. Williams School of Law

Albert Orlando Boschen (June 25, 1873 – August 15, 1957) was an American politician who served in the Virginia House of Delegates.

== Early life ==
Albert Orlando Boschen was born on June 25, 1873, in Richmond, Virginia. He was educated at Benedictine High School and the University of Richmond. After working in his father's shoe business, he enrolled in the T. C. Williams School of Law, after which he began a law practice in 1898.

== Career ==
Boschen first ventured into politics in 1900 as a member of the Democratic Committee in Richmond. He served in the Virginia House of Delegates. He was chairman of the committee of asylums and prisons and of the appropriations committee. He was a member of the claims, agricultural and enrollment committees.

Boschen acted with a stock theater company and in amateur dramatic productions. He also directed the Virginia Historical Pageant and Samis Grotto.

== Personal life ==
Boschen had two daughters, Isabelle M. and Virginia. He died on August 15, 1957, at his home in Richmond. He was buried in Hollywood Cemetery.
