= Emma Guffey Miller =

American feminist and Democratic Party official (1874–1970)

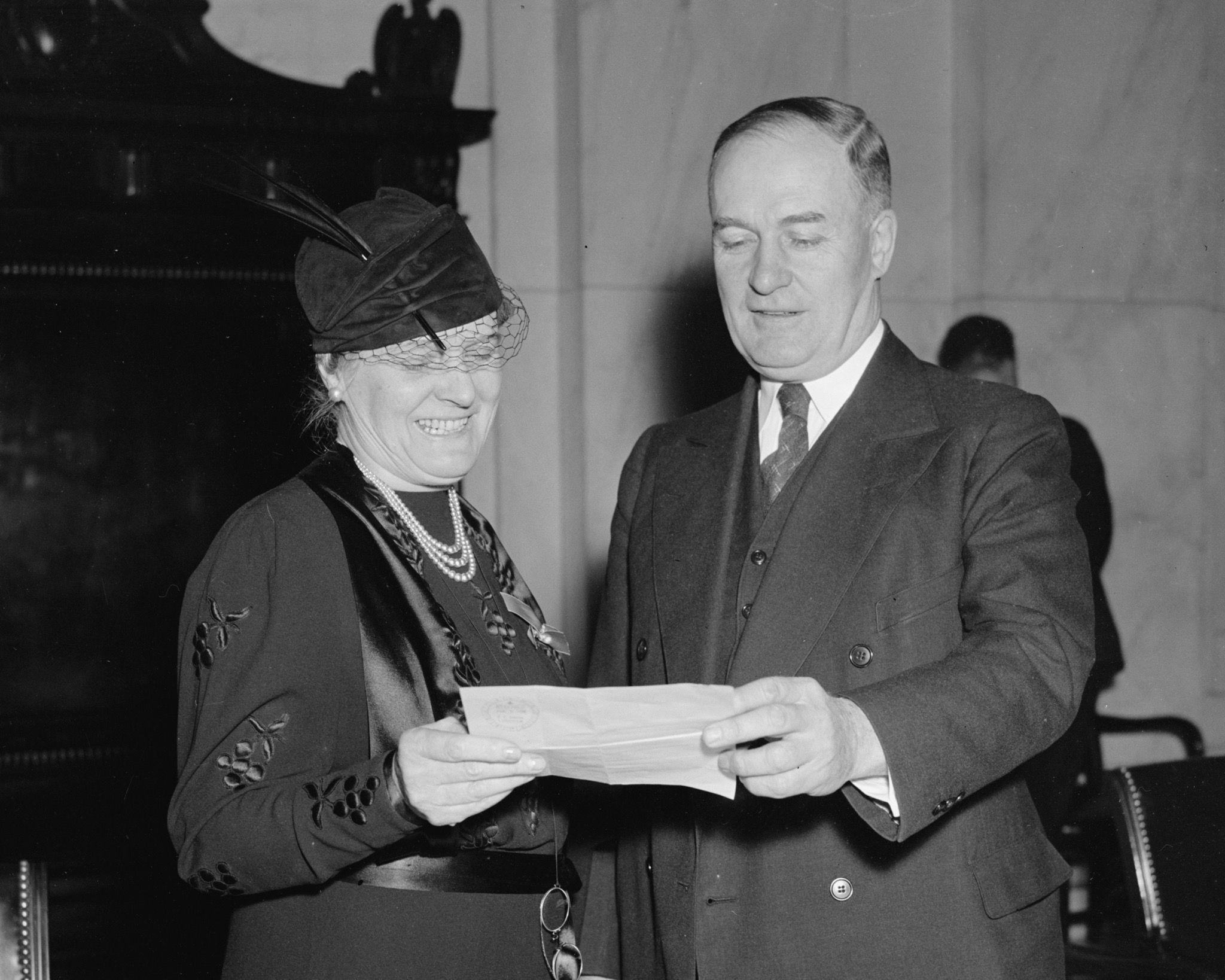
- Emma Guffey Miller and Senator Edward R. Burke, author of an Equal Rights Amendment
- Born: Mary Emma Guffey; July 6, 1874; Guffey Station, Westmoreland County, Pennsylvania, U.S.
- Died: July 6, 1970 (aged 96); Grove City, Pennsylvania, U.S.
- Resting place: Hollywood Cemetery
- Spouse: Carroll Miller
- Children: 4

Emma Guffey Miller (July 6, 1874 – February 23, 1970) was an American feminist activist and long-time Democratic Party official. She was a major proponent of an Equal Rights Amendment for women.

== Early life ==
Miller was born Mary Emma Guffey on July 6, 1874, at Guffey Station, Westmoreland County, Pennsylvania, to John Guffey (a businessman who worked in oil, gas, and coal) and Barbaretta (Hough) Guffey. She had one brother, Joseph Guffey, who became a US senator. Miller attended Bryn Mawr College, graduating in 1899. She taught for three years before meeting Carroll Miller on a trip to Japan, where he was then working. Carroll Miller worked as an engineer, business executive, and government official. They married on October 28, 1902, and continued to live in Japan for five years, part of which time she taught. They had four children: William Gardner III (born 1905), twins John and Carroll Jr. (born 1908), and Joseph (born 1912).

== Public life ==
Miller was a supporter of the women's suffrage movement and in the 1920s was one of the organizers who brought Democratic women's clubs together into the Pennsylvania Federation of Democratic Women. From 1921 to 1925 she was a member of the Pennsylvania board of League of Women Voters, but a dedicated Democrat, she resigned over the group's insistence on nonpartisanship. She also actively supported the repeal of Prohibition as well as US Presidents Franklin D. Roosevelt and Harry S. Truman.

Miller was a delegate to every Democratic national convention beginning in 1924, when she became the first woman to receive votes for a Presidential nomination, until her death more than half a century later. She also became a member of the Democratic National Committee in 1930.

== Involvement with National Woman's Party ==
Miller was a member of the National Woman's Party and became chair in 1960. In this capacity she worked for an Equal Rights Amendment (ERA) to the Constitution, insisting that suffrage was only a half-measure and failed to put women on an equal basis with men in the business sphere. She said: "We are out of the idiot class, but still in the children's class." In 1938, she testified before the Senate Judiciary Committee in support of the ERA proposed by Senator Burke and in 1943 she persuaded the Democratic Party to include the ERA in the party platform. Historian Rebecca DeWolf has classified Miller as an emancipationist who believed in equality for women.

== Personal life ==
Miller's husband died in 1949. Miller died of a heart attack on February 23, 1970, in Grove City, Pennsylvania. Then aged 95, Miller was the oldest member of the Democratic National Committee. She was buried in Hollywood Cemetery.
