= Bland Cox Bruns =

American politician (1901–1985)

Bland Bruns

Member of the Louisiana House of Representatives from Orleans Parish's 10th Ward
- In office 1950–1956
- Preceded by: George Corcoran
- Succeeded by: Nicholas Lapara

Personal details
- Born: Ellen Bland Cox; January 3, 1901 Richmond, Virginia, U.S.
- Died: October 1, 1985 (aged 84) Charlottesville, Virginia, U.S.
- Resting place: Hollywood Cemetery
- Political party: Democratic
- Spouse: Thomas Muldrup Logan Bruns (m. 1925; died 1976)
- Parent: Edwin P. Cox (father)
- Relatives: Edwin Cox (brother)

Ellen Bland Cox Bruns (January 3, 1901 – October 1, 1985) was an American politician who served in the Louisiana House of Representatives, as the third woman elected to that body. A Richmond, Virginia native, she was the daughter of Edwin P. Cox, the speaker of the Virginia House of Delegates from 1914 to 1916. She was buried in Hollywood Cemetery.

Louisiana House of Representatives
Preceded by George Corcoran	Member of the Louisiana House of Representatives from Orleans Parish's 10th Ward; 1950–1956	Succeeded by Nicholas Lapara
