= Carroll Miller =

American politician (1875–1949)

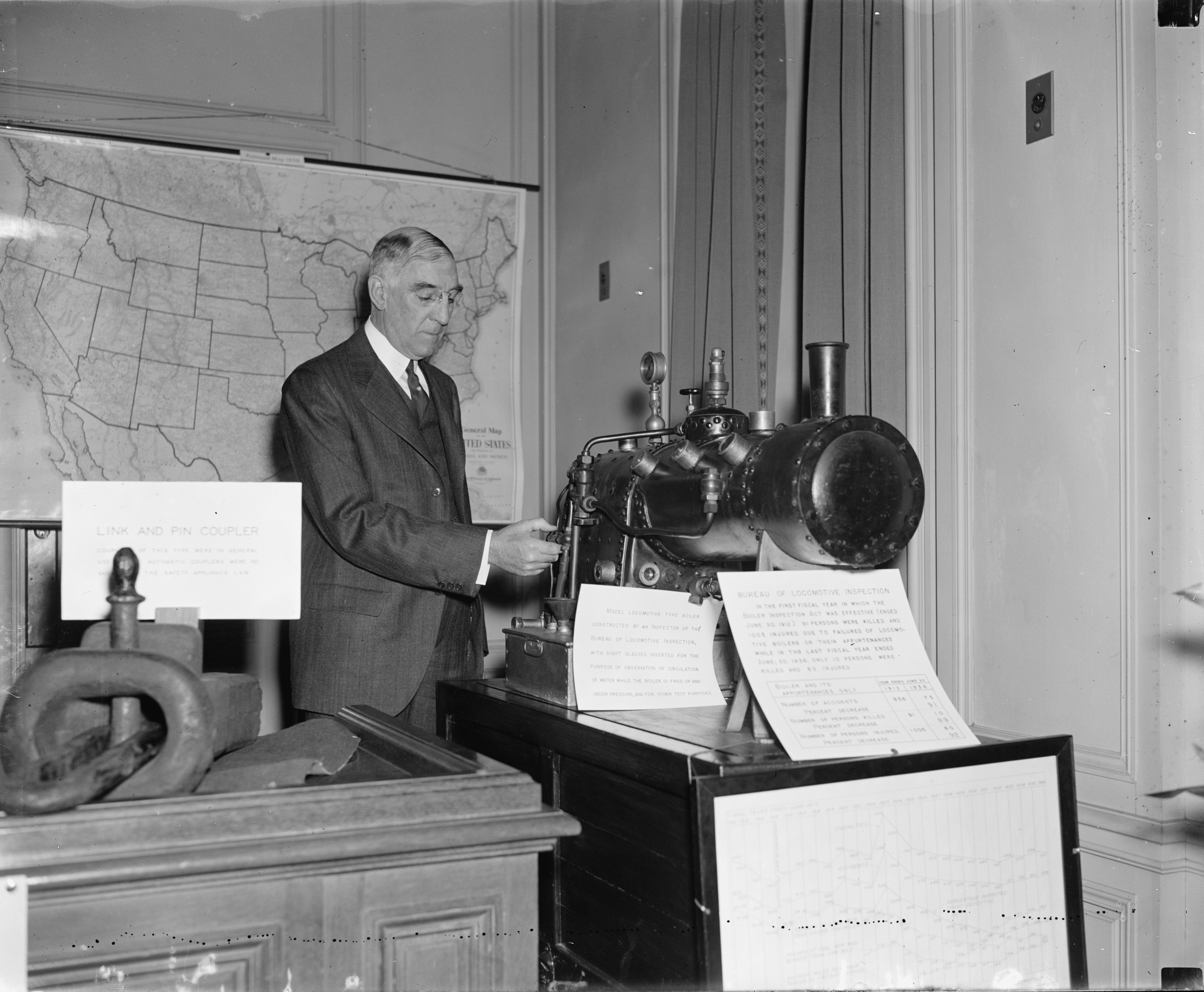
- Miller in 1937
- Born: March 18, 1875; Richmond, Virginia, U.S.
- Died: December 24, 1949 (aged 74); Washington, D.C., U.S.
- Resting place: Hollywood Cemetery
- Education: Richmond College; Stevens Institute of Technology (ME)
- Occupations: Engineer; politician
- Spouse: Mary Emma Guffey
- Children: 4

Carroll Miller (March 18, 1875 – December 24, 1949) was an American politician from Virginia. He was chairman of the Interstate Commerce Commission in 1936.

== Early life ==
Carroll Miller was born on March 18, 1875, in Richmond, Virginia, to Emma (née Wiglesworth) and William G. Miller. His father was a tobacconist and a member of the Confederate Army. He attended private schools and Richmond College. He graduated from Stevens Institute of Technology with a Master of Engineering.

== Career ==
Miller was a consulting gas engineer for utilities companies. He was president of the Thermatomic Carbon Company. He was appointed a member of the Interstate Commerce Commission by President Theodore Roosevelt in 1933. This appointment might have been based on a recommendation by the president's political ally Senator Joseph F. Guffey of Pennsylvania, the brother-in-law of Carroll Miller, as he had practically no knowledge of railroads and railroad employees. He was serious and hard-working and became Chairman of Interstate Commerce Commission on 29 December 1936. He served on the commission for three seven-year terms. He remained in the role until his death.

== Personal life ==
Miller married Mary Emma Guffey. They had four sons, William G., Carroll Jr., John G. and Joseph G.

Miller died on December 24, 1949, in Washington, D.C. He was buried in Hollywood Cemetery.
