= George Ainslie (Virginia politician) =

American politician (1868–1931)

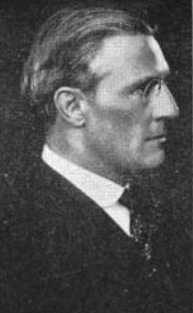

54th Mayor of Richmond, Virginia
- In office September 4, 1912 – 1924
- Preceded by: David C. Richardson
- Succeeded by: John Fulmer Bright

Personal details
- Born: George A. Ainslie; October 10, 1868 Richmond, Virginia, U.S.
- Died: July 18, 1931 (aged 62) Richmond, Virginia, U.S.
- Resting place: Hollywood Cemetery; Richmond, Virginia, U.S.
- Party: Democratic
- Education: Virginia Military Institute; University of Virginia

George Ainslie (October 10, 1868 – July 18, 1931) was the mayor of Richmond, Virginia, from 1912 until 1924. He was of English ancestry, all of which had been in Virginia since the 17th century.

== Education ==
Ainslie received a B.S. at Virginia Military Institute in 1890 and an L.L.B. at the University of Virginia in 1893.

== Mayor of Richmond ==
During Ainslie's administration, annexation nearly doubled Richmond's size. As a result of this expansion, Ainslie pursued an ambitious program of public improvements, including completion of a new waterworks and creation of a fully motorized fire department. He also advocated amendments to the Richmond city charter that in 1919 strengthened the power of the mayor's office. The Richmond newspapers often featured photographs of Ainslie greeting visiting dignitaries, including Marshal Ferdinand Foch (1921) and former British prime minister David Lloyd George (1923).

Ainslie lost the April 1924 primary to his ultimate successor, John Fulmer Bright, after Bright accused Ainslie of being a big spender who had placed the city in debt by borrowing money for public improvements.

After leaving office, Ainslie worked as an insurance agent. He was buried in Hollywood Cemetery.
