= Louis O. Wendenburg =

American politician

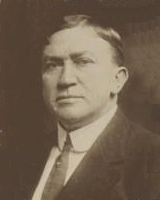

Member of the Virginia Senate from the 38th district
- In office January 12, 1916 – January 14, 1920 Serving with James E. Cannon
- Preceded by: Arthur C. Harman
- Succeeded by: Morgan R. Mills

Member of the Virginia Senate from the 35th district
- In office January 10, 1912 – January 12, 1916
- Preceded by: T. Ashby Wickham
- Succeeded by: Julien Gunn

Personal details
- Born: Louis Otto Wendenburg; January 21, 1861 Richmond, Virginia, U.S.
- Died: July 17, 1934 (aged 73) Richmond, Virginia, U.S.
- Party: Democratic
- Education: University of Virginia (LLB)

Louis Otto Wendenburg (January 21, 1861 – July 17, 1934) was an American lawyer and Democratic politician who served as a member of the Virginia Senate, representing the state's 35th district.

Wendenburg is buried at Hollywood Cemetery, Section C, Lot 25, Richmond, Virginia.

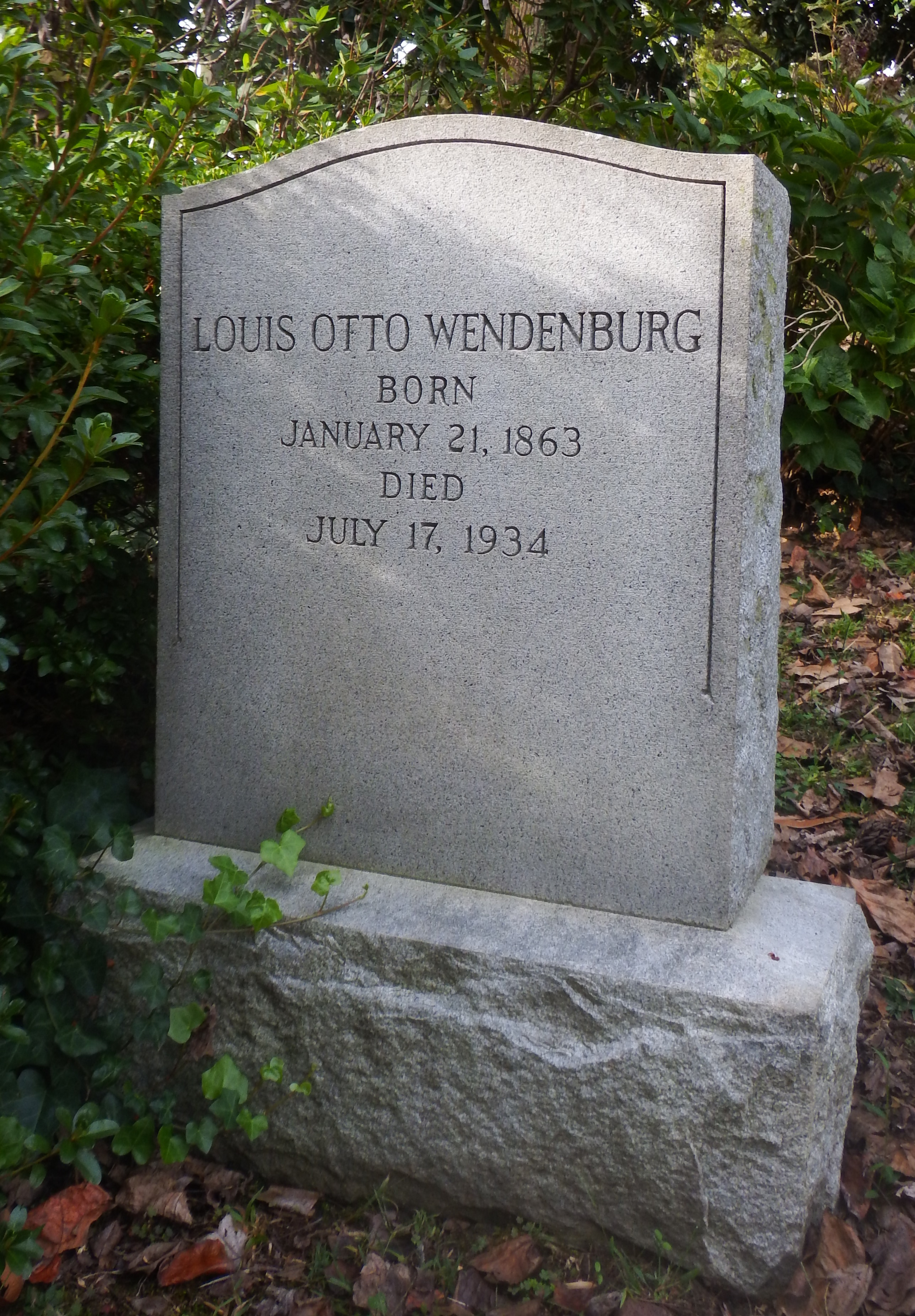
Louis Otto Wendenburg's grave marker

Senate of Virginia
Preceded by T. Ashby Wickham	Virginia Senator for the 35th District; 1912–1916	Succeeded by Julien Gunn
Preceded by Arthur C. Harman	Virginia Senator for the 38th District; 1916–1920; Served alongside: James E. Cannon	Succeeded by Morgan R. Mills
