= Arthur C. Harman =

American politician

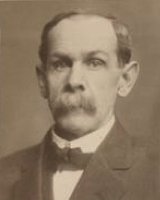

Member of the Virginia Senate from the 38th district
- In office January 13, 1904 – January 12, 1916 Serving with George Wayne Anderson; Elben C. Folkes
- Preceded by: D. Gardiner Tyler
- Succeeded by: Louis O. Wendenburg

Member of the Virginia House of Delegates from Richmond City
- In office December 4, 1901 – January 12, 1904 Serving with L.T. Christian, Elben C. Folkes, S.L. Kelley, Charles M. Wallace, Jr.
- Preceded by: John E. Epps
- Succeeded by: Edwin P. Cox

Personal details
- Born: Arthur C. Harman; March 6, 1854 Staunton, Virginia, U.S.
- Died: June 15, 1927 (aged 73) Richmond, Virginia, U.S.
- Party: Democratic
- Spouse: Rachel Primrose Cochran
- Education: Virginia Military Institute

Arthur C. Harman (March 6, 1854 – June 15, 1927) was an American businessman and Democratic politician who served in both houses of the Virginia General Assembly, representing the state capital of Richmond.

== Early and family life ==
Born in Staunton, Virginia to then-Commonwealth's attorney (prosecutor) William Henry Harman and his wife, the former Margaret Susan Garber. His family had a tradition of military service, from his great-great-grandfathers John Cunningham and George Moffett during the American Revolutionary War. His father served in the Virginia militia and U.S. Army during the Mexican-American War. During the American Civil War, his father became an officer in the Virginia militia and Confederate States Army, helped to seize the Harpers Ferry arsenal and later died at the Battle of Waynesboro. Three uncles also served as Confederate officers, two under CSA General Stonewall Jackson; his uncle CSA Lt. L.T. Harman died of typhoid fever in the conflict. His other uncles became prominent in rebuilding Virginia's railroads. Harman would graduate from the Virginia Military Institute in 1874.

In 1891, Harman married Rachel Primrose Cochran, also of Staunton, and they had a daughter.

== Career ==
The Harmans made Richmond their home, where A.C. Harman had a career in real estate. He also become president of the board of directors of the Virginia Penitentiary.

Following the adoption of the Virginia Constitution of 1901 by the General Assembly without a referendum, Harman ran as a Democrat (and member of the Martin organization, later the Byrd Organization) to represent the City of Richmond in the Virginia House of Delegates. He won one of five seats allocated to the city, as one of three new delegates, veterans Elben C. Folkes and S.L. Kelley winning re-election. In 1903, voters elected Harman and George Wayne Anderson as the City of Richmond's two part-time representatives in the Virginia Senate (and five different men to represent them in the House of Delegates). Elben C. Folkes would replace Anderson as the other Richmond state senator in 1908, then James E. Cannon replaced Folkes in 1914. By 1922, senators elected their former fellow Harman to be their sergeant at arms.

== Death ==
Arthur C. Harman died on June 15, 1927.

Virginia House of Delegates
Preceded by John E. Epps	Virginia Delegate for Richmond City; 1901–1904; Served alongside: L. T. Christian, Elben C. Folkes, S. L. Kelley, Charles M. Wallace, Jr.	Succeeded by Edwin P. Cox
Senate of Virginia
Preceded by John A. Lesner	Virginia Senator for the 38th District; 1904–1916; Served alongside: George Wayne Anderson, Elben C. Folkes, James E. Cannon	Succeeded by Louis O. Wendenburg
