= William Henry Palmer =

Confederate Army officer (1835–1926)

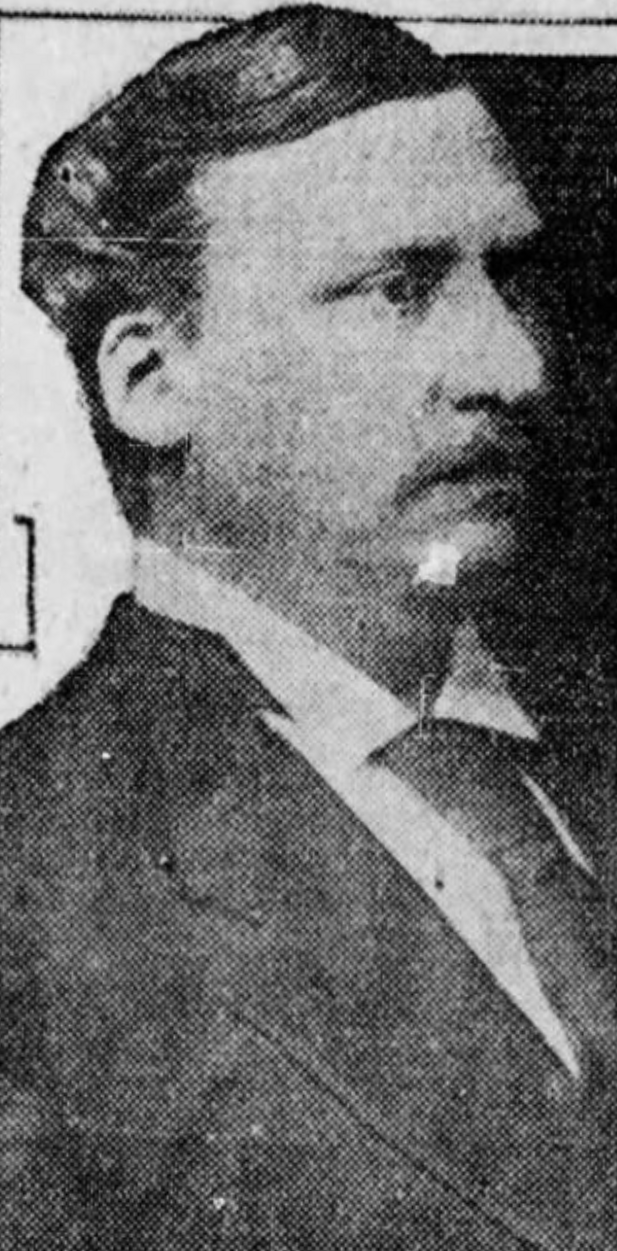
- Palmer in a 1926 newspaper
- Born: October 9, 1835; Church Hill, Richmond, Virginia, U.S.
- Died: July 14, 1926 (aged 90); Richmond, Virginia, U.S.
- Burial place: Hollywood Cemetery
- Spouse: Elizabeth Amiss (m. 1856)
- Children: 6
- Military career
- Allegiance: Confederate States of America
- Branch: Confederate States Army
- Service years: 1861–1865
- Rank: Lieutenant Colonel
- Units: 1st Virginia Infantry Regiment; Third Corps
- Conflicts: American Civil War; Battle of Blackburn's Ford; First Battle of Bull Run; Battle of Williamsburg (WIA); Battle of Cedar Mountain; Second Battle of Bull Run; Battle of Antietam; Battle of Fredericksburg; Battle of Chancellorsville (WIA); Battle of the Wilderness; Battle of Cold Harbor; Siege of Petersburg; Battle of Appomattox Court House

William Henry Palmer (October 9, 1835 – July 14, 1926) was an officer in the Confederate States Army, serving in the Army of Northern Virginia during the American Civil War.

== Early life ==
William H. Palmer was born on October 9, 1835, in the Monte Maria Convent on 22nd and Grace Streets in Church Hill, Richmond, Virginia, to Elizabeth (née Enders) and William Palmer. His ancestors were settlers in Pennsylvania and his ancestor Jacob Ege built the Old Stone House in Richmond. His father was a Richmond banker and vice president of the Richmond and Danville Railroad Company. At the age of 15, he worked for his father and later worked on the steamship Jamestown on its coastwise service for the Old Dominion Steamship Company.

== Career ==
On April 21, 1861, Palmer enlisted as a private with Company F of the 1st Virginia Infantry Regiment in the Civil War. On May 24, 1861, he was promoted to first lieutenant and served in the Battle of Blackburn's Ford in 1861. He was present at the First Battle of Bull Run and afterward, in August 1861, he became an adjutant of the regiment. In October 1861, he was named assistant adjutant general of the first brigade in Longstreet's Division, serving under then brigadier general A. P. Hill. After Lewis B. Williams Jr. was shot at the Battle of Williamsburg in May 1862, he was given command of the First Virginia and promoted to major. He was wounded in his right arm at Williamsburg. General Robert E. Lee asked Palmer to reform the First Virginia in August 1862, and the regiment fought in the Battle of Cedar Mountain and the Second Battle of Bull Run. In October 1862, he detached from First Virginia and served as a staff officer during the Battle of Antietam and the Battle of Fredericksburg under General A. P. Hill. He spent the rest of the war with Hill, eventually rising to be the chief of staff for the Army of Northern Virginia's Third Corps. After Hill's death on April 2, 1865, Palmer served as an assistant adjutant general on General James Longstreet's staff. He was one of the officers unhorsed during the accidental shooting of Stonewall Jackson during the Battle of Chancellorsville and afterward he fell from a horse that was shot from under him, causing him to miss action for months due to an injured shoulder. In May and June 1864, he was present at the Battle of the Wilderness and the Battle of Cold Harbor. He fought around Petersburg during the Siege of Petersburg in June 1864. He was present at the Battle of Appomattox Court House and surrendered with General Lee. He was paroled at Appomattox.

Palmer was senior member of the firm Palmer, Hartsook and Company. He later organized the Southern Fertilizer Company. In 1889, he left the fertilizer company to work as a banker with the old City Bank in Richmond. He was president of the City Bank from 1890 to 1910, when it was merged with the State Bank of Virginia to become the National State and City Bank. He was then president of the new bank until 1920, when it was reorganized as the State and City Bank and Trust Company. He became chairman of the board after the merger with Planters' Bank. He was president of the Virginia Fire and Mutual Insurance Company. He was a member of the executive committee of the Virginia Historical Society for 30 years. He became a charter member of the Richmond chamber of commerce in 1867. He was also president of the A. M. Lyons Tobacco Company and was director of the Richmond and Danville Railroad.

Historian James Robertson, Hill's biographer, called Palmer "polished, highly organized, and indefatigable" as well as "Hill's most trusted aide."

== Personal life ==
Palmer married Elizabeth Amiss of Blacksburg in November 1856. They had six children, Leila, Mrs. Frank Christian, Mrs. W. Ormond Young, Edwin A., William H. Jr. and Mrs. Robert Preston Means. He was senior warden of Grace Episcopal Church.

Palmer died on July 14, 1926, at his home at 211 West Franklin Street in Richmond. He was buried in Richmond's Hollywood Cemetery.
