= David Judson Burr =

American politician (1820–1876)

David Judson Burr (October 16, 1820 – August 3, 1876) was an American politician and businessman.

Burr, son of David J., and Arabella (Shedden) Burr, was born in Richmond, Virginia, October 16, 1820. He graduated from Yale College in 1839. After graduation, he studied law (partly in the Yale Law School), and was engaged in successful practice for a few years, but finding it ill-suited to his temperament he abandoned the profession and became a merchant. Although disinclined to public life, he served for several years at the urgent desire of his fellow citizens, in the Common Council of Richmond and in the Virginia State Legislature. On the organization of the Richmond Chamber of Commerce he was elected President, and continued in that office until he positively declined a re-election. His energies were directed to the advancements of the commercial interests of his native State and city; and to facilitate those interests he assumed, at the inception of the enterprise, the responsible and laborious duties of President of the Virginia Steamship Company, which he continued to discharge to the day of his death. He died in Richmond, August 3, 1876, from the effects of a paralytic stroke in 1873. He sympathized entirely with the South in the American Civil War, and was one of the committee who surrendered Richmond to the U S. troops, April 3, 1865. He was married in New York, April 10, 1844, to a daughter of Dr. H. W. Denison of Georgetown, S. C., and had six children, four of whom survived him. He was buried in Hollywood Cemetery.
