= Kathleen Bruce (historian) =

American historian (1885–1950)

- Born: Kathleen Eveleth Bruce; October 21, 1885; Richmond, Virginia, U.S.
- Died: April 26, 1950 (aged 64); Richmond, Virginia, U.S.
- Resting place: Hollywood Cemetery
- Education: Radcliffe College (AB, AM, PhD)
- Occupation: Historian
- Relatives: Joseph R. Anderson (grandfather); Philip Alexander Bruce (uncle); William Cabell Bruce (uncle)

Kathleen Eveleth Bruce (October 21, 1885 – April 26, 1950) was an American historian.

== Early life ==
Kathleen Eveleth Bruce was born on October 21, 1885, in Richmond, Virginia, to Mary Bruce (née Anderson) and T. Seddon Bruce. Her paternal grandparents lived at Staunton Hill. Her maternal grandfather was Joseph R. Anderson. Her uncles were Philip Alexander Bruce and William Cabell Bruce. She grew up in West Franklin Street Historic District. She graduated cum laude from Radcliffe College with a Bachelor of Arts in 1918, Master of Arts in 1919 and a PhD in 1924. She was a member of Phi Beta Kappa.

== Career ==
Bruce was assistant professor and later associate professor at Wheaton College from 1924 to 1926. She was professor of history at the College of William and Mary from 1926 to 1931. From 1928 to 1930, she was on leave and studied the economic history of the South using a special grant from the National Research Council for the social, cultural, and business lives of the planters in the South before the American Civil War. From 1931 to 1932, she worked for the McCormick Biographical Association as a research associate in the department of agriculture of the Museum of Science and History in Chicago. Afterward, she became joint director of the Nettie Fowler McCormick Foundation. In 1933, she was appointed professor of history at Hollins College. In 1936, she returned to Richmond and served as regional director of the survey of federal archives. She later served as the state supervisor of federal archives and records in Virginia while researching the agricultural records of Berry Hill Plantation in Halifax County, Virginia. From 1943 to 1946, she was assistant professor of history at Sophie Newcomb College (part of Tulane University). In 1946, she moved back to Richmond and was professor of history at Westhampton College (part of University of Richmond).

Bruce contributed articles to Army Ordnance, the Dictionary of American Biography and other publications. She was a life member of the American Historical Society. She wrote articles for the Agricultural History. She wrote Virginia Iron Manufacture in the Slave Era, Massachusetts Women of the Revolution (1716–1789), a chapter in The Commonwealth of Massachusetts Colony, Province and State, and Virginia Agricultural Decline Before 1860, A Fallacy. She was chairperson of the program committee of the Southern Historical Association. She was a member of the board of editors of the Mississippi Valley Historical Review for three years. She was also on the executive committee of the Southern Historical Association.

== Personal life ==
Bruce lived some years in the western United States. She traveled abroad, including a trip to Leningrad, Siberia, Mongolia, China, Manchuria, Korea and Japan.

Bruce became chronically ill in January 1949. Bruce died on April 26, 1950, at a nursing home in Richmond. She was buried in Hollywood Cemetery.
