= Albert Lybrock =

American architect (1827–1886)

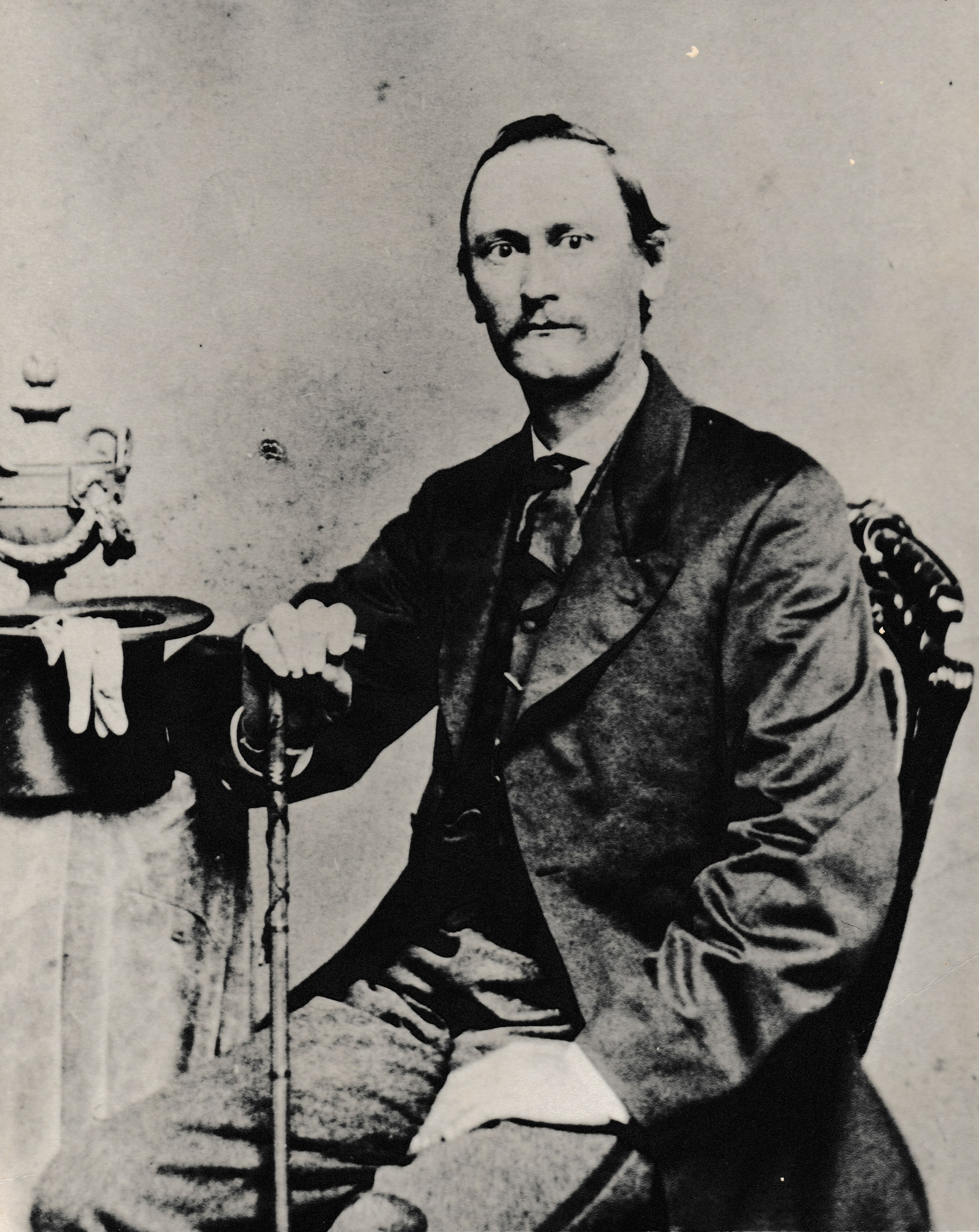
- Portrait of Lybrock
- Born: January 12, 1827; Sankt Johann, German Confederation
- Died: January 11, 1886 (aged 58); Richmond, Virginia, U.S.
- Resting place: Hollywood Cemetery
- Education: University of Karlsruhe
- Occupation: Architect
- Notable work: James Monroe Tomb; The Miller School of Albemarle

Albert Lybrock (January 12, 1827 – January 11, 1886) was a German-born architect in the United States. He was a slave owner and financed and commanded the Marion Rifles, a German infantry organization of the Confederate States Army. He was known for his work in Virginia, including the James Monroe Tomb and The Miller School of Albemarle.

== Early life ==
Albert Lybrock was born on January 12, 1827, in Sankt Johann, German Confederation. At the age of 20, he graduated from the school of architecture of the University of Karlsruhe.

== Career ==
Lybrock immigrated to New York City in 1849 and moved to Richmond, Virginia, in 1852. A few months later, he was appointed by the federal government as supervising architect of the customs house in Richmond. He was a slave owner. He financed and commanded the Marion Rifles, a chiefly German infantry organization. He served during the Peninsula campaign under John B. Magruder. After the campaign, he remained in service for about a year and a half longer. He was a member of the firm Wendenburg & Lybrock and remained with the firm until the firm dissolved at the end of the war. He had the Haxall and Morson families as clients and may have been the designer of Morson's Row and the Bolling Haxall House. Towards the end of his life, he worked with Carl Ruehrmund.

Lybrock then started the architectural firm Lybrock & Gibson. The firm dissolved after a short time after Gibson's departure and death. He was then senior member of the architectural firm Lybrock & Seibert. They planned and built houses, including the State Bank, Levy Brothers store and the Shafer building. He built the Mozart Academy. He was a member of the common council and a member of the Germania Lodge, Knights of Pythias and the Gesangverein Virginia.

== Personal life ==
Around 1879, in the City of Washington, Lybrock dislocated his hip which impacted his health. He died of apoplexy on January 11, 1886, at his home on Clay Street in Richmond. He was buried in Hollywood Cemetery.

== Work ==
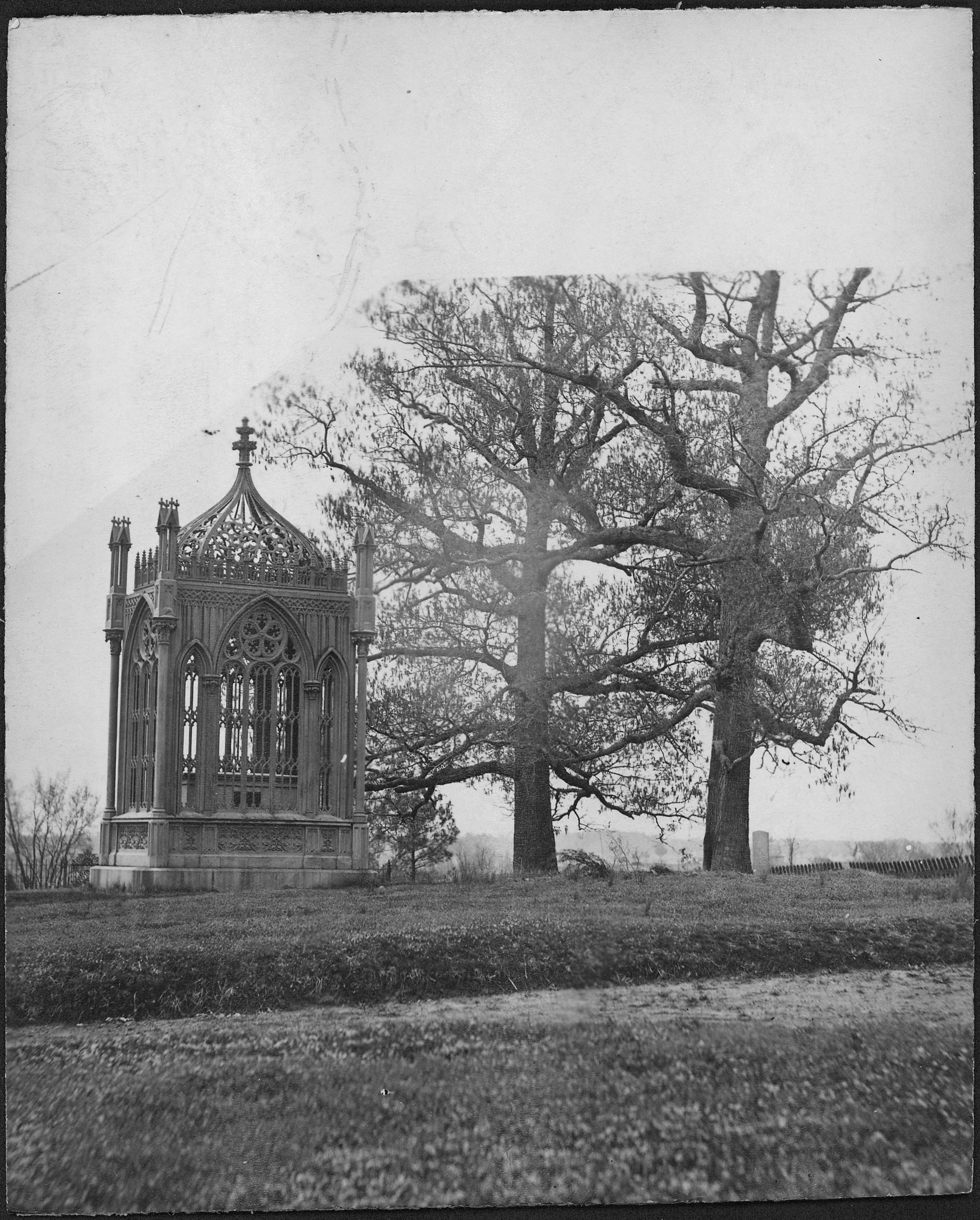
Tomb of James Monroe in Hollywood Cemetery (Richmond, Virginia)

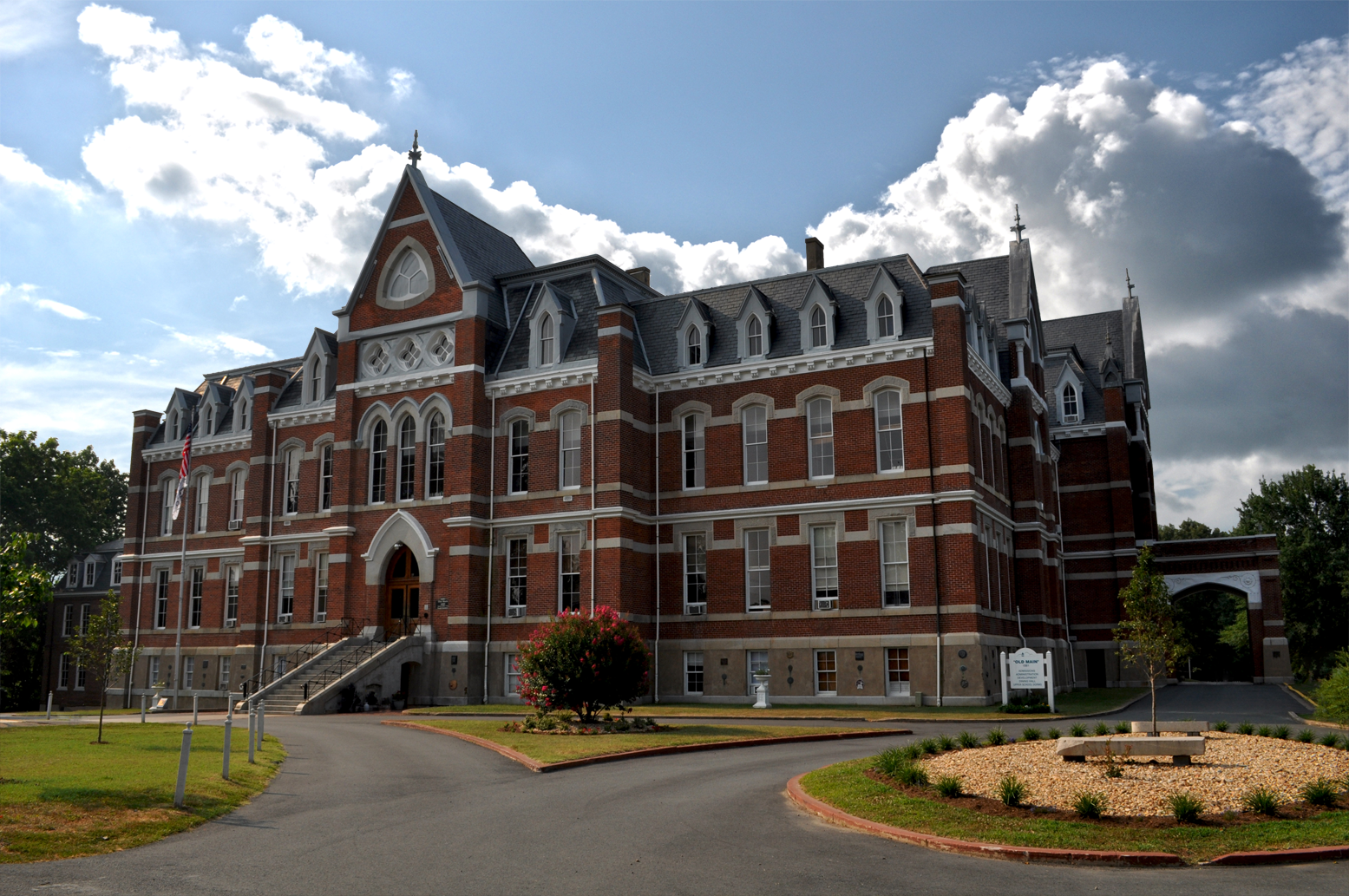
"Old Main" at the Miller School

- Morson’s Row (1853)
- interior renovations of the Virginia State Capitol (1858)
- James Monroe Tomb in Hollywood Cemetery (1858)
- United States Customs House addition between Main Street and Bank Street (now the Lewis F. Powell Jr. United States Courthouse)
- The Miller School of Albemarle - Albemarle County
