= William Wortham Pool =

American bookkeeper

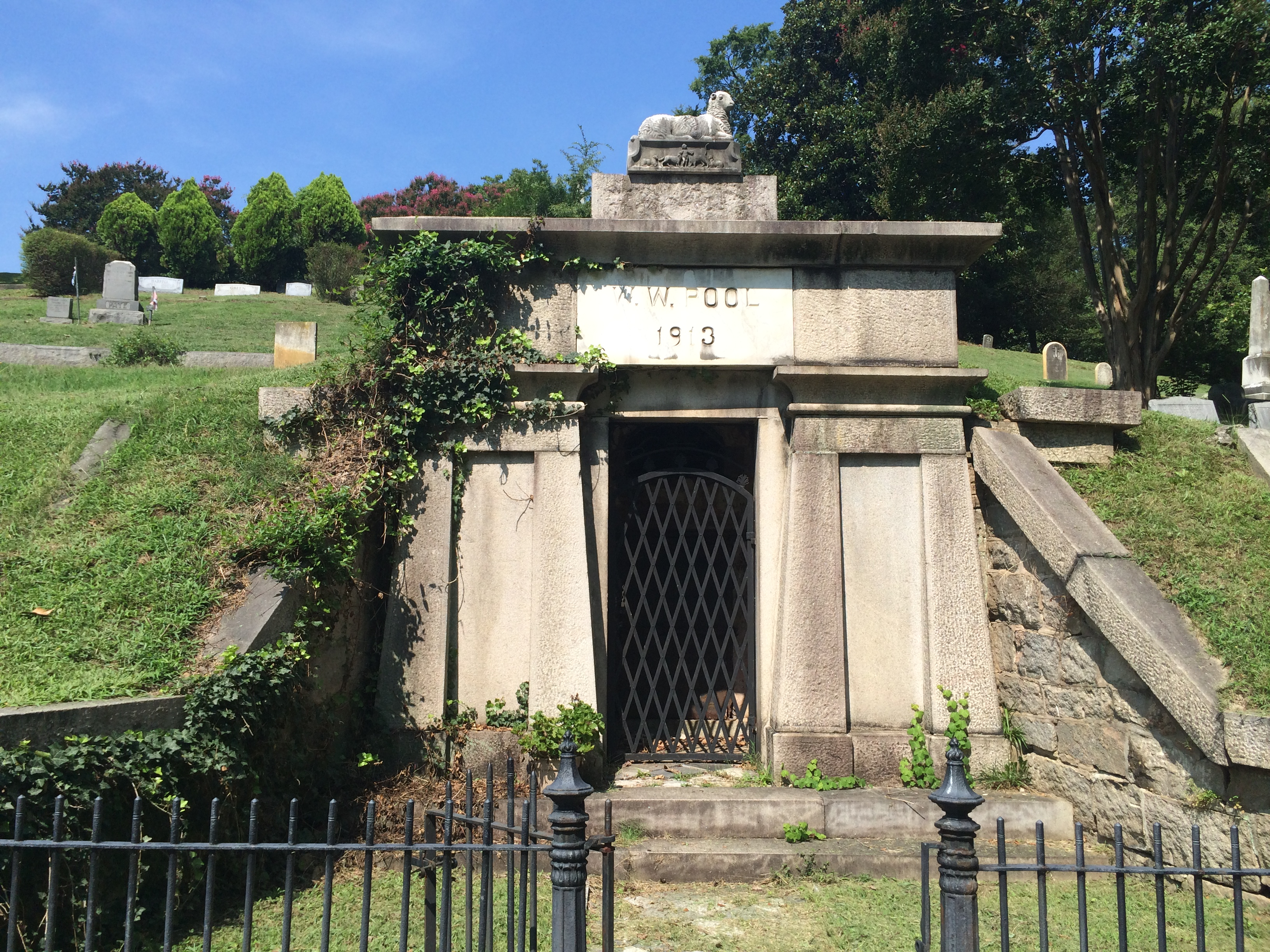
William Wortham Pool's grave in Hollywood Cemetery

William Wortham Pool (April 1842 – February 1922) was an American bookkeeper. His name and burial site are associated with the Richmond Vampire.

He was born in Mississippi, the son of Samuel Pool (1806–1872) and Nancy Rose Wortham (1819–1873). His siblings were John R. Pool (1840–?); Thomas Pool (1844–?); Albert Pool (1847–?); and Dirdus Pool (1850–?). His father was a merchant and, in 1860, William was a clerk in Jackson.

In the 1860s, Pool moved to Virginia. He was a clerk in a tobacco factory in Manchester, in 1870. In 1880 and 1900, he was a bookkeeper. He was working as a private secretary in 1910; then as a bookkeeper again in 1920 in Richmond.

In c. 1866, he and Alice Purdue (December 1842–Feb. 6, 1913) were married. They had four children, Lawrence P. Pool (c. 1867–?); Annie W. Pool (October 1872–?); Samuel Pool (March 1875–?); and Mary L. Pool (July 1881–?). His wife and children were all born in Virginia.

William W. Pool died at age 80. He was interred in Hollywood Cemetery, Richmond. His family tomb is inscribed with the date 1913, the year of his wife's burial. Their bodies have been relocated to escape vandalism brought on by the vampire rumors.
