= Hollywood Cemetery (Richmond, Virginia) =

Historic cemetery in Richmond, Virginia

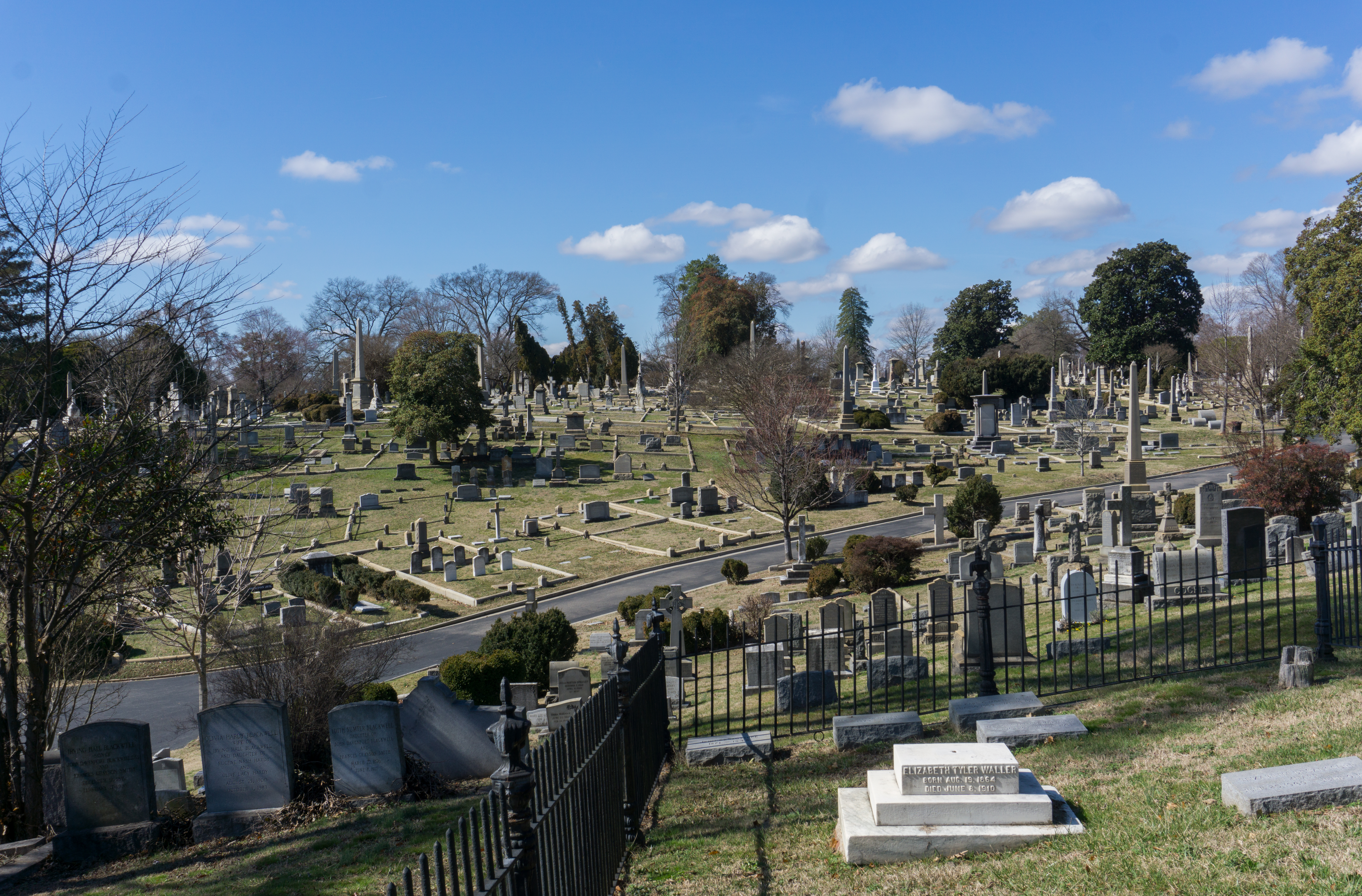
- Interactive map of Hollywood Cemetery

Details
- Established: 1847; 179 years ago
- Country: United States
- Website: www.hollywoodcemetery.org
- Hollywood Cemetery
- U.S. National Register of Historic Places
- U.S. Historic district
- Virginia Landmarks Register
- Location: 412 S. Cherry St., Richmond, Virginia
- Coordinates: 37°32′09″N 77°27′25″W
- Area: 135 acres (546,000 m^{2})
- Built: 1849
- Architect: John Notman
- NRHP reference No.: 69000350
- VLR No.: 127-0221

Significant dates
- Added to NRHP: November 12, 1969
- Designated VLR: September 9, 1969

Hollywood Cemetery is a historic rural cemetery in the Oregon Hill neighborhood of Richmond, Virginia, United States. Established in 1847, it was designed by the landscape architect John Notman. The 135-acre cemetery (55 ha) overlooks the James River. As the burial place of James Monroe and John Tyler, it is one of three places in the United States that contain the remains of two U.S. Presidents, the others being Arlington National Cemetery and United First Parish Church.

Due to Richmond's role as capital of the Confederate States of America during the American Civil War, the cemetery contains the burials of many government officials of the confederacy including president Jefferson Davis and secretary of war James A. Seddon. Hollywood contains the burials of 25 Confederate States Army officers including generals J. E. B. Stuart, Fitzhugh Lee and George Pickett. The cemetery contains the remains of over 11,000 confederate soldiers. They are memorialized by the Monument of the Confederate War Dead, a 90-foot tall (27 m) granite pyramid built in 1869. The cemetery is considered the unofficial National Confederate Cemetery and has hosted ceremonies commemorating Confederate Memorial Day since 1866. Hollywood Cemetery was added to the National Register of Historic Places in 1969.

== Description ==
The cemetery is in the Oregon Hill neighborhood of Richmond. It is 135 acres in size and overlooks the James River. It is one of the most visited cemeteries in Virginia.

=== Presidents Circle ===
Hollywood Cemetery is the only cemetery besides Arlington National Cemetery that contains the burials of two U.S. Presidents. Although the United First Parish Church in Quincy, Massachusetts, contains the burial sites of two U.S. Presidents, John Adams and John Quincy Adams, they are in a crypt below the church.

President James Monroe was originally interred in Marble Cemetery in New York City when he died in 1831. Virginia petitioned to have his remains reinterred to Hollywood Cemetery. The Gothic Revival James Monroe Tomb monument designed by Albert Lybrock resembles a bird cage surrounding a simple granite sarcophagus. It was built in the Presidents Circle section of the cemetery and dedicated by Virginia governor Henry A. Wise on July 5, 1858. The monument was designated a National Historic Landmark in 1971.

President John Tyler was buried in the Presidents Circle section of the cemetery in 1862 and a monument was dedicated by Congress in 1915. His death was not recognized in Washington, D.C., due to his allegiance to the confederacy. His burial ceremony was escorted by Jefferson Davis and address given by Armistead C. Gordon.

Confederate president Jefferson Davis died in 1889. He was initially interred in Metairie Cemetery in New Orleans, and reinterred to Hollywood Cemetery in 1893. A life-size statue made of bronze sculpted by George Julian Zolnay was added near his grave.

=== Monument of Confederate War Dead ===
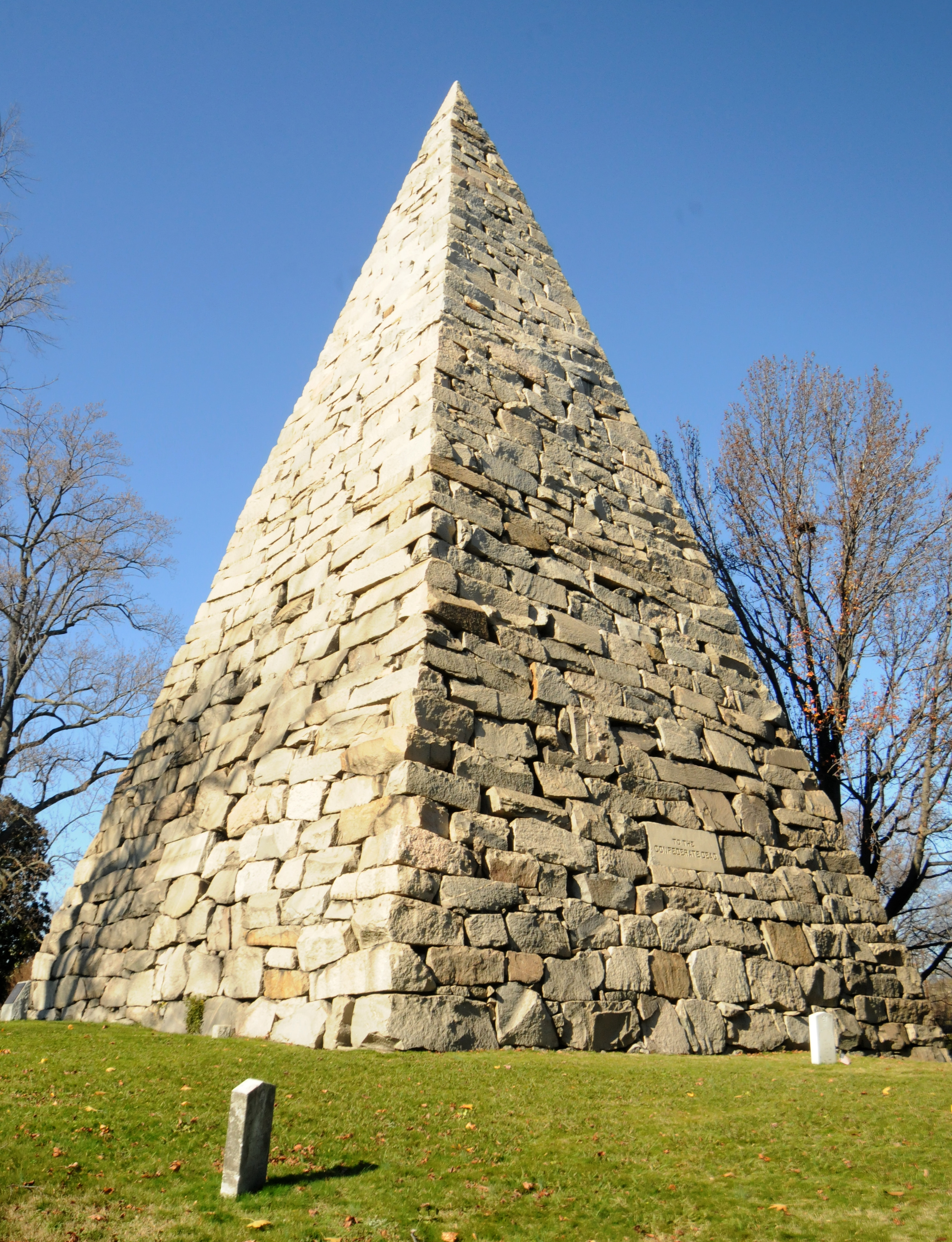
The Monument of Confederate War Dead

In 1869, a 90-foot (27 m) high granite pyramid designed by Charles H. Dimmock was built as a memorial to the more than 11,000 enlisted men of the Confederate Army buried in the cemetery. The burials of 25 Confederate Army officers includes J.E.B. Stuart, Fitzhugh Lee and George Pickett. The cemetery is unofficially considered the Confederate National Cemetery.

The monument is made of roughly cut James River granite blocks. The monument is inscribed with text in Latin that translates to, "In eternal memory of those who stood for God and Country." It was a project supported by the Hollywood Ladies' Memorial Association, a group of Southern women dedicated to honoring and caring for the burial sites of fallen Confederate soldiers. The pyramid became a symbol of the Hollywood Memorial Association, appearing on its stationery as well as on the front of a pamphlet of buried soldiers, the Register of the Confederate Dead.

== History ==
William Byrd III, a wealthy planter, politician and military officer, was facing financial problems and divided his estate in Richmond known as the Belvidere into several plots 100-acres in size for sale. The Harvie family bought several of these lots which became known as "Harvie's Woods."

In 1847, Joshua J. Fry and William H. Haxall, visited Mount Auburn Cemetery in Boston, Massachusetts. They were impressed with Mount Auburn and proposed the creation of a similar rural cemetery in Richmond. It was through their efforts and the subsequent cooperation of local citizens that Hollywood Cemetery was created.

Fry, Haxall, and 40 other prominent Richmond citizens purchased 42 acres from Lewis E. Harvie on June 3, 1847, for $4,075 to establish the cemetery. The founders hired John Notman, who was the landscape architect for Laurel Hill Cemetery in Philadelphia, to design the cemetery in the rural garden style. It was originally planned to be named Mount Vernon Cemetery, however Notman proposed the name Hollywood due to the abundance of holly trees on the property. Oliver P. Baldwin delivered the dedication address in 1849.

Hollywood Cemetery became so popular, that by the mid-1850s, the city of Richmond implemented a horse-drawn omnibus service to transport visitors there every afternoon. A streetcar line was added in the 1860s.

=== American Civil War ===
At the outbreak of the American Civil War, the cemetery directors set aside two acres for confederate soldier burials which became known as the Soldiers' Section. Richmond citizens became outraged when they learned that soldiers who died in local hospitals were buried in potter's fields. In response to the outrage, the city increased the number of burials of dead soldiers at Hollywood and established Oakwood Cemetery across town for additional burials.

The initial two acres assigned for soldier burials became full by July 1862 and the cemetery purchased additional land funded by the confederate government. By April 1865, the cemetery contained more than 11,000 confederate soldiers, which accounted for more than half of the total burials in the cemetery. After the war, the Ladies' Memorial Association worked to reinter 2,935 confederate soldiers from Gettysburg to Hollywood Cemetery. Confederate Civil War veterans continued to be buried in the cemetery into the 1900s.

At George Pickett's request, he was buried among his men in his native Richmond when he died in 1875. LaSalle “Sallie” Corbell Pickett hoped she could be buried there too. Women were not allowed to be buried in the soldiers’ section of Richmond's Hollywood Cemetery at the time of Mrs. Pickett’s death in 1931. In 1998, for the first time a woman's remains have ever been allowed in this area, Mrs. Pickett was reburied in the Gettysburg soldiers’ section of Hollywood Cemetery by her husband. “Mrs. Pickettt died in the early 1930s, and had wanted to be buried with her husband in the Hollywood Cemetery. But the Hollywood Ladies Memorial Society, which then controlled the Gettysburg Hill portion of the cemetery, would not allow it.” Richmond Discovery tour guide Jim DuPriest said.” So, Mrs. Pickett was buried in Abbey Mausoleum [which was] nearby, besides, and adjacent to Arlington National Cemetery in Northern Virginia.” … “Near the end of the ceremony, the families sprinkled soil from Mrs. Pickett’s home in Chuckatuck, Nansemond County, Virginia.”

=== Confederate Memorial Day ===
On May 31, 1866, Hollywood Cemetery held its first Confederate Memorial Day celebration, and over 20,000 people were in attendance. The celebrations "became imbued with cultural and religious symbolism that underscored the gravity of what it meant to be a southerner."

The second Confederate Memorial Day celebration in 1867 at Hollywood Cemetery differed greatly from the one the year before. There were fewer marches and military bands and more women and children in attendance.

=== Other history ===
In 1876, the Gothic Revival stone structure designed to look like a ruined medieval tower was built at the entrance. It was expanded to include the chapel, office and receiving vault. The current Cherry Street gate was constructed in 1897 when the city raised Cherry Street by 5 feet, which also required the stone Gatekeeper's tower to be heightened. In 1915, the Cherry Street entrance was closed and the present one was opened to better facilitate cars.

The cemetery expanded in 1877 with the purchase of an additional thirty-three acres along the river.

On November 12, 1969, Hollywood Cemetery was added to the National Register of Historic Places.

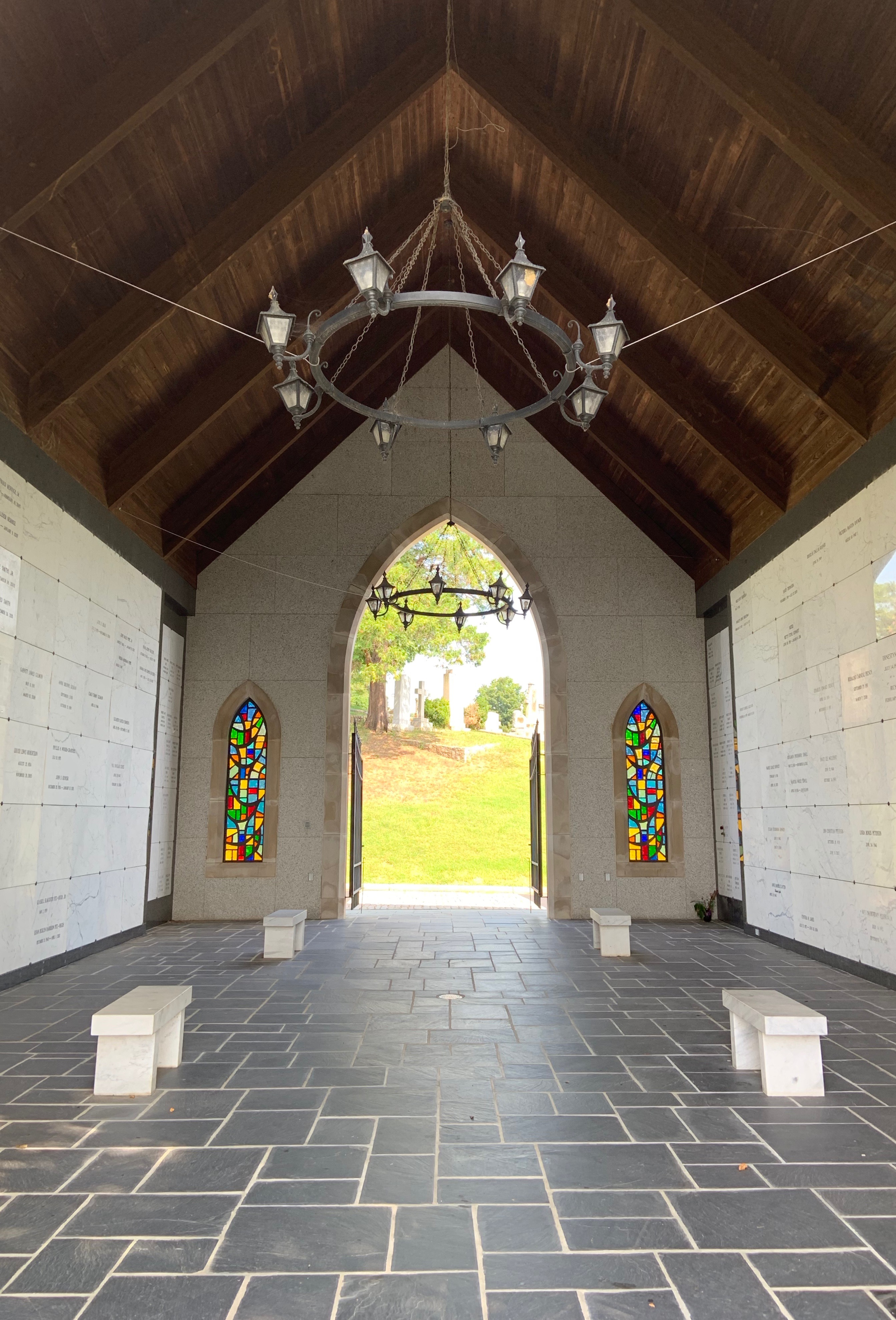
Interior of Palmer Chapel Mausoleum at Hollywood Cemetery

The Palmer Chapel Mausoleum was built 1992, adding 730 crypts for caskets and 160 cremation niches.

There are many local legends surrounding certain tombs and grave sites in the cemetery. One interesting grave is that of Florence Rees, a girl who died at 3 years old in 1862 of scarlet fever. The grave includes a cast-iron statue of a dog that stands watch over her. A local legend claims the statue was moved to the cemetery to prevent it from being melted down and used for bullets in the Civil War. There is also the legend of Richmond Vampire which purports that William Wortham Pool, buried in the cemetery, was a vampire.

In 2020, Hollywood Cemetery's board of directors banned the display of Confederate flags in the cemetery due to its connection as a symbol of racism and the potential to provoke vandalism.

A place rich in history, legend, and gothic landscape, Hollywood Cemetery is also frequented by many of the local students attending Virginia Commonwealth University.

== Gallery ==
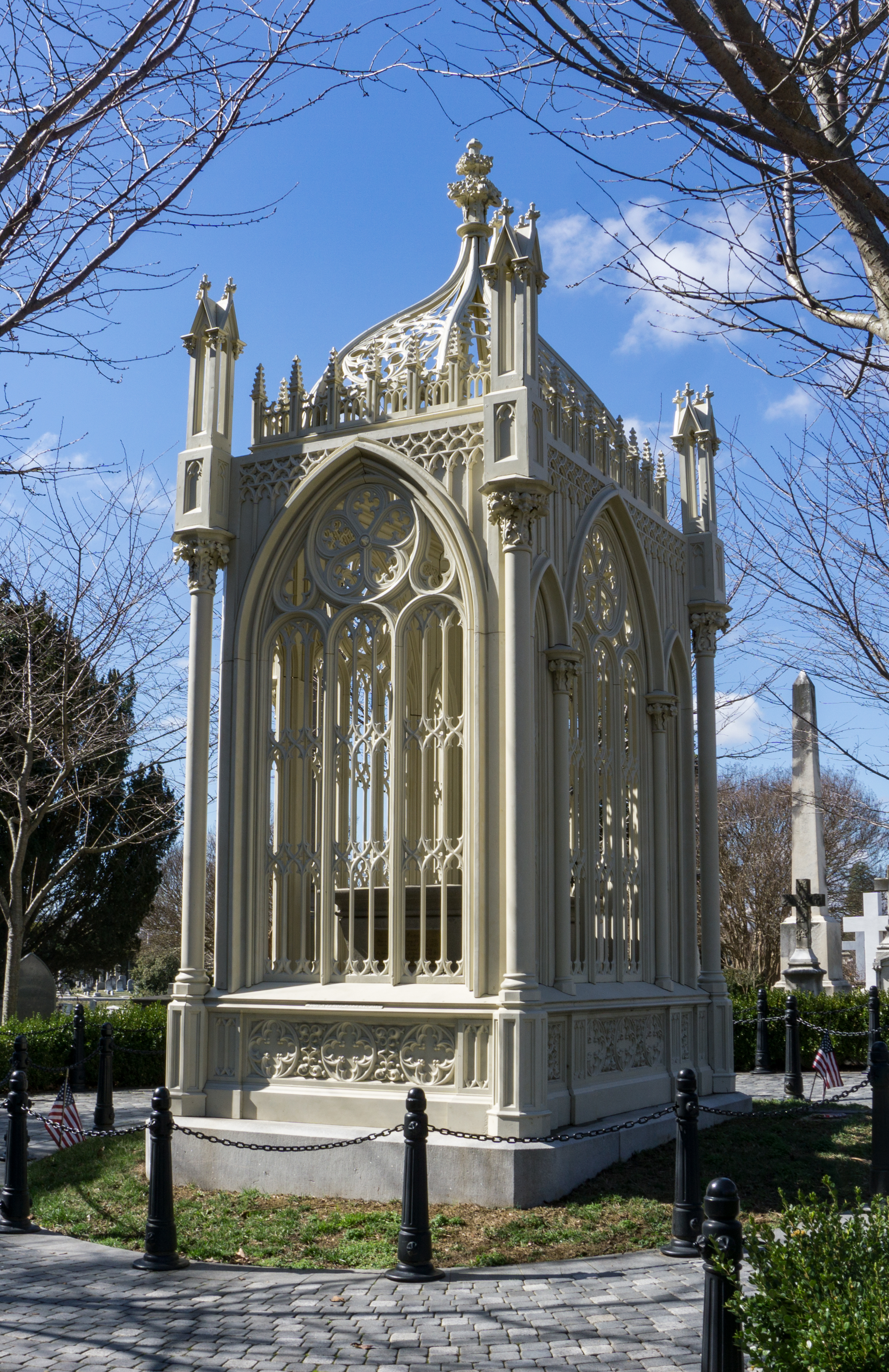
James Monroe grave after September 2016 renovation

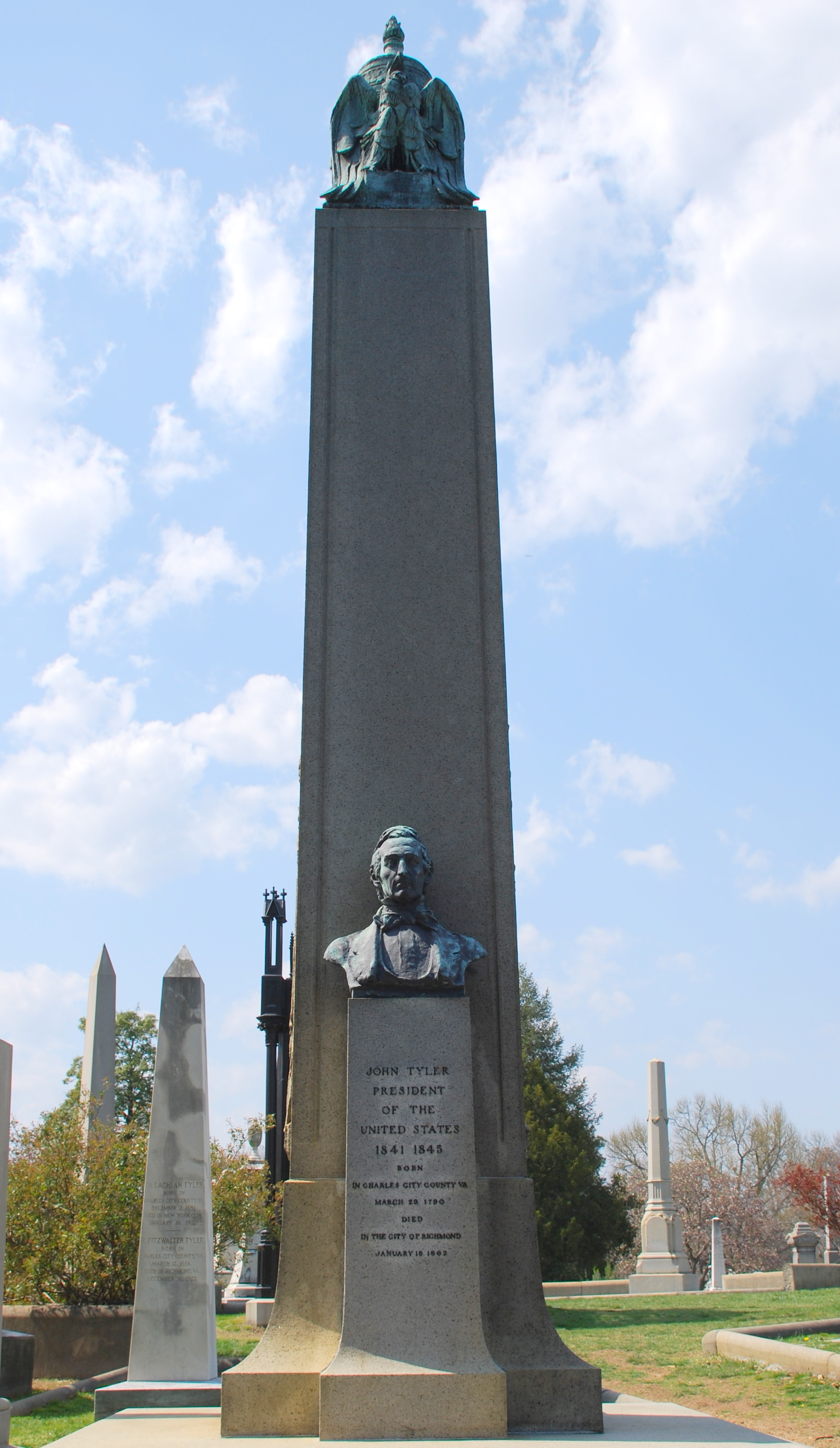
John Tyler grave

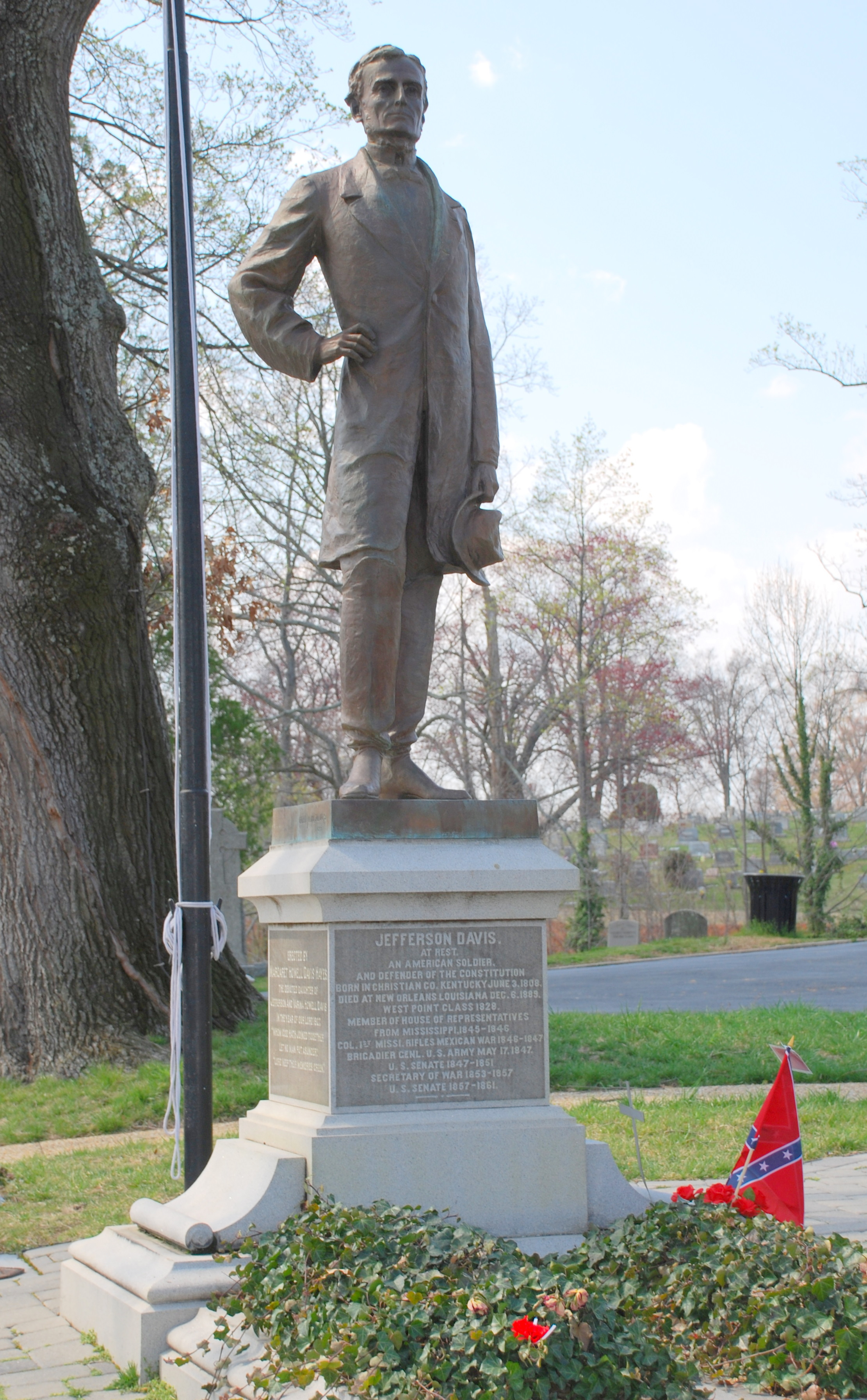
Jefferson Davis grave

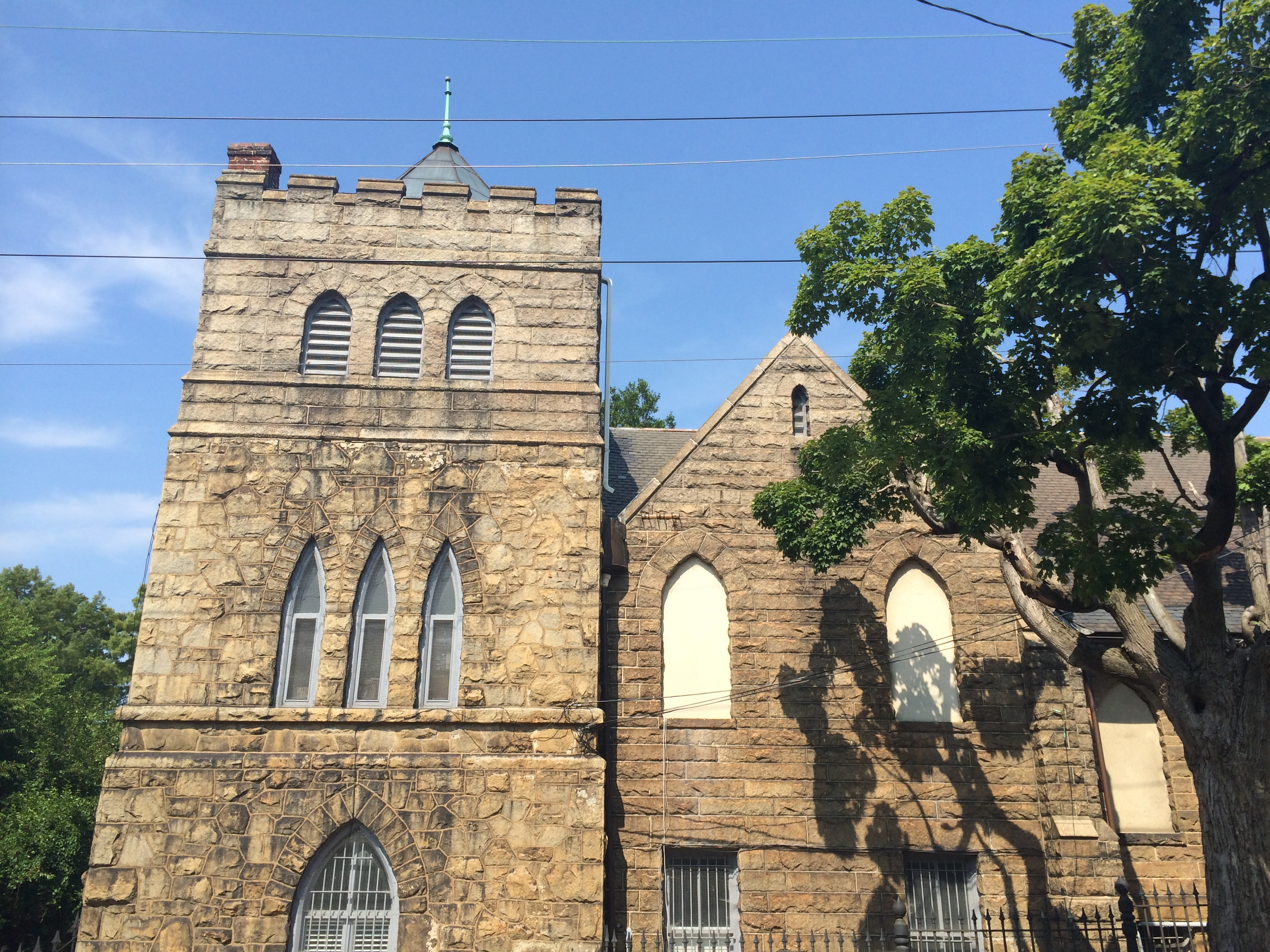
The chapel at the entrance of Hollywood Cemetery

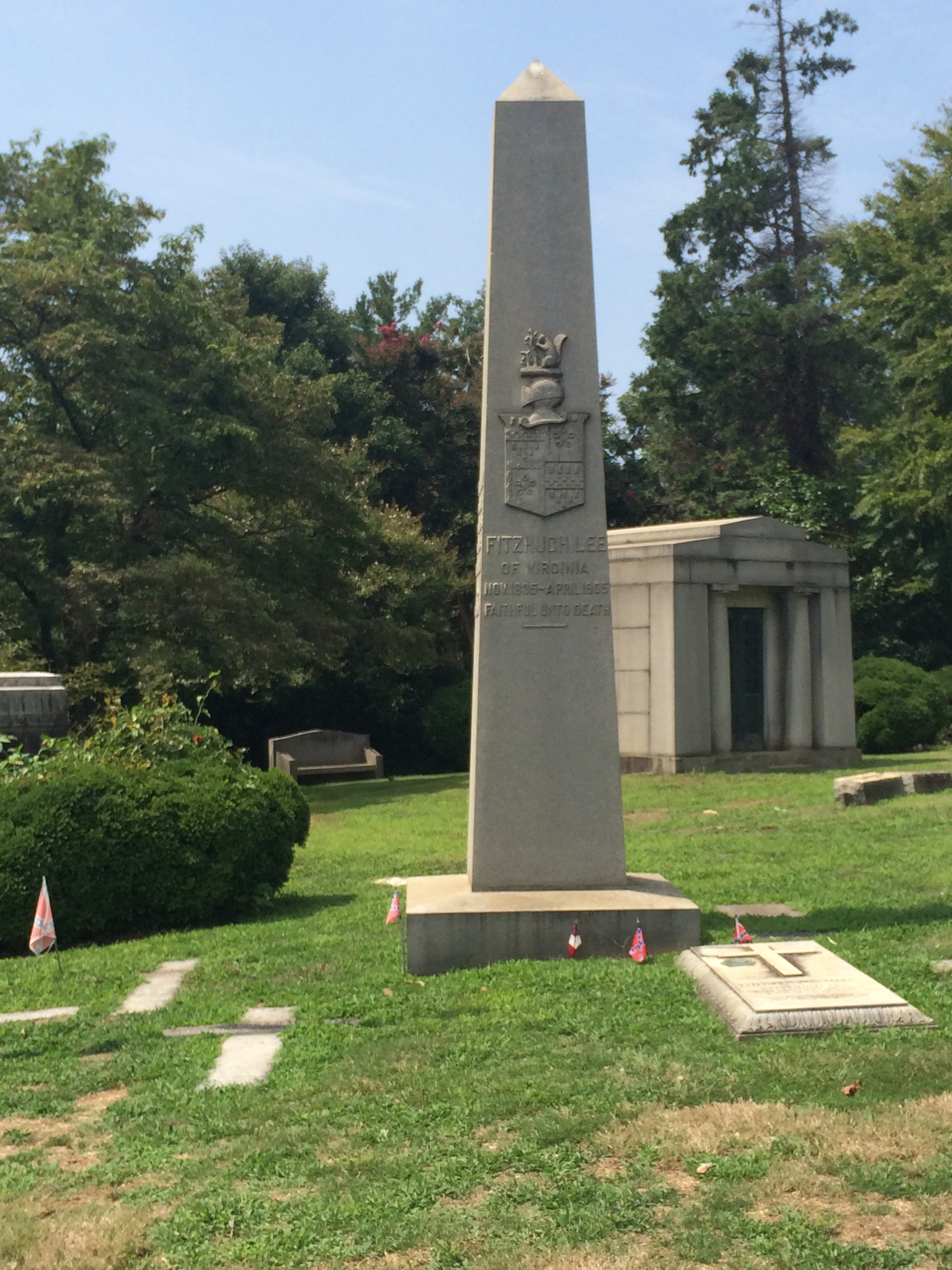
Fitzhugh Lee grave

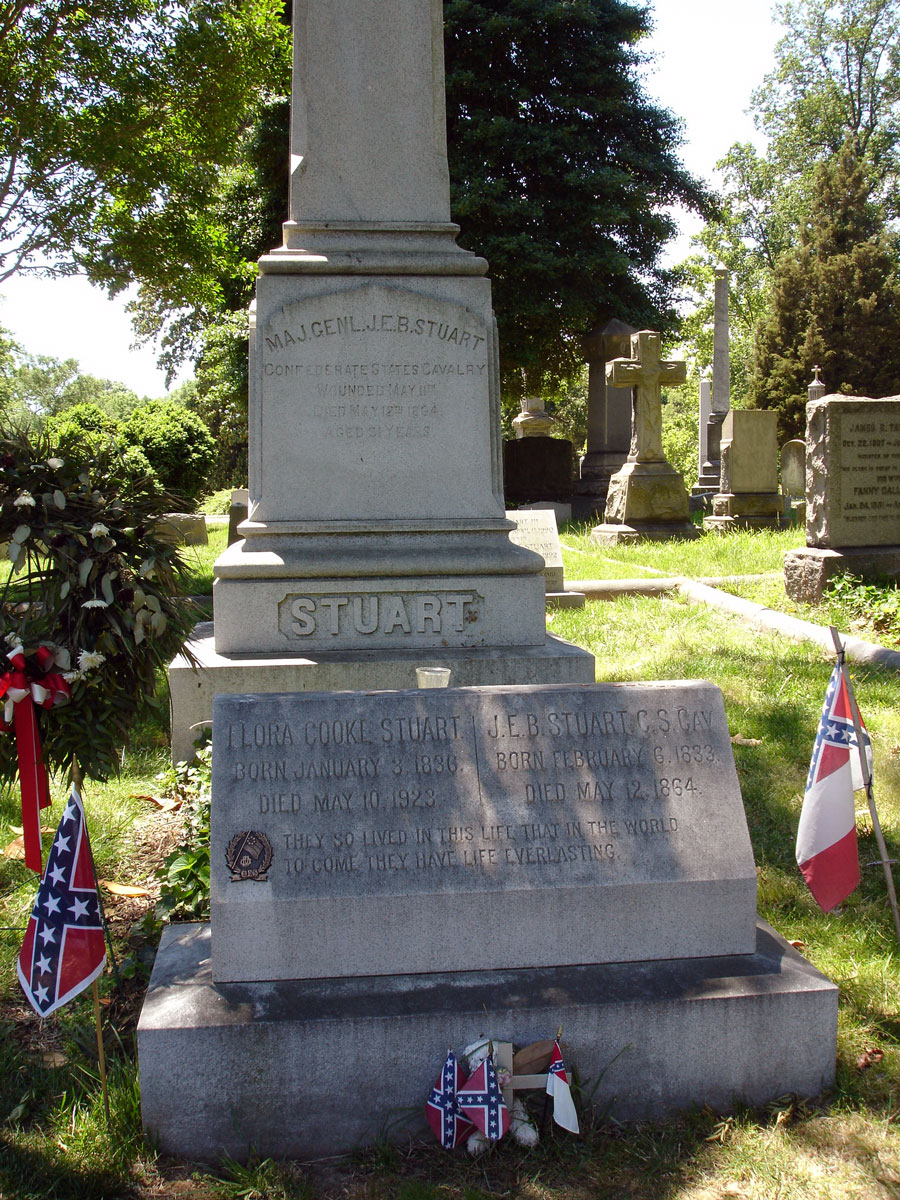
J.E.B. Stuart grave

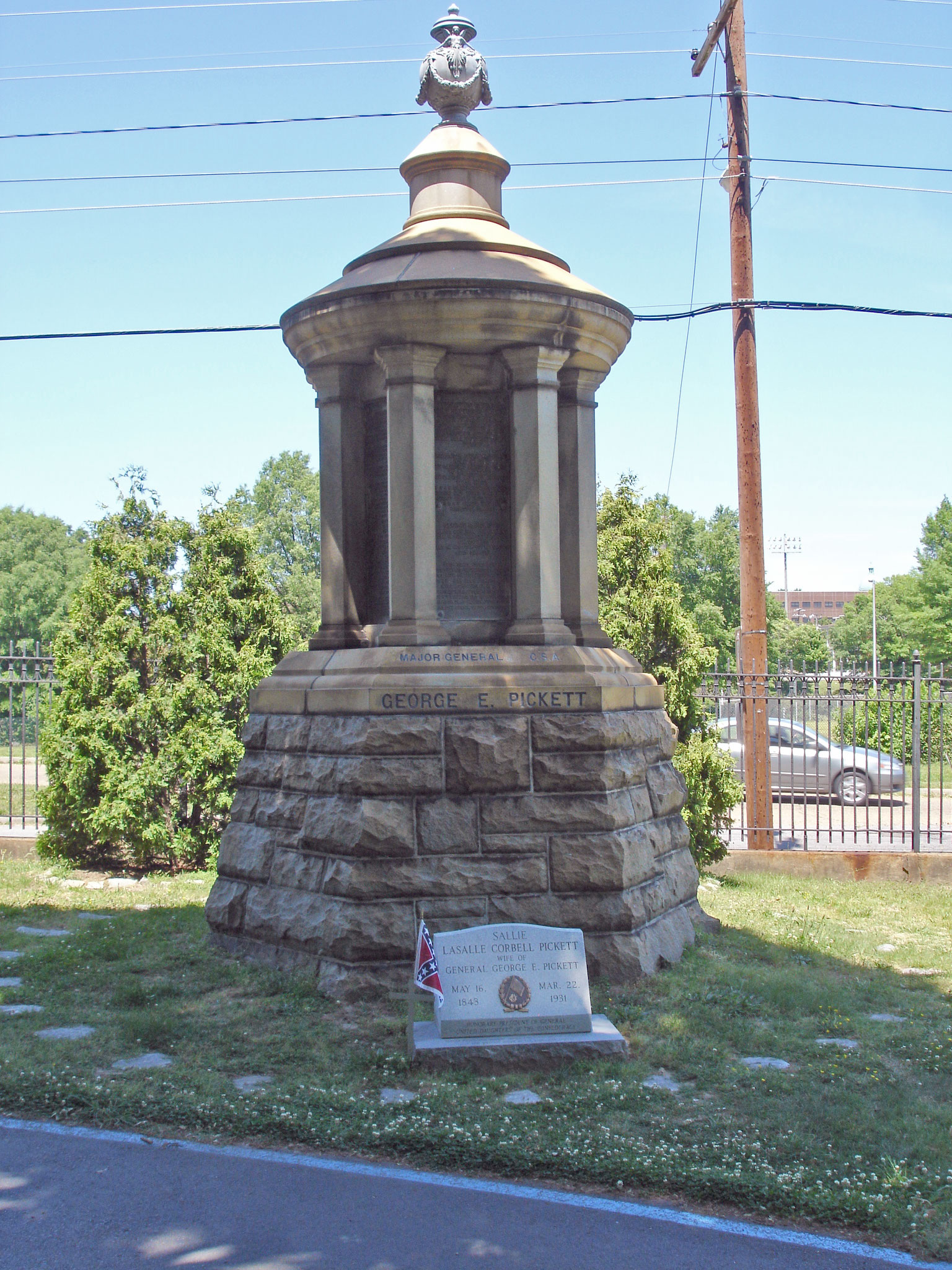
George Pickett grave

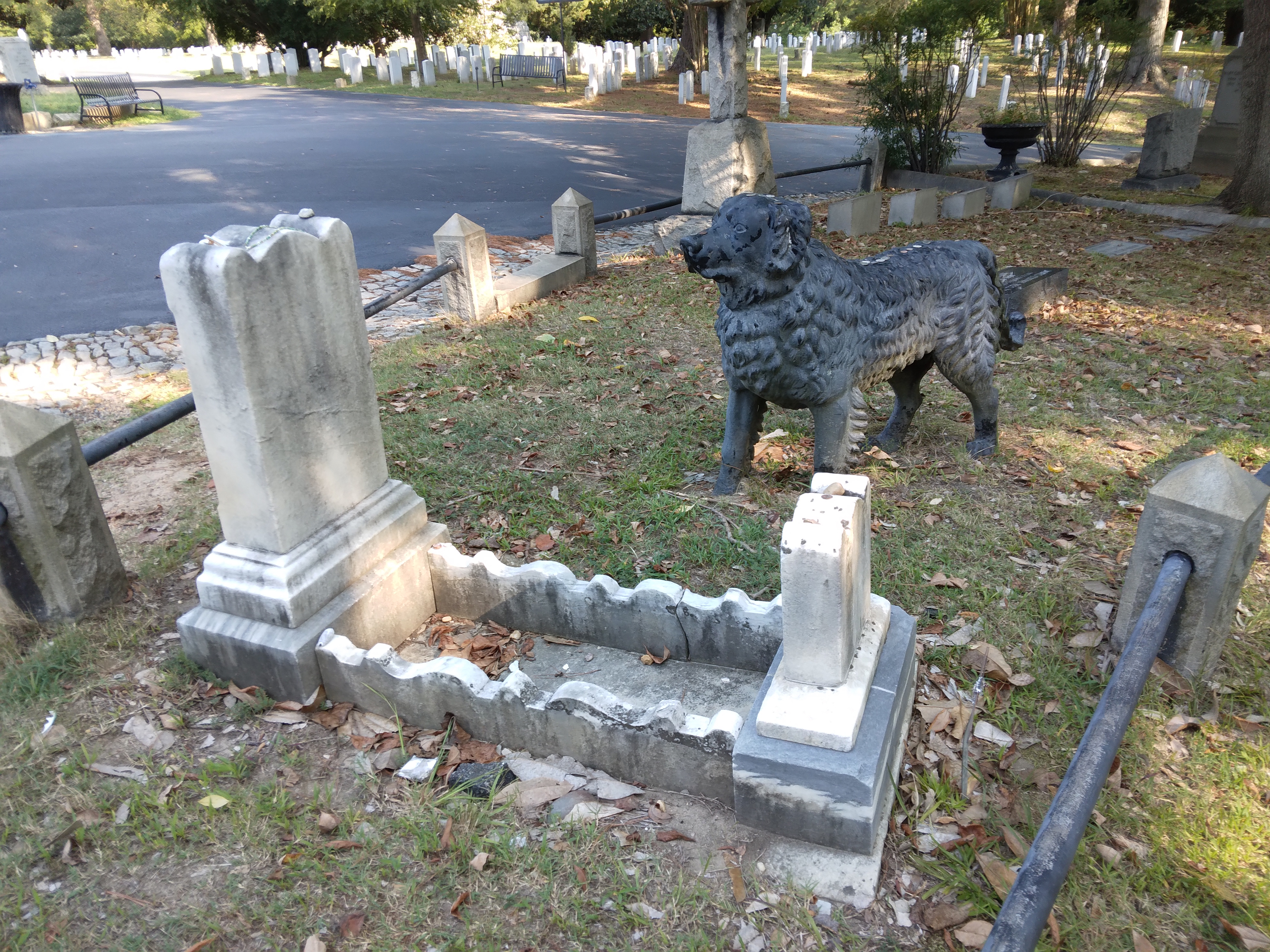
Cast-iron dog statue overlooking child's grave

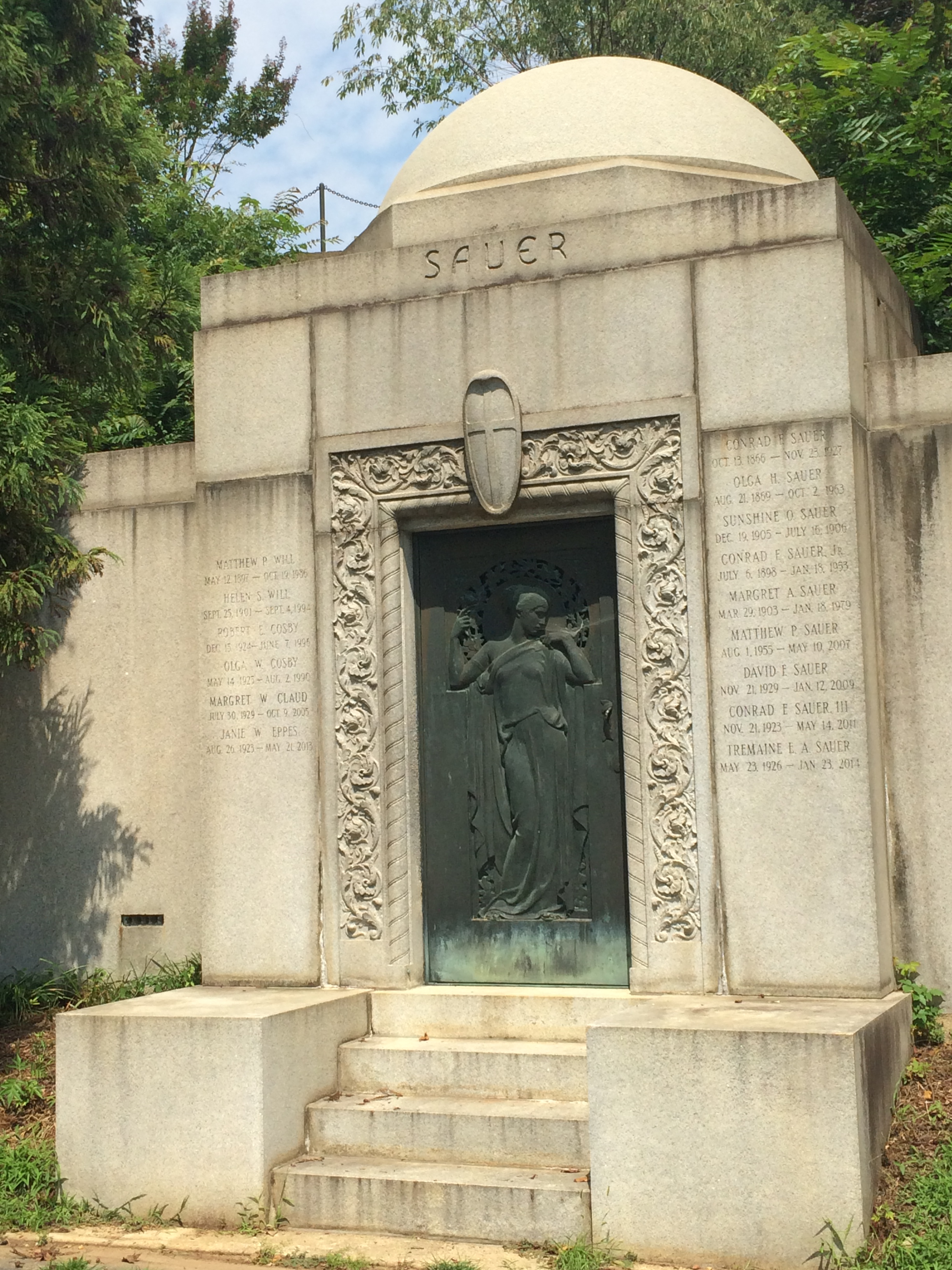
The Sauer family Mausoleum

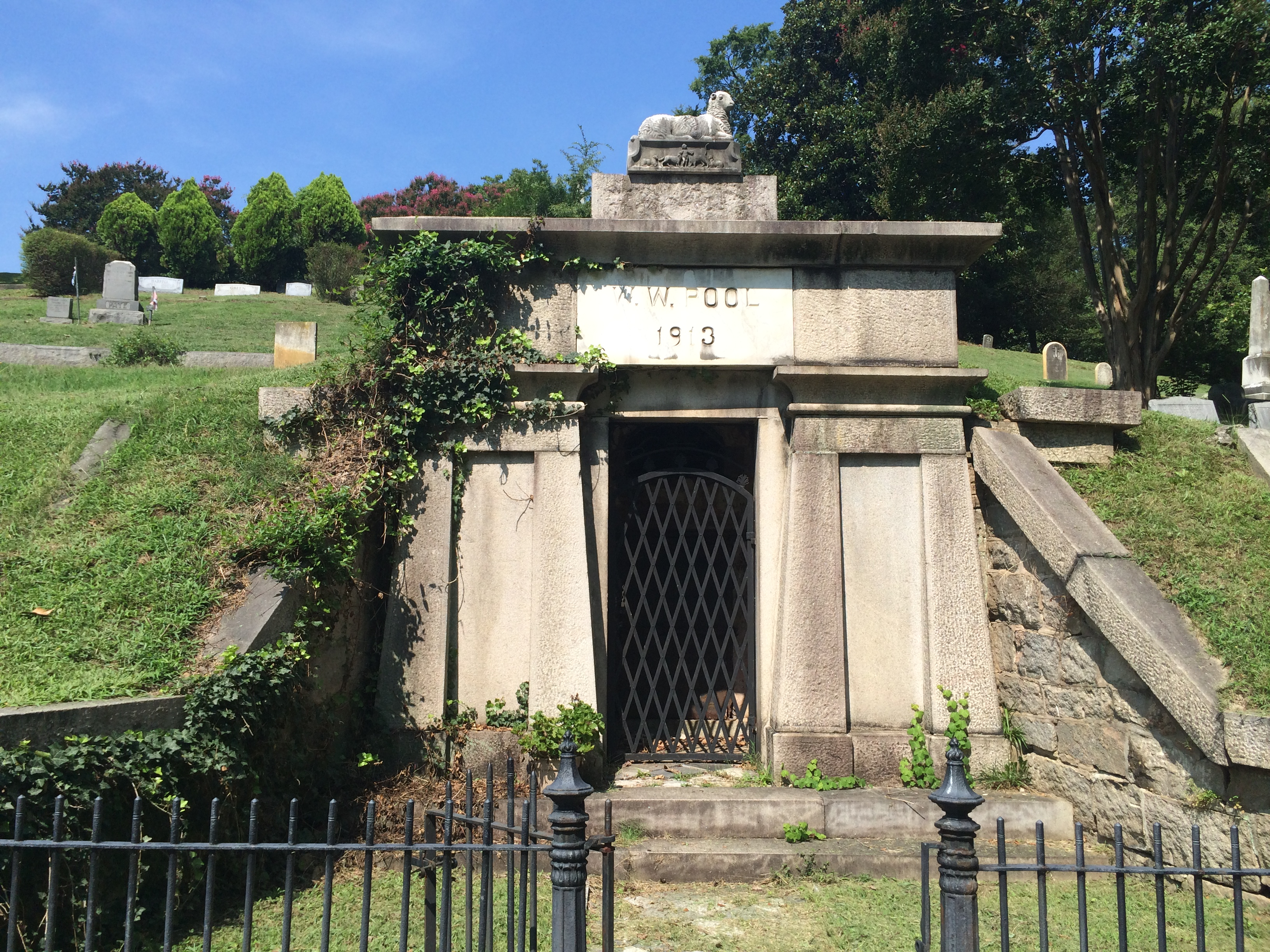
William Wortham Pool grave is associated with the Richmond Vampire urban legend

== See also ==
- List of burial places of presidents and vice presidents of the United States
- List of burial places of justices of the Supreme Court of the United States
- List of cemeteries in the United States
