= James Monroe Tomb =

- U.S. National Register of Historic Places
- U.S. National Historic Landmark
- U.S. Historic district – Contributing property
- Virginia Landmarks Register
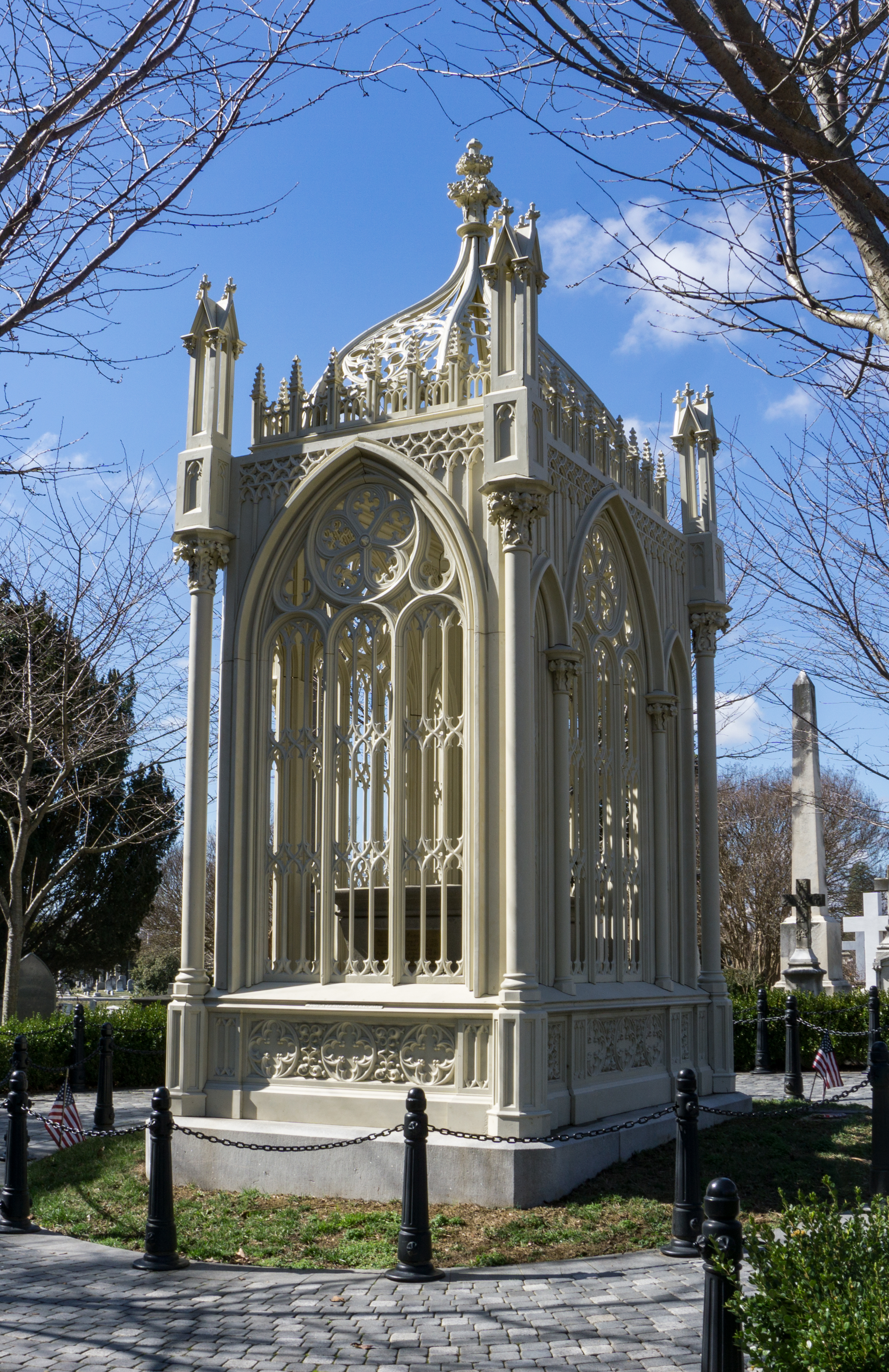
- Location: Hollywood Cemetery, 412 S. Cherry St., Richmond, Virginia, U.S.
- Coordinates: 37°32′6″N 77°27′20″W
- Built: 1859
- Architect: Albert Lybrock
- Architectural style: Gothic Revival
- Part of: Hollywood Cemetery (ID69000350)
- NRHP reference No.: 71001044
- VLR No.: 127-0221-0080

Significant dates
- Added to NRHP: November 11, 1971
- Designated NHL: November 11, 1971
- Designated CP: November 12, 1969
- Designated VLR: March 19, 1997

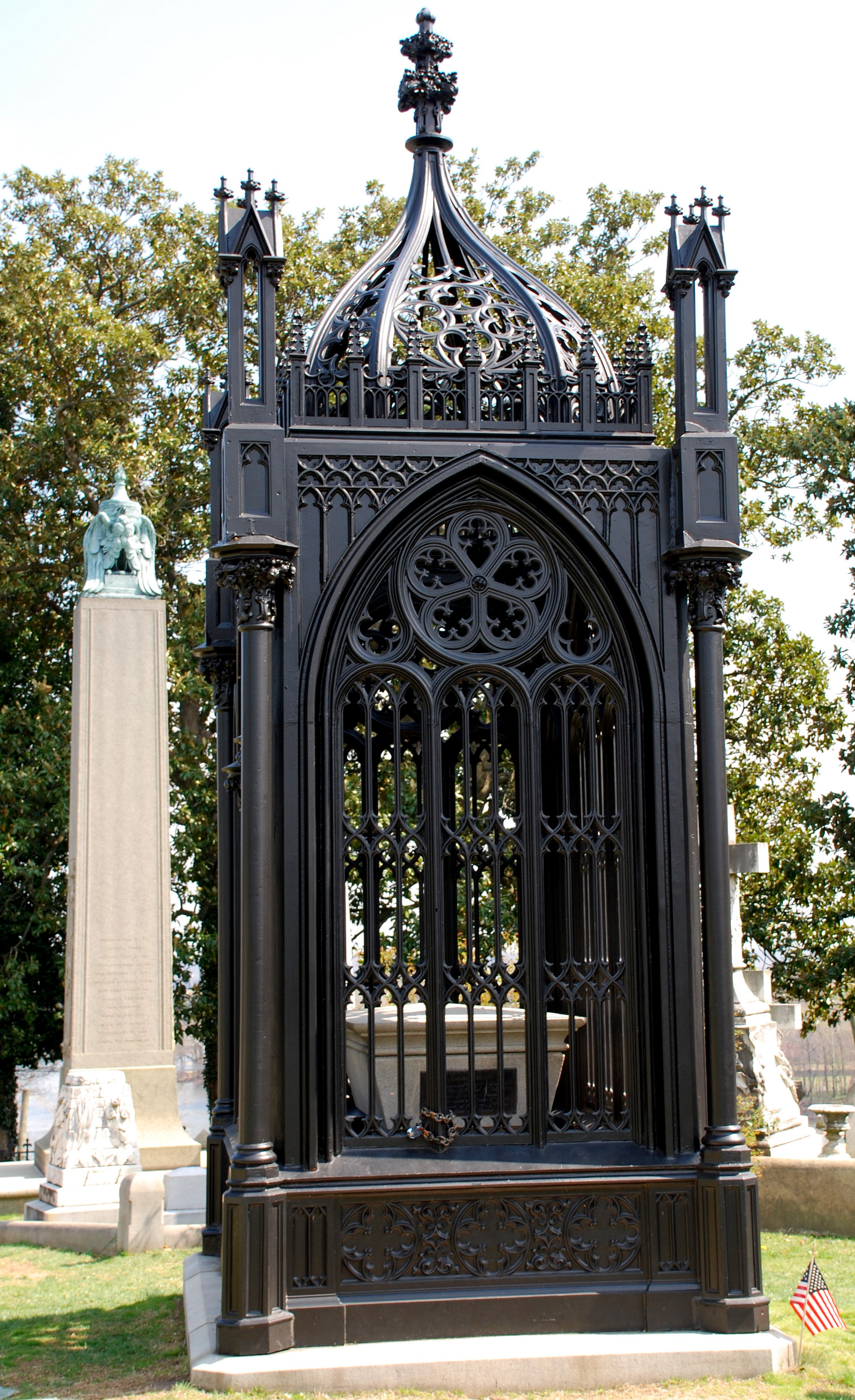
James Monroe Tomb, prior to 2016.

The James Monroe Tomb is the burial place of U.S. President James Monroe in Hollywood Cemetery, Richmond, Virginia, United States. The principal feature of the tomb is an architecturally unusual cast iron cage, designed by Albert Lybrock and installed in 1859 after Monroe's body was moved from Marble Cemetery in New York City. The tomb was declared a National Historic Landmark in 1971 for its unique architecture. Locally in Richmonders, it is colloquially known as "The Birdcage."

== Description and history ==
The James Monroe Tomb is located in the southern reaches of Hollywood Cemetery, in a prominent location surrounded by a circular drive and overlooking the James River. Monroe's body rests in a simple granite sarcophagus that is set on a granite plinth. Surrounding the sarcophagus is an elaborate Gothic Revival cast iron "cage", measuring about 9 by 13 feet (2.7 m × 4.0 m). Each face of the cage has a lancet-arched shape similar to that found in the tracery of larger Gothic stained glass windows, with a rose window pattern at the top of the arch. On the long sides, this main arch is flanked by narrow arches. The corners of the cage have colonettes surmounted by tabernacle-like structures. The top of the cage consists of ogee-curved elements meeting at a central spire. The grave of another president, John Tyler, is located just a few yards away.

James Monroe died in New York City in 1831, and was interred in Marble Cemetery. In 1856, Virginia Governor Henry A. Wise sought to repatriate Monroe's remains to his native state. The state appropriated funds, and Monroe's remains were transported to Richmond aboard the steamship Jamestown. The tomb, erected in 1859, was designed by the German-born architect Albert Lybrock, and its cast iron elements were cast by Wood and Perot of Philadelphia. The tomb is considered architecturally significant first for the scale of its use of cast iron, a material not commonly used at that time for that purpose, and for delicacy and degree of flamboyancy achieved in its creation, which could not have been done in stone.

In 2015, as a part of plans to celebrate the 200th Anniversary of Monroe's election as America's fifth president, Monroe's tomb received a $900,000 makeover from the Department of General Services in the state of Virginia. Almost forty percent of the tomb's cast iron structure was repaired and returned to a color closer to its original state. The restoration took close to a year to complete and was finished in September 2016.

== See also ==
- List of burial places of presidents and vice presidents of the United States
- List of National Historic Landmarks in Virginia
- National Register of Historic Places listings in Richmond, Virginia
