= Lewis F. Powell Jr. United States Courthouse =

- U.S. Post Office and Customhouse
- U.S. National Register of Historic Places
- U.S. Historic district – Contributing property
- Virginia Landmarks Register
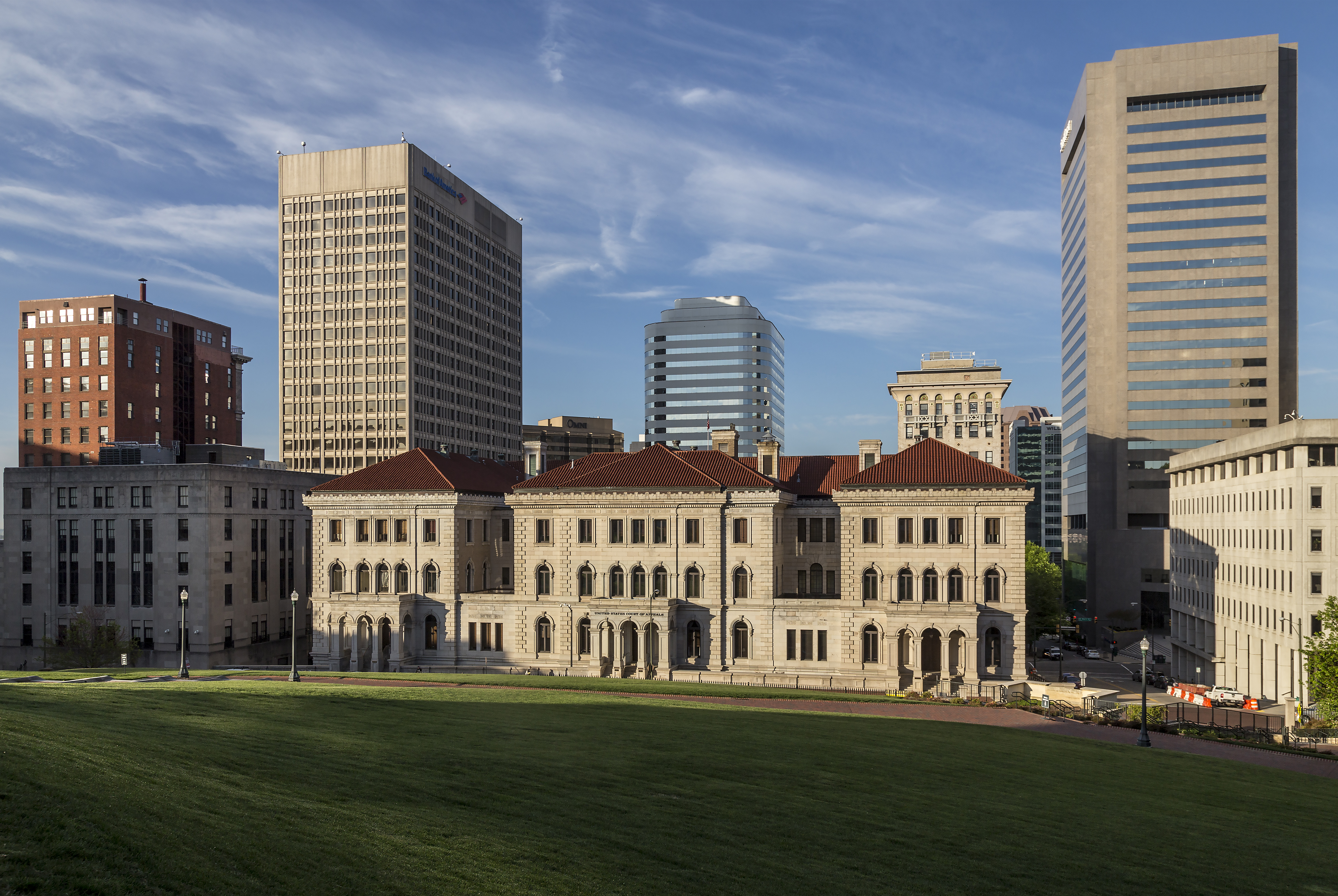
- Lewis F. Powell Jr. U.S. Courthouse in 2015

- Location within Virginia
- Location: 1000 E. Main St., Richmond, Virginia
- Coordinates: 37°32′15″N 77°26′6″W
- Area: 1 acre (0.40 ha)
- Built: 1858
- Architect: Ammi B. Young (original central building), Albert Lybrock (expansion)
- Architectural style: Italianate
- Part of: Main Street Banking Historic District (ID05000527)
- NRHP reference No.: 69000359
- VLR No.: 127-0170

Significant dates
- Added to NRHP: June 4, 1969
- Designated CP: June 01, 2005
- Designated VLR: November 5, 1968

The Lewis F. Powell Jr. United States Courthouse, also known as the U.S. Post Office and Customhouse, is a historic custom house, post office and courthouse located in Richmond, Virginia. Originally constructed in 1858, it was for decades a courthouse for the United States District Court for the Eastern District of Virginia and the United States Court of Appeals for the Fourth Circuit. A new federal district courthouse opened in 2008, but the Powell Courthouse still houses the Fourth Circuit. The United States Congress renamed the building for Supreme Court justice Lewis F. Powell Jr., in 1993. It is listed on the National Register of Historic Places as U.S. Post Office and Customhouse.

== Building history ==
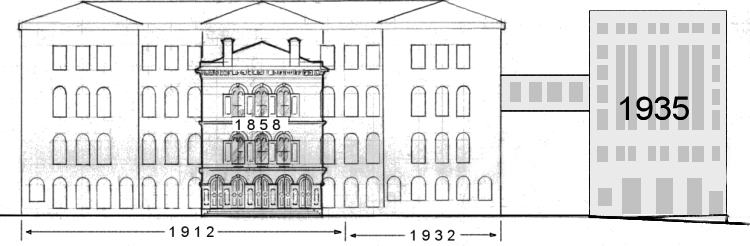
Courthouse Additions 1858-present

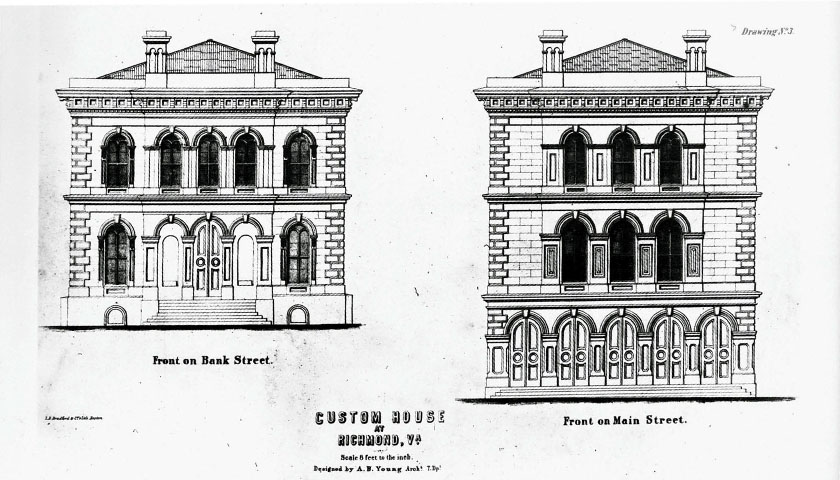
Richmond Customhouse,1856

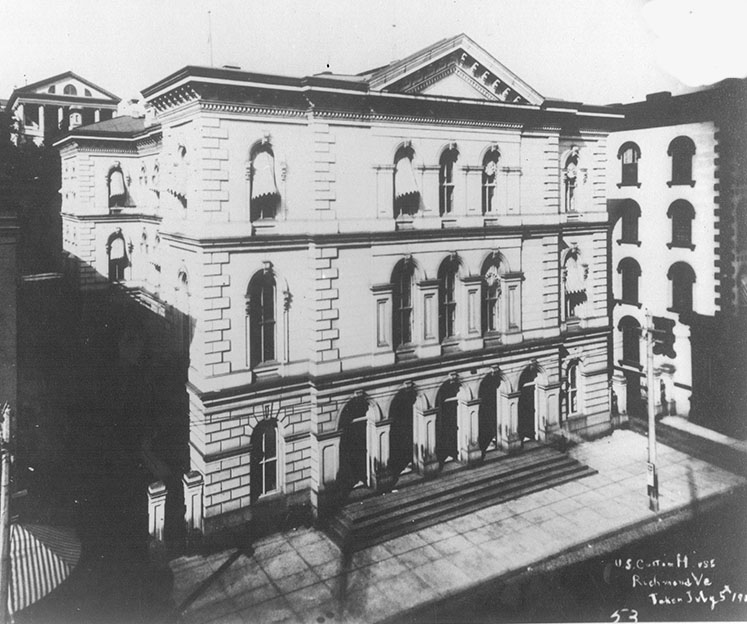
U. S. Customhouse, Richmond, VA 1900

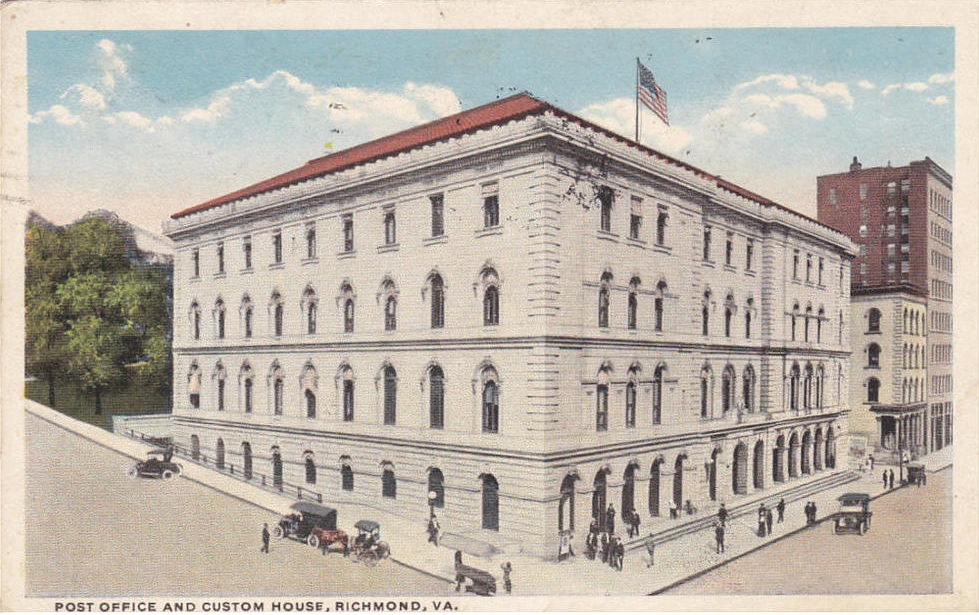
U. S. Post Office and Courthouse 1912

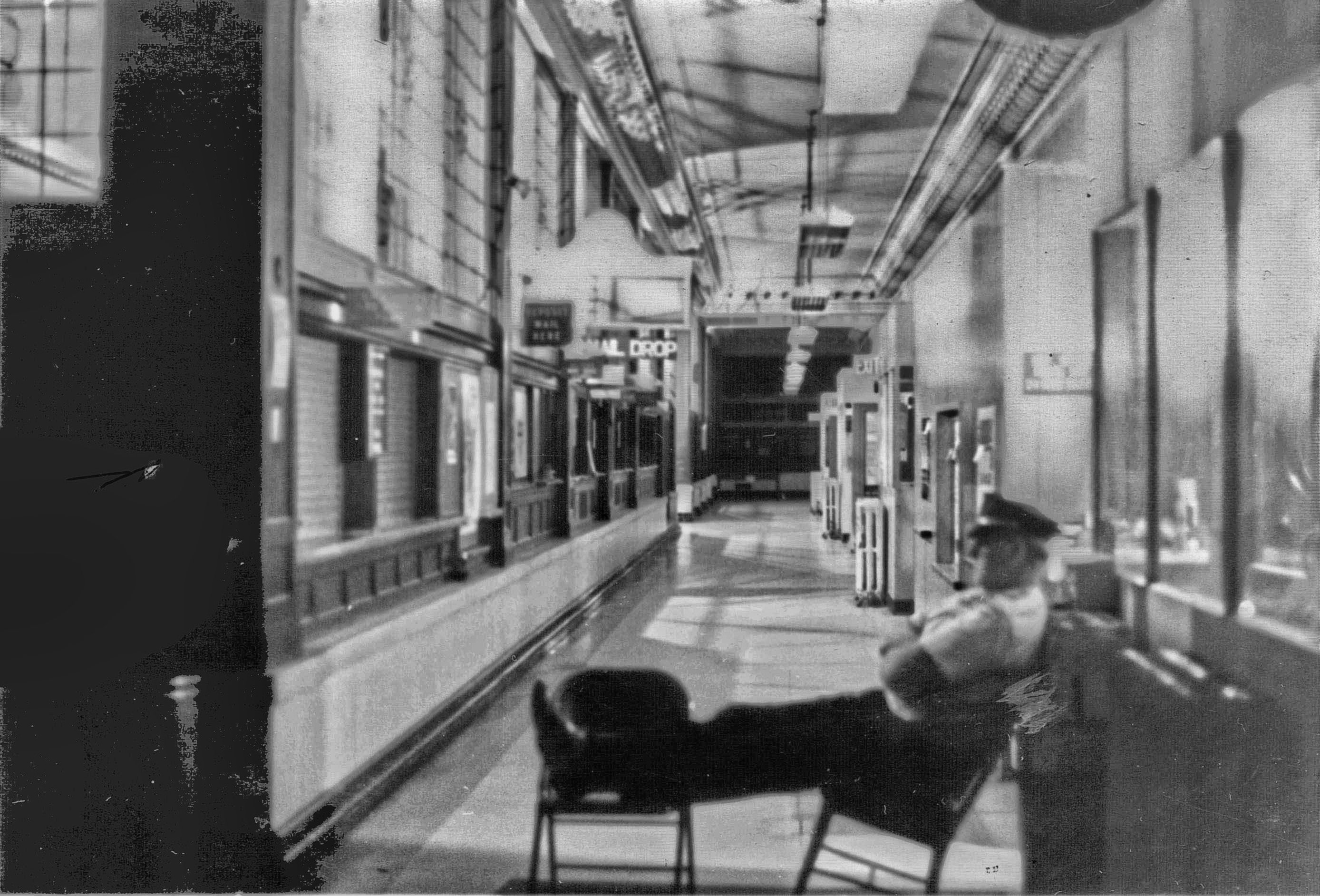
Lewis F. Powell Jr. United States Courthouse, first floor Post Office lobby 1972

The courthouse is one of only two buildings in the historic core of Richmond to survive the devastating 1865 fire that marked the evacuation of the Confederate Army during the last days of the Civil War. It is the oldest courthouse in GSA's inventory. Constructed as the U.S. Custom House, Post Office and Courthouse, the original portion of the building was completed in 1858 to designs of Ammi B. Young, then Supervising Architect of the U.S. Treasury Department. The building received additions that were completed in 1889, 1912, and 1932, all three of which hewed closely to the imposing Italianate forms that characterized the original building.

The building played a significant role in the American Civil War when the Congress of the new Confederate States of America selected Richmond as its capital. The courthouse provided offices for Confederate President Jefferson Davis. Following the conflict, the federal government reoccupied the building. Then, in 1866, the Grand Jury of the United States District Court met on the third floor and indicted Davis for treason. Davis returned to the courthouse in 1867 for a hearing, but was granted amnesty and never stood trial.

Pressure to enlarge the courthouse began in the first decade of the 20th century, when the antitrust policies of President Theodore Roosevelt and associated legislation created an expansion of judicial oversight. In 1910, construction began on a massive expansion of the courthouse, which increased the size of the original building twelve-fold. Matching wings on the east and west were constructed between 1910 and 1932. An Art Deco Annex was constructed in 1935–36 adjacent to the courthouse.

In 1993, by which time the building housed only judicial functions, President Bill Clinton dedicated the building as the Lewis F. Powell Jr. United States Courthouse in honor of the retired Associate Justice of the U.S. Supreme Court Lewis F. Powell Jr., a native Virginian.

== Architecture ==
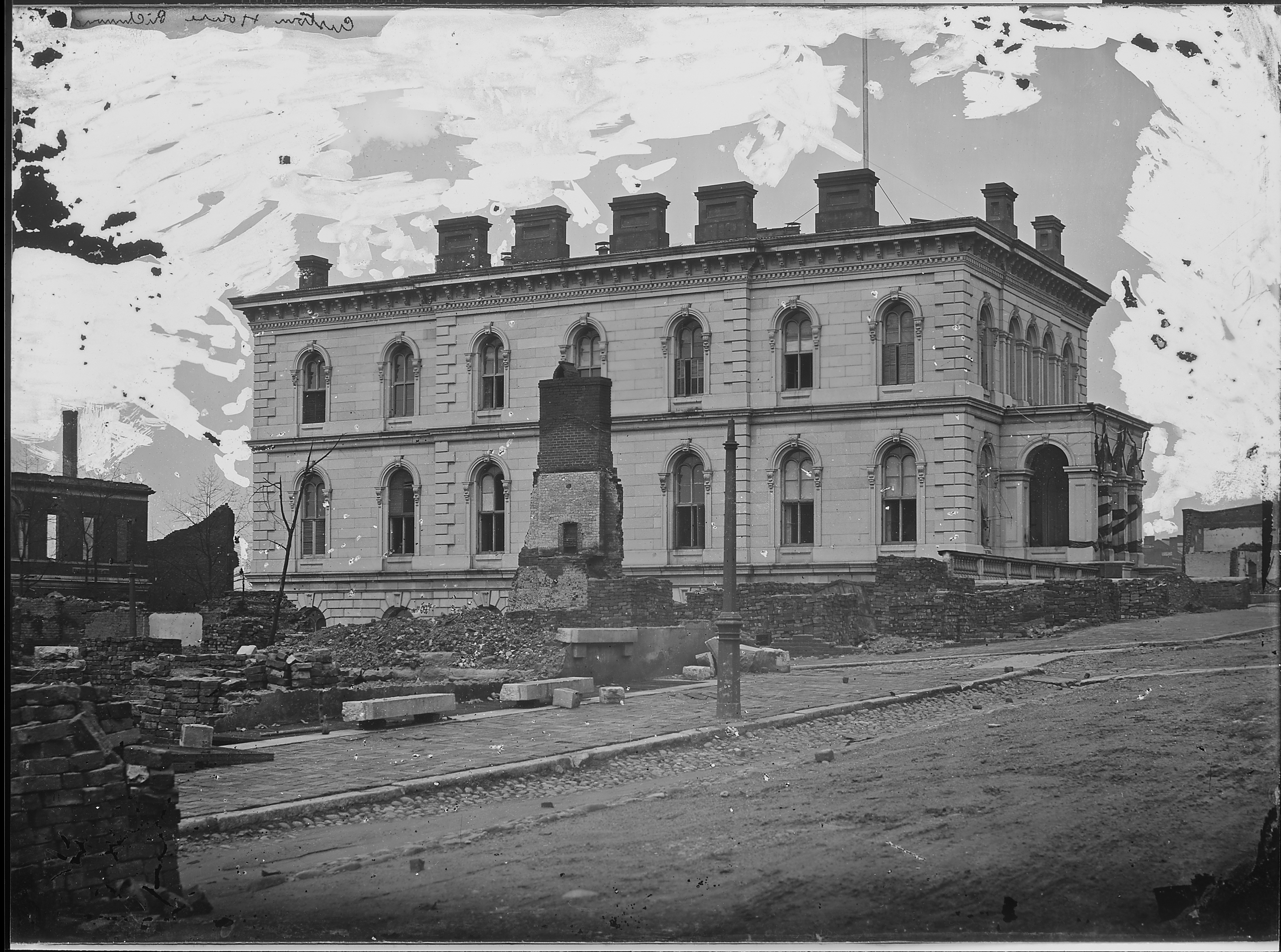
Custom house following the Evacuation Fire of 1865.

The building is an impressive example of the Italianate architecture that became popular in this country during the third quarter of the 19th century. Originally sited in the middle of the block between Tenth and Eleventh Streets, the two primary facades of the courthouse faced Main and Bank streets. Constructed between 1855 and 1858, the original block of the courthouse was designed by Supervising Architect of the U.S. Treasury Department Ammi B. Young. Five round arches formed an arcade marking the entrance on Main Street, and a heavy granite portico of three arches, reached by three granite steps, fronted the Bank Street entrance, which was set back from the property line. The three-story exterior of the courthouse was clad in ashlar granite on the first floor and ashlar limestone on the second and third floors. The remaining elements of the original construction can still be seen on the lower levels of the Bank and Main street facades, including the Main Street arcade and the Bank Street portico.

The Courthouse exhibits an early use of iron as a structural material in a federal building. As noted in a letter from Secretary of the Treasury James Guthrie, the use of "wrought iron beams and girders" in federal building construction at that time was "wholly new." The structural system employed groin vaults to support upper floors, with cast-iron columns supporting beams and girders.

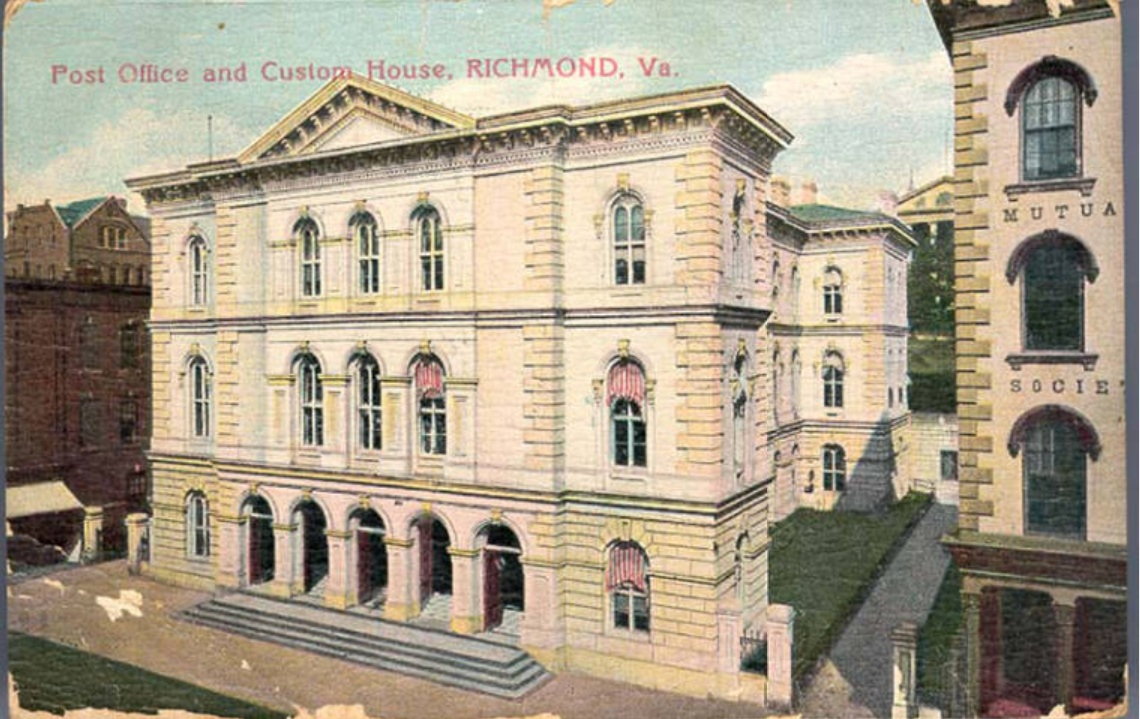
U.S. Custom House & Post Office, 1887-89 Main Street View

The 1887–89 additions to the building, completed under the direction of Supervising Architect Mifflin E. Bell, consisted of one-by-one-bay wings attached to each of the building's corners, giving the courthouse an I-shaped plan. The Bank Street facade, including its portico, was moved forward to the property line, and a classical pediment added to the Main Street entrance.

Federal courts expanded the range of their oversight at the beginning of the twentieth century, requiring an expansion of court facilities. The Richmond courthouse was enlarged in 1910–12 and 1930–32, expanding to fill the entire city block. Once again the designs emanated from the Office of the Supervising Architect under James Knox Taylor for the earlier addition, and under James A. Wetmore for the latter. The enlargement called for demolition of the courthouse interiors, the addition of a fourth floor and expansion to Tenth and Eleventh streets. While maintaining the general features of the original design, stylistic changes evolved in the additions: the cornice was extended along Bank and Main streets with restrained classical motifs to encompass the new wings, and the Italianate windows were replaced with windows featuring semicircular transoms. So precisely was the work carried out that today it is nearly impossible to distinguish between the four phases of construction.

The courthouse was listed in the National Register of Historic Places in 1969. By 1991, the U.S. Postal Service had vacated the building and only judicial functions remained. The courts undertook a master plan for the renovation and preservation of some of the most significant spaces within the original building, hoping to restore the finishes to their 1858 appearance. The first phase of the work, which took place in 1996–99, included the restoration of a part of the Greek Revival Main Street Lobby and office space on the third floor.

== Significant events ==
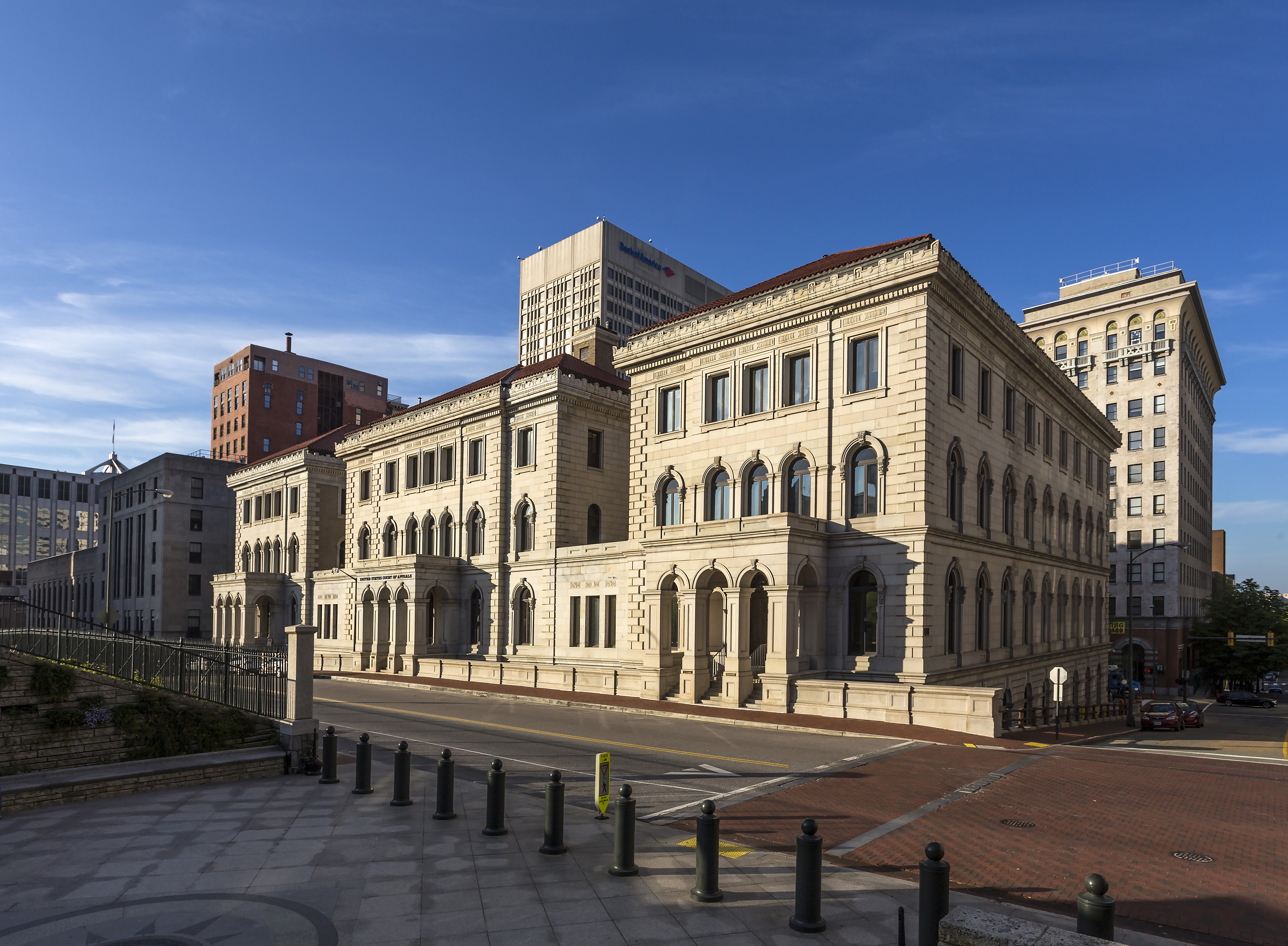
The courthouse from Bank Street at the foot of the Virginia Capitol grounds

- 1855–1858: The Custom House, Post Office and Courthouse is constructed to designs produced in Office of Supervising Architect of the U.S. Treasury Department, headed by Ammi B. Young.
- 1887–89: One-story wings are added at building corners under direction of Supervising Architect Mifflin E. Bell.
- 1910–12; 1930–32: The courthouse is expanded to fill the entire block.
- 1969: The building is listed in the National Register of Historic Places.
- 1991: The U.S. Postal Service vacates the building.
- 1993: President William J. Clinton dedicates the courthouse as the Lewis F. Powell Jr. U.S. Courthouse, after the former Associate Justice of the Supreme Court.
- 1996–99: The Main Street Lobby and third floor offices undergo renovation.

== Building facts ==
- Architects: Ammi B. Young; Mifflin E. Bell; James Knox Taylor; James A. Wetmore
- Construction Dates: 1855–58; 1887–89; 1910–12; 1930–32
- Landmark Status: Listed in the National Register of Historic Places
- Location: 1000 East Main Street
- Architectural Style: Italianate
- Primary Materials: Steel, granite, and limestone
- Prominent Features: Bank Street porticoes, restored Main Street lobby, 1910 Courtrooms
