= Richmond Vampire =

Urban legend from Richmond, Virginia, USA

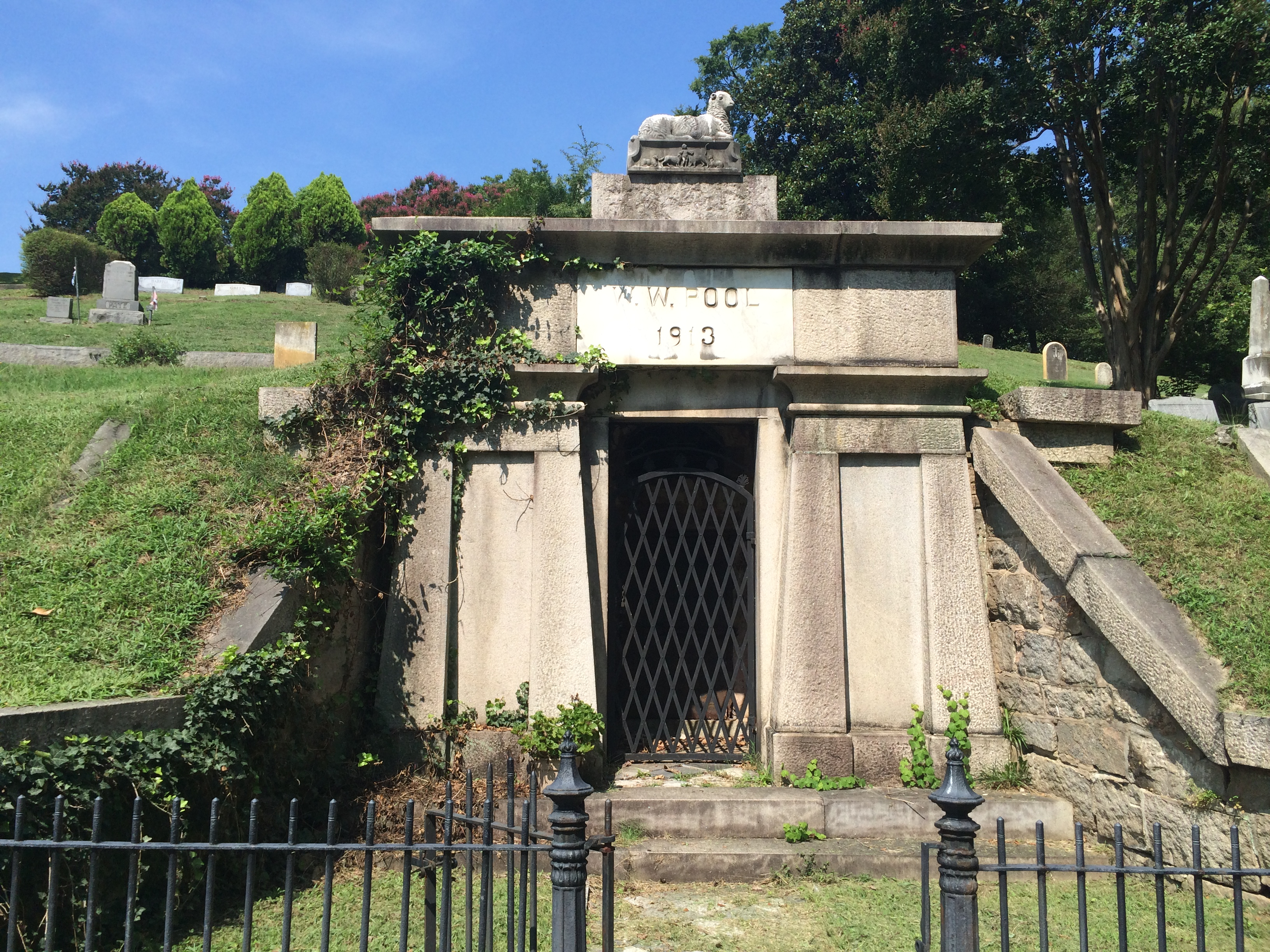
William Wortham Pool's grave in Hollywood Cemetery

The Richmond Vampire (also called locally the Hollywood Vampire) is an urban legend from Richmond, Virginia.

Local residents claim that the mausoleum of W. W. Pool (Dated 1913) in Hollywood Cemetery holds the remains of a vampire. Supposedly Pool was run out of England in the 19th century for being a vampire. Oral legends to this effect were circulating by the 1960s. They may be influenced by the architecture of the tomb, which has both Masonic and ancient Egyptian elements, and double Ws looking like fangs. Because this cemetery is adjacent to Virginia Commonwealth University, the story became popular among students, especially from the 1980s onward. It was first mentioned in print in the student newspaper Commonwealth Times in 1976.

== The Church Hill Tunnel ==
Since 2001, the vampire story has been combined with the collapse of the Chesapeake and Ohio Railroad's Church Hill Tunnel under Church Hill, a neighborhood of eastern Richmond, Virginia, which buried several workers on Friday, October 2, 1925. This part of the story did not show up online until 2001 and was first reported in print in 2007 in Haunted Richmond: The Shadows of Shockoe. It is absent from earlier accounts.

According to this newer story, the tunneling awakened an ancient evil that lived under Church Hill and brought the tunnel crashing down on the workers. Rescue teams found an unearthly blood-covered creature with jagged teeth and skin hanging from its muscular body crouching over one of the victims. The creature escaped from the cave-in and raced toward the James River. Pursued by a group of men, the creature took refuge in Hollywood Cemetery (2.2 miles away), where it disappeared in a mausoleum built into a hillside bearing the name W. W. Pool.

According to Gregory Maitland, an urban legend and folklore researcher with the paranormal research groups Night Shift and the Virginia Ghosts & Haunting Research Society, the "creature" that escaped the tunnel collapse was actually the 28-year-old railroad fireman, Benjamin F. Mosby (1896-1925), who had been shoveling coal into the firebox of a steam locomotive of a work train with no shirt on when the cave-in occurred and the boiler ruptured. Mosby's upper body was horribly scalded and several of his teeth were broken before he made his way through the opening of the tunnel. Witnesses reported he was in shock and layers of his skin were hanging from his body. He died later at Grace Hospital and was buried at Hollywood Cemetery.

Contemporary written records do not include any of these alleged details. Mosby's obituary simply says that he "was fatally scalded when the C. & O. tunnel under Jefferson Park caved in" and died "Friday night at 11:40 o'clock at Grace Hospital".

== See also ==
- List of vampires in folklore and mythology
