= Morson's Row =

Historic houses in Virginia, United States

- U.S. National Register of Historic Places
- Virginia Landmarks Register
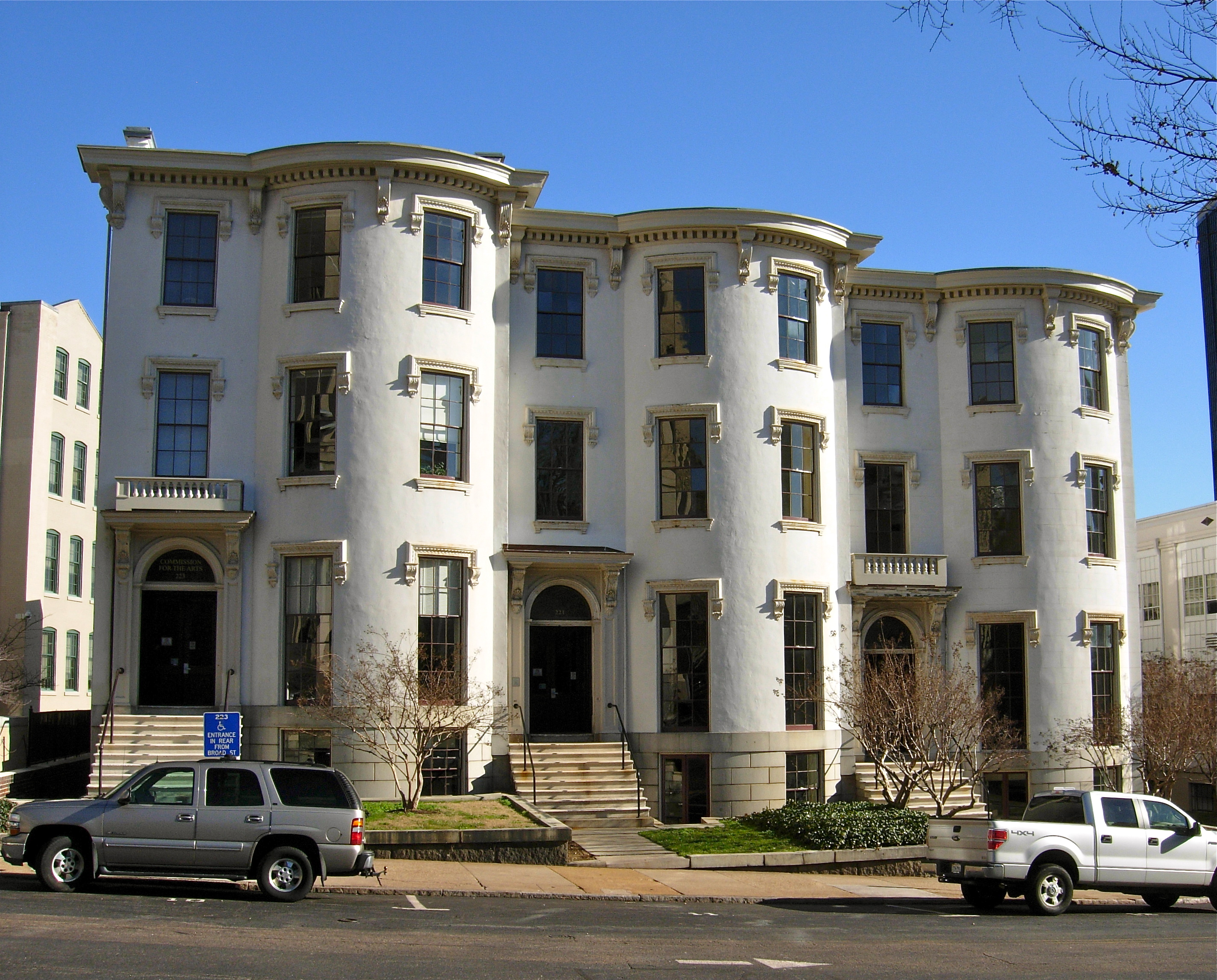
- Morson's Row, January 2012

- Location within Virginia Location within the United States
- Location: 219-223 Governor St., Richmond, Virginia
- Coordinates: 37°32′17″N 77°25′54″W
- Area: 0.2 acres (0.081 ha)
- Built: 1853
- Architectural style: Italianate
- NRHP reference No.: 69000354
- VLR No.: 127-0079

Significant dates
- Added to NRHP: June 11, 1969
- Designated VLR: November 5, 1968

Morson's Row, also known as James Morson's Row, is a set of three historic rowhouses located in Richmond, Virginia. They were built in 1853, and are three-story, three bay brick structures with flat roofs. They feature Italianate style heavy bracketed cornices, arched door enframements, and elaborately molded consoled lintel over the windows. The distinctive feature of the row is the off-center, two-bay bow on each house.

It was listed on the National Register of Historic Places in 1969.

In 2022 Morson’s Row was renamed Reid’s Row, honoring the first African American Virginia lawmaker elected in the 20th century, William Ferguson Reid.
