= Edward E. Lane =

American politician (1924–2009)

Member of the Virginia House of Delegates from the 33rd district
- In office January 13, 1954 – January 11, 1978
- Preceded by: Charles H. Phillips
- Succeeded by: James S. Christian Jr.

Personal details
- Born: Edward Emerson Lee; January 28, 1924 Richmond, Virginia, U.S.
- Died: August 19, 2009 (aged 85) Richmond, Virginia, U.S.
- Resting place: Hollywood Cemetery
- Party: Democratic
- Spouse: Jean Wiltshire (m. 1944)
- Children: 2
- Education: Virginia Tech; University of Richmond School of Law (LLB)
- Occupation: Lawyer; politician

Military service
- Branch/service: United States Army; Army Air Forces
- Years of service: 1943‍–‍1946
- Battles/wars: World War II; Pacific theater

Edward Emerson Lane (January 28, 1924 – August 19, 2009) was a Virginia lawyer and politician. As a Democrat, Lane represented Richmond, Virginia (and for a limited time parts of surrounding Henrico County) in the Virginia House of Delegates from 1954 until 1978, and also was his party's (unsuccessful) candidate for Attorney General of Virginia in 1977.

== Early and family life ==
Born in Richmond, Virginia to Edward T. Lane and his wife, the former Keren Vick, Edward Lane was educated in the city's segregated public schools, including Thomas Jefferson High School, during the Great Depression. He had a younger brother Richard who would survive him, as would his wife and sons. Lane attended Virginia Tech and earned a bachelor's degree.

In 1943, Lane enlisted as a private in the United States Army Air Forces, having listed his job status as unemployed during the draft registration process. He served as a pilot during World War II and earned the benefits of the GI Bill. He then attended the University of Richmond School of Law, and received a LL.B. degree.

He married (Bettie) Jean Wiltshire in Richmond on July 14, 1944. They had two sons, Edward E. Lane Jr. and Gregory T. Lane, both of whom remained in the Richmond area. Lane was active in his church (eventually as vestryman of St. Stephen's Episcopal Church) and with the Boy Scouts of America (serving as president of the R.E. Lee Council by 1960), as well as the business and professional organizations described below.

== Career ==
Not long after his admission to the Virginia bar in 1949, Lane began his public political career, as the Massive Resistance crisis in Virginia politics began. He was active in the local Democratic Party and the Jaycees, which gave Lane a distinguished service award in 1952. Voters first elected Lane to the Virginia House of Delegates in 1953, when he was 28, and re-elected him multiple times until he declined to seek re-election in 1977 but instead ran for Attorney General (and lost). Early in his legislative career, Lane became involved in the Potomac River Commission and served as chairman of the Educational Television Commission.

However, Lane was one of many members of a multi-member district, which eventually was numbered, but the number changed from District 60 in the 1962 election, to District 59 beginning in the 1964 election, and would become the 33rd during the 1970s. Redistricting occurred several times—both due to U.S. federal census results, and as a result of the U.S. Supreme Court's adoption of one-man, one-vote requirements equalizing district size (which had varied greatly in Virginia before Reynolds v. Sims and Davis v. Mann), and eventually Virginia adopted single-member districts.

Initially, Lane won election as one of seven members (all Democrats) representing Richmond in Virginia's House of Delegates. He served in the part-time position alongside fellow lawyer George E. Allen, Jr. for many years. During his initial term the other Richmond delegates included: W. Moscoe Huntley, Fred G. Pollard, W. Griffith Purcell, Eugene B. Sydnor Jr. and J. Randolph Tucker, Jr. FitzGerald Bemiss soon replaced Sydnor, and in 1956 E. Tucker Carlton replaced Huntley. Then in 1958 Harold H. Dervishian and Thomas N. Parker Jr. replaced`Purcell and Tucker, and in 1960 T. Coleman Andrews Jr. and David E. Satterfield III replaced Bemiss (who won election to the Virginia Senate) and Parker.

In 1964, legislative redistricting combined Richmond with part of Henrico County as the 59th district and gained another seat. Thus, Junie L. Bradshaw, and Republicans Louis S. Herrink Jr. and S. Strother Smith Jr. joined the delegation as Satterfield and Parker left. Further changes came in 1966, as voters elected E. B. Pendleton, Jr., J. Sargeant Reynolds and T. Dix Sutton to the delegation, both Republicans failed to win re-election and Pollard won election as Lieutenant Governor of Virginia). Richmond's delegation changed further after the 1967 election, with Reynolds winning election to the Virginia Senate to replace Bemiss and only Lane and Allen remaining from the previous decade, and Junie L. Bradshaw and E.B. Pendleton Jr. were the only other veterans. Thomas P. Bryan, Ernst W. Farley Jr., William Ferguson Reid and former Richmond mayor Eleanor Parker Sheppard rounded out the Richmond delegation as the turbulent 1960s ended. In the 1970 legislative session, Carl E. Bain and B. Earl Dunn`replaced Bryan and Pendleton in Richmond's delegation. After the reapportionment preceding the 1971 election, Richmond City only had five delegates: Lane, Allen, Bain, Sheppard and Philip B. Morris won the seats, although William Ferguson Reid was elected from a district encompassing Henrico County and Richmond City, and T. Dix Sutton, Robert B. Ball Sr. and Edwin H. Ragsdale represented Henrico County in another district. In 1974, Richmond City's delegation remained at 5 members, with Walter H. Emroch replacing Bain. The 1976 delegation included new members Franklin P. Hall and Richard S. Reynolds, as Emroch and Morris either left or failed to make the cut.

A conservative, Lane had initially supported the Byrd Organization, guided by future governor Mills Godwin (the last member of the Byrd Organization to win that office, in 1973). During the Massive Resistance crisis of the 1950s, Lane voted for legislation allowing the governor (then Thomas B. Stanley) to close schools rather than allow their desegregation pursuant to court order. When federal courts and the Virginia Supreme Court invalidated first the overt aspects of Massive Resistance such as the Stanley Plan, and the United States Supreme Court later required equal size legislative districts in Davis v. Mann, Lane evolved. He later expressed regret for his previous support of Massive Resistance.

In 1977, Lane (who had been the most popular among Richmond's delegates in the previous election) became the Democratic Party's candidate for Attorney General of Virginia on an eclectic ticket with long-time desegregation advocate Henry Howell as the party's gubernatorial candidate and moderate Chuck Robb as the candidate for Lieutenant Governor (and the only one of the three who won in the general election). Lane had won the divisive Democratic primary with 35% of the vote over Delegates John L. Melnick of Arlington and Erwin S. Solomon of Hot Springs and attorney John T. Schell of McLean. However, Lane lost the general election to Republican J. Marshall Coleman, who stressed Lane's role during Massive Resistance, and some noted that many African-American voters refused to vote for Lane.

Lane consistently supported development in Richmond through business associations such as the Central Richmond Association and the Commonwealth Club, as well as through his legislative activities. Lane served as chairman of the powerful House Appropriations Committee from 1973 to 1978, and also served on the Rules Committee and the Committee on Corporations, Insurance and Banking, and was the first chairman of the Joint Legislative Audit and Review Commission. Delegate Lane also supported funding projects in Richmond, including the Virginia Museum of Fine Arts (on whose board he served), the Library of Virginia, Virginia Commonwealth University, the Richmond office of the Virginia Employment Commission and the VCU Massey Cancer Center (on whose board he also served).

== Death and legacy ==
Lane suffered from Parkinson's disease in his final years and died in 2009, survived by his widow, sons and grandchildren. After a service at St. Stephen's Episcopal Church, he was interred at Hollywood Cemetery.
