= Eleanor P. Sheppard =

American civic activist and politician

Eleanor Parker Sheppard

Member of the Virginia House of Delegates from Richmond
- In office January 10, 1968 – January 11, 1978 Serving with Edward E. Lane, George E. Allen, Jr., Philip B. Morris, Carl E. Bain, Walter H. Emroch, Franklin P. Hall, William Ferguson Reid, Richard S. Reynolds
- Preceded by: Harold H. Dervishian
- Succeeded by: Walter H. Emroch

66th Mayor of Richmond, Virginia
- In office July 1, 1962 – June 30, 1964
- Preceded by: Claude W. Woodward
- Succeeded by: Morrill Martin Crowe

Personal details
- Born: Eleanor Parker; July 24, 1907 Pelham, Georgia, U.S.
- Died: March 13, 1991 (aged 83) Richmond, Virginia, U.S.
- Party: Democratic
- Spouse: Thomas E. Sheppard (m. 1928; died 1987)
- Children: 2
- Education: Limestone College

Eleanor Parker Sheppard (July 24, 1907 – March 13, 1991) was an American civic activist and Democratic politician who became the first woman to be elected to the city council of Richmond, Virginia, and later became her adopted city's first female mayor, then represented its citizens in the Virginia General Assembly for a decade.

== Early and family life ==
Eleanor Parker was born in Pelham, Mitchell County, Georgia, on July 24, 1907, the first-born child of John W. Parker and his wife, Eleanor Parker would eventually have two brothers and two sisters. She attended Limestone College in South Carolina. Her grandfather had been the Dougherty County, Georgia treasurer, and her father had served on the Albany, Georgia city council.

On February 23, 1928, she married fellow Georgian Thomas E. Sheppard, a salesman for Beech Nut Packing Company, at the Headland Missionary Baptist Church in Chambers County, Alabama. Mr. Sheppard's job took them to Atlanta, Georgia, New Orleans, Louisiana and Phoenix, Arizona.

In 1936, they moved to Richmond and settled in what was then the relatively new suburban Ginter Park neighborhood, as development proceeded along the older streetcar line along the Brookland parkway. Their children included Edith Logan Sheppard Ott (1937-2014) and Sally Dunnington, and during World War II his widowed mother Annie also lived with the growing family.

The gregarious Mrs. Sheppard became active in her children's school and the Ginter Park Baptist church, as well as the Business and Professional Women's Club, Soroptimist Club, Colony Club and Ginter Park Woman's Club.

She later received civic honors including the Richmond First Club Good Government Award (1964) and honorary memberships in the Kappa Delta Epsilon and Alpha Delta Kappa sororities, as well as the Richmond Symphony.

Thomas Sheppard died in 1987.

== Career ==
Eleanor P. Sheppard began her civic career as room mother of her daughter's elementary school, then with the Ginter Park Parent Teacher Association (PTA). In 1952, she became president of the Richmond Federation of PTA’s As the prospect of schools being closed to prevent racial desegregation became important, and many awaited the decisions of consolidated cases before the United States Supreme Court that became known as Brown v. Board of Education, Mrs. Sheppard ran for a seat on the Richmond City Council in 1954. She won, and thus became the first woman to serve on that body, and continued to win re-election until resigning in 1968 after winning a seat in the Virginia General Assembly.

Fellow city councillors elected Mrs. Sheppard vice mayor in 1960, and then elected her mayor in 1962. She became the first woman ever elected mayor of an incorporated city in the Commonwealth of Virginia, and a photograph of her adjusting her hat on inauguration day was published worldwide. During her two years as mayor, the city faced turmoil as Massive Resistance continued on the state level. Mrs. Sheppard worked to promote urban renewal through the Richmond Citizens Association (which became Richmond Forward) and helped pave the way for Interstate 95, as well as advocated for healthcare and the city's children.

In 1967, Mrs. Sheppard ran to become one of Richmond's representatives in the Virginia House of Delegates, as J. Sargeant Reynolds ran to represent the city in the Virginia Senate. She won, and voters re-elected her four times. In that 1967 election, prominent segregationist T. Coleman Andrews, Jr., lost, and another seat in Richmond's delegation was won by William Ferguson Reid, who became the first African American to sit in the Virginia House of Delegates since 1891. Mrs. Sheppard soon sponsored a bill to create Virginia Commonwealth University, working with Byrd Organization lieutenant and veteran state senator Lloyd Bird to combine two existing institutions of higher education, the Medical College of Virginia and the Richmond Professional Institute, to create an urban university, which succeeded on March 1, 1968. Following the 1970 census, her district changed to include only the City of Richmond, eliminating parts of neighboring Henrico County.

Although Sheppard never lost an election and described herself as shy and a "milquetoast", after the Equal Rights Amendment to the U.S. Constitution failed to achieve ratification in Virginia in the 1970s, one of her male successors, Philip J. Bagley, Jr., quipped that in Richmond the initials "ERA" came to mean "Eleanor's Running Again."

Sheppard also served on the executive committee of the Central Virginia Educational Television Corporation, and the boards of directors of Metropolitan Richmond YMCA, Richmond Community Mental Health and Mental Retardation Services, Richmond Area Psychiatric Clinic, Junior League Community, Maymont Foundation and as a trustee of the Buford Academy. She also worked with the United Way Human Services Planning Division and the Commission on the Status of Women.

== Death and legacy ==
Thomas Sheppard died on December 20, 1987, just months before their 50th wedding anniversary, but Eleanor Sheppard continued to live for another four years, albeit also suffering a long illness before her death, aged 83, on March 14, 1991.

Virginia Commonwealth University's special collections division received her papers, and the Library of Virginia has made available an audio recording of her condolences to the widow and family of the assassinated President John F. Kennedy.

In 1976, the Richmond School Board named Overby-Sheppard Elementary School to honor her service, as well as that of Ethyl Thompson Overby, one of Richmond's first African American principals.

Virginia House of Delegates
Preceded by J. Sargeant Reynolds	Representing Richmond; 1964–1970	Succeeded by James S. Christian Jr.
Political offices
Preceded by Claude W. Woodward	Mayor of Richmond; 1962–1964	Succeeded by Morrill Martin Crowe
