= J. Sargeant Reynolds =

American politician (1936–1971)

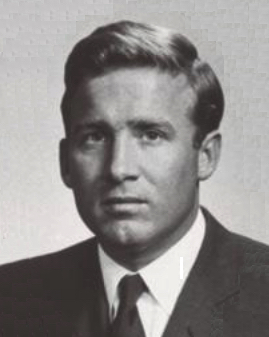
- Official portrait, 1966

30th Lieutenant Governor of Virginia
- In office January 17, 1970 – June 13, 1971
- Governor: Linwood Holton
- Preceded by: Fred G. Pollard
- Succeeded by: Henry Howell

Member of the Virginia Senate from the 30th district
- In office January 10, 1968 – November 12, 1969
- Preceded by: FitzGerald Bemiss
- Succeeded by: L. Douglas Wilder

Member of the Virginia House of Delegates from Richmond City
- In office January 12, 1966 – January 10, 1968
- Preceded by: Fred G. Pollard
- Succeeded by: Thomas P. Bryan

Personal details
- Born: Julian Sargeant Reynolds; June 30, 1936 New York City, U.S.
- Died: June 13, 1971 (aged 34) New York City, U.S.
- Resting place: Reynolds Homestead
- Party: Democratic
- Spouses: Elizabeth Weir Veeneman (m. 1956, divorced); Mary Ballou Handy Stettinius (m. 1969)
- Children: 5
- Parent: R. S. Reynolds Jr. (father)
- Relatives: R. S. Reynolds III (brother)
- Education: University of Pennsylvania

Julian Sargeant "Sarge" Reynolds (June 30, 1936 – June 13, 1971) of Richmond, Virginia, was an American educator, businessman, and Democratic politician. He served in both the House and Senate of the Virginia General Assembly and served as 30th Lieutenant Governor of the Commonwealth of Virginia under Governor Linwood Holton. He died of an inoperable brain tumor at age 34 while in office as Virginia's Lieutenant Governor.

== Early and family life ==
Reynolds was born into wealth in New York City, the second son of Richard Samuel Reynolds Jr. (president and CEO of Reynolds Metals Company) and Virginia McDonald Sargeant Reynolds. His grandfather, Richard S. Reynolds Sr., had invented Reynolds Wrap and founded the metals company. His great-grandfather A.D. Reynolds of Bristol, Tennessee had been a successful tobacco farmer and brother of Richard Joshua Reynolds, who founded the R.J. Reynolds Tobacco Company.

Sarge Reynolds was educated in Richmond, Virginia, attending St. Christopher's School, and graduating from Woodberry Forest School in Orange, Virginia in 1954. He then went to Philadelphia to attend the Wharton School of Finance, University of Pennsylvania. In 1958 he graduated 9th in his class of 356.

He married the former Elizabeth Weir "Betsy" Veeneman of Louisville, Kentucky on September 29, 1956, in Hertford, North Carolina. Before their divorce, they had four children: Virginia (Ginny) Weir, J. Sargeant Jr., Jeanne Elizabeth (Liz) and David Parham Reynolds II (who died less than 2 months after birth). Reynolds then married Mary Ballou Handy Stettinius from Lynchburg, Virginia on November 21, 1969, at Second Presbyterian Church in Richmond. They had one son, Richard Roland Reynolds.

== Career ==
In 1958 Reynolds started his business career in the market research department of the family's Reynolds Metals Company. In 1961 he became assistant treasurer and in 1965 he became executive vice-president of the Reynolds Aluminum Credit Corporation. He also taught economics at the University of Richmond to help him overcome shyness.

== Political career ==
Reynolds began his political career with the Young Democratic Club, as the Byrd Organization struggled with the end of Massive Resistance. Reynolds first ran for elective office in 1965 and was elected as one of eight delegates for Richmond. In that election after the reapportionment required by Davis v. Mann as well as the Civil Rights Act of 1965, incumbents George E. Allen Jr., T. Coleman Andrews Jr., Harold H. Dervishian, Junie L. Bradshaw and Edward E. Lane won re-election, and Reynolds, E. B. Pendleton Jr. and T. Dix Sutton replaced fellow Democrat Fred G. Pollard (who became Lieutenant Governor) as well as Richmond's first elected Republicans in years--Louis S. Herrink Jr. (who moved to King George) and S. Strother Smith Jr. (each of whom had been elected in 1963 and proved one-termers).

Two years later, Reynolds ran for the Virginia State Senate from District 30, again representing Richmond City, Senator FitzGerald Bemiss having retired. Reynolds and incumbent fellow-Democrat Edward E. Willey thus became Richmond's two senators. In the General Assembly, Reynolds advocated establishing the Virginia Community College System. In the 1967 election at which Reynolds moved up to the state senate, among Richmond's eight delegates, half changed. Thomas P. Bryan, Ernest W. Farley Jr., William Ferguson Reid and Richmond's first woman mayor, Republican Eleanor Parker Sheppard replaced Andrews, Dervishian, Reynolds and Sutton.

Virginia's Democratic Party nominated Reynolds to run for Lieutenant Governor against pro-education Republican H. Dunlop Dawbarn in 1969, which proved to be a near-landslide year for Republicans. The Republicans concentrated their efforts on electing Richard Nixon President and Linwood Holton Virginia's governor (who outpolled Democrat William C. Battle), and succeeded with many other offices on the ticket. However, Reynolds broke the tide, polling 54% of the vote for lieutenant governor compared to Dawbarn's 42%, thus winning the 3-way race. In a 1969 special election following Reynolds' resignation from the State Senate, fellow Democrat L. Douglas Wilder (who would later become Virginia's first African-American governor) won election to represent Richmond in the state senate alongside Willey, thus replacing Reynolds.

== Death and legacy ==
Shortly after taking office, Reynolds was diagnosed as having an inoperable brain tumor. Weakened by attempted treatments of the tumor in New York City, Reynolds died of pneumonia. Reynolds asked to be buried at his great-grandfather's boyhood home. Dying in office, he was accorded a state funeral before being buried in accordance with that wish. J. Sargeant Reynolds Community College, which serves Henrico County and metropolitan Richmond, was named in his honor after his death in 1971.

Political offices
Preceded by Fred G. Pollard	Lieutenant Governor of Virginia; 1970–1971	Succeeded by Henry Howell
