= Eugene B. Sydnor Jr. =

American politician

Member of the Virginia Senate from the 34th district
- In office January 11, 1956 – January 13, 1960 Serving with Edward E. Willey and Edward E. Haddock
- Preceded by: Frank S. Richeson
- Succeeded by: FitzGerald Bemiss

Member of the Virginia House of Delegates from Richmond district
- In office January 13, 1954 – January 11, 1956
- Preceded by: William Harrison Adams
- Succeeded by: FitzGerald Bemiss

Personal details
- Born: September 25, 1917 Richmond, Virginia, U.S.
- Died: September 9, 2003 (aged 85) Richmond, Virginia, U.S.
- Party: Democratic
- Spouses: Lucy Harvey (divorced); Elaine Jantzen Wilis
- Education: Princeton University (BA); Harvard University (MBA)

Military service
- Branch/service: United States Navy
- Years of service: 1940‍–‍1945
- Battles/wars: World War II

Eugene Beauharnais Sydnor Jr. (September 25, 1917 – September 9, 2003) was a Richmond department store owner, Chamber of Commerce executive, and politician. A member of the Byrd Organization, Sydnor served briefly in both houses of the Virginia General Assembly: from 1953 to 1955 in the House of Delegates and from 1955 until 1959 in the Virginia Senate. Both occurred during the period of Massive Resistance to the United States Supreme Court's decision in Brown v. Board of Education.

== Early and family life ==
A Richmond native, and son of businessman Eugene B. Sydnor and his wife, the former Sallie Belle Weller, Eugene was educated at St. Christopher's School in Richmond, and had a sister who became Mrs. Charles M. Carr of Williamsburg. Sydnor graduated from Princeton University in 1939 and was a member of Phi Beta Kappa. He then received a Master of Business Administration from the Harvard Business School.

Eugene Sydnor married Lucy Harvey (d. 2006) of Winnetka, Illinois, a graduate of Smith College whom he met during his World War II naval service. They had one daughter (Alice) who predeceased them, and three sons (William H., Eugene Jr. and Charles). Lucy Sydnor had a particular interest in historic preservation and served on the Board of Directors for the Association for the Preservation of Virginia Antiquities from 1970 until 1982. The couple had primarily lived in Richmond, but acquired a property in Charles City County, Dancing Pointe, on which they commissioned an archeological survey as discussed below, and where they ultimately constructed a postmodern house which they used on weekends and which Lucy Sydnor gained in the divorce. Sydnor later married Elaine Jantzen Willis, and she and her two daughters and three sons also survived him.

== Military career ==
During World War II, Sydnor served in the United States Navy aboard three destroyers, last holding the position of First Lieutenant.

== Career ==
Sydnor was the president and significant stockholder of Southern Department Stores (now defunct but then with 20 retail locations in Virginia and North Carolina, including in Williamsburg, Gloucester, Petersburg, Rappahannock and Kilmarnock). In 1951, the National Labor Relations Board ruled against the family's Richmond Dry Goods Co., which was the target of unionization efforts. In 1956, he spun that company off to Philip Whitlock Klaus, who had founded it with Sydnor's father.

Sydnor became president of the Richmond Better Business Bureau and the Virginia Retail Merchants Association, vice president of the board of the National Retail Merchants Association and of the U.S. Chamber of Commerce's Southeastern Division. He was also a director of the State-Planters Bank of Commerce and Trusts in Richmond and of the Richmond Dry Goods Co.

As Education Director for the U.S. Chamber of Commerce, Sydnor gained nationwide recognition in connection with a 1971 memorandum from his neighbor, then Richmond attorney Lewis F. Powell Jr. concerning perceived attacks on the U.S. business system.

His charitable activities included service as a trustee of the Richmond Area Community Chest and Virginia Museum of Fine Arts (to which he also donated several works), as well as vice president of the American Red Cross's Richmond chapter.

== Political career ==
Sydnor served in the Virginia House of Delegates from 1953 until 1955, as one of the city's seven delegates. In that election, W. Moscoe Huntley, Fred G. Pollard, W. Griffith Purcell and J. Randolph Tucker Jr. were re-elected, but Sydnor, George E. Allen Jr and Edward E. Lane replaced William H. Adams, Albert Orlando Boschen and Charles H. Phillips.

When Senator Frank S. Richeson died on December 31, 1954, Sydnor replaced him and won the senatorial seat in his own right in that election. He thus represented Richmond in the Virginia Senate as one of three senators representing the city (along with Edward E. Willey and Edward E. Haddock, with fellow St. Christopher's alumnus FitzGerald Bemiss replacing him in the House of Delegates). In 1957, a commission which Sydnor chaired studied industrial policy in Virginia. Late the following year, Sydnor was among the 29 businessmen approaching Governor J. Lindsay Almond, Lieutenant Governor Gi Stevens, Attorney General Albertis Harrison and other officials, warning them of the toll the Byrd Organization's policy of Massive Resistance was having upon the Commonwealth's business community. Sydnor did not seek re-election in 1959 (the first year in which the senatorial districts were numbered), and Bemiss also succeeded him in the Virginia Senate representing Richmond along with Haddock and Willey.

As a state senator, Sydnor sponsored the bill creating the State Council on Higher Education in 1959. He became the first chairman of the State Technical Education Board, as well as the first chairman of the State Board for Community Colleges (in 1966).

Sydnor also served on the Virginia Commission on Constitutional Government, and the Governor's Industrial Development Advisory Board. He also opposed creation of two expressways which divided Richmond, and in one of his last public expressions in 1980, advocated eliminating tolls on those roads.

== Death and legacy ==
Eugene Sydnor died in Richmond in 2003, survived by his widow and stepdaughters, as well as his ex-wife and their children.

In the 1969, Eugene and Lucy Sydnor had acquired an estate at "Dancing Point" in Charles City County overlooking the confluence of the James and Chickahominy Rivers. They allowed an archeological survey in 1982. That confirmed that indigenous people had lived in the area for centuries, as well as that English colonists first settled there in 1617, naming it "Smith's Hundred" and renaming it "Southampton Hundred" circa 1620. Although five settlers died in the Massacre of 1622, it became a private plantation by the 1630s, and part of the Lightfoot family's Sandy Point plantation by that century's end (although they built their main house, Tedlington, about 1.5 miles upstream) and it continued under Lightfoot ownership until 1810. Because it remains in private ownership and contains significant historical artifacts of both indigenous peoples and colonial settlers, access is restricted. The Sydnors hired architect Robert Welton Steward of Richmond and California-based landscape architect Thomas Dolliver Church to design a post-modern house and gardens. Lucy gained ownership of what had been the family's weekend residence during their divorce in the 1980s and expanded the property by purchasing an additional 92 acres. She continued to live there until her death in 2006. The postmodern house and landscape were restored in 2015 and placed on the Virginia Landmarks register and the National Register of Historic Places in April 2016. It is occasionally open for tours. Development as a spiritual retreat or conference center was contemplated.

The family's department store chain is defunct, not surviving competition from mass market retailers. In March, 1999, the family store in Williamsburg, run by his son Charles, requested bankruptcy court protection, in part due to ice storm damage.

The scholarship at the University of Richmond's Evening Division was established in 1915 to honor his father, who founded the Richmond Dry Goods Co. and as president of the Richmond Chamber of Commerce had helped found Shenandoah National Park in the 1920s.
