= 1946 United States Senate election in Virginia =

- November 5, 1946
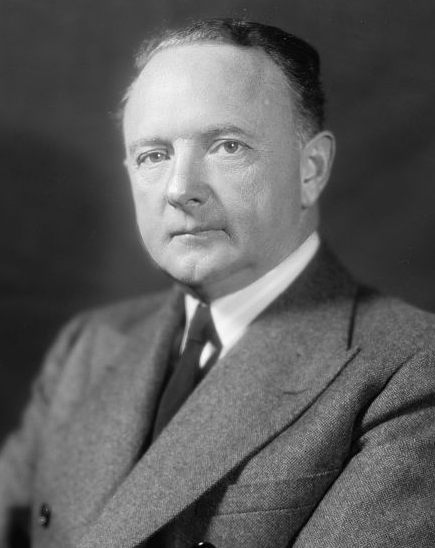

Nominee	Harry F. Byrd Sr.	Lester S. Parsons
Party	Democratic	Republican
Popular vote	163,960	77,005
Percentage	64.84%	30.45%
- County and independent city results Byrd: 40–50% 50–60% 60–70% 70–80% 80–90% 90–100% Parsons: 40–50% 50–60%
U.S. senator before election
Harry F. Byrd Sr.
Democratic
Elected U.S. Senator
Harry F. Byrd Sr.
Democratic

The 1946 United States Senate election in Virginia was held on November 5, 1946. Incumbent Senator Harry F. Byrd was re-elected to a fourth term after defeating Republican Lester S. Parsons.

The first Virginia primary for United States Senate was held on August 6. Byrd defeated challenger Martin A. Hutchinson.

== Democratic primary ==
=== Candidates ===
- Harry F. Byrd, incumbent Senator since 1933
- Martin A. Hutchinson

=== Results ===
1946 Democratic U.S. Senate primary
Party	Candidate	Votes	%
Democratic	Harry F. Byrd (incumbent)	141,923	63.49%
Democratic	Martin A. Hutchinson	81,605	36.51%
Total votes		223,528	100.00%

== General election ==
=== Candidates ===
- Thomas E. Boorde (Prohibition)
- Alice Burke (Communist)
- Harry F. Byrd, incumbent Senator since 1933 (Democratic)
- Howard Carwile, Richmond trial lawyer and government watchdog (Independent)
- Lester S. Parsons (Republican)
- Clarke T. Robb (Socialist)

=== Results ===
United States Senate election in Virginia, 1946
Party	Candidate	Votes	%	±%
Democratic	Harry F. Byrd, Sr. (inc.)	163,960	64.84%	−28.48%
Republican	Lester S. Parsons	77,005	30.45%	+30.45%
Independent	Howard Carwile	5,189	2.05%	
Communist	Alice Burke	3,318	1.31%	−1.50%
Prohibition	Thomas E. Boorde	1,764	0.70%	+0.70%
Socialist	Clarke T. Robb	1,592	0.63%	+0.63%
Write-ins		35	0.01%	−0.06%
Majority		86,955	34.39%	−55.14%
Turnout		252,863		
Democratic hold				

== See also ==
- 1946 United States Senate elections
