= Senator Sydnor =

Senator Sydnor may refer to:

- Charles E. Sydnor III (born 1974), Maryland State Senate
- Eugene B. Sydnor Jr. (1917–2003), Virginia State Senate
