= FitzGerald Bemiss =

American politician (1922–2011)

Member of the Virginia Senate from the Richmond district
- In office January 12, 1960 – January 1967
- Preceded by: Eugene B. Sydnor Jr.
- Succeeded by: J. Sargeant Reynolds

Member of the Virginia House of Delegates from the Richmond district
- In office November 30, 1955 – January 1960
- Preceded by: Eugene B. Sydnor Jr.
- Succeeded by: T. Coleman Andrews Jr.

Personal details
- Born: October 2, 1922 Richmond, Virginia, U.S.
- Died: February 7, 2011 (aged 88) Richmond, Virginia, U.S.
- Resting place: Hollywood Cemetery
- Party: Democratic; Republican
- Spouse: Margaret Reid Page
- Children: 1 son, 1 daughter
- Relatives: Robert Williams Daniel, uncle, Robert Daniel, cousin
- Education: University of Virginia
- Occupation: Politician, businessman, philanthropist

FitzGerald Bemiss, also known as Gerry Bemiss, (October 2, 1922 – February 7, 2011) was an American businessman and philanthropist who also served in the Virginia General Assembly, representing the City of Richmond, Virginia, in first the House of Delegates, and later the Senate.

== Early and family life ==
FitzGerald Bemiss was born on October 2, 1922, in Richmond, Virginia to Samuel Merrifield Bemiss and Dorothy FitzGerald Bemiss. He had one sister Cynthia Bemiss Stuart) and was educated at St. Christopher's School and the Woodberry Forest School. He attended the University of Virginia for two years, leaving to volunteer for military service after the Japanese attack on Pearl Harbor. In 1981, he received the university's Raven Award for his public service discussed below, and an honorary degree from his alma mater in 1983.

During World War II, Bemiss served in the United States Navy on destroyers during the Battle of the Atlantic. In 1953 he married Margaret Reid Page. They had a son, Samuel M. Bemiss III, and a daughter, Margaret Wickham Bemiss.

Bemiss was a nephew of Titanic survivor Robert Williams Daniel and a cousin of five term U.S. Congressman Robert Daniel.

== Career ==
Bemiss, a wealthy businessman was a conservative Democrat who initially was part of the Byrd Organization, but later joined the Republican Party in the 1950s when many Southern Democrats dissatisfied with the policies of desegregation enacted during the administration of Democratic President Harry Truman left the party. While serving part-time in the General Assembly as discussed below, Bemiss was vice-president of FitzGerald and Company (a family business), but ultimately resigned that legislative position because of his responsibilities as the president of Virginia Skyline Co. (another family business, that operated concessions along Skyline Drive through Shenandoah National Park and the Blue Ridge Mountains in Virginia). Bemiss also served on the Board of Directors of State Planters Bank (and its successors United Virginia Bank and Crestar Bank) from 1963 until 1992, and on the James River Paper Company board from 1972 until 1995.

Bemiss chaired Republican presidential candidate Dwight D. Eisenhower's campaign in Virginia.

Bemiss served as a member of the Virginia House of Delegates representing the City of Richmond from 1955 to 1959 during the Massive Resistance crisis. He replaced Eugene B. Sydnor Jr., who had replaced Frank S. Richeson (who died on December 31, 1954) and won the senatorial seat in his own right in that election. Bemiss was appointed first to the Gray Commission, which had been created to respond to the U.S. Supreme Court's decisions overturning racial segregation in public schools. He was skeptical of its attempts to close schools that complied with desegregation orders, which the General Assembly later adopted as part of the Stanley Plan. After both the Virginia Supreme Court and a three-judge federal panel on January 19, 1959 (Robert E. Lee's birthday, a state holiday in Virginia) found the Stanley Plan unconstitutional, Bemiss served on the Perrow Commission. After his resignation to serve in the state Senate, Richmond's seven-member delegation changed with T. Coleman Andrews Jr. and David E. Satterfield III taking office on January 13, 1960, replacing Bemiss and Thomas N. Parker Jr.

In the general election of 1959, Bemiss won election to the Senate of Virginia, again replacing Sydnor and where he served two terms. Bemiss initially represented Richmond City (District 34)together with Edward E. Haddock and Edward E. Willey initially from 1960 to 1967. After the 1963 elections (with a contested reapportionment in 1962 eventually litigated as Davis v. Mann), Bemiss and Edward E. Willey represented Richmond City in District 33, which became District 30 in the session that convened in January 1966. He was replaced by fellow Democrat J. Sargeant Reynolds.

After retiring from the legislature, Bemiss accepted appointments to the Virginia Tax Study Commission, the Metropolitan Areas Commission and the Commission for Virginia's Future. President Ronald Reagan appointed Bemiss to the National Advisory Committee on Oceans and Atmosphere, and President George H. W. Bush (a personal friend since childhood) appointed him Vice Chairman of the Board of the United States Naval Academy.

== Philanthropy ==
A longtime supporter of ecological and historic conservation in Virginia, Bemiss beginning in 1965 served as Chairman of the Virginia Outdoor Recreation Study Commission (which developed a comprehensive plan for Virginia's natural and historic resources under Governor Albertis Harrison). He advocated conservation and open space easements as well as other tax subsidies to preserve ecological and historic resources. Bemiss later served on the Virginia Commission on Outdoor Recreation (charged with preserving as well as utilizing parks, historic landmarks and scenic rivers and roads). During his retirement, in 2008 Bemiss wrote the afterword to Conserving the Commonwealth with Margaret T. Peters.

In addition to supporting his Episcopal Church, Bemiss served as chairman of the boards of the Richmond Library, and of the Woodberry Forest School. He also served trustee and President of the Virginia Historical Society and of the Virginia Museum of Fine Arts, as well as treasurer of the Sheltering Arms hospital in Richmond, and as a director of the Children's Home Society. Bemiss also donated US$1 million to the medical school at Virginia Commonwealth University in Richmond.

== Death ==
Bemiss, who suffered from Parkinson's disease after his retirement, died on February 7, 2011, in Richmond. After services at St. James Episcopal Church, he was buried in at Hollywood Cemetery in Richmond. His papers are at the Virginia Historical Society. Former President George H. W. Bush attended the funeral and burial.
