= W. Griffith Purcell =

American attorney and politician

Member of the Virginia House of Delegates for Richmond
- In office January 11, 1950 – September 29, 1956 Serving with William H. Adams, Albert O. Boschen, G. Edmond Massie, Charles H. Phillips, Fred G. Pollard, J. Randolph Tucker, Jr., J. Moscoe Huntley, George E. Allen Jr., Edward E. Lane, Euguene B. Sydnor Jr., FitzGerald Bemiss, E. Tucker Carlton
- Preceded by: Walter L. Hopkins
- Succeeded by: Harold H. Dervishian

Personal details
- Born: July 14, 1912 Richmond, Virginia, U.S.
- Died: April 1, 1983 (aged 70) Richmond, Virginia, U.S.
- Party: Democratic
- Education: University of Richmond
- Profession: lawyer

Military service
- Branch/service: U.S. Army
- Years of service: 1943–1946
- Rank: Colonel
- Battles/wars: World War II

W. Griffith Purcell (July 14, 1912 – April 1, 1983) was a Virginia lawyer and politician, who represented his native Richmond from 1950 to 1956, before retiring to concentrate on his general practice.

== Early and family life ==
Purcell was born to in Richmond, Virginia, to the former Alice Griffith and her husband John Michael Purcell. His family lived in Clay ward, and by 1930 included a maiden aunt, and an elder brother (John Jr.) as well as younger brothers James and Edward. His father had died by 1940. By that time, Griffith had graduated from Benedictine High School, then the University of Richmond and had become a lawyer. A lifelong Catholic, he never married, but in 1940 was supporting his mother, aunt and a brother, and in 1950 was living with his 70-year-old aunt.

== Career ==
Upon being admitted to the Virginia bar, Purcell had a solo practice, but was active in the Virginia Bar Association, as well as his Catholic Church, Elks, American Legion and Veterans of Foreign Wars.

On January 4, 1943, Purcell enlisted as a private in the U.S. Army during World War II, rising to the rank of colonel. He (or another man of the same name) served in the infantry and was wounded. He was enlisted as an officer on January 18, 1945, and discharged on April 22, 1946.

In 1949 Purcell ran for and won election as one of seven delegates representing Richmond in the Virginia House of Delegates, and won re-election twice (serving 1950 to 1956), as the tumultuous Massive Resistance period began. He replaced either Walter I. Hopkins or Walter H.C. Murray, among the top finishers for the session which began in January 1950. In 1952, only one member of Richmond's delegation changed, with W. Moscoe Huntley replacing G. Edmond Massie. In 1954, George E. Allen Jr., Edward E. Lane and Euguene B. Sydnor Jr. joined the delegation (but Sydnor resigned after the 1954 session and was replaced by FitzGerald Bemiss). In 1956, following both U.S. Supreme Court decisions in Brown v. Board of Education (1954 and 1955), E. Tucker Carlton joined the Richmond delegation. Only three men represented Richmond in the 1956 convention concerning Massive Resistance, which included his former colleague G. Edmund Massie. In the 1958 election, Purcell was replaced either by Harold H. Dervishian or Thomas N. Parker Jr.

== Death and legacy ==
Purcell died at St. Mary's Hospital in Richmond following a heart attack. He was interred at Mount Cavalry cemetery in Richmond.
