= Edward E. Willey Bridge =

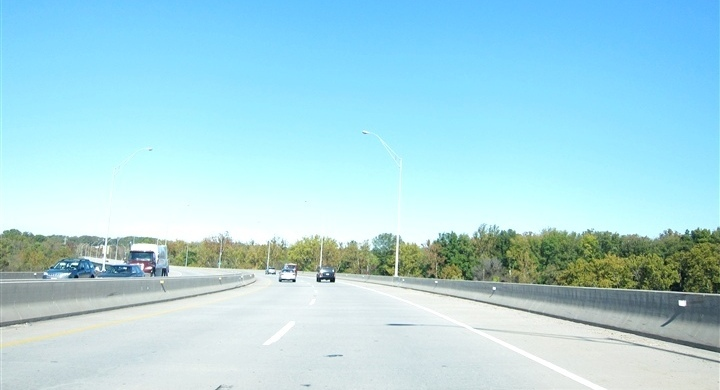
- Coordinates: 37°33′34″N 77°34′17″W
- Carries: Chippenham Parkway
- Crosses: James River
- Locale: Henrico County, Virginia
- Named for: Edward E. Willey

History
- Construction end: December 1989

Statistics
- Toll: No

Location
- Interactive map of Edward E. Willey Bridge

Edward E. Willey Bridge is a highway bridge which crosses the upper James River (above the fall line at Richmond) in the western portion of Henrico County, Virginia. It carries Chippenham Parkway (State Route 150) between Parham Road in Henrico and the southwestern portion of the independent city of Richmond. It was named in honor of Edward E. Willey who was a pharmacist and state senator in the Virginia General Assembly from 1952 until his death in 1986.

Since the 18th century, bridges (and earlier ferry service) across the James River have been a major issue for residents of the City of Richmond, the former City of Manchester (merged into Richmond in 1910), and the counties of Henrico and Chesterfield on the north and south sides respectively.

The Willey Bridge and an adjacent portion of Chippenham Parkway were constructed with funds generated by a special continuation of tolls granted by the U.S. Congress for a period of time on a portion of the former Richmond-Petersburg Turnpike (I-95) in the 1980s. This funding enabled the Willey Bridge (as it is known locally) to be opened as a toll free facility. The bridge began construction before 1988 and was complete in December 1989 along with the extension connecting it to the Chippenham Parkway.

The James River is relatively shallow where the Willey Bridge crosses well above the falls of the river at Richmond. In contrast, at the south end of the Chippenham Parkway, a very costly high-level bridge was required on the Pocahontas Parkway to cross over the navigable tidal portion of the same river downstream of the deepwater Port of Richmond.

The bridge is a peculiar design, as it makes somewhat of an "S" shape. As you travel north on the bridge, it takes a left hand turn on the south end, remains straight over the river and turns right on the north end.
