= T. Coleman Andrews =

American civil servant

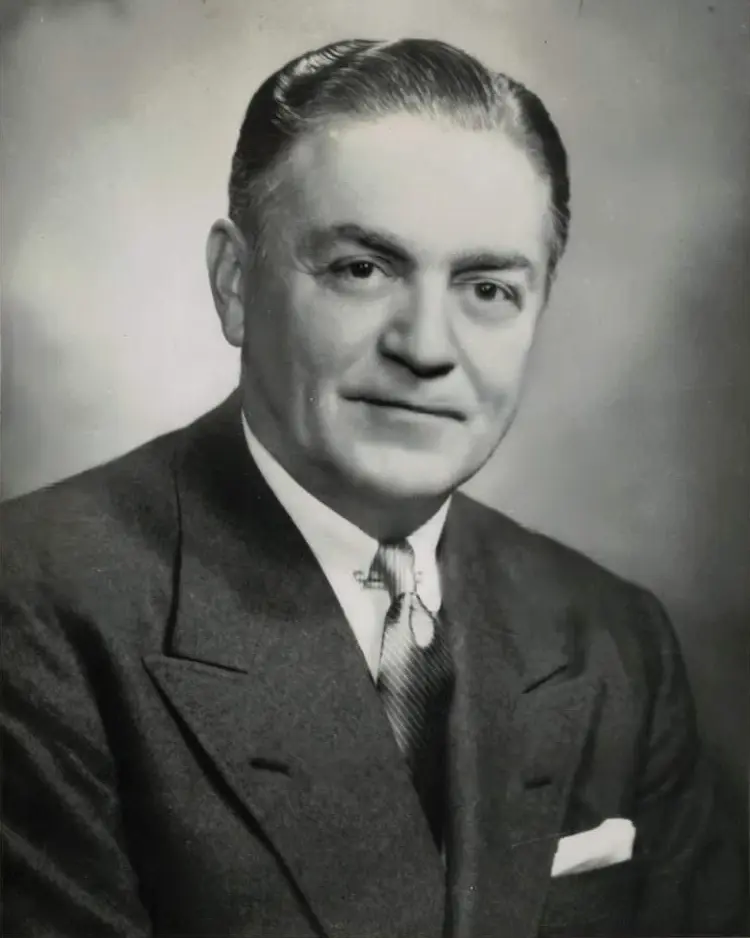

Commissioner of Internal Revenue
- In office February 4, 1953 – October 31, 1955
- President: Dwight D. Eisenhower
- Preceded by: Justin F. Winkle (acting)
- Succeeded by: O. Gordon Delk (acting)

Personal details
- Born: Thomas Coleman Andrews; February 19, 1899 Richmond, Virginia, US
- Died: October 15, 1983 (aged 84) Richmond, Virginia, US
- Party: Republican
- Other political affiliations: States' Rights Party (1956)
- Spouse: Rae Wilson Reams
- Children: 2, including T. Coleman Jr.

Thomas Coleman Andrews (February 19, 1899 – October 15, 1983) was an American accountant, state and federal government official, and the States' Rights Party candidate for President of the United States in 1956.

== Early and family life ==
Andrews was born in Richmond, Virginia, to Cheatham William Andrews (a driver who rose to overseer of a livery stable) and his wife (Dora Lee Pittman); the family traced its descent from Elizabethan cleric Lancelot Andrewes. He had an older brother, Edgar L. Andrews (1897-1950), and a younger brother, Ramon Washington Andrews (1903–1974). Thomas Coleman Andrews married Rae Wilson Reams (1900–1989), and they had two sons: Thomas Coleman Andrews Jr. and Wilson Pittman Andrews (1929–2012; he would become a U.S. Coast Guard officer and entrepreneur).

== Career ==
After graduating from John Marshall High School in Richmond in 1916, Andrews worked as an office boy at Armour meat packing company in Richmond. He then studied accounting privately, worked with a public accounting firm, F.W. Lafrentz & Company, and was certified as a CPA in 1921. Andrews formed his own public accounting firm in 1922. He went on leave from his firm in 1931 to become the auditor of public accounts for the Commonwealth of Virginia, a position he held until 1933. He then became the accounting member of the Public Utilities Rate Study Commission of Virginia. He also took leave in 1938 to serve as controller and director of finance for his home city, Richmond.

During World War II, as his sons enlisted in the Air Corps and Coast Guard, Andrews served in the office of the Under-Secretary of War as a fiscal director, and in 1942 was assigned to the staff of the Contract Renegotiation Division in the Office of the Undersecretary of the Navy. He joined the United States Marine Corps in 1943, which lent him to the State Department, and so he worked as an accountant in North Africa and then was a staff officer in the Fourth Marine Aircraft Wing, achieving the rank of major before his retirement.

Andrews then joined the U.S. General Accounting Office and became the first director of its Corporation Audits Division, then returned to private practice in Richmond in 1947. In addition to continuing to work with T. Coleman Andrews & Company (founded in 1922), he founded Bowles, Andrews & Towne (actuaries and pension fund consultants) in 1948) and Andrews and Howell (management engineering consultants) in 1952. He was active in the AICPA, serving as its treasurer (1926–1927), vice president (1948–49), and president (1950–51), and was also a member of its council and executive committees, including the GABF, and received its gold medal award in 1947. He was AICPA's representative to the Second International Congress of Accountants in 1926 and chairman of the Accounting and Auditing Study Group of the Hoover Commission in 1948 and then was chairman of the Virginia Citizens Committee for the Hoover Report.

He accepted an appointment as Commissioner of Internal Revenue in 1953, becoming the first CPA to hold that office. He left the position in 1955, stating his opposition to the income tax. Andrews ran for president as the States' Rights Party candidate in the election of 1956; his running mate was former Congressman Thomas H. Werdel. Andrews won 107,929 votes (0.17% of the vote), running strongest in the state of Virginia (6.16% of the vote), winning Fayette County, Tennessee and Prince Edward County, Virginia.

While running for office, Andrews was a trustee and visiting lecturer of the University of Virginia's Graduate School of Business Administration (1955–56). In 1965, Andrews retired from his accounting businesses and worked with his sons in organizing a variety of service enterprise firms. He was a founding member of the John Birch Society and served on its national council.

His son Thomas Coleman Andrews Jr. would become a prominent political organizer and segregationist who thrice won election to the Virginia House of Delegates in the 1960s and supported Alabama Governor George C. Wallace for president in 1968.

== Death, honors and legacy ==
Andrews survived his wife by more than a decade before he died in Richmond. During his lifetime, Andrews received honorary legal degrees from the University of Michigan in 1955 and from Grove City College in 1963. He also received an honorary Doctor of Commercial Science from Pace College in 1954 and an honorary Doctor of Science degree from the University of Richmond, as well as the Department of the Treasury's Alexander Hamilton Award (1955).

Government offices
Preceded by Justin F. Winkle; Acting	Commissioner of Internal Revenue; February 4, 1953 – October 31, 1955	Succeeded by O. Gordon Delk; Acting
