= Lewis F. Powell Jr. =

US Supreme Court justice from 1972 to 1987

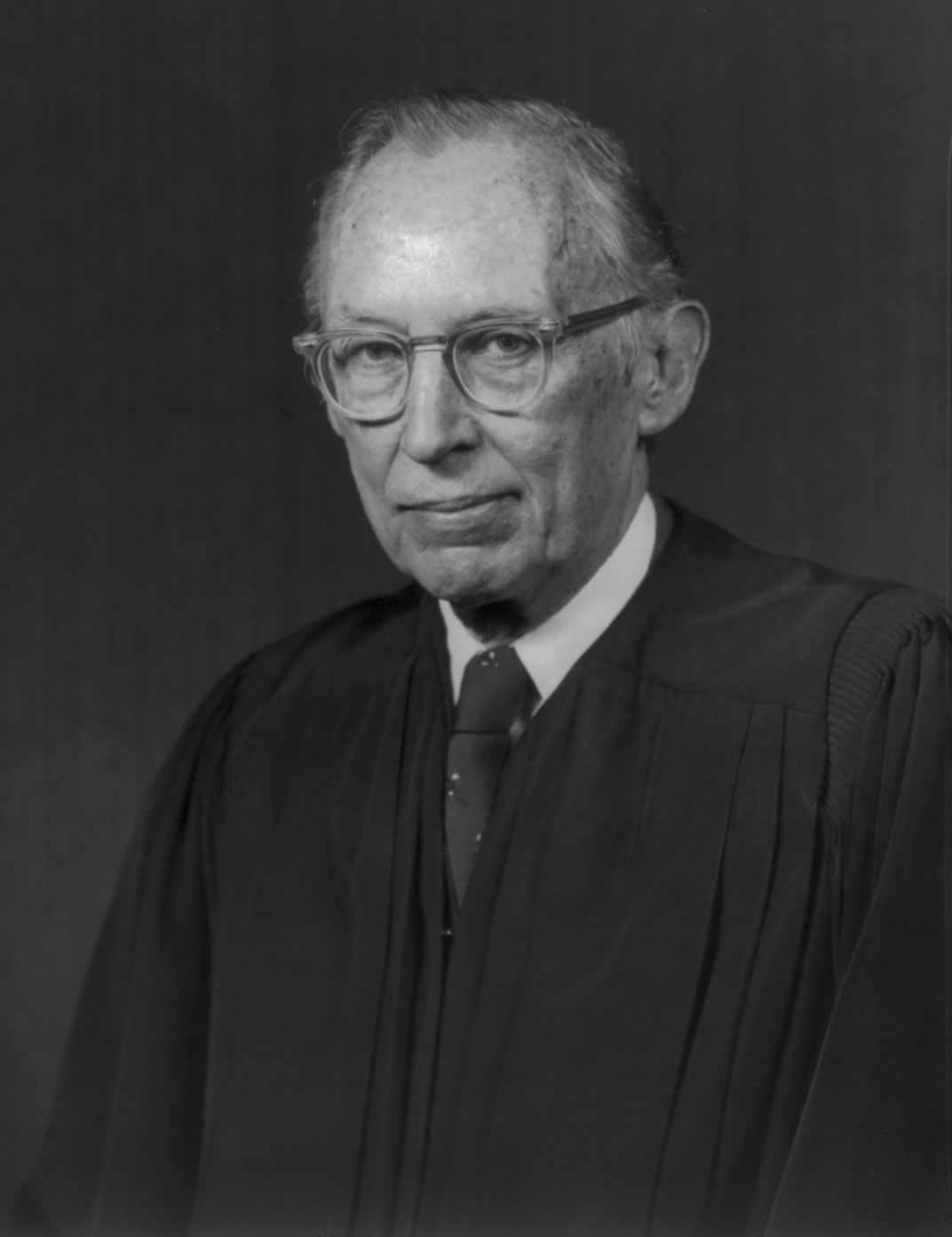
- Official portrait, 1976

Associate Justice of the Supreme Court of the United States
- In office January 7, 1972 – June 26, 1987
- Nominated by: Richard Nixon
- Preceded by: Hugo Black
- Succeeded by: Anthony Kennedy

President of the Virginia State Board of Education
- In office February 23, 1968 – January 29, 1969
- Governor: Mills Godwin
- Preceded by: Mosby Perrow Jr.
- Succeeded by: Anne Dobie Peebles

88th President of American Bar Association
- In office 1964–1965
- Preceded by: Walter Early Craig
- Succeeded by: Edward W. Kuhn

Chair of the Richmond School Board
- In office 1952–1961
- Preceded by: Randolph W. Church
- Succeeded by: Alice H. Lee

Personal details
- Born: Lewis Franklin Powell Jr. September 19, 1907 Suffolk, Virginia, U.S.
- Died: August 25, 1998 (aged 90) Richmond, Virginia, U.S.
- Resting place: Hollywood Cemetery; 37°32′17.4″N 77°27′22.6″W
- Party: Democratic
- Spouse: Josephine Pierce Rucker (m. 1936; died 1996)
- Children: 4
- Education: Washington and Lee University (BA, LLB); Harvard University (LLM)

Military service
- Allegiance: United States
- Branch/service: United States Army; Army Air Forces
- Years of service: 1942–1945
- Rank: Colonel
- Unit: 319th Bombardment Group; United States Department of War; United States Strategic Air Forces in Europe
- Battles/wars: World War II; Operation Torch; Allied invasion of Sicily; Mediterranean Theater
- Awards: Legion of Merit; Bronze Star; Croix de Guerre
- Lewis F. Powell Jr.'s voice Lewis F. Powell Jr. delivers the opinion of the Court in Chiarella v. United States. Recorded March 18, 1980

Lewis Franklin Powell Jr. (September 19, 1907 – August 25, 1998) was an American lawyer and jurist who served as an associate justice of the Supreme Court of the United States from 1972 to 1987.

Born in Suffolk, Virginia, he graduated from Washington and Lee University School of Law and Harvard Law School and served in the United States Army Air Forces during World War II. He worked for Hunton & Williams, a large law firm in Richmond, Virginia, focusing on corporate law and representing clients such as the Tobacco Institute. His 1971 Powell Memorandum became the blueprint for the rise of the American conservative movement and the formation of a network of influential right-wing think tanks and lobbying organizations, such as The Heritage Foundation and the American Legislative Exchange Council. In 1971, President Richard Nixon appointed Powell to succeed the late Associate Justice Hugo Black. He retired from the court during the administration of President Ronald Reagan, and was eventually succeeded by Anthony Kennedy.

His tenure largely overlapped with that of Chief Justice Warren Burger, and Powell was often a key swing vote on the Burger Court. His majority opinions include United States v. Brignoni-Ponce (1975), Gregg v. Georgia (1976), First National Bank of Boston v. Bellotti (1978), Solem v. Helm (1983), and McCleskey v. Kemp (1987), and he wrote an influential opinion in Regents of the University of California v. Bakke (1978). He notably joined the majority in controversial cases such as United States v. United States District Court (1972), Roe v. Wade (1973), Milliken v. Bradley (1974), Harris v. McRae (1980), Plyler v. Doe (1982), and Bowers v. Hardwick (1986).

== Early life and education ==
Powell was born in Suffolk, Virginia in 1907, the son of Mary Lewis (Gwathmey) and Louis Franklin Powell. Powell attended Washington and Lee University, where he became president of his fraternity, managing editor of the student newspaper, and a member of the yearbook staff. His major was commerce, but he also studied law. Powell had always planned on becoming a lawyer because he viewed their roles as shaping history. He graduated in 1929 with a B.A. magna cum laude and Phi Beta Kappa. He also was named recipient of the Algernon Sydney Sullivan Award for "generous service to others".

Powell then attended Washington and Lee University School of Law and in 1931 graduated as valedictorian of his class. He received his LL.M. from Harvard Law School in 1932, writing his thesis on relations between the Virginia Court of Appeals and the State Corporation Commission. He is one of two U.S. Supreme Court justices to have earned an LL.M.

He was elected president of the student body as an undergraduate with the help of Mosby Perrow Jr., and the two served together on the Virginia State Board of Education in the 1960s. Powell was a member of Phi Kappa Sigma fraternity and the Sigma Society. At a leadership conference, he met Edward R. Murrow, and they became close friends.

In 1936, he married Josephine Pierce Rucker with whom he had three daughters and one son. She died in 1996.

== Career ==
=== Military service (1939–1945) ===
During World War II, he first tried to join the United States Navy but was rejected because of poor eyesight, so he joined the US Army Air Forces as an Intelligence officer. After receiving his commission as a first lieutenant in 1942, he completed training at bases near Miami, Florida and Harrisburg, Pennsylvania. He was assigned to the 319th Bombardment Group, which moved to England later that year. He served in North Africa during Operation Torch and was later assigned to the Headquarters of the Northwest African Air Forces. There, Powell served in Sicily during the Allied invasion of Sicily.

In August 1943, he was assigned to the intelligence staff of the Army Air Forces in Washington, D.C. Slated for assignment as an instructor at the facility near Harrisburg, he worked instead on several special projects for the AAF headquarters until February 1944. He was then assigned to the intelligence staff of the Department of War and then the intelligence staff of the United States Strategic Air Forces in Europe. While there, Colonel Powell wrote in the aftermath of the February 1945 bombing of Dresden that "personally, I consider this very fortunate indeed as the German people are being taught for the first time in modern history what it means to have war on their own soil."

Powell was assigned to the Ultra project, as one of the officers designated to monitor the use of intercepted Axis communications. He worked in England and in the Mediterranean Theater and ensured that the use of Ultra information was in compliance with the laws of war, and that the use of such information did not reveal the source, which would have alerted that the code had been broken.

Powell advanced through the ranks to colonel, and received the Legion of Merit, Bronze Star Medal, and French Croix de Guerre with bronze palm. He was discharged in October 1945.

=== Legal career ===
In 1941, Powell served as chairman of the American Bar Association's Young Lawyers Division.

Powell was a partner for more than a quarter of a century at Hunton, Williams, Gay, Powell and Gibson, a large white shoe Virginia law firm, with its primary office in Richmond, now known as Hunton Andrews Kurth. Powell practiced primarily in the areas of corporate law, especially in the fields of business acquisitions, securities regulation, bankruptcy, real estate and railroad litigation.

From 1961 to 1962 Powell served as chair of the American Bar Association's Standing Committee on the Economics of Law Practice, which later evolved into the ABA Law Practice Division. During his tenure as chair of the committee, The Lawyers Handbook was first published and distributed to all attorneys who joined the ABA that year. In its preface, Powell wrote, "The basic concept of freedom under law, which underlies our entire structure of government, can only be sustained by a strong and independent bar. It is plainly in the public interest that the economic health of the legal profession be safeguarded. One of the means toward this end is to improve the efficiency and productivity of lawyers."

In 1964, he was elected president of the ABA. Powell led the way in attempting to provide legal services to the poor, and he made a key decision to cooperate with the federal government's Legal Services Corporation. Powell was also involved in the development of Colonial Williamsburg, where he was both a trustee and general counsel. From 1964 until his court appointment in 1971, he was a board member of Philip Morris and acted as a contact point for the tobacco industry with Virginia Commonwealth University. Through his law firm, Powell represented the Tobacco Institute and various tobacco companies in numerous cases.

=== Virginia government (1951–1970) ===
Powell played an active role in local community affairs. From 1951 to 1961, he served on the Richmond School Board and was its chairman from 1952 to 1961. Powell presided over the school board at a time when the Commonwealth of Virginia was locked in a campaign of defiance against the Supreme Court's decision in Brown v. Board of Education (1954), which desegregated public schools. Powell's law firm, although not Powell himself, represented one of the defendant school districts in Davis v. County School Board of Prince Edward County, which was consolidated later into Brown.

The Richmond School Board had no authority at the time to force integration, however, as control over attendance policies had been transferred to the state government. Powell, like most white Southern leaders of his day, did not speak out against the state's defiance, but he fostered close working relationships with many black leaders, such as civil rights lawyer Oliver Hill, some of whom offered key support for Powell's Supreme Court nomination. In 1990, Powell swore in Virginia's first black governor, Douglas Wilder.

From 1961 to 1969, Powell sat on the Virginia Board of Education, serving as its president from 1968 to 1969.

=== Powell Memorandum (1971) ===
On August 23, 1971, prior to accepting Nixon's nomination to the Supreme Court, Powell was commissioned by his neighbor Eugene B. Sydnor Jr., a close friend and education director of the U.S. Chamber of Commerce, to write a confidential memorandum for the chamber entitled "Attack on American Free Enterprise System," an anti-Communist and anti-New Deal blueprint for conservative business interests to retake America. It was based in part on Powell's reaction to the work of activist Ralph Nader, whose 1965 exposé on General Motors, Unsafe at Any Speed, put a focus on the auto industry putting profit ahead of safety, which triggered the American consumer movement. Powell saw it as an undermining of the power of private business and a step toward socialism. His experiences as a corporate lawyer and a director on the board of Phillip Morris from 1964 until his appointment to the Supreme Court made him a champion of the tobacco industry who railed against the growing scientific evidence linking smoking to cancer deaths. He argued, unsuccessfully, that tobacco companies' First Amendment rights were being infringed when news organizations were not giving credence to the cancer denials of the industry.

The memo called for corporate America to become more aggressive in molding society's thinking about business, government, politics and law in the U.S. It inspired wealthy heirs of earlier American industrialists, the Earhart Foundation (whose money came from an oil fortune), and the Smith Richardson Foundation (from the cough medicine dynasty) to use their private charitable foundations, which did not have to report their political activities, to join the Carthage Foundation, founded by Richard Mellon Scaife in 1964. The Carthage Foundation pursued Powell's vision of a pro-business, anti-socialist, minimally government-regulated America based on what he thought America had been in the heyday of early American industrialism, before the Great Depression and the rise of Franklin D. Roosevelt's New Deal.

The Powell Memorandum ultimately came to be a blueprint for the rise of the American conservative movement and the formation of a network of influential right-wing think tanks and lobbying organizations, such as the Business Roundtable, the Heritage Foundation, the Cato Institute, Manhattan Institute for Policy Research and the American Legislative Exchange Council (ALEC), and inspired the U.S. Chamber of Commerce to become far more politically active. CUNY professor David Harvey and sociologist Thomas Volscho trace the rise of neoliberalism in the United States to this memo. Historian Gary Gerstle refers to the memo as "a neoliberal call to arms." Political scientist Aaron Good describes it as an "inverted totalitarian manifesto" designed to identify threats to the established economic order following the democratic upsurge of the 1960s.

Powell argued, "The most disquieting voices joining the chorus of criticism came from perfectly respectable elements of society: from the college campus, the pulpit, the media, the intellectual and literary journals, the arts and sciences, and from politicians." In the memorandum, Powell advocated "constant surveillance" of textbook and television content, as well as a purge of left-wing elements. He named consumer advocate Nader as the chief antagonist of American business. Powell urged conservatives to undertake a sustained media-outreach program, including funding neoliberal scholars, publishing books, papers, popular magazines, and scholarly journals, and influencing public opinion.

This memo foreshadowed a number of Powell's court opinions, especially First National Bank of Boston v. Bellotti, which shifted the direction of First Amendment law by declaring that corporate financial influence of elections by independent expenditures should be protected with the same vigor as individual political speech. Much of the future court opinion in Citizens United v. Federal Election Commission relied on the same arguments raised in Bellotti.

Although written confidentially for Sydnor at the Chamber of Commerce, it was discovered by Jack Anderson, a columnist for The Washington Post, who reported on its content a year later, after Powell had joined the Supreme Court. Anderson alleged that Powell was trying to undermine the democratic system; however, in terms of business's view of itself in relation to government and public interest groups, the memo could also be viewed as simply the conventional wisdom of the business community at the time.

While the explicit goal of the memo was not to destroy democracy, its emphasis on political institution-building as a concentration of big business power—particularly updating the chamber's efforts to influence federal policy—has reportedly had anti-democratic effects. It was a major force in motivating the chamber and other groups to modernize their efforts to lobby the federal government. Following the memo's directives, the number of conservative foundations greatly increased, pouring money into think-tanks. This rise of conservative lobbying led to the conservative intellectual movement and its increasing influence over mainstream political discourse, starting in the 1970s and 1980s, and due chiefly to the works of the American Enterprise Institute and the Heritage Foundation.

During the 2024 presidential election season, the Powell memo was called out as the basis for the Heritage Foundation's audacious and wide-reaching Project 2025 agenda for their hoped-for next Republican administration.

=== Supreme Court tenure (1972–1987) ===
When Abe Fortas resigned in 1969, Nixon asked Powell to join the Supreme Court, but Powell turned him down, and Judge Harry Blackmun of the Eighth Circuit Court of Appeals was appointed instead (after the Senate rejected Judges Clement F. Haynsworth and G. Harrold Carswell). In 1971, Nixon asked him again. Powell was unsure, but Nixon and his attorney general, John N. Mitchell, persuaded him that joining the court was his duty to the nation. One of Powell's primary concerns was the effect leaving his law firm and joining the high court would have on his personal finances, as he had a very lucrative private practice. Another was that, as a corporate attorney, he would be unfamiliar with many of the issues that would come before the Supreme Court, which then heard very few corporate law cases. Powell feared that that would put him at a disadvantage and make it unlikely that he could influence his colleagues.

Nixon nominated Powell and William Rehnquist to the court on the same day, October 21, 1971. Powell's nomination generated no controversy and he took over the seat of Hugo Black after being confirmed by the Senate 89–1 on December 6, 1971 (Oklahoma Democrat Fred R. Harris cast the only vote against confirmation). On the day of Powell's swearing-in, Rehnquist's wife, Nan, asked Powell's wife, Josephine, whether this was the most exciting day of her life. Josephine said: "No, it is the worst day of my life. I am about to cry."

Powell served from January 7, 1972, until his retirement on June 26, 1987.

Powell voted with the 7–2 majority in Roe v. Wade (1973), which struck down state laws banning abortion. His pro-choice stance stemmed from an incident during his tenure at his Richmond law firm in which the girlfriend of one of Powell's office staff had bled to death after an illegal self-induced abortion.

Powell dissented in the 1972 case Furman v. Georgia, striking down capital punishment statutes, and was a key mover behind the court's compromise opinion in Gregg v. Georgia (1976), which permitted capital punishment but only with strengthened procedural safeguards. In Coker v. Georgia (1977), the court considered the State of Georgia's death sentence for a convicted murderer who escaped from prison and, in the course of committing an armed robbery and other offenses, raped a woman. It held that the death penalty was unconstitutionally disproportionate punishment for the rape. Powell wrote that the rape victim did not "sustain serious or lasting injury" and voted to overturn the death sentence, though he rebuked the plurality's statement that "for the rape victim, life may not be nearly so happy as it was, but it is not over and normally is not beyond repair", writing, "some victims are so grievously injured physically or psychologically that life is beyond repair".

Powell joined the majority opinion in a number of controversial cases related to race and racial integration. He was in the majority in Milliken v. Bradley (1974), which struck down a school busing plan designed to racially integrate Detroit-area public school districts across district lines, and wrote the majority opinions in both San Antonio Independent School District v. Rodriguez (1973) and Village of Arlington Heights v. Metropolitan Housing Development Corp. (1977), which diverged from the precedent established by Brown v. Board of Education.

Powell dissented in Bates v. State Bar of Arizona (1977), which held that advertising by lawyers was protected free speech under the First Amendment. He wrote that because lawyers offer professional services rather than standardized products, lawyer advertising was inherently misleading and could deceive the public.

Powell's plurality opinion in Regents of the University of California v. Bakke (1978), not joined in full by any other justice, represented a compromise between the opinion of Justice William J. Brennan, who, joined by three other justices, would have upheld affirmative action programs under a lenient judicial test, and that of John Paul Stevens, joined by three other justices, who would have struck down the university's use of racial quotas at issue in the case under the Civil Rights Act of 1964. Powell's opinion striking down the law urged that strict scrutiny be applied to affirmative action programs but suggested that some might pass Constitutional muster.

Powell wrote the majority opinion in First National Bank of Boston v. Bellotti (1978), which overturned a Massachusetts law restricting corporate contributions to referendum campaigns not directly related to their business.

Despite opposing abortion bans, Powell joined the majority in Harris v. McRae (1980), which held that states participating in Medicaid are not required to fund medically necessary abortions for which federal reimbursement was not available after the Hyde Amendment restricted the use of federal funds for abortion. The court also held that the Hyde Amendment did not violate the Fifth Amendment or the Establishment Clause of the First Amendment.

In the controversial 1980 case Snepp v. U.S., the court issued a per curiam opinion upholding a lower court's imposition of a constructive trust upon former CIA agent Frank Snepp and its requirement for preclearance of all his published writings with the CIA for the rest of his life. In 1997, Snepp gained access to the files of Justices Thurgood Marshall (who had already died) and William Brennan (who granted Snepp access) and confirmed his suspicion that Powell had written the opinion. Snepp later pointed out that Powell had misstated the factual record and not reviewed the actual case file (Powell habitually wrote opinions based on briefs alone), and that the only justice who had looked at the case file was John Paul Stevens, who relied upon it in his dissent. From his days in counterintelligence during World War II, Powell believed in the need for government secrecy and urged the same position on his colleagues during the court's consideration of 1974's United States v. Nixon.

Powell joined the 5–4 majority opinion in the 1982 case Plyler v. Doe holding that a Texas law forbidding illegal immigrant children from public education was unconstitutional.

Powell was the deciding vote in the 1986 case Bowers v. Hardwick, in which the court upheld Georgia's sodomy laws. He was reportedly conflicted over his vote. Conservative clerk Michael W. Mosman advised him to vote to uphold the ban, and Powell, who believed he had never met a gay person (not knowing that one of his clerks was a closeted gay man), did so. But in his concurring opinion, he criticized the prison terms the law prescribed as excessive. The court overruled Bowers in the 2003 case Lawrence v. Texas. In 1990, after his retirement from the court, Powell said, "I think I made a mistake in the Hardwick case"—one of the few times a justice has expressed regret for a vote. Scholars later found that Powell unknowingly hired more gay clerks than any other justice. Paul M. Smith, the gay attorney who successfully argued in favor of overturning Bowers in Lawrence, had clerked for Powell in 1980–81.

Powell also expressed regret for his vote to uphold the death penalty in McCleskey v. Kemp (1987), citing a study that found that, except as punishment for the most violent crimes, people sentenced for murdering white victims were up to 40 times more likely to receive the death penalty than people who killed black victims. In an interview with his biographer John Calvin Jeffries, he said he no longer supported the death penalty.

== Retirement and death ==
Powell was nearly 80 years old when he retired from his position as Supreme Court justice in June 1987. His career on the bench was described by Gerald Gunther, a professor of constitutional law at Stanford Law School, as "truly distinguished" because of his "qualities of temperament and character," which "made it possible for him, more than any contemporary, to perform his tasks in accordance with the modest, restrained, yet creative model of judging."

Powell was succeeded by Anthony Kennedy. Kennedy was the third nominee for the position. The first, Robert Bork, was rejected by the United States Senate after a bitter confirmation fight. The second, Douglas H. Ginsburg, withdrew his name from consideration after admitting to having smoked marijuana both as a college undergraduate and with his students while a law professor.

After retiring from the Supreme Court, Powell regularly sat on various United States Courts of Appeals around the country.

In 1990, Douglas Wilder asked Powell to swear him in as governor of Virginia. Wilder was the first elected African American governor in the United States.

On August 25, 1998, Powell died of pneumonia at his home in the Windsor Farms area of Richmond, Virginia, at the age of 90. He is buried in Richmond's Hollywood Cemetery.

== Legacy ==
In her 2002 book The Majesty of the Law, Justice Sandra Day O'Connor wrote of Powell, "for those who seek a model of human kindness, decency, exemplary behavior, and integrity, there will never be a better man."

Powell's personal and official papers were donated to his alma mater, Washington and Lee University School of Law, where they are open for research, subject to certain restrictions. A wing at Sydney Lewis Hall, home of W&L Law, which houses his papers, is named for him.

J. Harvie Wilkinson, a judge on the Fourth Circuit and former law clerk for Powell, wrote a book titled Serving Justice: A Supreme Court Clerk's View describing the experience.

In 1993, President Bill Clinton signed into law an act of Congress renaming the federal courthouse in Richmond, Virginia the Lewis F. Powell Jr. United States Courthouse in Powell's honor.

== See also ==
- List of justices of the Supreme Court of the United States
- List of law clerks for the first seat of the Supreme Court of the United States
- List of United States Supreme Court justices by time in office
- United States Supreme Court cases during the Burger Court
- United States Supreme Court cases during the Rehnquist Court

Legal offices
Preceded by Hugo Black	Associate Justice of the Supreme Court of the United States; 1972–1987	Succeeded by Anthony Kennedy
