= T. Nelson Parker =

American politician (1898–1973)

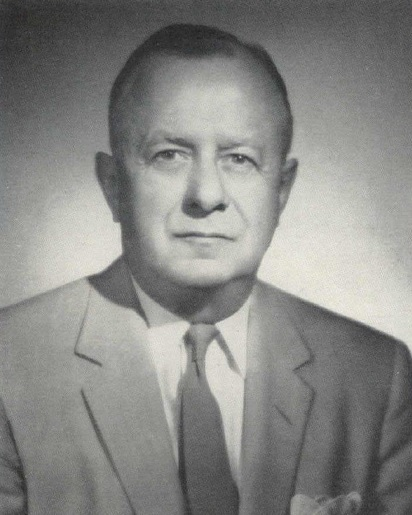

5th Virginia Commissioner of Insurance
- In office July 1, 1956 – July 1, 1969
- Preceded by: George A. Bowles
- Succeeded by: Everette S. Francis

Chair of the Democratic Party of Virginia
- In office August 28, 1952 – December 1, 1952
- Preceded by: William M. Tuck
- Succeeded by: Thomas H. Blanton

60th Mayor of Richmond, Virginia
- In office July 1, 1950 – July 1, 1952
- Preceded by: W. Stirling King
- Succeeded by: Edward E. Haddock

Personal details
- Born: Thomas Nelson Parker; September 28, 1898 Richmond, Virginia, U.S.
- Died: May 12, 1973 (aged 74) Richmond, Virginia, U.S.
- Resting place: Hollywood Cemetery
- Party: Democratic
- Spouse(s): Elise Flannagan (died 1960) Helen Reid (m. 1962)
- Children: 3, including Thomas Jr.
- Education: University of Virginia; University of Virginia School of Law (LLB)

Thomas Nelson Parker (September 28, 1898 – May 12, 1973) was an American politician from Virginia. He served as mayor of Richmond from 1950 to 1952, chaired the Democratic Party of Virginia during the 1952 United States presidential election, and was Virginia Commissioner of Insurance from 1956 to 1969.

== Early life ==
Thomas Nelson Page was born in Richmond, Virginia. He graduated from John Marshall High School. He graduated with a bachelor's degree from the University of Virginia and a law degree from the University of Virginia School of Law. He was admitted to the bar in 1923.

== Career ==
After graduating, Parker practiced law privately until 1943. He then became the chief attorney for the Office of Price Administration in Richmond, where he later headed the office's legal department across eight Southern states. Governor Colgate W. Darden appointed him as special attorney to investigate the illegal slot machine business in Virginia. Parker was mayor of Richmond from 1950 to 1952. He was the state chair of Adlai Stevenson II's 1952 presidential campaign. He was Virginia's Commissioner of Insurance from 1956 to his retirement in 1971.

Parker was president of the Christian Children's Fund in Richmond during the early 1940s. He also served as president of the National Association of Insurance Commissioners.

== Personal life ==
Parker married Helen Reid. They had two sons and a daughter, Thomas Nelson Jr., Edward R. and Mrs. James Paul. He lived on Canterbury Road in Richmond.

Parker died on May 12, 1973, at a hospital in Richmond. He was buried in Hollywood Cemetery.
