= Thomas P. Bryan =

American politician

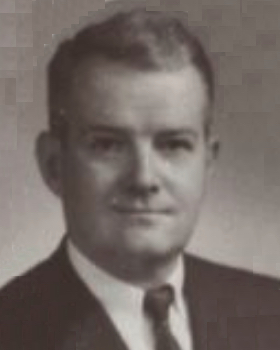
- Official portrait, 1968

Member of the Virginia House of Delegates from Richmond City
- In office January 10, 1968 – January 14, 1970
- Preceded by: J. Sargeant Reynolds
- Succeeded by: Carl E. Bain

62nd Mayor of Richmond, Virginia
- In office July 1, 1954 – July 2, 1956
- Preceded by: Edward E. Haddock
- Succeeded by: F. Henry Garber

Personal details
- Born: Thomas Pinckney Bryan Jr. October 10, 1918 Richmond, Virginia, U.S.
- Died: March 28, 1983 (aged 64) Richmond, Virginia, U.S.
- Party: Democratic
- Spouse: Alice Wellford (m. 1944)
- Education: University of Virginia (BA); University of Richmond (LLB)

Military service
- Branch/service: United States Navy; Naval Reserve
- Rank: Lieutenant commander
- Battles/wars: World War II

Thomas Pinckney Bryan Jr. (October 10, 1918 – March 28, 1983) was an American lawyer and politician who served in the Virginia House of Delegates. Elected in 1967 to represent Richmond in the House, he was defeated in 1969 by pharmacist Carl E. Bain. He served on the Richmond City Council from 1952 to 1958, including 2 years as the city's mayor.
