= Medical Society of Virginia =

Professional association for physicians

- Formation: 1820
- Type: Professional association
- Headquarters: Richmond, Virginia
- Location: United States
- Official language: English
- President: Clifford L. Deal III, MD, FACS

The Medical Society of Virginia (MSV), is a professional association of more than 11,000 Virginia physicians, medical students, residents, physician assistants and physician assistant students. It was founded in December 1820, and incorporated in 1824. It has been responsible for the creation of the State Board of Health, the State Board of Medical Examiners, the Board of Medicine and the MSV Review Organization (which has evolved into the Virginia Health Quality Center). Each of these now independent entities had their beginnings within the Medical Society of Virginia. This organization is the only association representing all Doctor of Medicine (M.D.) and Doctors of Osteopathic Medicine (D.O.), regardless of specialty or type of practice setting in Virginia.

== MSV Entities ==
The MSV is made up of three entities; the nonprofit Foundation (MSVF), the Political Action Committee, the MSVPAC, and the for-profit Medical Society of Virginia Insurance Agency (MSVIA).
