= Carl E. Bain =

American politician (1927–1983)

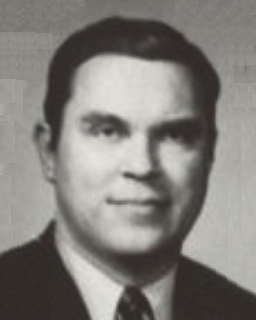

Member of the Virginia House of Delegates from the 33rd district
- In office January 14, 1970 – January 9, 1974
- Preceded by: Thomas P. Bryan
- Succeeded by: Walter H. Emroch

Personal details
- Born: Carl Edgar Bain; January 23, 1927 Roanoke, Virginia, United States
- Died: May 16, 1983 (aged 56) San Francisco, California, United States
- Party: Republican
- Spouse: Doris Lansing
- Education: Medical College of Virginia (BS)
- Occupation: Pharmacist; politician

Military service
- Branch/service: United States Navy; Naval Reserve
- Battles/wars: World War II

Carl Edgar Bain (January 23, 1927 – May 16, 1983) was an American pharmacist and politician who served in the Virginia House of Delegates. The only Republican elected to represent Richmond in the House in 1969 and 1971, he was defeated in 1973 by attorney Walter H. Emroch.
