= Second Presbyterian Church (Richmond, Virginia) =

Historic church in Virginia, United States

- U.S. National Register of Historic Places
- Virginia Landmarks Register
- Richmond City Historic District
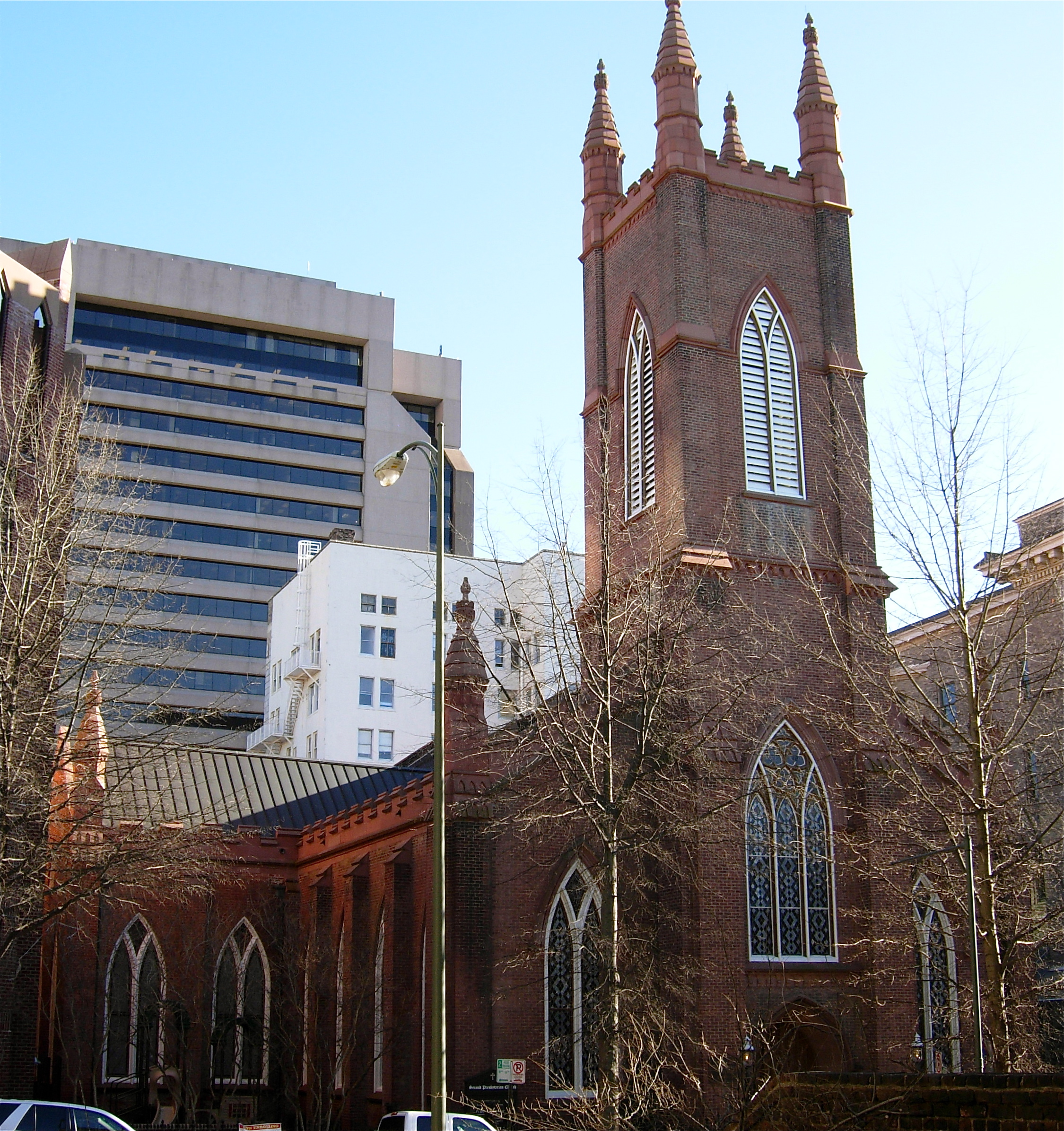

- Location within Virginia Location within the United States
- Location: 5 N. 5th St., Richmond, Virginia
- Coordinates: 37°32′25″N 77°26′23″W
- Area: 9.9 acres (4.0 ha)
- Built: 1848
- Architect: Minard Lafever
- Architectural style: Gothic Revival
- NRHP reference No.: 72001525
- VLR No.: 127-0016

Significant dates
- Added to NRHP: March 29, 1972
- Designated VLR: November 16, 1971

Second Presbyterian Church is a historic Presbyterian church located at 5 N. 5th Street in Richmond, Virginia. It was designed by architect Minard Lafever and was built in 1848. It is a brick veneer Gothic Revival style church with lancet windows and a square pinnacled tower with an arched entrance at the front of the church.

It was listed on the National Register of Historic Places in 1972.
