= Howard Carwile =

American lawyer and politician

Howard Hearnes Carwile

Member of the Virginia House of Delegates from the 35th district
- In office January 9, 1974 – January 14, 1976
- Preceded by: William Ferguson Reid
- Succeeded by: Gerald Baliles

Personal details
- Born: November 14, 1911 Charlotte County, Virginia, U.S.
- Died: June 6, 1987 (aged 75) Richmond, Virginia, U.S.
- Party: Independent
- Spouse: Violet Talley
- Education: Alma White College; Southeastern University

Howard Hearnes Carwile (November 14, 1911 – June 6, 1987) was an American lawyer and politician.

== Early and family life ==
Howard Carwile was born in Charlotte County, Virginia, to parents Willis Early Carwile (May 6, 1873 – May 10, 1950) and Allie Taylor (July 2, 1887 – November 23, 1968); they were tenant tobacco farmers. Howard was one of 13 children. His great-great-grandfather Jacob Carwile, served as a soldier in the American Revolutionary War.

In 1948, he married Violet Virginia Talley (January 28, 1918 – October 21, 1994), daughter of John C. Talley (May 8, 1882 – ?) and Virginia Magnetta Cullingsworth (March 27, 1895 – Feb. 1986), and a divorced beautician. Howard and Violet had one son, Howard H. Carwile, Jr., and one grandchild, Taylor Lane Carwile. Both Howard and Violet died in Richmond, Virginia.

== Education ==
- Graduate of Alma White College, Zarephath, New Jersey
- Graduate of Southeastern University Law School, Washington, D.C.

== Career ==
Howard Carwile was known as a fiery, passionate trial attorney in Richmond, Virginia. He opposed the Byrd Organization in his early years, a machine of Conservative Democrats led by Harry Flood Byrd which dominated Virginia's politics from the 1920s until the mid-1960s.

Carwile represented many black clients as a trial lawyer in the 1940s through 1960s in Richmond. He was an ever-vigilant watchdog over the Richmond Police Department and champion for reform of Virginia's prisons and a general political gadfly. He was known for his colorful rhetoric in public, such as calling a city-hall boondoggle he disliked a "horrendous heap of hokum" and his campaign style, including an automobile completely covered in Carwile bumper-stickers. Richmonders appreciated his verbal theatrics, and in the 1970s it was not uncommon to hear someone say he or she was "shocked and appalled", a frequent Carwile exclamation. His case against Richmond Newspapers concerning an editorial by the Richmond Times-Dispatch reached the Virginia Supreme Court in 1954 and was decided in his favor. A collection of his papers is housed in the Special Collections and Archives section of the library of Virginia Commonwealth University.

Richmond voters elected Carwile to the city council in 1966 and re-elected him several times. In 1973, voters in Richmond and Henrico County elected Carwile as their representative (part-time) in the Virginia House of Delegates, so he resigned his municipal position, but only served a single term. His successor, fellow Virginia lawyer Gerald L. Baliles, would later become Governor of Virginia, a post which decades earlier had eluded Carwile.

- Ran as Independent for Governor of Virginia in 1945 against Democrat William M. Tuck and Republican S. Lloyd Landreth.
- Ran as Independent for Virginia U.S. Senator in 1948 against Democrat Absalom Willis Robertson, Republican Robert H. Woods, Progressive Virginia Foster Durr and Socialist Clarke T. Robbe
- Ran as Independent for Governor of Virginia in 1953 against Democrat Thomas Bahnson Stanley and Republican Theodore Roosevelt Dalton
- Ran as Democrat for Governor of Virginia in 1957 primary against J. Lindsay Almond labeling himself a "Jacksonian Democrat". He campaigned for "peaceful compliance with the Supreme Court decision on integration", "preservation of Virginia's free public school system" and poll tax removal.
- Ran unsuccessfully as Independent for Virginia's 3rd congressional district of U.S. House in 1980 against Republican Thomas J. Bliley, Jr., Democrat John Aydelotte Mapp (April 20, 1913 – August 17, 2002) and Independent James B. Turney

== Government offices held ==
- Richmond City Councilman – 1966 – resigned 1973
- Virginia House of Delegates – 35th District, Henrico County, Virginia, 1974-5, defeated for re-election by Gerald L. Baliles 1975

Served on Virginia House committees:

- Health, Welfare & Institutions
- Militia and Police

== Memberships ==
- Association of Trial Lawyers of America
- Richmond Trial Lawyers Association
- Virginia Trial Lawyers Association
- American Bar Association
- Richmond Criminal Bar

== Published and broadcast works ==
- Weekly columnist for the Richmond Afro-American newspaper
- Published Speaking from Byrdland, a compilation of his weekly radio programs decrying racial segregation
- Autobiography Carwile, His Life and Times, published June 1988 ISBN 1-55618-043-8

Clean up City Hall – every crevice and crack;
Purge the parasite and liquidate the quack.
Carwile in Council will be something new;
He will represent all but the privileged few.
"The Taxpayers Candidate"

— Howard Carwile, From his handbill as an unsuccessful candidate for Richmond City Council in 1962
