= William Ferguson Reid =

American politician (born 1925)

Member of the Virginia House of Delegates from the Henrico County district
- In office January 10, 1968 – January 8, 1975
- Preceded by: T. Coleman Andrews Jr.
- Succeeded by: Howard Carwile

Personal details
- Born: March 18, 1925 (age 101) Richmond, Virginia, U.S.
- Party: Democratic
- Education: Virginia Union University; Howard University (M.D.)

William Ferguson "Fergie" Reid (born March 18, 1925) is a Virginia physician, politician and civil rights activist. In 1968, Reid became the first African-American elected to the Virginia Assembly since the days of Reconstruction. He won re-election twice to the Virginia House of Delegates, representing Richmond and part of surrounding Henrico County.

The 90 for 90 campaign, organized by Chesterfield County, Virginia Democrats in 2015 to encourage broader voter participation especially in gerrymandered precincts, was organized in honor of Reid's 90th birthday.

== Early and family life ==
Fergie Reid was born in Richmond on March 18, 1925, the son of dentist Leon Reid and his wife. He grew up in a house next to that of prominent banker and activist Maggie L. Walker at 110 Leigh Street in Richmond's Jackson Ward. Both houses shared the same street number, and one day "a courtly man with a Van Dyke beard" appeared at the Reid family's door, mistaking it for the Walker residence. The stranger proved to be scholar and civil rights activist W. E. B. Du Bois. Reid was 9 years old when Maggie L. Walker died in 1934, but long remembered her vividly, "She was widowed and living with her children and grandchildren . . . . Naturally we were together every day in our house or their house; so we were very close." He could name Walker's grandchildren-- "Maggie, Laura, Armistead, Mamie Evelyn and Elizabeth"—and that Elizabeth was his age.

In 1941 Reid graduated from Armstrong High School, and in 1946 he received his bachelor's degree from Virginia Union University. He earned his medical degree from Howard University, and served his internship and residency as a surgeon in St. Louis, Missouri.

After the civil rights events described below, Reid and his wife eventually moved to Chevy Chase, Maryland. Both their daughters and son (William Ferguson Reid Jr.) became physicians, with the daughters practicing in Maryland and New Jersey and their son in Hollywood, California. Reid was active in his Episcopal Church and the Salvation Army, as well as with Omega Psi Phi and became a 32nd degree Mason.

== Career ==
Reid served as a lieutenant in the United States Navy during the Korean War, with the 1st Marine Division, and later at the Bethesda Naval Hospital in Maryland. Returning to Richmond, he became active in civic and professional affairs. He served on the staff of Richmond Memorial Hospital, Richmond Community Hospital, Retreat for the Sick, Medical College of Virginia and St. Mary's Hospital. His professional associations included the American College of Surgeons, Richmond Academy of Medicine, Richmond Medical Society, Medical Society of Virginia, Old Dominion Medical Society, American Medical Association and the National Medical Association. He became a diplomate of the American Board of Surgery in 1955.

== Civil rights activism ==
Reid co-founded the Richmond Crusade for Voters in 1956. He hoped to register and mobilize black voters during Massive Resistance. He was a de facto member of the Civil Rights Movement. Senator Harry F. Byrd Sr. and his Democratic political machine in Virginia largely controlled statewide politics. According to Michael Paul Williams of the Richmond Times-Dispatch: "This was an era of poll taxes, literacy tests and other mechanisms to weaken black political clout. The entrenched Byrd political machine stood in defiance of change."

Reid, John Mitchell Brooks and Dr. William S. Thornton began meeting daily at the old Slaughter's Hotel, a popular segregation-era gathering place for black Richmonders in Jackson Ward. The outgrowth of these strategy sessions was the Crusade.

African Americans gained national support with the Civil Rights Movement through the passage of the Civil Rights Act of 1964 and the Voting Rights Act of 1965. An important outcome was Federal oversight and enforcement of voting rights. Under Section 5 of the Voting Rights Act, decisions affecting elections became subject to clearance by the U.S. Department of Justice.

== Political career ==
The Crusade had been formed in 1955 to register more voters to combat the racist politics driven by the era of "massive resistance," part of a Southern strategy to thwart the U.S. Supreme Court's rulings that public schools be desegregated. "No civic organization did more to democratize local politics in 20th-century Richmond than the Crusade," opined University of Richmond history professor Dr. Julian Maxwell Hayter in his book, "The Dream Is Lost: Voting Rights and the Politics of Race in Richmond, Virginia." Reid co-founded the Richmond Crusade for Voters with Dr. William Thornton, John M. Brooks, Ethel T. Overby and Lola Hamilton.

Despite the Crusade for Voters' continuing growth in influence, Reid's first candidacy for public office failed. In 1965, he was seventh among the eight candidates seeking the five seats in the Virginia House of Delegates representing Richmond. However, the Byrd Organization was crumbling. In early 1966, Virginia's U.S. Senator Harry F. Byrd died of a brain tumor, and two of his prominent lieutenants, conservative Democrats Rep. Howard W. Smith of the 8th congressional district and U.S. Senator A. Willis Robertson, lost in the Democratic primary. In the summer of 1969, the Democratic Party engaged in a bitterly fought gubernatorial primary and "an exhausting run-off election which left the old organization fragmented and set the stage for "the election of Linwood Holton", a Republican who had lost his first gubernatorial run in 1965.

But Reid won election to the House of Delegates in 1967, unseating prominent segregationist T. Coleman Andrews Jr., who would co-found the American Independent Party to support the 1968 presidential candidacy of George C. Wallace of Alabama. The first African American elected to the Virginia General Assembly since 1891, Reid took his seat in the lower chamber in January 1968, alongside Eleanor P. Sheppard, who had opposed school closings and became Richmond's first female mayor. Reid would serve three terms in the Virginia General Assembly, winning re-election in 1969 and 1971. Although Reid was the only African American in the General Assembly when he took office in 1968, by 2000 there were fifteen.

In 1973, Reid was defeated by colorful Richmond city councilman Howard Carwile, who vowed to "raise hell", but was defeated for re-election in 1975 by prominent lawyer Gerald L. Baliles, who eventually became governor of Virginia.

After his final term as delegate ended, Reid accepted a position as regional medical officer with the U.S. State Department, which caused him to maintain a home in Washington, D.C.'s Maryland suburbs, as well as travel abroad. His activism then continued from a distance, as the Crusade for Voters helped win an African American majority on Richmond's City Council and elected Henry L. Marsh the city's first African American mayor in 1977. Reid also recorded an oral history for Virginia Commonwealth University, available online.

The Henrico County School Board in 2012 named a school in honor of Dr. William Ferguson Reid.

== 90 for 90 campaign ==
In honor of Reid's 90th birthday, in 2015 in Chesterfield County, Virginia, the 90 for 90 voter registration goal based on door-to-door volunteer canvassing began. The 90 for 90 voter outreach program spread throughout the Commonwealth of Virginia and beyond.

In 2015, Denise Oliver-Vélez wrote for Daily Kos that "While much of the media is focusing on presidential hopefuls for 2016, the state of Virginia has key elections coming up this year—elections for the Virginia House of Delegates.... A unique effort is underway in Virginia to get voters registered and out to vote, not just this year, but in the election years to come. The impetus and inspiration behind this drive is a civil rights icon in Virginia, Dr. William Ferguson Reid, known to many as 'Fergie,' who was the first black man to win a seat in the Virginia General Assembly since Reconstruction."
