= Walter H. Emroch =

American politician

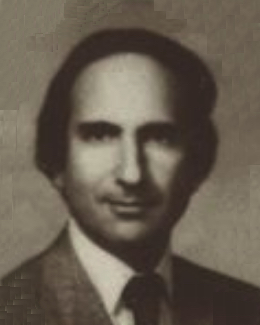
- Portrait of Emroch, c. 1982

Member of the Virginia House of Delegates from the 33rd district
- In office January 11, 1978 – January 12, 1983
- Preceded by: Eleanor P. Sheppard
- Succeeded by: Joseph B. Benedetti
- In office January 9, 1974 – January 14, 1976
- Preceded by: Carl E. Bain
- Succeeded by: Franklin P. Hall

Personal details
- Born: Walter Herman Emroch; November 3, 1938 (age 87) Richmond, Virginia, U.S.
- Party: Democratic
- Spouse: Karen Sproles
- Education: University of Virginia (BA, LLB)

Military service
- Branch/service: United States Army
- Rank: Captain

Walter Herman Emroch (born November 3, 1938) is an American attorney and politician who served in the Virginia House of Delegates. A Richmond native, he is a partner at that city's personal injury law firm Emroch & Kilduff, which he founded in 1970.

A Democrat politically, he was first elected to the House in 1973 in Richmond's multi-member 33rd district. He served one term before being defeated in the 1975 primary election but ran again successfully in 1977. He remained in office until 1982, when he was defeated by Republican Joseph B. Benedetti in the newly-drawn 68th district.

== Early life and education ==
Emroch was born to a Jewish family in Richmond, Virginia on November 3, 1938. His father, Emanuel Emroch (1908–1991), was an attorney, and his mother, the former Bertha Vitsky (1908–2000), was a housewife. He attended Thomas Jefferson High School, followed by the University of Virginia and its law school, earning a B.A. and LL.B. in 1961 and 1964, respectively.

== Career ==
=== Law ===
Emroch founded the personal injury law firm Walter H. Emroch & Associates (now Emroch & Kilduff) in 1970.

=== Politics ===
Emroch was first elected to the Virginia House of Delegates in 1973 as one of four members from Virginia's 33rd House of Delegates district. In June 1975, he was defeated in the Democratic primary election. He ran again successfully in 1977.

In 1981, the General Assembly redrew the state's legislative districts. In the case Cosner v. Dalton, filed in the United States District Court for the Eastern District of Virginia, the created House map was declared unconstitutional. The Court allowed the 1981 elections to proceed but for a one-year term only. A new general election would thus be held in November 1982, under a new map. Emroch was drawn into the new 68th district After a competitive race, he lost to Republican Joseph B. Benedetti, garnering 8,952 votes to Benedetti's 9,565.
