= Morrill Martin Crowe =

American politician

Mayor of Richmond, Virginia
- In office 1964–1968

Personal details
- Education: Washington University in St. Louis

Morrill Martin "Doc" Crowe (17 August 1901 – 10 June 1994) served as mayor of Richmond, Virginia, from 1964 through 1968 and was on the Richmond city council from 1964 through 1970.

Crowe was born in St. Louis, Missouri. After graduating from Washington University in 1923, he became a registered pharmacist. In 1939 Crowe moved to Richmond, Virginia, to become promotional director for a pharmaceutical manufacturer. Because of his work, he was usually called "Doc" Crowe.

As mayor, Crowe opposed the governor's proposed sales tax in 1966. He supported private negotiations with Chesterfield County that led to the controversial annexation in 1970 of twenty-three square miles of that county by Richmond.

In 1969 L. Douglas Wilder (later governor of Virginia) defeated Crowe for election to the Senate of Virginia. Crowe then announced that he would not seek another term on the city council.
