= Thomas N. Parker Jr. =

American politician

Member of the Virginia House of Delegates from Richmond City
- In office January 8, 1958 – January 13, 1960
- Preceded by: J. Randolph Tucker Jr.
- Succeeded by: T. Coleman Andrews Jr.

Personal details
- Born: Thomas Nelson Parker Jr. March 15, 1927 Richmond, Virginia, U.S.
- Died: April 26, 2011 (aged 84) Warm Springs, Virginia, U.S.
- Party: Democratic
- Spouse: Elizabeth Jackson Ragland (m. 1951, divorced)
- Children: 3
- Parent: T. Nelson Parker (father)
- Education: University of Virginia (BA, LLB)

Military service
- Branch/service: United States Navy
- Battles/wars: World War II

Thomas Nelson Parker Jr. (March 15, 1927 – April 26, 2011) was an American politician who served in the Virginia House of Delegates. He was the son of T. Nelson Parker.
