= Virginia Health Quality Center =

- Industry: Health care
- Founded: 1984; 42 years ago
- Number of employees: 60
- Website: vhqc.org

Virginia Health Quality Center (VHQC) was an independent, not-for-profit corporation that primarily focused on health care quality assessment services. Their role was to assess the needs, implement improvements, and evaluate results as it related to how medical care is delivered by health care providers within a targeted geographic area. The VHQC's clients included federal and state agencies, health care providers, managed care organizations, and commercial health insurers in Virginia and throughout the United States.

As the Medicare-contracted Quality Improvement Organization for Virginia, they worked under the guidance of the Centers for Medicare and Medicaid Services (CMS), an agency of the United States Department of Health and Human Services.

== Description ==
Established in 1984, VHQC is a 501(c)(3) not-for-profit corporation with clients in both the public and private sectors. The VHQC has more than 60 employees, including physicians, nurses, biostatisticians, health educators and public relations professionals. It was the recipient of the 2002 United States Senate Productivity and Quality Award Plaque for Progress in Performance Excellence, the highest level award bestowed on an organization in Virginia during 2002.

The VHQC serves as the federally designated quality improvement organization for Virginia, and is one of the many Quality improvement organizations (QIOs) throughout the nation. The VHQC has held the CMS contract to provide quality improvement and Medicare beneficiary outreach services in Virginia since 1984. The VHQC partners with Virginia's health care community to improve patient care for Virginia's 913,886 Medicare beneficiaries in all health care settings, including hospitals, physician offices, nursing homes and home health agencies. The VHQC serves as an advocate for Virginia's Medicare beneficiaries, providing education and handling complaints.

The VHQC provides quality improvement assistance to Virginia's acute care hospitals and more than 700 physicians in a number of clinical topics such as heart failure, pneumonia, stroke, breast cancer and diabetes. In addition, the VHQC conducts many local and national projects that employ quality improvement techniques for at-risk populations.
