= Edward E. Haddock =

American physician and politician

Member of the Virginia Senate from the Richmond district
- In office January 1955 – January 1963

61st Mayor of Richmond, Virginia
- In office March __, 1952 – June 30, 1954
- Preceded by: T. Nelson Parker
- Succeeded by: Thomas P. Bryan

Personal details
- Born: July 12, 1911 Wilmington, North Carolina, U.S.
- Died: May 4, 1996 (aged 84) Richmond, Virginia, U.S.
- Party: Democratic
- Spouse(s): Kathleen Scott, Constance Haddock
- Education: University of Richmond; Medical College of Virginia
- Profession: physician

Military service
- Allegiance: United States
- Branch/service: U.S. Navy
- Years of service: 1942–1945
- Battles/wars: World War II

Edward Ellis Haddock (July 12, 1911 – May 4, 1996) was an American physician and politician. He served as mayor of Richmond, Virginia from 1952 to 1954, and in the Virginia State Senate for eight years (1955–1963) before retiring to concentrate on his general practice. He also served on the Richmond City Council for four years, and unsuccessfully ran for U.S. Congress from Virginia's 3rd congressional district in 1965.

== Early and family life ==
Haddock was born to in Wilmington, North Carolina to Richmond Streeter Haddock and his wife, the former Mary Jane Ellis. He graduated from the University of Richmond in 1934 and from the Medical College of Virginia in 1938. He had several brothers and sisters, including one brother who was a Methodist minister in Prince Edward County, Virginia. Haddock married twice, first in 1939 to Kathleen Scott, who produced son Edward Haddock Jr. and three daughters. His second marriage was to Constance (Connie) Haddock. He also had a stepson and stepdaughter.

== Career ==
Haddock was a general practitioner, starting his practice as an in-house physician for the DuPont corporation in 1940. Beginning in 1942, he served in the U.S. Navy as a medical officer during World War II, including aboard the USS Alaska.

Upon discharge, Haddock resumed his general practice. He was also active in his profession, helping to found the American Academy of Family Practice in 1946, as well as the Virginia Academy of Family Practitioners, and the Richmond Academy of Family Practitioners. Other professional memberships included the Richmond Academy of Medicine, the Virginia Medical Society, the Southern Medical Association and the American Medical Association.

Haddock was also active in his community, serving on the original board of directors of the Boys Club, as well as of the Richmond Symphony. He was also active in the Methodist Church, a Mason and Shriner. He served on the board of trustees of Virginia Wesleyan College, and lived next to the Richmond Country Club.

On November 8, 1986, a disgruntled former patient came to the general practitioner's office and began shooting, killing a nurse, a patient and himself, as well as wounding Dr. Haddock (then 75 years old) and his wife Connie. Haddock retired from his practice in 1988, but continued as an examining physician with the military processing station for Virginia recruits.

== Political career ==
Haddock was appointed to the Richmond City Council (Richmond, Virginia) in January 1952 to serve the remainder of the term of Edward E. Willey, who had resigned. The city council then elected Haddock mayor to succeed T. Nelson Parker. Haddock served from 1952 until 1954, when vice-mayor Thomas P. Bryan succeeded him. Haddock advocated improving the educational system, and also succeeded in improving Parker stadium, which helped bring Triple A baseball (International League) team to Richmond. However his suggested name, the "Richmond Confederates" proved controversial, so the new team was called the Richmond Virginians or "Vees" (under manager Luke Appling it began winning, but eventually developed a persistent losing record and was moved to Toledo, Ohio in 1964 and became the Toledo Mud Hens; after a year's delay the franchise became the Richmond Braves from 1966 until 2008, succeeded by the current Double A baseball Richmond Flying Squirrels).

Haddock then ran for and won election as one of three Senators representing Richmond in the Virginia State Senate, serving two terms (1955 to 1963), during the tumultuous Massive Resistance period. Haddock was one of the few moderate voices during the special legislative session that ultimately adopted the Stanley Plan opposing desegregation.

Haddock ran for the U.S. House of Representatives, Virginia's 3rd congressional district seat in 1964 as an independent, and won 30.8% of the vote in the three-man race won by Democrat David E. Satterfield III with 34.5% of the votes (Richard D. Obenshain was the Republican candidate who won 34% of the vote).

President Lyndon B. Johnson appointed Haddock to the federal Community Relations Service committee, and Dr. Haddock previously served on a similar committee in Richmond.

== Death and legacy ==
He was interred at Forest Lawn cemetery in Richmond.
