= Franklin P. Hall =

American politician (1938–2015)

Frank Hall
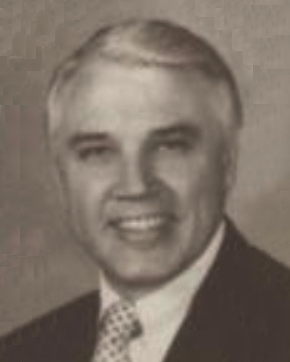

Member of the Virginia House of Delegates
- In office January 14, 1976 – April 14, 2009
- Preceded by: Walter H. Emroch
- Succeeded by: Betsy B. Carr
- Constituency: 33rd district (1976‍–‍1983); 69th district (1983‍–‍2009)

House Minority Leader
- In office January 9, 2002 – February 24, 2007
- Preceded by: Richard Cranwell
- Succeeded by: Ward Armstrong

Personal details
- Born: Franklin Perkins Hall; December 13, 1938 Amelia, Virginia, U.S.
- Died: May 26, 2015 (aged 76) Richmond, Virginia, U.S.
- Party: Democratic
- Spouse: Phoebe A. Poulterer
- Children: 2
- Education: Lynchburg College (BS); American University (MBA, JD)
- Occupation: Lawyer; politician

Franklin Perkins Hall (December 13, 1938 – May 26, 2015) was an American politician. A Democrat, he was a member of the Virginia House of Delegates 1976–2009, serving as minority leader 2002–07.

On March 28, 2009, Hall announced that he would retire from the House effective April 14. Governor Tim Kaine appointed him to the Virginia Alcoholic Beverage Control Board as of the same date. He died on May 26, 2015. His wife, Phoebe Poulterer Hall, Richmond's first female public defender, later one of its first female judges and for many years rector of the Board of Visitors of Virginia Commonwealth University died in January 2019. They are survived by a son, daughter and several grandchildren and buried in Amelia County, Virginia
