= J. Randolph Tucker Jr. =

American politician (1914–2015)

Member of the Virginia House of Delegates from Richmond City
- In office January 11, 1950 – January 8, 1958
- Preceded by: Edward T. Haynes
- Succeeded by: Thomas N. Parker Jr.

Personal details
- Born: John Randolph Tucker Jr. June 29, 1914 Richmond, Virginia, U.S.
- Died: November 27, 2015 (aged 101) Richmond, Virginia, U.S.
- Resting place: Hollywood Cemetery
- Party: Democratic
- Spouse: Helen McRae Wilkinson
- Children: 2
- Parent: J. Randolph Tucker (father)
- Education: Virginia Military Institute; Washington & Lee University
- Profession: Politician; lawyer; judge

Military service
- Allegiance: United States
- Branch/service: United States Army
- Years of service: 1940–1946
- Rank: Lieutenant colonel
- Battles/wars: World War II

John Randolph "Bunny" Tucker Jr. (June 29, 1914 – November 27, 2015) was an American attorney and politician who served as a member of the Virginia House of Delegates from 1950 to 1958, and later as a judge of the Circuit Court in Richmond.

== Early and family life ==
John Randolph Tucker Jr. was born in Richmond, Virginia, to the former Mary Byrd Harrison (1884–1959) and John Randolph Tucker Sr. (1879–1954). His paternal grandfather was Henry St. George Tucker III, and Bunny Tucker would be the sixth generation of lawyers and judges in the family. Bunny Tucker attended the Virginia Military Institute, graduating in 1937. He later graduated from Washington and Lee Law School in 1948.

== Career ==
Tucker enlisted in the U.S. Army in 1940 and served in Normandy, Northern France, the Rhineland, Ardennes and the Central European theaters during World War II. He led an Army tank crew which, among other European campaigns, liberated Mons, Belgium on September 2, 1944.

After graduating, Tucker joined the law firm Tucker, Mays, Moore and Reed in Richmond, where his father was a partner. The firm changed to Mays, Valentine, Davenport & Moore and Tucker became a partner. He practiced corporate law there until his retirement in 1980. He served in the Virginia House of Delegates from 1950 to 1958. He sponsored a bill that created the Richmond–Petersburg Turnpike Authority. The people called it "The Bunny Trail" after Tucker's nickname "Bunny". He was also a sponsor of legislation for mental health facility reform.

He was judge of a criminal case Richmond Hustings Court, which became Richmond Circuit Court during his tenure. He served in that court from 1968 to 1980.

== Personal life ==
Tucker married Helen Wilkinson. They had two sons, Carter Harrison and John Randoph III. His wife died in 1999.

Tucker died of pneumonia on November 27, 2015, aged 101, at a retirement community in Richmond. He was buried in Hollywood Cemetery.

Virginia House of Delegates
Preceded by Edward T. Haynes	Virginia Delegate for Richmond City; 1950–1958; Served alongside: Edward O. Boschen, William H. Adams, G. Edmund Massie, Charles H. Phillips, W. Griffith Purcell, Fred G. Pollard, W. Moscoe Huntley, Eugene B. Sydnor Jr., Edward E. Allen, George E. Allen Jr., FitzGerald Bemiss, E. Tucker Carlton	Succeeded by Thomas N. Parker Jr.
