= Fred G. Pollard =

American politician

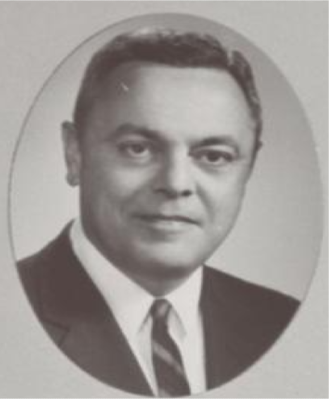
- Pollard in 1968

29th Lieutenant Governor of Virginia
- In office January 15, 1966 – January 17, 1970
- Preceded by: Mills Godwin
- Succeeded by: J. Sargeant Reynolds

Member of the Virginia House of Delegates for Richmond City and Henrico
- In office January 11, 1950 – January 12, 1966
- Preceded by: Walter L. Hopkins
- Succeeded by: J. Sargeant Reynolds

Personal details
- Born: Frederick Gresham Pollard; May 7, 1918 Lynchburg, Virginia, U.S.
- Died: July 7, 2003 (aged 85) Wythe County, Virginia, U.S.
- Party: Democratic
- Spouse: Pauline Hull Staley
- Children: 8
- Education: University of Virginia
- Profession: Attorney

Military service
- Allegiance: United States
- Branch/service: United States Navy
- Unit: Reserves
- Battles/wars: World War II

Frederick Gresham Pollard (May 7, 1918 – July 7, 2003) of Richmond, Virginia was an American lawyer and politician. He served in the Virginia House of Delegates and was the 29th Lieutenant Governor of the Commonwealth of Virginia.

== Early life and family ==
Fred G. Pollard was born to Robert Nelson Pollard and the former Mary Faulkner Butler. He attended Richmond Public Schools and the Episcopal High School before enrolling at the University of Virginia. He graduated with a BA in 1940 and an LLB in 1942. During World War II, Pollard served in the United States Naval Reserve. He subsequently entered the practice of law and later joined the firm of Williams Mullen, with whom he continued to work throughout his life.

Pollard had a brother, Robert Nelson Pollard, Jr. and a sister, Mary Butler Pollard Buford. Fred was married three times, with the marriages producing four children and four step-children.

He is buried in Hollywood Cemetery, Richmond, Virginia.

== Politics ==
Pollard represented parts of Henrico County and Richmond in the Virginia House of Delegates from 1950 to 1965, when he was elected lieutenant governor. Pollard ran for governor in 1969, but lost in the Democratic primary.

Political offices
Preceded by Mills E. Godwin	Lieutenant Governor of Virginia; 1966–1970	Succeeded by J. Sargeant Reynolds
