= T. Coleman Andrews Jr. =

American businessman and politician (1925–1989)

Member of the Virginia House of Delegates from Richmond City
- In office January 13, 1960 – January 9, 1968
- Preceded by: Thomas N. Parker Jr.
- Succeeded by: William F. Reid

Personal details
- Born: Thomas Coleman Andrews Jr. February 15, 1925 Richmond, Virginia, U.S.
- Died: April 16, 1989 (aged 64) Richmond, Virginia, U.S.
- Resting place: Hollywood Cemetery
- Party: Democratic
- Spouse: Barbara Ransome Andrews
- Children: 3
- Parent: T. Coleman Andrews (father)
- Education: Dartmouth College; Wharton School of Business

Thomas Coleman Andrews Jr. (February 15, 1925 – April 16, 1989) was an American businessman and politician who became known for his support of racial segregation.

== Early and family life ==
Andrews was born in Richmond, Virginia, to T. Coleman Andrews, an accountant and government official who became leading isolationist after World War II, and his wife, Ros Reams. He had a younger brother, Wilson Pittman Andrews, who would serve in the U.S. Coast Guard and become an entrepreneur in Richmond. His grandfather, Cheatham W. Andrews, also lived with the family by 1940, and had a job as a night watchman at a tobacco manufacturing plant. T. Coleman Andrews Jr. graduated from Thomas Jefferson High School in Richmond (where he played on the football team), then received a B.A. from Dartmouth College. He attended the Wharton School of Business of the University of Pennsylvania for two years.

When Andrews reached age 18 in 1943, during World War II, he enlisted in the Reserves of the Army Air Corps, and served as a combat navigator. He married Barbara Ransome Andrews (1928-1975) in 1950 and they had three sons and a daughter. After her death on December 18, 1977, he married Courtney Franklin Sargeant, daughter of James Franklin Sargeant Jr. of Charlottesville and his wife, at St. Paul's Episcopal Church in Ivy in Albemarle County, Virginia.

== Career ==
Upon returning from his wartime service, Andrews operated an insurance agency. His father received numerous honors and held various government positions during and after the war, then operated an accounting firm and related businesses and taught briefly at the University of Virginia's business school when he finished leading the Internal Revenue Service (1953-1955), and also ran for president (unsuccessfully). During the Korean War, the younger Andrews would serve as an auditor general. He was also active in the American Legion, Richmond Chamber of Commerce, Commonwealth Club and for a time was the secretary of the Richmond City Democratic Committee.

Richmond voters elected T. Coleman Andrews to the Virginia House of Delegates in 1959, during the massive resistance crisis following the U.S. Supreme Court decision in Brown v. Board of Education and related Virginia Supreme Court and federal court decisions; he was re-elected in 1961, 1963 and 1965. However, Andrews was defeated for re-election in 1967 by William Ferguson Reid, who became the first African-American member of the House of Delegates since 1891.

Andrews helped organize the American Independent Party and supported Alabama Governor George C. Wallace in the 1968 U.S. presidential election.

== Death and legacy ==
Andrews had three sons, T. Coleman III, A. Scott and Christopher R. He died on April 16, 1989, at a hospital in Richmond. He was buried in Hollywood Cemetery. His son Allen Scott Andrews and Marvin Pierce Bush (brother of President George W. Bush) founded Winston Capital Management of Washington, D.C.
