= 6th Massachusetts =

6th Massachusetts may refer to:

- 6th Massachusetts Regiment, a unit of infantry during the American Revolutionary War
- 6th Regiment Massachusetts Volunteer Militia, a 19th-century peacetime militia unit which saw active service during the American Civil War
- 6th Massachusetts Regiment (Spanish–American War), a unit of infantry during the Spanish–American War
