= Edmund Rice (Medal of Honor) =

United States Army Medal of Honor recipient

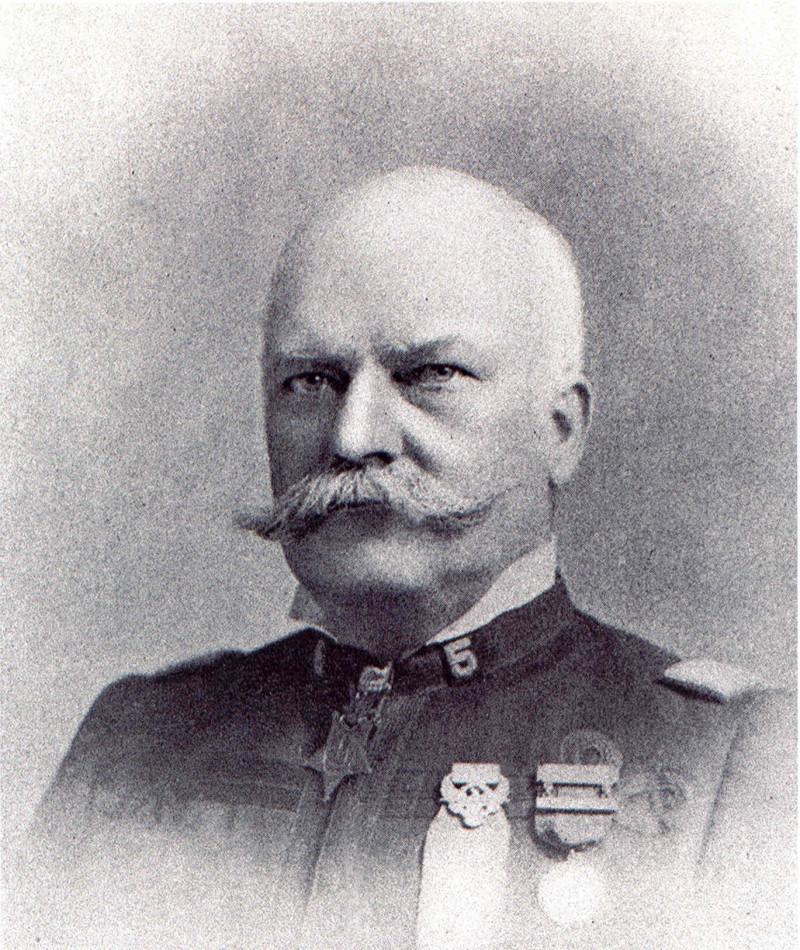
- Born: December 2, 1842; Brighton, Massachusetts, US
- Died: July 20, 1906 (aged 63); Wakefield, Massachusetts, US
- Burial place: Arlington National Cemetery
- Military career
- Allegiance: United States of America; Union
- Branch: United States Army; Union Army
- Service years: 1861–1903
- Rank: Brigadier General
- Unit: 19th Massachusetts Volunteer Infantry Regiment
- Conflicts: American Civil War, Indian Wars, Spanish–American War, Philippine–American War
- Awards: Medal of Honor

Edmund Rice (December 2, 1842 – July 20, 1906) was a soldier in the United States Army and a Medal of Honor recipient who achieved the rank of Brigadier General.

== Early life ==
Rice was born 2 December 1842 in Brighton, Massachusetts to Moses Maynard Rice and Eliza (Damon) Rice. In 1856 he entered Norwich University in Vermont and remained there until 1858; in 1874, he was awarded his Bachelor of Science degree as of 1860, and in 1898 he received the degree of Master of Arts. After three years he became an apprentice to Captain Lloyd on the clipper ship, Snow Squall, that left Long Wharf in Boston in September 1858 headed for Shanghai, China. After ten months at sea Edmund arrived back in New York City in June 1859. He then began working as a surveyor for his father's development interests.

== Civil War ==
On 22 Aug 1861, Rice joined the 14th Massachusetts Infantry and was commissioned a captain. He was soon transferred to the 19th Massachusetts Infantry Regiment to command Company F. With that unit he was engaged in the Civil War battles of: Ball's Bluff, Siege of Yorktown, Fair Oaks, Savage Station, Glendale, and Malvern Hill. He was promoted to the rank of major on 7 Sep 1862 and fought at Antietam later in September 1862, and the Battle of Fredericksburg December 11–13, 1862. For his actions at the Battle of Gettysburg in repelling Pickett's Charge, he was presented with the Medal of Honor in 1891. Made a lieutenant colonel 28 Feb 1864, he commanded his regiment in the Rapidan Campaign, the battles of Bristoe Station, Blackburn's Ford, Robinson's Cross Roads, and the Mine Run. He commanded the 19th in the Battle of the Wilderness on May 5–7, 1864 and at the battle of Laurel Hill on May 8, 1864. He was wounded and captured in the assault at the Battle of Spotsylvania Court House, May 12, 1864. While being transported as a prisoner on May 23, he escaped by cutting the door of a freight car and jumping from it while the train was moving at 15 mph. He reached Union lines, near the Ohio River, twenty-three days later. He was promoted to colonel on 28 July 1864.

He rejoined his unit in August 1864, and led the regiment in the Second battle of Deep Bottom, the Battle of Weldon Railroad, the Second battle of Ream's Station, and the Battle of Hatcher's Run; he was in command of Fort Stedman and batteries Eleven and Twelve in front of Petersburg, Virginia. He was present at the surrender of the Confederate States Army at Appomattox Court House, and returned to civilian life on June 30, 1865. Altogether, he was wounded three times. Just a year later, he entered the United States Army and was commissioned a first lieutenant in the 40th Infantry, July, 1866.

== Reconstruction ==
Rice married Annie Clark Dutch on August 30, 1866 in Charleston, South Carolina. He commanded the Post of Hilton Head, South Carolina and was also stationed in Raleigh, North Carolina, Jackson Barracks, Louisiana, Camp Distribution, Washington, D.C., and in Mississippi. After the Civil War, Rice invented several useful military implements, including the Rice Trowel Bayonet, the Rice Stacking Swivel, and a knife entrenching tool. In June 1868 Rice was assigned to the Springfield Armory to supervise the manufacture of the 'Rice Trowel Bayonet' for trial by the U.S. Army. While stationed there, his wife Annie died of tuberculosis at the age of twenty only 11 months after their daughter was born. Rice's daughter, Corrine, was raised by his mother and siblings.

== Indian wars ==
In 1874 Rice commanded an expedition against Ute tribe Indians near Spanish Peaks, Colorado, and volunteered for an 1876 campaign against Sioux Indians in Montana, in retaliation for the loss of the 7th Cavalry at Little Bighorn. Buffalo Bill Cody was employed as a scout to aid the company in its trip up the Yellowstone River in search of hostile Indians. In July 1879 Rice commanded a six-gun battery in Colonel Nelson Miles' expedition against the Sioux, north of the Missouri River near the Canada–US border. He took part in the engagement of July 17, where their Hotchkiss guns were used to disperse the Sioux.

Rice spent the remainder of the Indian Wars of the 1870s and 1880s mostly at Fort Keogh, Montana, Fort Totten, North Dakota, Fort Rice, North Dakota, and Fort Leavenworth, Kansas. In 1877 he was a military envoy to England and Russia. He was promoted to captain on 10 Mar 1883, and from 1888 through 1891 Edmund Rice was stationed in Texas at Fort McIntosh, Fort Bliss and finally in command of Fort Hancock. He was Commandant of the Columbian Guard at the 1893 World's Fair.

In 1881 he married his second wife, Elizabeth Huntington, in Cincinnati, Ohio. Corrine was then suddenly removed from her home in Massachusetts to live with her father and stepmother in the western frontier. The reunion was less than amicable and she returned to the east coast in 1888, settling in New Jersey with her husband Joseph H. Scharff, who was a grandnephew of secretary of State William H. Seward.

== Spanish–American War and Philippine–American War ==
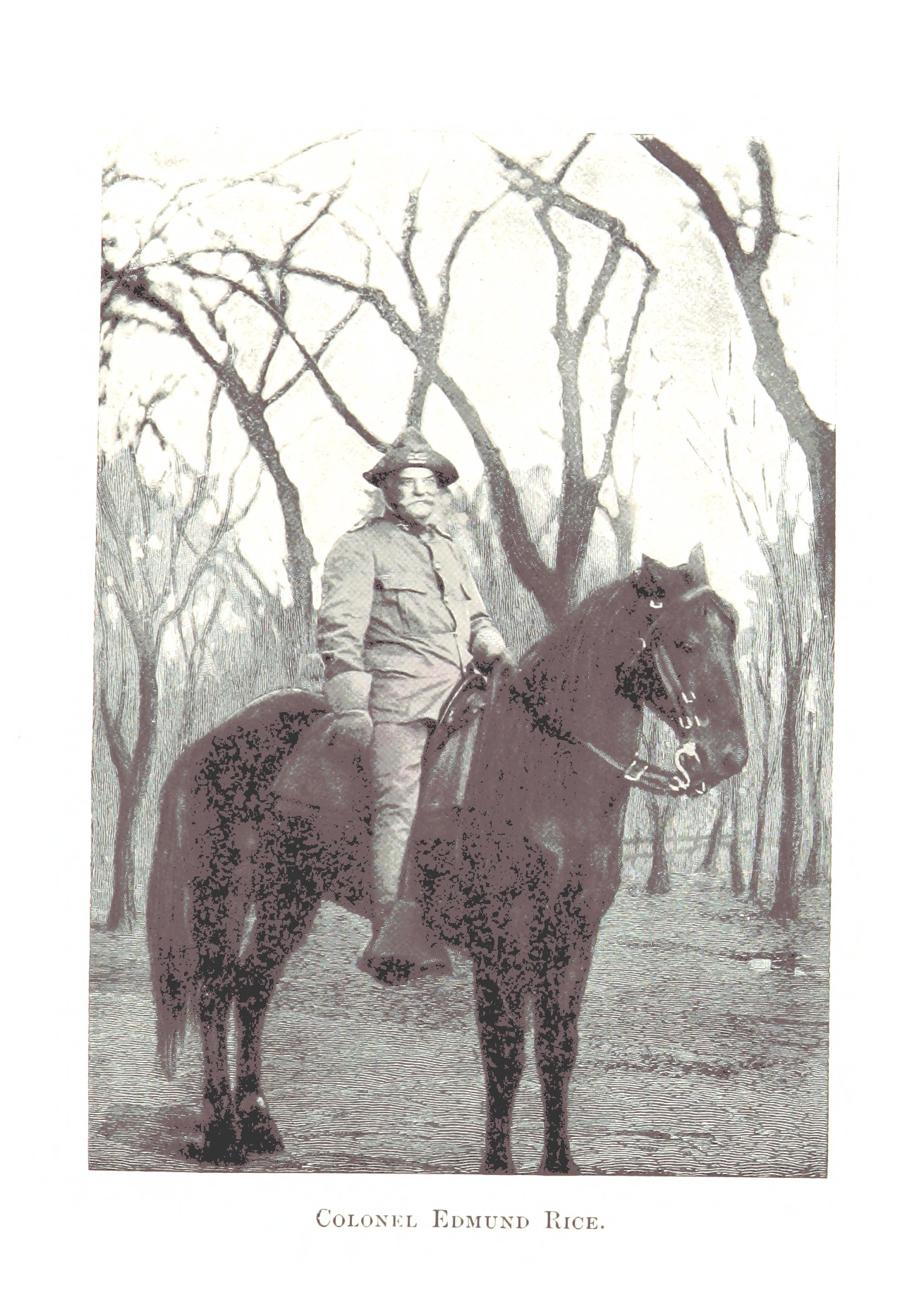
Colonel Edmund Rice on a horse, in "The '98 Campaign of the 6th Massachusetts, U.S.V." (book)

Edmund Rice served as U.S. military attaché at Tokyo, Japan from May 1897 through April 1898. At the outbreak of the Spanish–American War, he asked to be relieved from diplomatic duty and to be given active field command. In May, 1898 he was appointed inspector general with the rank of lieutenant colonel on the staff of General Nelson A. Miles. Later upon the recommendation of Miles, Rice was promoted to colonel and placed in command of the 6th Massachusetts Volunteer Regiment that saw active service in both Puerto Rico and Cuba.

In July 1898, Colonel Rice was appointed by President William McKinley to be the senior colonel of all U.S. Volunteers in the Philippines. He commanded the 26th Infantry Regiment, a New England regiment, that was involved in skirmishes against the insurgents and Moros. In 1899, he was appointed as Military Governor of the Island of Panay. In that capacity following recommendations of the First Philippine Commission, he established public schools, took the census, and administered the oath of allegiance to over 60,000 Filipinos. He served until Filipino General Martin Delgado was appointed first Civil Governor of Panay on April 11, 1901.

He returned to the United States in July 1901 after suffering from fever and heart disease brought on by the harsh tropical climate. The Philippine–American War was Rice's last war. He served until his retirement in command of the 19th U.S. Infantry at the Presidio of San Francisco.

== Military inventions ==
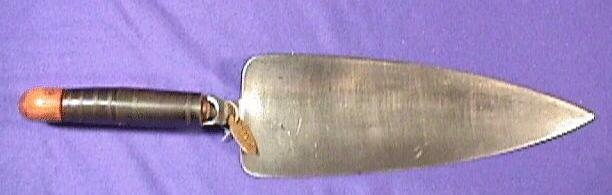
U.S. BAYONET MODEL 1873 TROWEL

Rice was an inventor of military equipment that were in use by military organizations around the world for decades. Some of his inventions include:

- (U.S. patent 91,564) Improved Trowel Bayonet, 22 June 1869
- (U.S. patent 127,104) Improved Bayonet Scabbard, 21 May 1872
- (U.S. patent 194,051) Improved Bayonet, 26 March 1875
- (U.S. patent 573,918) Individual Shelter Tent, 29 December 1896

== Retirement ==
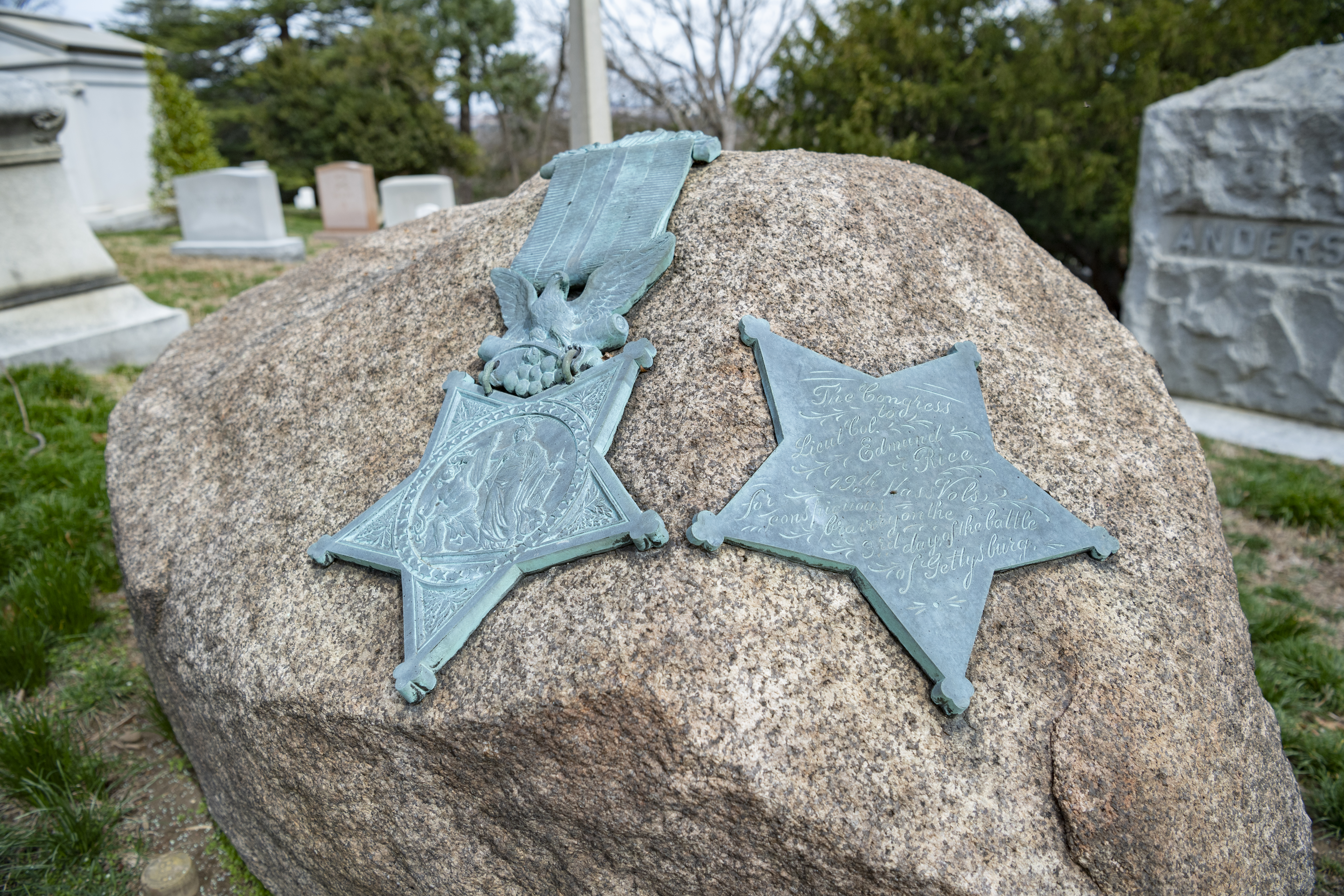
Grave at Arlington National Cemetery

Rice retired on August 14, 1903, with the rank of brigadier general. He became a member of the Medal of Honor Legion, Military Order of the Loyal Legion, Grand Army of the Republic, Society of Prisoners of War, Sons of the Revolution, Sons of the American Revolution, Society of the Army of the Potomac, and the General Society of the War of 1812. General Rice served as Grand Marshal of Ceremonies at the Louisiana Purchase Exposition in 1904, and he spent the summer of 1905 with his daughter Corinne and her husband. He died "very suddenly" of heart failure "while sitting in a hammock" at Wakefield, Massachusetts, on July 20, 1906, lay in state in the Hall of Flags of the State House in Boston, and was buried in Section 3 of Arlington National Cemetery. His wife, Elizabeth H. Rice (1849–1919) is buried with him. His grave is marked by a large rock with a 3.5 foot bronze sculpture of the Medal of Honor draped over the boulder with the inscription, "The Congress to lieut.-Col. Edmund Rice, 19th Mass. Volunteers, for conspicuous bravery on the 3rd day of the battle of Gettysburg."

== Family relations and genealogy ==
Rice's first cousin Edward Everett Rice was a renowned theater producer in New York City. He was a direct descendant of the early English immigrant, Edmund Rice as follows:

- Brigadier General Edmund Rice, son of
  - Moses Maynard Rice (May 12, 1811 – February 14, 1861), son of
    - Edmund Rice (1785–1860), son of
    - Edmund Rice (1755–1841), son of
    - Edmund Rice (1725–1796), son of
      - Jason Rice (1692–1730), son of
      - Edmund Rice (1653–1719), son of
      - Edward Rice (1622–1712), son of
        - Edmund Rice (1594–1663)

== Medal of Honor citation ==
Medal of Honor 1862–1896 version

Rank and organization: Major, 19th Massachusetts Infantry. Place and date: At Gettysburg, Pa., July 3, 1863. Entered service at: Boston, Mass. Birth: Brighton, Mass. Date of issue: October 6, 1891.

Citation:

Conspicuous bravery on the third day of the battle on the countercharge against Pickett's division where he fell severely wounded within the enemy's lines.

== Other military awards ==
In addition to the Medal of Honor, General Rice was entitled to the following military awards:

- Civil War Campaign Medal
- Indian Campaign Medal
- Spanish Campaign Medal
- Philippine Campaign Medal

== See also ==
- List of Medal of Honor recipients for the Battle of Gettysburg
- List of American Civil War Medal of Honor recipients: Q–S
