= Blackburn's Ford =

Coordinates: 38.80304°N 77.44939°W

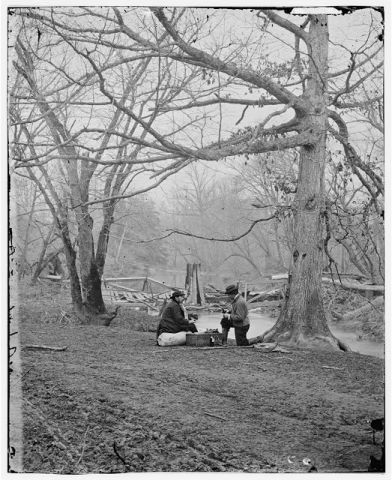
Ruins of railroad bridge at Blackburn's Ford, 1862

Blackburn's Ford was the crossing of Bull Run by Centreville Road between Manassas and Centreville, Virginia, in the United States. It was named after the original owner of the Yorkshire Plantation (McLean's Farm), Col. Richard Blackburn, formerly of Yorkshire, England. The land was acquired in 1854 by Wilmer McLean who owned it until 1867.

== Background ==
Blackburn's Ford, 1862

On July 18, 1861, it was the site of the Battle of Blackburn's Ford, Brig. Gen. Irvin McDowell's initial probe of Confederate defenses in what would become the first major land battle of the Civil War, First Manassas. Due to heavy resistance from the fortified Confederate position that he encountered here, McDowell decided against a direct attack on the Manassas railroad junction and chose instead a flanking maneuver.

During the actual battle on July 21, the ford was again the site of action as Brig. Gen. James Longstreet first crossed the Bull Run but found his position exposed to Union artillery. Later he sent reconnaissance missions that discovered McDowell had sent his forces to cross Sudley Ford on the Confederate left. In the final stages of the battle Longstreet again sent forces across the ford in an attempt to rout the retreating Union Army but rear guard action halted his advance.

Modern day Virginia State Route 28 crosses Bull Run near Blackburn's Ford. The area still bears the name Yorkshire.
