= 1st Virginia Infantry Regiment =

Confederate States Army unit

- Flag of Virginia, 1861
- Active: May 1861 – Spring 1865
- Disbanded: April 1865
- Country: Confederate States of America
- Allegiance: Virginia
- Branch: Confederate States Army
- Role: Infantry
- Engagements: First Battle of Bull Run; Battle of Williamsburg; Seven Days' Battles; Second Battle of Bull Run; Battle of Fredericksburg; Battle of Gettysburg; Battle of Cold Harbor; Siege of Petersburg; Battle of Five Forks; Battle of Sailor's Creek

The 1st Virginia Infantry Regiment was an infantry regiment raised in the Commonwealth of Virginia for service in the Confederate States Army during the American Civil War. It fought mostly with the Army of Northern Virginia.

== Organization ==
The 1st Virginia completed its organization at Richmond, Virginia, in May, 1861. At the outbreak of the war it had ten companies, but in April three were detached. Thus the unit contained seven companies from Richmond and in mid-July a company from Washington, D.C. was added. Its first colonel, Patrick T. Moore, was severely wounded on July 18, 1861, in the skirmish at Blackburn's Ford, and Lt. Col. W.H. Fry commanded at the First Battle of Bull Run (First Manassas). The companies (with original commanders) were:

- Co. A (Richmond Grays): Capt. W.M. Elliott – Detached to Norfolk, Virginia, during April, 1861 and assigned to the 12th Virginia Infantry as Co. G, August 31, 1861.
- Co. B (Richmond City Guard): Capt. R. Harrison – Captain J.K. Lee was killed at Blackburn's Ford on July 18, 1861.
- Co. C (Montgomery Guard): Capt. J. Dooley
- Co. D (Old Dominion Guard): Capt. J. Griswold
- Co. E (1st) (Richmond Light Infantry Blues): Capt. O.J. Wise – Sent to Fredericksburg, Virginia and later assigned to the 46th Virginia Infantry, prior to the Battle of First Manassas.
- Co. E (2nd) (Washington Volunteers): Capt. C.K. Sherman – Temporarily attached to the regiment during the middle of July and transferred to the 7th Virginia Infantry as Company F in April 1862.
- Co. F (1st) (Cary's Company): Capt. R.M. Cary – Sent to Fredericksburg and assigned to the 21st Virginia Infantry, under the command of Capt. R.H. Cunningham, Jr., prior to First Manassas.
- Co. F (2nd) (Beauregard Rifles): Capt. F.B. Schaeffer – Served in a provisional battalion (Schaeffer's Battalion) during First Bull Run and was subsequently assigned to the regiment on July 23, 1861. The company was relieved from duty on September 7 and redesignated as Company C, 1st Regiment Virginia Artillery. On November 13, 1861, the company was mustered out of service.
- Co. G (Gordan's Company): Capt. W.H. Gordan
- Co. H (1st) (Howitzer Battery): Capt G.W. Randolph – In early May, the company left the regiment and was expanded into a battalion of three companies under then-Maj. G. W. Randolph.
- Co. H (2nd) (Richmond Greys, Company B): Capt. F.J. Boggs
- Co. I (Taylor's' Company): Capt. W.O. Taylor
- Co. K (Virginia Rifles, at one time German Rifles): Capt. F. Miller – Disbanded when the regiment was reorganised in April 1862.
- Fayette Artillery: Capt. H.C. Cabell – Detached and assigned to John Magruder's command on the Virginia Peninsula.
- Floyd Guard: Capt. G.W. Chambers – Assigned as Co. K, 2nd Virginia Infantry, prior to June 30, 1861.
- Band: Capt. J.B. Smith – Mustered in as Co. I and detached to form the a 13-piece regimental band.
- Drum Corps: Drum Major C.R.M. Pohle – 14 drummers including the drummer on duty with the Richmond Greys in Norfolk. The Drum Corps was mustered in as a body.

== Service ==
It fought at the Battle of First Bull Run (First Manassas) in a brigade under James Longstreet and in August totaled 570 men. During April, 1862, when the regiment was reorganized, it contained only six companies. The 1st Virginia Infantry was assigned to A. P. Hill's, Kemper's, and W. R. Terry's Brigade, Army of Northern Virginia. It was active from the Battle of Williamsburg to the Battle of Gettysburg, except when it was with Longstreet at the Siege of Suffolk, Virginia. Later the unit was involved in the capture of Plymouth, the conflicts at Drewry's Bluff and Cold Harbor, the Siege of Petersburg south and north of the James River, and the Appomattox Campaign. This regiment lost twenty-two percent of the 140 engaged at the Battle of Second Bull Run (Second Manassas), had 9 wounded at the Battle of Fredericksburg, and had more than half of the 209 at Gettysburg disabled. Its casualties were 12 killed and 25 wounded at Drewry's Bluff, 1 killed and 77 wounded at the Battle of Five Forks, and 40 captured at the Battle of Sayler's Creek. Only 17 surrendered at Appomattox on April 9, 1865.

== Commanders ==
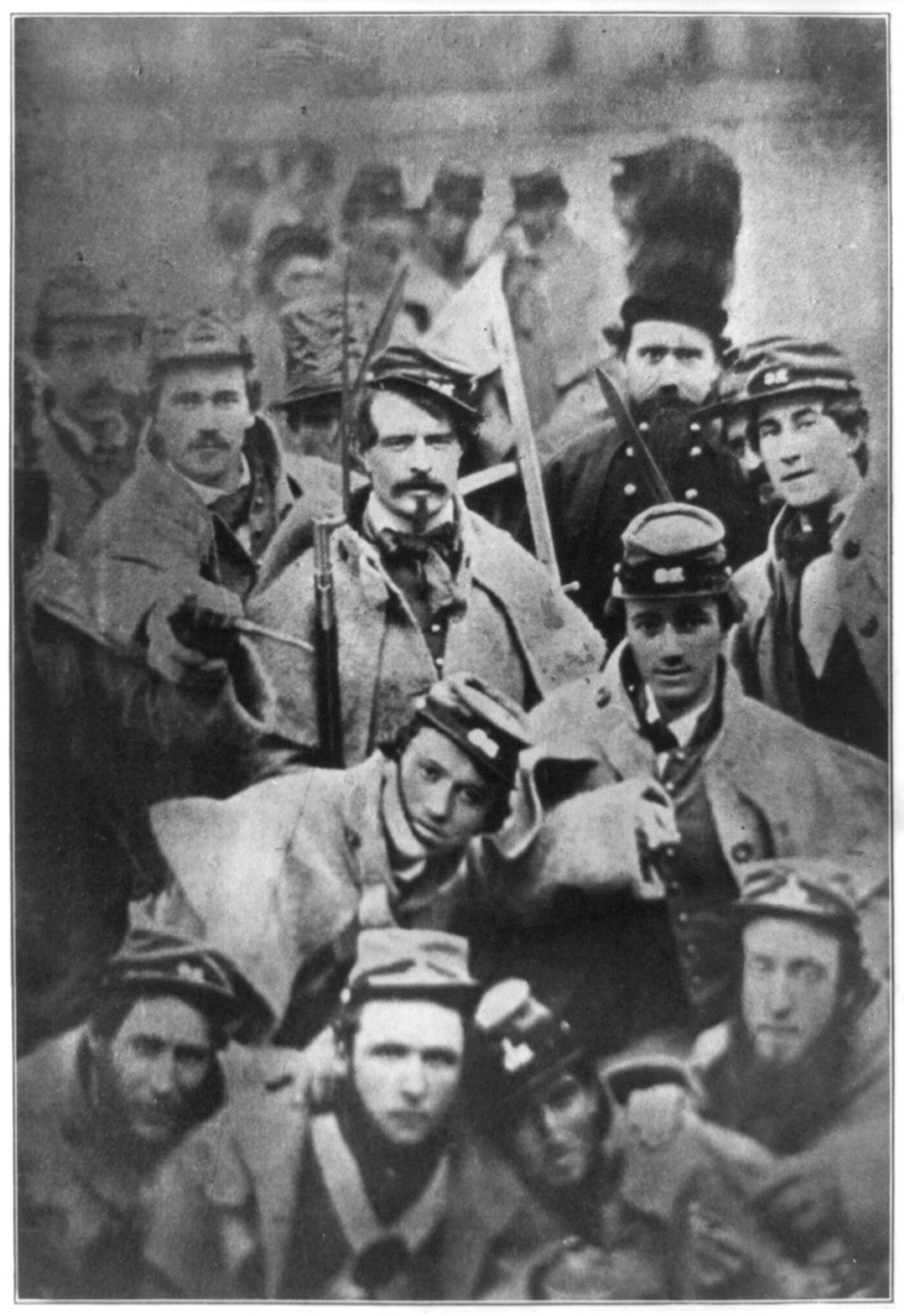
Soldiers from Richmond Grays at execution of abolitionist John Brown in Charles Town, West Virginia 1859

The field officers were Colonels Patrick T. Moore, Franklin G. Skinner, and Lewis B. Williams, Jr; Lieutenant Colonels William H. Fry and Frank H. Langley; and Majors John Dooley, William P. Mumford, George F. Norton, and William H. Palmer.

== See also ==
- List of Virginia Civil War units
