= Lewis B. Williams Jr. =

- Born: September 13, 1833; Virginia, U.S.
- Died: July 3, 1863 (aged 29); Gettysburg, Pennsylvania, U.S.
- Burial place: Hollywood Cemetery; Richmond, Virginia, U.S.
- Military career
- Allegiance: Confederate States of America
- Branch: Confederate States Army
- Service years: 1861 – 1863
- Rank: Colonel
- Commands: 1st Virginia Infantry
- Conflicts: American Civil War; Battle of Williamsburg (WIA) (POW); Battle of Fredericksburg; Battle of Gettysburg †

Lewis Burwell Williams Jr. (September 13, 1833 – July 3, 1863) was a Confederate Colonel during the American Civil War. He was killed during Pickett's Charge during the third day of the Battle of Gettysburg.

== Early life ==
Born in Richmond, Virginia, he was the son of Lewis B. Williams Sr, a Virginian legislator who opposed secession. He graduated from the Virginia Military Institute in 1855.

== Civil War ==
At the outbreak of the Civil War, he was elected a Captain in the 13th Virginia Regiment. he rose to the rank of colonel and commanded the 1st Virginia Infantry Regiment, also known as "The Old First". On May 5, 1862, at the Battle of Williamsburg, he was wounded and captured. After being exchanged a month later, he resumed command of the 1st Virginia, which was part of Brig. General James Kemper's Brigade of Pickett's Division in the Army of Northern Virginia.

== Gettysburg ==
Williams led the 1st Virginia on the third day of the Battle of Gettysburg against the Union position on Cemetery Hill in what is called "Pickett's Charge". Pickett had ordered that officers were to walk. Being ill, he was given permission to ride his horse in the attack. As the Confederate army marched into the open field they came under Federal cannon fire. A shot exploded near Colonel Williams, which threw him from his saddle. He landed on his sword and was mortally wounded. His regiment, now under the command of Lt. Colonel Franklin G. Skinner, continued on toward the Union lines, suffering 80% casualties, before being forced to retreat.

== Burial ==
He was originally buried in Greenmount Cemetery in Baltimore before being reinterred in Hollywood Cemetery in 1896.
