= Romeyn B. Ayres =

United States Army general (1825–1888)

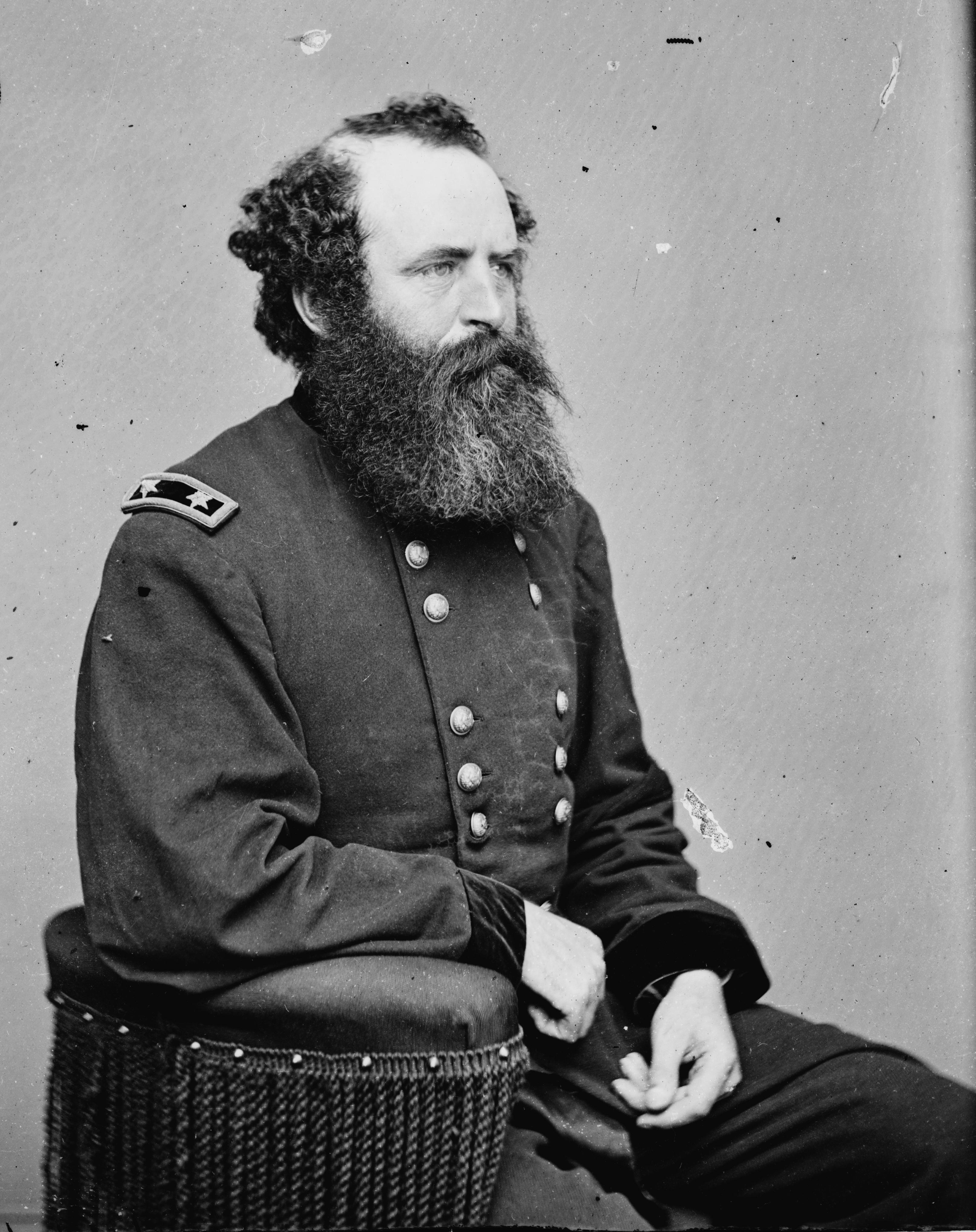
- Romeyn B. Ayres
- Born: December 20, 1825; Manheim, New York, U.S.
- Died: December 4, 1888 (aged 62); Fort Hamilton, New York, U.S.
- Burial place: Arlington National Cemetery
- Military career
- Allegiance: United States of America; Union
- Branch: United States Army; Union Army
- Service years: 1847–1888
- Rank: Brigadier General; Brevet Major General
- Commands: 2nd Division, V Corps; 3rd U.S. Artillery; 2nd U.S. Artillery
- Conflicts: Mexican-American War; American Civil War; Battle of Blackburn's Ford; First Battle of Bull Run; Peninsula campaign; Seven Days Battles; Battle of Antietam; Battle of Fredericksburg; Battle of Chancellorsville; Battle of Gettysburg; New York Draft Riots; Overland Campaign; Battle of Globe Tavern; Battle of Five Forks; Appomattox Campaign

Romeyn Beck Ayres (December 20, 1825 – December 4, 1888) was a Union Army general in the American Civil War.

== Early life ==
Ayres was born at East Creek, New York, along the Mohawk River in Montgomery County. He was the son of a small-town doctor, who trained him in Latin. He graduated from the United States Military Academy in 1847, ranking 22nd in a class of 38, and was commissioned a brevet second lieutenant in the 4th U.S. Artillery. Although graduating in time for the Mexican–American War, Ayres served only on garrison duty in Puebla and Mexico City until 1850, seeing no fighting in the war.

Between the wars, Ayres was stationed at various posts on the frontier and served at the Fort Monroe Artillery School from 1859 to 1861. In 1849 he married Emily Louis Gerry Dearborn in Bangor, Maine. His second wife was Juliet Opie Hopkins Butcher, the daughter of Juliet Opie Hopkins, a woman who later became prominent establishing hospitals for Confederate soldiers in Richmond, Virginia.

== Civil War ==
After the start of the Civil War, Ayres was promoted to captain and commanded a battery in the 5th U.S. Artillery, which he led in the First Bull Run Campaign, and was heavily involved in the Battle of Blackburn's Ford, immediately before the larger First Battle of Bull Run. At First Bull Run, his battery, attached to the brigade of William Tecumseh Sherman, was held in reserve and he did not see action during the battle proper, but distinguished himself by providing cover for retreating Union Army troops pursued by Confederate cavalry.

On October 3, 1861, Ayres was appointed chief of artillery for William F. "Baldy" Smith's division (later designated the 2nd Division of the VI Corps) of the Army of the Potomac. He served in that position in the Peninsula Campaign, the Seven Days Battles, and at the Battle of Antietam. Just before the Battle of Fredericksburg, he was promoted to chief of artillery of the VI Corps as a brigadier general, as of November 29, 1862. At Fredericksburg he commanded the corps artillery stationed across the Rappahannock River on Falmouth Heights.

While recuperating from an injury caused when his horse fell, Ayres considered his military career and realized that artillery officers had a much slower rate of promotion than their colleagues in the infantry. Thus, he arranged for a transfer and became a brigade commander in the 2nd Division of the V Corps as of April 21, 1863. This division was known as the Regular Division because it consisted almost entirely of regular army (versus state volunteers) soldiers and he led its 1st Brigade in the Battle of Chancellorsville. On the first day of the battle (May 1, 1863) his brigade formed the left flank of Sykes' division when it engaged Maj. Gen. Lafayette McLaws' division on the Orange Turnpike. Sykes' division was forced to retreat after being attacked on the right flank by Maj. Gen. Robert E. Rodes' division.

In the Gettysburg campaign, as part of a general shuffling of senior officers when Maj. Gen. George Meade was promoted from commander of the V Corps to be commander of the Army of the Potomac and Maj. Gen. George Sykes took command of the corps, Ayres was promoted to command the Regular Division. He had risen to division command quickly for an officer with little infantry experience. At the Battle of Gettysburg, he did not have an opportunity to shine in his new assignment. His division arrived on the battlefield around midday on the second day of battle, July 2, 1863. After a brief rest in camp near Power's Hill, two brigades from his division were sent to reinforce Union troops from Maj. Gen. John C. Caldwell's division (II Corps), which was counterattacking Confederate forces in the Wheatfield. Due to a great Confederate assault nearby at the Peach Orchard, Caldwell's division retreated, because his two brigades were at risk of being surrounded. Ayres' troops were forced to retreat as well, suffering heavy casualties. Nevertheless, Ayres received praise for his performance and he received a brevet promotion to major in the regular army for his actions at Gettysburg. After the battle, the Regular Division was sent in New York City to suppress the draft riots there.

In March 1864, the Army of the Potomac was reorganized, reducing the number of corps commanders, and subordinates down the chain of command were affected. Ayres was reduced to commanding the 4th Brigade of the 1st Division, V Corps. He led the brigade in Lt. Gen. Ulysses S. Grant's Overland Campaign of 1864. He received command of a new 2nd Division of the V Corps for the Siege of Petersburg. On August 1, 1864, he received a brevet promotion to major general for his contributions in these campaigns; he received particular commendations and brevet promotions for Weldon Railroad and Five Forks. Ayres continued to lead his division through the Appomattox Campaign and the Confederate surrender.

By the summer of 1864, the Regular Division no longer existed because it was hardly above brigade strength. Ayres was asked after the war if any of the regular troops he'd commanded were still serving. He replied "I had a division of regulars once. I buried half of them at Gettysburg and the other half in the Wilderness. There's no regulars left."

== Postbellum ==
After the war, Ayres commanded a division in the Provisional Corps, and then commanded the District of the Shenandoah Valley until April 30, 1866, when he was mustered out of the volunteer service. As part of the general reduction of ranks that was typical following many American wars, Ayres returned to the regular army with the rank of lieutenant colonel and he performed mostly garrison duty in a number of posts in the South, including Little Rock, Arkansas, Jackson Barracks, New Orleans, Louisiana, and Key West, Florida. In 1877 he commanded troops suppressing the railroad strikes in Maryland and Pennsylvania, and in 1879 he was promoted to colonel of the 2nd U.S. Artillery.

Ayres died on duty on December 4, 1888, in Fort Hamilton, New York, at 62 years of age. He was buried at Arlington National Cemetery, in Arlington, Virginia.

== See also ==
- List of American Civil War generals (Union)

== Sources ==
- Eicher, John H., and David J. Eicher. Civil War High Commands. Stanford, CA: Stanford University Press, 2001. ISBN 0-8047-3641-3.
- Tagg, Larry. The Generals of Gettysburg. Campbell, CA: Savas Publishing, 1998. ISBN 1-882810-30-9.
- Marquis Who's Who, Inc. Who Was Who in American History, the Military. Chicago: Marquis Who's Who, 1975. p. 49 ISBN 0837932017 OCLC 657162692
