= Patrick Theodore Moore =

Confederate States Army brigadier general

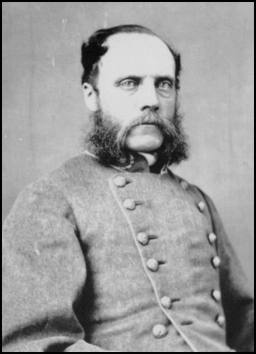
- Brig. Gen. Patrick T. Moore
- Born: September 22, 1821; Galway, Ireland, U.K.
- Died: February 19, 1883 (aged 61); Richmond, Virginia
- Burial place: Richmond, Virginia
- Military career
- Allegiance: Confederate States of America
- Branch: Confederate States Army
- Service years: 1861–1865
- Rank: Brigadier General
- Commands: 1st Virginia Infantry; 1st Brigade / VA Reserve Forces
- Conflicts: American Civil War: Battle of Blackburn's Ford; Battle of Seven Pines; Siege of Petersburg

Patrick Theodore Moore (September 22, 1821 – February 19, 1883) was an Irish-born Confederate States Army brigadier general during the American Civil War. As colonel leading the 1st Virginia Infantry Regiment, he was severely wounded at the Battle of Blackburn's Ford on July 18, 1861, and was incapacitated for further field service. Thereafter, he served as an aide-de-camp, first to General Joseph E. Johnston and then to Lieutenant General James Longstreet, a judge advocate general on court martial duty and a brigade commander of Virginia Reserves (local defense forces) in the Department of Richmond. He was a merchant and Virginia militia officer before the war and an insurance agent after the conflict.

== Early life ==
Patrick T. Moore was born on September 22, 1821, in Galway, Ireland. His family moved to Canada in 1835, then to Massachusetts, where his father was British consul. Moore moved to Virginia in 1850 where he worked as a merchant and was a captain in the Virginia militia. By 1860 he was resident in Richmond's Ward 2. Along with his wife and four children, he owned five female slaves.

== American Civil War ==
After the Virginia secession convention effectively removed Virginia from the Union even before the ratification vote of the people, Patrick T. Moore entered Virginia state militia service as colonel of the 1st Virginia Militia Regiment on April 21, 1861. He became colonel of the 1st Virginia Infantry of the Virginia Provisional Army on June 15, 1861. After the Virginia units were formally transferred to the Confederate States Army service he became colonel of the 1st Virginia Infantry Regiment on July 1, 1861.

Moore received a head wound at the Battle of Blackburn's Ford, Virginia on July 18, 1861, three days before the main Battle of First Bull Run (First Manassas), which incapacitated him for further field duty.

Moore served as aide-de-camp to General Joseph E. Johnston between October 1861 and May 31, 1862, and, after Johnston was wounded at the Battle of Seven Pines, as aide-de-camp to Lieutenant General James Longstreet between May 31, 1861, and July 1862. Moore's regiment had been in Longstreet's brigade during the First Bull Run Campaign. In December 1862, Moore was appointed judge advocate general for the Confederate Trans-Allegheny Department and began two years of court martial duty. On April 28, 1863, he was appointed colonel, CSA, and judge advocate general. In January 1864, he became judge advocate general for the Department of Richmond. From May 18, 1864, to December 1864, he was a brigade commander of the Reserve Forces of Virginia, which he helped organize under the direction of Brigadier General James L. Kemper. On September 20, 1864, Moore was promoted to brigadier general. Between December 1864 and April 1865, he was in command of Brigade 1 of the Virginia Reserve Forces (local defense troops) in the Department of Richmond.

Moore apparently did not evacuate Richmond with the brigade because he was not captured with Lieutenant General Richard S. Ewell's local defense forces at the Battle of Sayler's Creek on April 6, 1865, and he was not paroled at Appomattox Court House, Virginia, on April 9, 1865, or the days immediately thereafter. He was later paroled at Manchester, Virginia, now part of Richmond, Virginia, on April 30, 1865. He was pardoned on June 14, 1865.

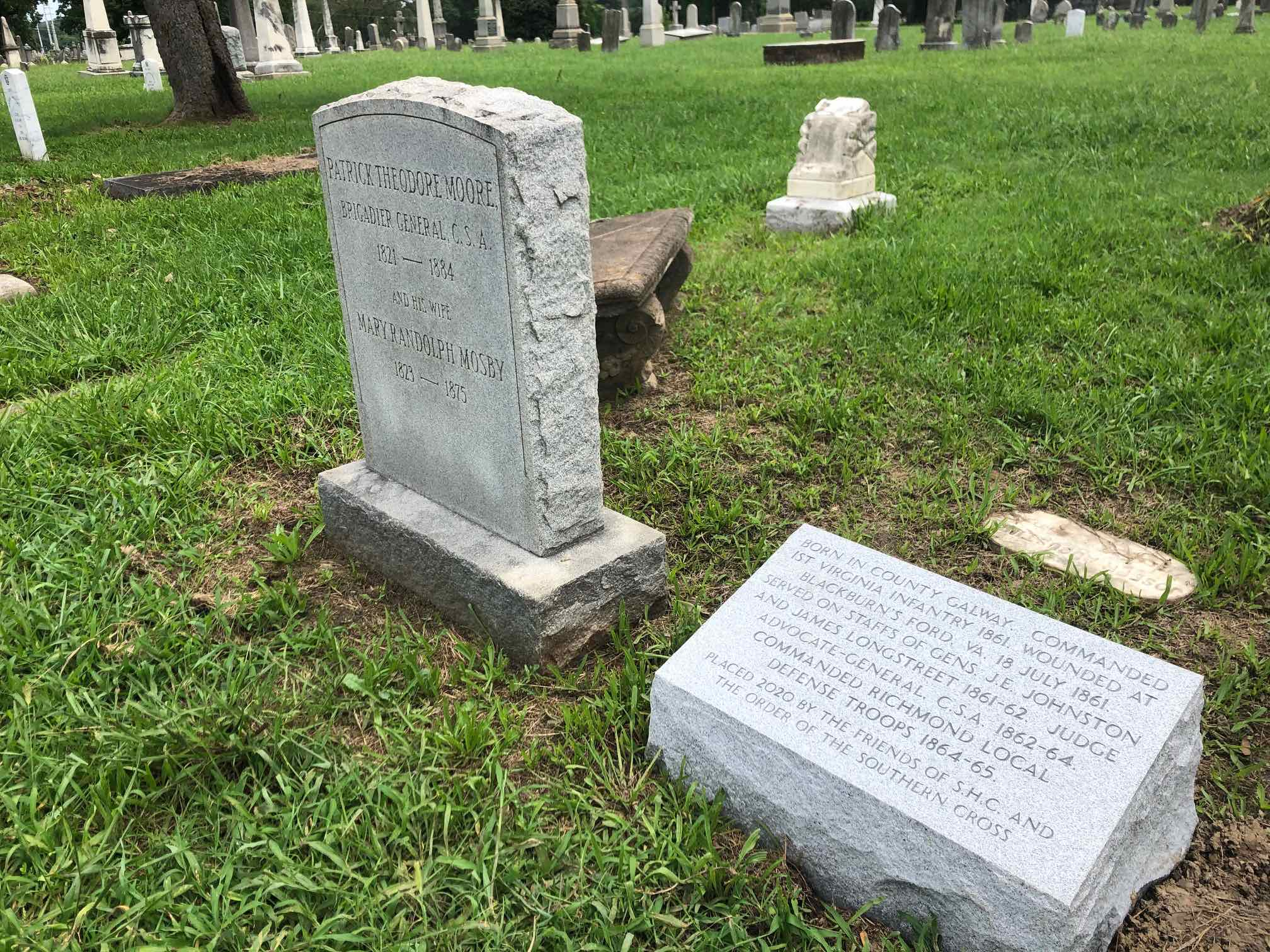

== Aftermath ==
Moore became an insurance agent at Richmond, Virginia, after the war. Patrick T. Moore died on February 19, 1883, at Richmond Virginia. He is buried at Shockoe Hill Cemetery, Richmond.

== See also ==
- List of American Civil War generals (Confederate)
