= Battle of Blackburn's Ford =

Battle of the American Civil War

Coordinates: 38°48′15″N 77°26′57″W

- Part of the American Civil War
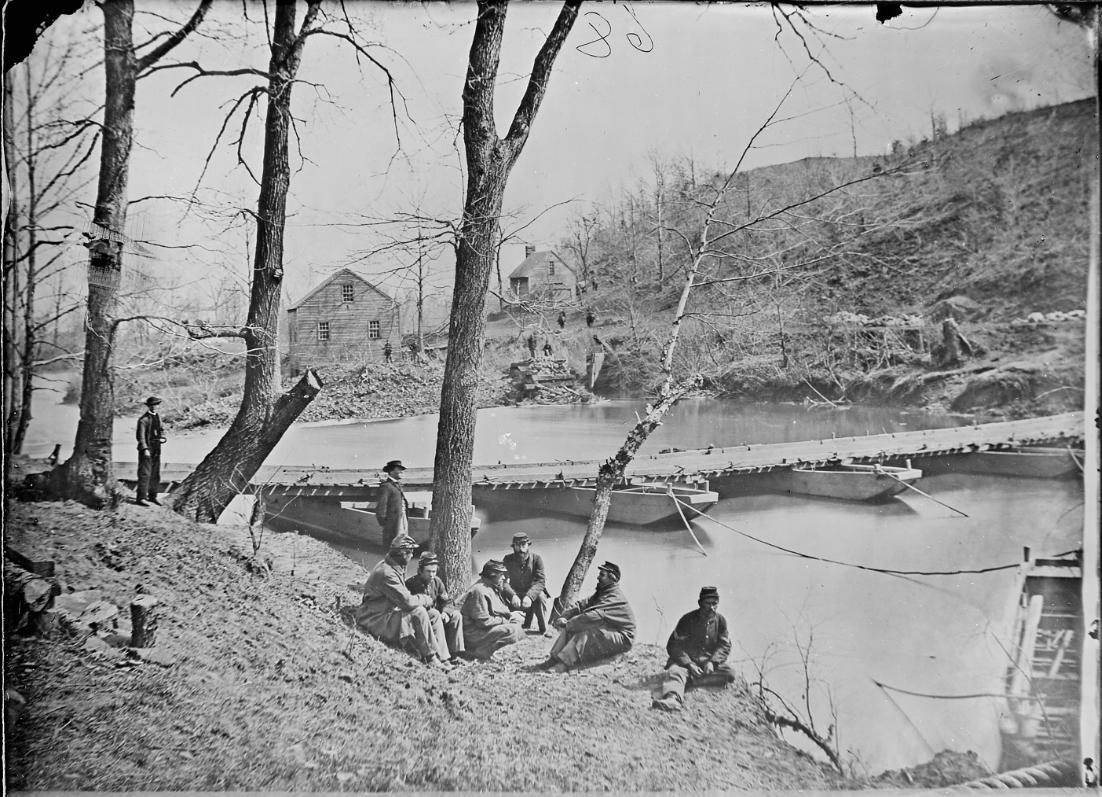
- Blackburn's Ford
Date	July 18, 1861
Location	Blackburn's Ford along Bull Run Creek in Virginia
Result	Confederate victory

Belligerents
United States (Army of Northeastern Virginia)	CSA (Confederacy) (Army of the Potomac)

Commanders and leaders
Irvin McDowell; Daniel Tyler; Israel B. Richardson	P.G.T. Beauregard; James Longstreet; Jubal Early

Strength
c. 3,000	c. 5,100

Casualties and losses
83	68

The Battle of Blackburn's Ford (also known as the Skirmish at Blackburn's Ford) took place on July 18, 1861, in the Confederate state of Virginia, as part of the Manassas campaign of the American Civil War. Union general Irvin McDowell's Army of Northeastern Virginia was marching south towards the Confederate capital of Richmond, and encountered the Confederate Army of the Potomac under the command of P. G. T. Beauregard. McDowell sent troops from Daniel Tyler's division to probe the Confederate defenses along Bull Run Creek to locate the Confederate left flank. At Blackburn's Ford, the Union troops attempted to cross but Confederate fire broke up the attack. The repulse at Blackburn's Ford led McDowell to seek to attack the Confederates at a different point along their line, leading to the First Battle of Bull Run three days later.

== Background ==
On July 16, 1861, the untried Union Army of Northeastern Virginia under Brigadier General (Brig. Gen.) Irvin McDowell, 35,000 strong, marched out of the Washington, D.C., defenses to give battle to the Confederate Army of the Potomac, which was concentrated around the vital railroad junction at Manassas. Moving slowly, the army reached Fairfax Court House on July 17; the next day, McDowell ordered division commander Brig. Gen. Daniel Tyler to look for a fording point across Bull Run Creek and to "keep up the impression that we are moving on Manassas".

The Confederates, about 22,000 men under the command of Brig. Gen. P.G.T. Beauregard, were concentrated near Bull Run Creek, with detachments spread north of the creek to observe the Union troops. When McDowell started his advance from Washington, the Confederate detachments slowly retreated and rejoined the main body. Beauregard expected to be attacked either on the 18th or the 19th near Mitchell's Ford; meanwhile, he continued to ask for reinforcements, especially from Joseph E. Johnston's army in the Shenandoah Valley.

== Battle ==
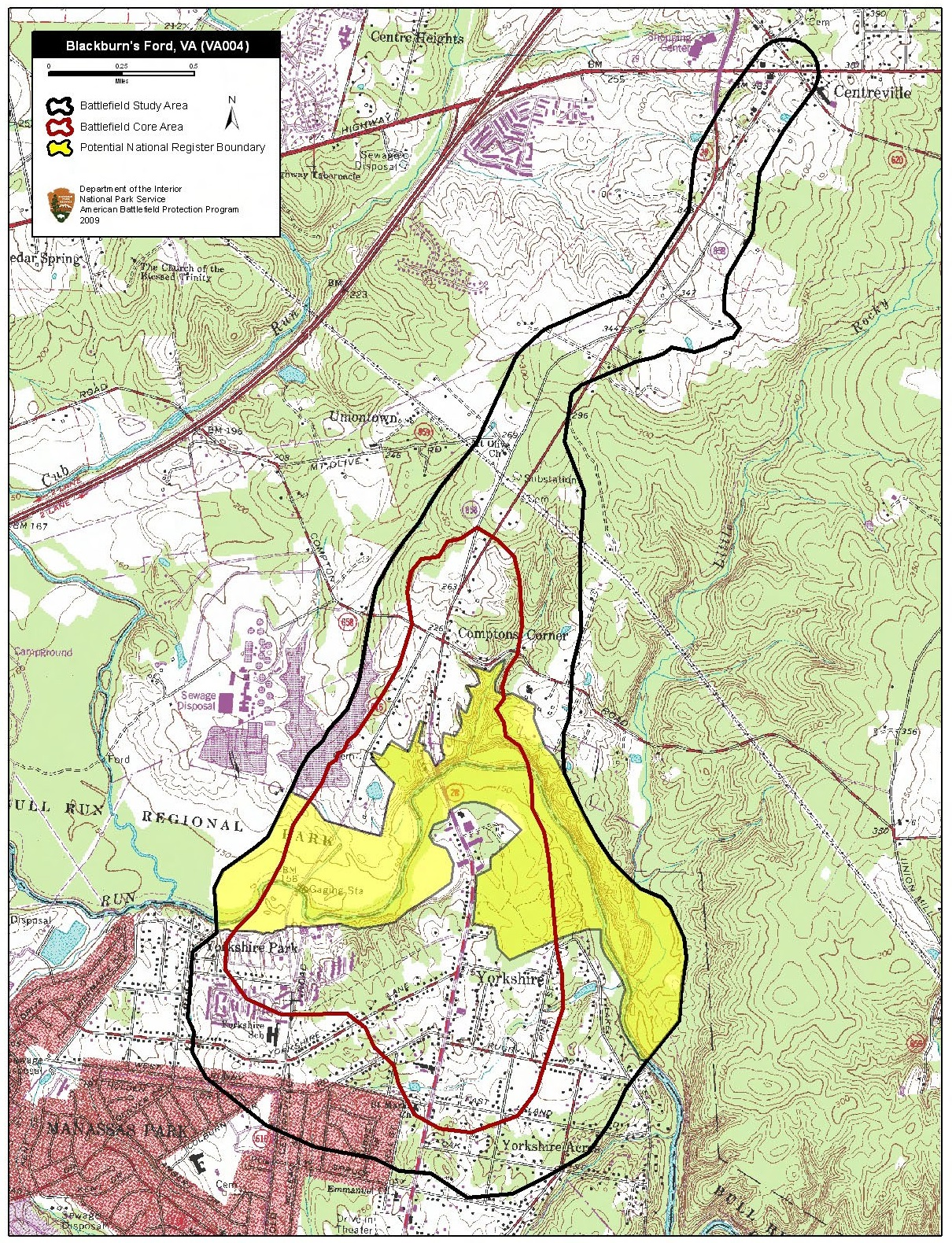
Map of Blackburn's Ford Battlefield core and study areas by the American Battlefield Protection Program

On July 18, Tyler advanced to Centreville and was informed by local residents that the Confederates had retreated from the town. Milledge Bonham's troops in particular were reported to have retreated in the direction of Blackburn's Ford. Tyler then marched southeast to Mitchell's Ford and Blackburn's Ford, arriving at the latter about 11 a.m. Looking south across the stream, Tyler believed that the road to Manassas Junction was mostly clear, but he failed to see the Confederate brigade of Brig. Gen. James Longstreet concealed in the woods behind the ford. He ordered two howitzers under Captain (Capt.) Romeyn B. Ayres to bombard the Confederates he could see—guns of the Alexandria Artillery and the Washington Artillery—but the fire had no visible effect. As a result, Tyler ordered Colonel (Col.) Israel B. Richardson and part of his brigade forward.

Richardson sent out a portion of the 1st Massachusetts Infantry towards the Confederate line. The Massachusetts regiment wore gray uniforms instead of the standard Union blue, which caused initial confusion, as the Confederates were also clad in gray. After the 1st Massachusetts, Richardson deployed the 1st Michigan Infantry, 2nd Michigan Infantry, 3rd Michigan Infantry, and 12th New York Infantry regiments. The Union advance met initial resistance from the 1st Virginia Infantry, 11th Virginia Infantry, and 17th Virginia Infantry regiments of Longstreet's brigade. Tyler ordered Ayres to move his guns closer to the action, accompanied by cavalry, and he sent the rest of Richardson's brigade toward the ford. The 12th New York Infantry began to retreat under heavy fire, exposing the rest of Richardson's line, particularly the 1st Massachusetts, to Confederate fire. Ayres, his battery having used up much of its ammunition, withdrew his two howitzers from the field. During the exchange, Union cannons fired an estimated 415 shots, and the Confederate cannons fired an estimated 310. Tyler realized that the Confederates had a strong force at the ford, and ordered the rest of his infantry to withdraw. After Richardson's brigade had completed its withdrawal, a second of Tyler's brigades commanded by William T. Sherman arrived on the field, although Sherman's brigade was only subjected to light shelling.

Col. Jubal A. Early arrived with his Confederate brigade after marching two miles north from Beauregard's headquarters at Wilmer McLean's house. The availability of this additional firepower completed the Confederate victory, and a reinforced Washington Artillery kept the Union troops under fire as they retreated. Col. Patrick T. Moore of the 1st Virginia Infantry, later a Confederate brigadier general, received a severe head wound in the skirmish and was incapacitated for further field service.

Tyler's Union division suffered 83 casualties in the action, while the Confederate commanders noted only 68 killed and wounded.

== Aftermath ==
The failed reconnaissance-in-force at Blackburn's Ford led McDowell to decide against a frontal assault along Bull Run Creek. He decided to attempt to cross the stream beyond the Confederate left flank, the maneuver he employed at the First Battle of Bull Run on July 21. The resulting battle ended in a defeat for McDowell's Union army, although the Confederates weren't organized enough to provide a proper pursuit. Both Longstreet and Early later claimed that Blackburn's Ford "went a long way towards winning the victory of the 21st, for it gave our troops confidence in themselves". Two Union soldiers, both from the 12th New York, would later be awarded the Medal of Honor for their actions at Blackburn's Ford.

In June 1994, bodies from the 1st Massachusetts Infantry were found and later re-interred.

Today, the site of the skirmish is marked with an interpretive marker set by the Virginia Civil War Trails organization. The marker is located at the site of the old ford.
