= Yorkshire, Virginia =

- CDP
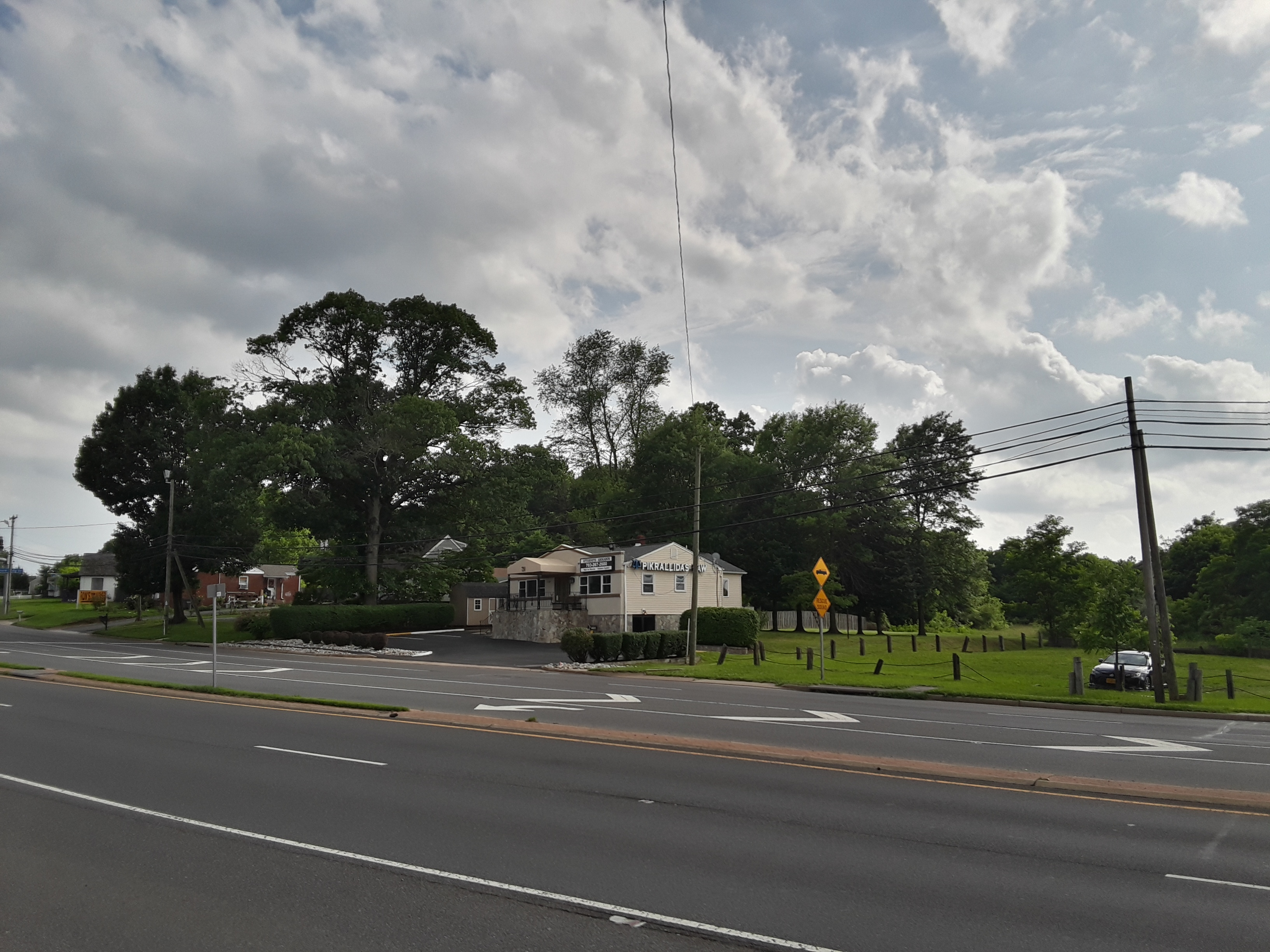
- Roadside scene in Yorkshire, May 2024

- Location in Prince William County and the state of Virginia.
- Coordinates: 38°47′17″N 77°27′12″W
- Country: United States
- State: Virginia
- County: Prince William

Area
  - Total: 2.4 sq mi (6.1 km^{2})
  - Land: 2.4 sq mi (6.1 km^{2})
  - Water: 0 sq mi (0.0 km^{2})
- Elevation: 213 ft (65 m)

Population (2000)
  - Total: 6,732
  - Density: 2,840/sq mi (1,096.7/km^{2})
- Time zone: UTC−5 (Eastern (EST))
  - Summer (DST): UTC−4 (EDT)
- Area codes: 703, 571
- FIPS code: 51-88176
- GNIS feature ID: 1474359

Yorkshire is a census-designated place (CDP) in Prince William County, Virginia, United States. The population was 10,992 at the 2020 census.

== Geography ==
Yorkshire is located at 38°47′17″N 77°27′12″W (38.787928, −77.453236).

According to the United States Census Bureau, the CDP has a total area of 2.4 square miles (6.1 km^{2}), all land.

== Demographics ==
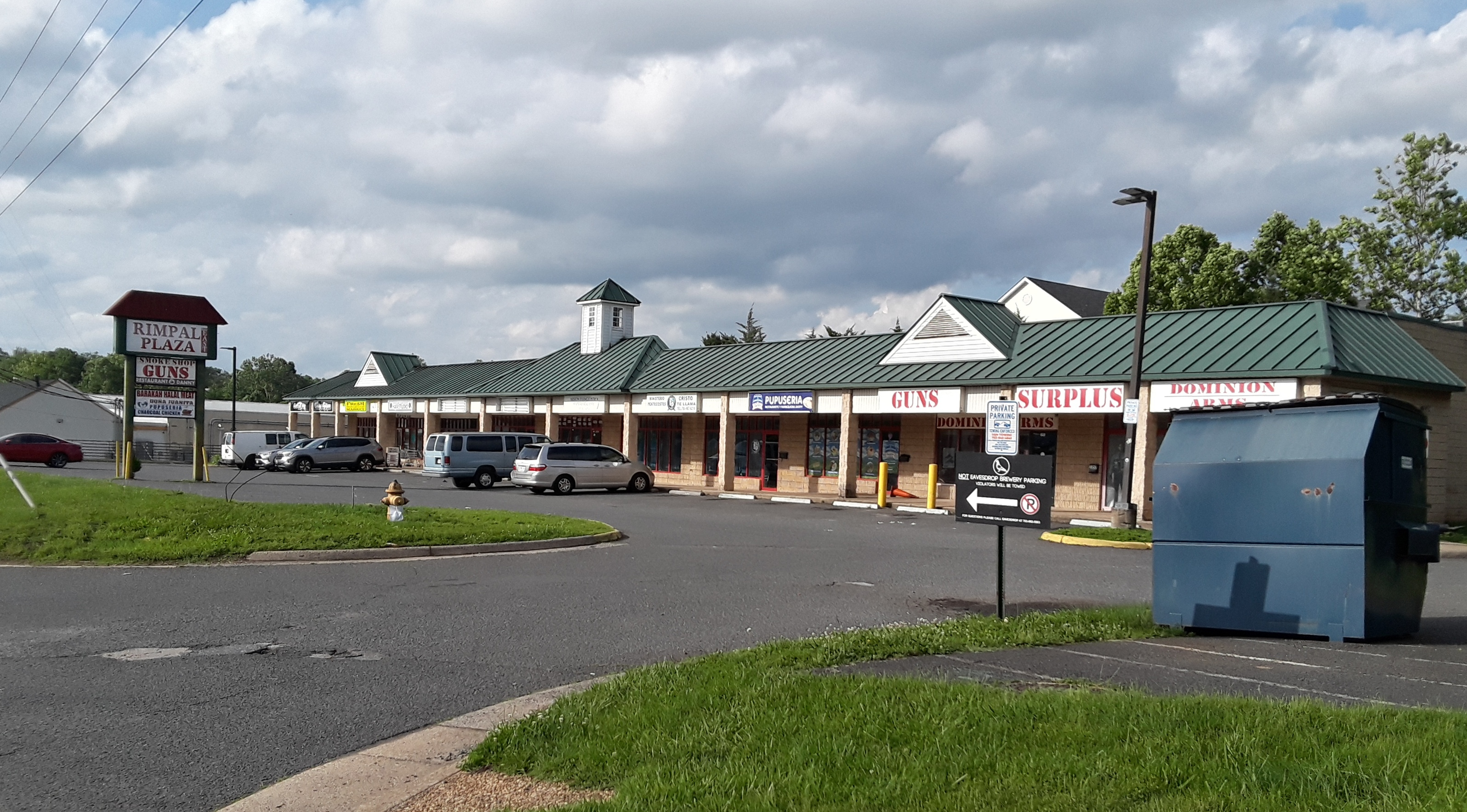
Rimpal Plaza East shopping center in Yorkshire, May 2024

=== 2020 census ===
As of the 2020 census, Yorkshire had a population of 10,992. The median age was 32.2 years. 27.9% of residents were under the age of 18 and 7.4% of residents were 65 years of age or older. For every 100 females there were 102.1 males, and for every 100 females age 18 and over there were 101.3 males age 18 and over.

100.0% of residents lived in urban areas, while 0.0% lived in rural areas.

There were 3,192 households in Yorkshire, of which 47.7% had children under the age of 18 living in them. Of all households, 53.3% were married-couple households, 18.0% were households with a male householder and no spouse or partner present, and 21.5% were households with a female householder and no spouse or partner present. About 15.1% of all households were made up of individuals and 3.5% had someone living alone who was 65 years of age or older.

There were 3,290 housing units, of which 3.0% were vacant. The homeowner vacancy rate was 0.8% and the rental vacancy rate was 2.9%.

Racial composition as of the 2020 census
Race	Number	Percent
White	3,189	29.0%
Black or African American	1,081	9.8%
American Indian and Alaska Native	127	1.2%
Asian	1,513	13.8%
Native Hawaiian and Other Pacific Islander	3	0.0%
Some other race	3,586	32.6%
Two or more races	1,493	13.6%
Hispanic or Latino (of any race)	5,295	48.2%

=== 2000 census ===
As of the 2000 census, there were 6,732 people, 2,266 households, and 1,663 families residing in the CDP. The population density was 2,835.2 inhabitants per square mile (1,094.7/km^{2}). There were 2,332 housing units at an average density of 982.1 per square mile (379.2/km^{2}). The racial makeup of the CDP was 75.73% White, 8.53% African American, 0.42% Native American, 2.39% Asian, 0.10% Pacific Islander, 8.33% from other races, and 4.50% from two or more races. Hispanic or Latino of any race were 18.87% of the population. There were 2,266 households, out of which 41.0% had children under the age of 18 living with them, 52.5% were married couples living together, 12.8% had a female householder with no husband present, and 26.6% were non-families. 18.5% of all households were made up of individuals, and 2.9% had someone living alone who was 65 years of age or older. The average household size was 2.97 and the average family size was 3.32.

In the CDP, the population was spread out, with 29.1% under the age of 18, 9.7% from 18 to 24, 38.9% from 25 to 44, 17.5% from 45 to 64, and 4.8% who were 65 years of age or older. The median age was 31 years. For every 100 females, there were 106.9 males. For every 100 females age 18 and over, there were 111.3 males.

The median income for a household in the CDP was $52,301, and the median income for a family was $51,989. Males had a median income of $37,854 versus $27,705 for females. The per capita income for the CDP was $19,841. About 5.6% of families and 7.3% of the population were below the poverty line, including 11.5% of those under age 18 and 4.6% of those age 65 or over.
