= 6th Massachusetts Volunteer Infantry Regiment (Spanish–American War) =

Unit that fought in the Spanish–American War

The 6th Massachusetts Volunteer Infantry Regiment was reconstituted in early 1898 as a unit of volunteers to fight in the Spanish–American War, under the command of Colonel Edmund Rice. The unit should not be confused with the 6th Infantry Regiment of Regulars, which also fought in the war, though in the Philippines and Cuba.

6th Massachusetts deployed to Puerto Rico, landed at Guanica and worked its way east and inland to Ponce and Arecibo. In October of that year, it returned to Massachusetts and was disbanded. The unit's experience in the Spanish–American War was recorded by Lance-Corporal George King of the regiment's Concord Company in his letters home, which he later published in 1929.

== Bibliography ==
- King, George G. Letters of a Volunteer in the Spanish–American War. Chicago: Hawkins & Loomis, 1929.
