= Virginia State Route 161 =

Highway in Richmond, Virginia, United States

State Route 161

Route information
- Maintained by VDOT
- Length: 13.84 mi (22.27 km)
- Existed: 1933–present

Major junctions
- South end: I-95 in southern Richmond
- US 1 / US 301 in Richmond; US 360 in Richmond; US 60 in Richmond; SR 195 Toll in Richmond; US 33 / US 250 in Richmond; I-64 / I-95 in Richmond
- North end: US 1 near Lakeside

Location
- Country: United States
- State: Virginia

Highway system
- Virginia Routes; Interstate; US; Primary; Secondary; Byways; History; HOT lanes
← SR 160	→ SR 162

State Route 161 is a primary state highway in and near Richmond, Virginia, United States. It extends from an interchange with Interstate 95 (I-95) in the independent city of Richmond north to an intersection with U.S. Route 1 (US 1) in the Lakeside area of central Henrico County.

For a portion of its history, the road served as an early western highway bypass of the downtown area of the City of Richmond through portions of Chesterfield and Henrico counties. Known during that period as the area's "Belt Boulevard", the name is still applied to some streets along the former bypass routing. SR 161 now located entirely in the City of Richmond and Henrico County.

== Route description ==
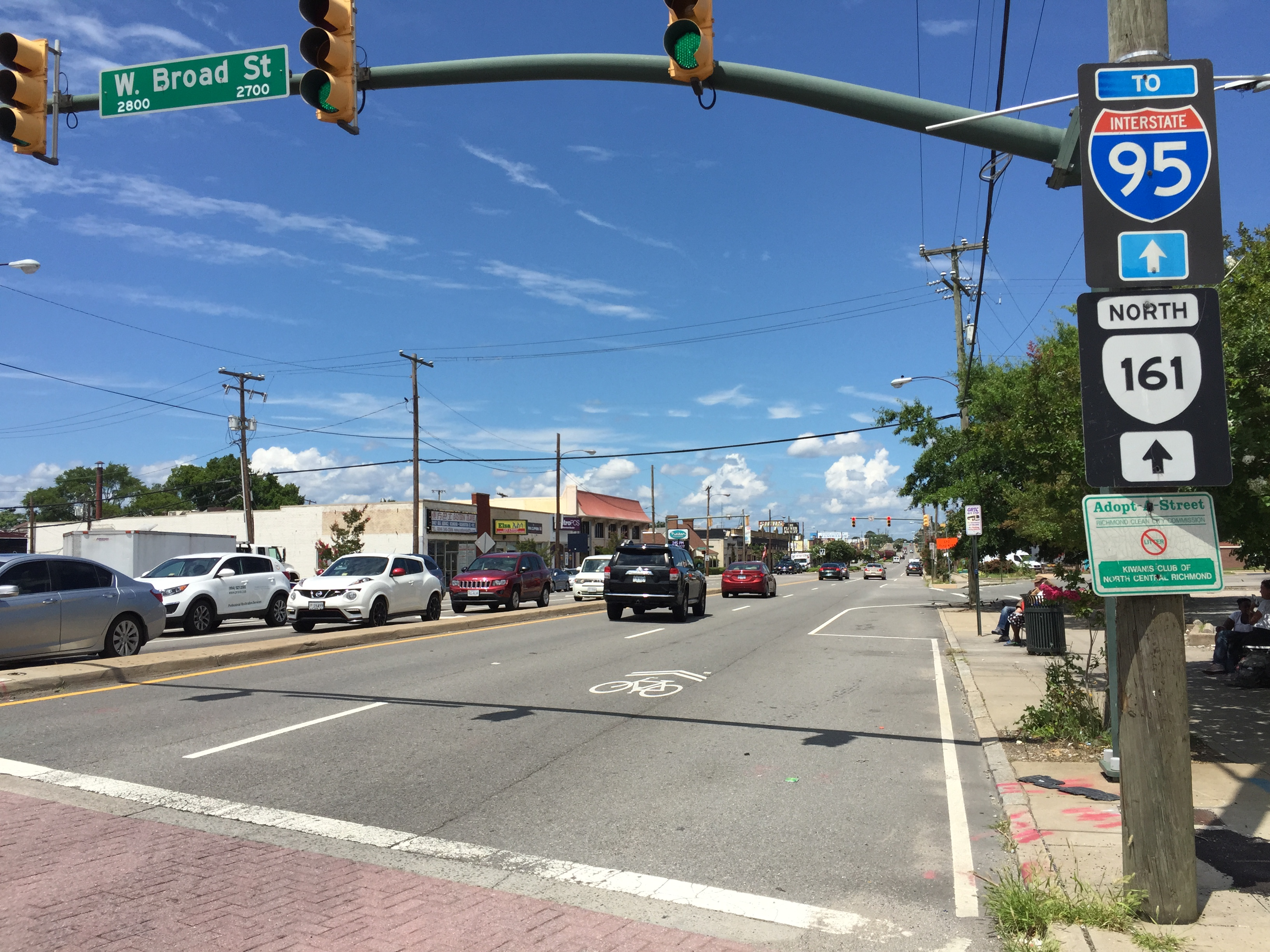
View north along SR 161 at US 33 and US 250 in Richmond

=== Southside Richmond ===
SR 161 begins at a partial cloverleaf interchange from I-95 exit 69 to an intersection with Walmsley Boulevard and Commerce Road. The state highway curves right onto Commerce Road then turning left at Bells Road near Phillip Morris USA. The state route curves through the Phillip Morris area then crosses over CSX's Bellwood Subdivision to an intersection with Jefferson Davis Highway (US 1/US 301). SR 161 keeps straight across the Jefferson Davis area, crosses over CSX's Clopton Lead, then turns right onto Belt Boulevard near the Parnell Industrial Area. The state route briefly parallels CSX's North End Subdivision as it passes its former alignment with Terminal Avenue. The state route then pass a partial cloverleaf interchange with Hopkins Road before approaching the Hunter Holmes McGuire Veterans Administration Medical Center at SR 10 (Broad Rock Boulevard). The state route turns right and the two highways run concurrently along four-lane divided Broad Rock Boulevard. The two highways diverge just northwest of McGuire Hospital's entrance. The highway heads northwest towards the former McGuire Circle at US 360 (Hull Street Road) then keeping straight passing Historic Southside Plaza and Circle Shopping Centers. About a mile further northwest is a diamond interchange with US 60 (Midlothian Turnpike) where the highway name changes from Belt Boulevard to Westover Hills Boulevard. The highway keeps straight north past a busy intersection with Forest Hill Avenue in the Westover Hills area before approaching the Toll Boulevard Bridge. The bridge crosses over Norfolk Southern Railway's Richmond District, James River, and CSX's Rivanna Subdivision before reaching the toll plaza.

=== Northside Richmond ===
SR 161 crosses through the toll plaza and curves around Maymont Park on the right, Dogwood Dell on the left and through the south side of William Byrd Park as Park Drive. SR 161 turns right onto a four-lane divided Blanton Avenue. It then passes an intersection with Douglasdale Road which has access to I-195 (Beltline Expressway) and toll SR 76 (Powhite Parkway). The highway reduces to two lanes before curving right to Grant Street and then curving left onto S. Arthur Ashe Boulevard where it is once again a four-lane divided highway. Upon departure of Byrd Park near Boat Lake is an interchange only to the eastbound lanes of Toll SR 195 (Downtown Expressway) to downtown Richmond. To access I-195 (Beltline Expressway) northbound, motorist would have to use Idlewood Avenue's west leg after crossing over the Downtown Expressway. SR 161 approaches a one-way pair SR 147 east of Carytown where the eastbound lanes are known as Cary Street and the westbound: Main Street (east leg) and Ellwood Avenue (west leg). The crossing of Main Street is where SR 161 transitions from South to North Arthur Ashe Boulevard. The state highway continues north passing the Virginia Museum of Fine Arts (SR 315), the eastern terminus of SR 6 (Kensington Avenue), and around the Stonewall Jackson monument on historic Monument Avenue before reaching US 33/US 250 Broad Street. The state highway continues northeast crossing over CSX's Richmond Terminal Subdivision, passing Greyhound Lines Richmond station on the left and The Diamond on the right. Near the Arthur Ashe Athletic Center is an intersection with Robin Hood Road to the east and Ellen Road to the west. To access I-95 south and I-64 east, motorist would use Robin Hood Road. SR 161 keeps straight crossing under I-95/I-64 to its interchange with the north and westbound lanes (I-95 exit 78). Upon reaching the intersection of Westwood Avenue with the southeast leg being Brookland Parkway, the highway changes names to Hermitage Road. The highway then continues north to an intersection with SR 197 (Laburnum Avenue). Until 2004, there was a monument statue of AP Hill in the center of the intersection. The highway heads north through a residential zone to another interchange with I-95 (southbound only) to I-64 (I-95 exit 80) before crossing into Henrico County near Joseph Bryan Park.

=== Henrico County ===
SR 161 enters Henrico County as a four-lane divided highway (Lakeside Avenue) through a local business area to its intersection with Dumbarton Road. The highway heads north through another residential zone and some restaurants toward the intersection with the eastern terminus of SR 356 (Hilliard Road). The north leg of the intersection is the unnumbered Lakeside Avenue to the Lewis Ginter Botanical Garden. SR 161 turns right onto Hilliard Road and heads east to its northern terminus with US 1 (Brook Road).

== History ==
=== An early highway bypass of Richmond ===
In the pre-World War II era, the original Robert E. Lee Memorial Bridge (replaced in the 1980s), crossing the James River at Richmond was a toll bridge. Traffic through Richmond on U.S. Route 1 and 301 was often highly congested with Florida-New York and other east coast travelers. In the city, the path of US 1/301 passed miles of tourist homes along Jefferson Davis Highway south of the river and Chamberlayne Avenue north of the river.

By 1934, a combination of roads known collectively as the "Belt Boulevard" formed a western bypass of Richmond's most congested areas along the US 1/301 corridor, crossing the James River on Richmond's privately owned Boulevard Bridge, a toll bridge built in 1925. The Belt Boulevard offered an alternative to downtown Richmond's traffic, with ends at US 1 south and north of the city limits in Chesterfield and Henrico counties, respectively, at that time. (Part of the route south of the James River was annexed from Chesterfield County in 1944; the remainder in 1970, so the road in that area is now entirely in Richmond).

=== Route description ===
The route began at U.S. Routes 1 and 301 at Terminal Avenue, a location known as "Stop 9" on the Richmond-Petersburg Interurban Electric Railway. A large neon sign and arrow at the intersection of Terminal Avenue and Jefferson Davis Highway on the southwest corner urged northbound motorists to consider the bypass. The sign survived into the 1970s.

It followed Terminal Avenue northwesterly in Chesterfield County to a short road section actually named Belt Boulevard, which it followed about a mile, meeting State Route 10 and sharing it around the north side of the former Speedway which was located at the current site of McGuire Hospital. Resuming its own roadway, Belt Boulevard turned almost due north. It met U.S. Route 360 at McGuire Circle and U.S. Route 60 about a mile further north. In the late 1940s, an overpass for U.S. 60 and a partial cloverleaf interchange was built at this location.

About 1/2 mile north of U.S. 60, the road crossed the original Belt Line railroad tracks, a routing which was itself bypassed by a newer alignment of the belt line by the Atlantic Coast Line Railroad at the time Broad Street Station was opened around 1917.

After crossing the railroad, Belt Boulevard connected with Westover Hills Boulevard. It continued north through the newly developed Westover Hills community and the Forest Hill Avenue commercial corridor to reach the high bluffs along the south side of the James River.

At this location, Belt Boulevard crossed the Southern Railway (along the south bank), the James River, and the Chesapeake and Ohio Railway and James River and Kanawha Canal (along the north bank) via the Boulevard Bridge, with tolls collected initially at a midpoint on the narrow two-lane bridge itself. The road made landfall just east of Maymont Park and climbing the bluff there, wound around a city reservoir through Byrd Park to connect with the south end of Richmond's major connector street known simply as Boulevard (or "The Boulevard"), a major north–south thoroughfare. It followed that roadway north past a statue to honor Christopher Columbus and crossed Monument Avenue, where a statue of Confederate Major General Stonewall Jackson had been erected. After crossing U.S. Route 33 and U.S. Route 250 at Broad Street, about a mile further north it reached Westwood Circle.

The road followed Hermitage Road north, passing another monument for (and the tomb of) Confederate General Ambrose Powell Hill at Laburnum Avenue. the roadway entered Henrico County on Lakeside Avenue near the main entrance to the city's Joseph Bryan Park. It ran through the Lakeside area to Hillard Road and crossing the Richmond-Ashland Railway (an electric interurban) to end at an intersection with Brook Road in Henrico County north of Richmond.

=== Route numbering history ===
The northern portion of the Belt Boulevard route in Richmond from Boulevard and its intersections with Main and Cary Streets north to U.S. Route 1 in Henrico County was originally numbered as Virginia State Route 432. In 1933, it was renumbered as Virginia State Route 161. The SR-161 route numbering was assigned south of State Route 147 during World War II.

=== Traffic circles ===
Although promoted as a bypass of heavy traffic near downtown Richmond, the Belt Boulevard route included two of the Richmond area's busier traffic circles.

- McGuire Circle was located at the intersection of Hull Street Road (U.S. Route 360) in Chesterfield County, where major shopping centers were developed in the post World War II period, notably Southside Plaza Shopping Center, opened in 1958. McGuire Circle has two lanes in the center and heavy through truck traffic on U.S. Route 360, leading to some spectacular and deadly accidents, with overturned tractor-trailer rigs not uncommon.
- Westwood Circle was located at the five-pointed junction of north stub end of "the Boulevard", and the through streets of Hermitage Road and Westwood Avenue. Although also heavily congested, this circle did not have the through truck traffic of McGuire Circle and was less notorious for serious collisions.

=== 1958: replaced as a bypass, a new suburban connector ===
The Belt Boulevard as a bypass of Richmond was largely replaced by the new Richmond-Petersburg Turnpike, a toll road which opened in 1958. However, a portion of the southern end of SR 161 retains the Belt Boulevard name, and it is in current use there.

A major intersection was at U.S. Route 360, and after a mile of residential housing, another at U.S. Route 60 (Midlothian Turnpike). The area in between these two points along Belt Boulevard was to become valuable commercial property, anchored by the massive Southside Plaza Shopping Center in 1957. Businesses replacing homes included a Shoney's Big Boy restaurant, a Bill's Barbecue restaurant (a local chain), Ford and Dodge automobile dealerships, a Putt-Putt miniature golf course, and two bowling alleys. In a short time, the equivalent of a small town business district materialized, even as the road changed from a through traffic bypass to a suburban connector street.

=== Post-1970 changes, current routing ===
On January 1, 1970, the City of Richmond annexed most of the southern portion, which had been in Chesterfield County. Although it formerly followed Terminal Avenue, in the 1990s, the VA-161 routing was relocated and extended along newly rebuilt sections of Belt Boulevard and Bells Road, which the route now follows across Jefferson Davis Highway (US 1/301) to meet Interstate 95 (at exit 69).

Both traffic circles had been replaced by traffic signals by the mid-1970s. The area near the larger is still known locally as McGuire Circle, even though the circle has been gone for over 30 years. In the 1980s, the railroad tracks and grade crossing south of Westover Hills were removed. Two railroad grade crossings remain on the newer Bells Road portion of SR-161, on a spur line (the former ACL main line into Manchester and Richmond) and the former Seaboard Air Line Railroad (SAL) S-line of CSX near the major Phillip Morris complex in South Richmond.

== Major intersections ==
County	Location	mi	km	Destinations	Notes
City of Richmond		0.00	0.00	I-95 – Richmond, Petersburg	I-95 exit 69; southern terminus
City of Richmond				Commerce Road	former SR 336 south
City of Richmond				Commerce Road	former SR 336 north
City of Richmond		1.38	2.22	US 1 / US 301 (Jefferson Davis Highway)	
City of Richmond		3.01	4.84	Hopkins Road	interchange
City of Richmond		3.69	5.94	SR 10 east (Broad Rock Boulevard)	South end of SR 10 overlap
City of Richmond		4.12	6.63	SR 10 west (Broad Rock Road)	North end of SR 10 overlap
City of Richmond		4.42	7.11	US 360 (Hull Street Road)	
City of Richmond		5.29	8.51	US 60	interchange
City of Richmond				Forest Hill Avenue	former SR 417
City of Richmond		6.82	10.98	Boulevard Bridge over the James River (toll bridge)	
City of Richmond				I-195 north / SR 195 east to I-64 / I-95	interchange
City of Richmond		8.54	13.74	SR 147 east (West Cary Street)	
City of Richmond				SR 147 west (West Main Street)	
City of Richmond				SR 315 west	Virginia Museum of Fine Arts
City of Richmond		8.91	14.34	SR 6 west (Kensington Avenue)	Eastern terminus of SR 6
City of Richmond				Monument Avenue	former SR 418 west; no left turns in any direction
City of Richmond		9.33	15.02	US 33 / US 250 (West Broad Street)	
City of Richmond		10.43	16.79	I-64 / I-95	I-95 exit 78
City of Richmond		11.07	17.82	SR 197 (Laburnum Avenue)	
City of Richmond		11.82	19.02	I-95 south to I-64	I-95 exit 80
Henrico	Lakeside	13.10	21.08	SR 356 west (Hilliard Road)	
Henrico	Lakeside	13.84	22.27	US 1 (Brook Road)	Northern terminus
1.000 mi = 1.609 km; 1.000 km = 0.621 mi: Concurrency terminus; Incomplete access; Tolled

< SR 431	District 4 State Routes; 1928–1933	SR 433 >
