= Virginia State Route 6 =

State highway in Virginia, US

State Route 6

Route information
- Maintained by VDOT
- Length: 102.26 mi (164.57 km)
- Existed: July 1, 1933–present
- Tourist routes: Virginia Byway

Major junctions
- West end: US 250 in Afton
- US 29 in Woods Mill; US 15 in Fork Union; US 522 in Goochland; SR 288 near Manakin
- East end: SR 161 in Richmond

Location
- Country: United States
- State: Virginia
- Counties: Nelson, Albemarle, Fluvanna, Goochland, Henrico, City of Richmond

Highway system
- Virginia Routes; Interstate; US; Primary; Secondary; Byways; History; HOT lanes
← SR 5	→ SR 7

State Route 6 (SR 6) is a primary state highway in the U.S. state of Virginia. Known for most of its length as River Road, the state highway runs 102.26 miles (164.57 km) from U.S. Route 250 (US 250) in Afton east to SR 161 in Richmond. SR 6 is one of the main highways of mountainous Nelson County, where the highway runs north–south from its beginning to US 29. From Scottsville to Richmond, the state highway parallels the James River. SR 6 is a major suburban highway through southwestern Henrico County and the main street of Richmond's West End.

SR 6 is a Virginia Byway from SR 151 at Avon to SR 650 near Manakin.

== Route description ==
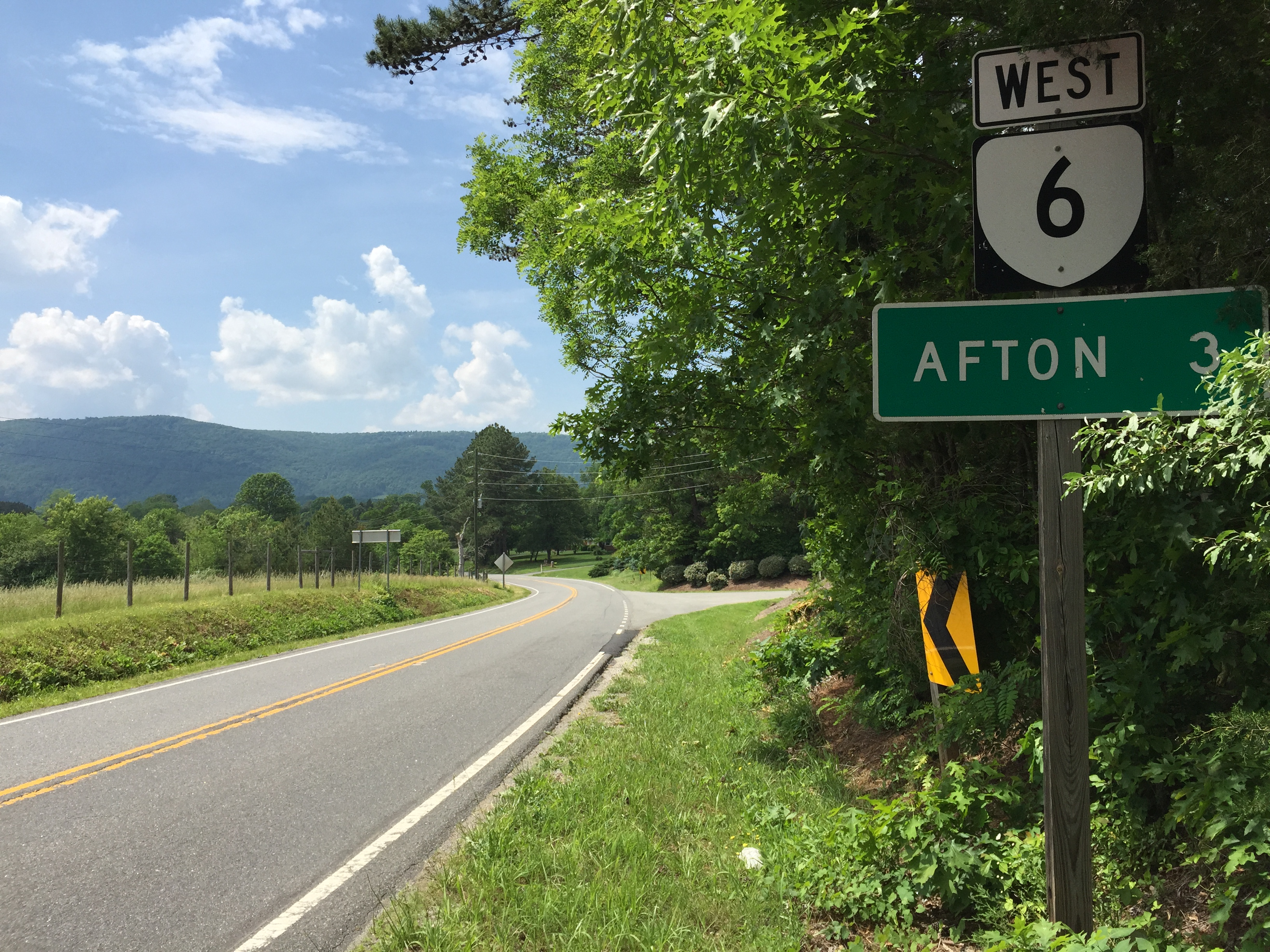
View west along SR 6 past SR 151 near Avon

SR 6 begins at US 250 (Rockfish Gap Turnpike) on the slope of Afton Mountain, the local name for this section of the Blue Ridge Mountains, about 1 mile (1.6 km) east of Rockfish Gap. The state highway heads south as Afton Mountain Road, which descends the mountain curvaceously and passes through the village of Afton, where the highway crosses over a CSX rail line. At the bottom of the descent, SR 6 meets SR 151 (Critzers Shop Road) in the village of Avon. The two highways head south as Rockfish Valley Highway through the namesake valley. Just south of Greenfield, SR 6 leaves SR 151 and heads east as River Road, which follows the Rockfish River through a mountainous area south to US 29 (Thomas Nelson Highway). SR 6 heads east along the four-lane divided highway between several mountains before splitting to the southeast as Irish Road. The state highway crosses over Norfolk Southern Railway's Washington District in Faber and enters Albemarle County at a gap between Shiloh Mountain and Butler Mountain.

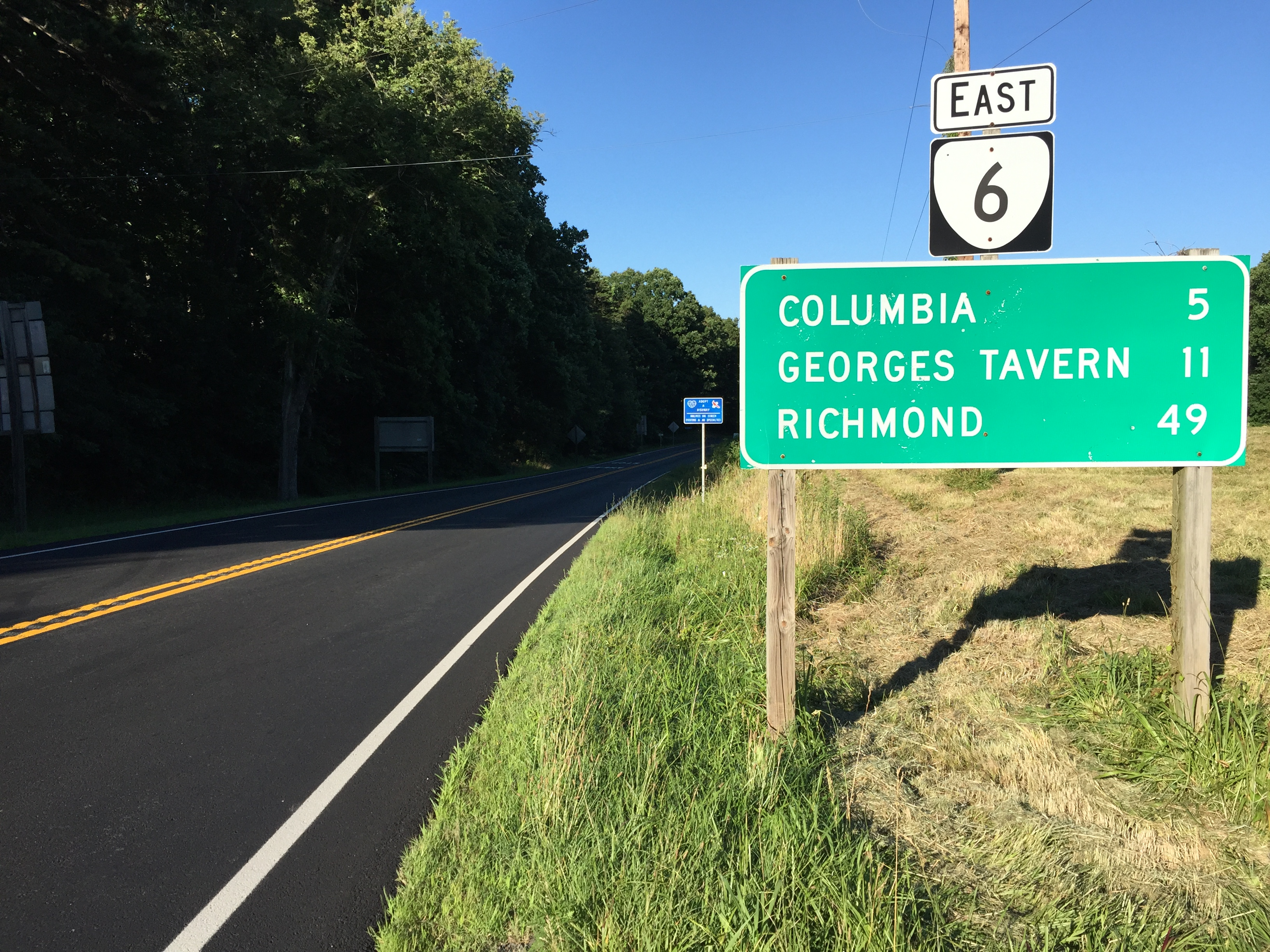
View east along SR 6 at US 15 in Fluvanna County

SR 6 continues east along a mountainous area where the highway passes through the communities of Damon, Tillmans, Esmont, and Porters. The state highway enters an area of more gentle terrain on its way to Scottsville, which is on the border between Albemarle and Fluvanna counties. At the north end of the town, SR 6 joins SR 20 in a concurrency on Valley Street. In the center of town, SR 6 heads east as Main Street while SR 20 crosses the James River. The state highway parallels the river and CSX's Rivanna Subdivision through the town before turning north and ascending out of the river valley. SR 6 continues east as River Road through Kidds Store and Cohasset to Fork Union, home of Fork Union Military Academy. The state highway runs concurrently with US 15 (James Madison Highway) northeast from Fork Union before diverging at Dixie.

SR 6 passes through Holmhead and crosses the Rivanna River shortly before passing through the town of Columbia, where the highway is named St. James Street. At the east end of the town, SR 6 enters Goochland County and briefly parallels the Rivanna Subdivision through the valley of the James River. The state highway veers away from the river and meets the northern end of SR 45 (Cartersville Road) at Georges Tavern. SR 6 approaches the river again just before arriving in Goochland. At the north end of the county seat, the state highway joins US 522 (Sandy Hook Road) in a concurrency and heads south past the Western Campus of J. Sargeant Reynolds Community College. SR 6 and US 522 pass the county offices and the Virginia Correctional Center for Women before US 522 heads south across the James River as Maidens Road. SR 6 heads through the villages of Manakin and Sabot, between which SR 6 expands to a four-lane divided highway. At Richmond Country Club, River Road splits to the south and the state highway continues east as Patterson Avenue.

SR 6 meets the SR 288 freeway at a cloverleaf interchange before crossing Tuckahoe Creek into suburban Henrico County. The state highway intersects Gaskins Road, which heads north as SR 157, and Parham Road in the suburb of Tuckahoe. At Glenside Drive, which leads north to Monument Avenue, SR 6 veers southeast and enters the city of Richmond. The state highway becomes an undivided highway just before intersecting SR 197 (Malvern Avenue). SR 6 crosses over Interstate 195 (Beltline Expressway), which is accessed via Thompson Street, which the state highway intersects as it shifts to two-lane Kensington Avenue. The state highway continues through the Museum District until it reaches its eastern terminus at SR 161 (Boulevard) one block north of the Virginia Museum of Fine Arts.

== Major intersections ==
County	Location	mi	km	Destinations	Notes
Nelson		0.00	0.00	US 250 (Rockfish Gap Turnpike) to I-64 – Skyline Drive, Waynesboro, Charlottesville	Western terminus
Nelson	Avon	3.72	5.99	SR 151 north (Critzers Shop Road) / SR 638 east (Avon Road) to I-64 – Skyline Drive, Waynesboro, Blue Ridge Parkway	West end of SR 151 overlap
Nelson		9.94	16.00	SR 151 south (Rockfish Valley Highway) – Wintergreen, Piney River	East end of SR 151 overlap
Nelson	Woods Mill	15.73	25.31	US 29 south (Thomas Nelson Highway) – Lynchburg	West end of US 29 overlap
Nelson		19.67	31.66	US 29 north (Thomas Nelson Highway) – Charlottesville	East end of US 29 overlap
Albemarle				SR 800 (Schuyler Road) – Walton's Mountain Museum, Schuyler	former SR 335 south
Albemarle	Scottsville	35.97	57.89	SR 20 north (Valley Street) – Charlottesville	West end of SR 20 overlap
Albemarle	Scottsville	36.55	58.82	SR 20 south (Valley Street)	East end of SR 20 overlap
Fluvanna	Fork Union	52.41	84.35	US 15 south (James Madison Highway) – Farmville, Clarksville	West end of US 15 overlap
Fluvanna	Dixie	54.40	87.55	US 15 north (James Madison Highway) – Gordonsville, Orange, Culpeper	East end of US 15 overlap
Fluvanna				SR 656 (Bremo Road)	former SR 247 south
Fluvanna	Columbia			SR 659 (Stage Junction Road)	former SR 27 north
Fluvanna	Columbia			SR 667 (Old Columbia Road) / SR 690 (Columbia Road)	former SR 27 south
Goochland	Georges Tavern	65.61	105.59	SR 45 south (Cartersville Road) – Cartersville, Farmville	
Goochland		75.49	121.49	US 522 north (Sandy Hook Road) to I-64 – Gum Spring	West end of US 522 overlap
Goochland				SR 396 (Dickinson Road) – J. Sargeant Reynolds Community College	
Goochland				Virginia Correctional Center for Women (SR 329)	
Goochland	Maidens	77.23	124.29	US 522 south / SR 634 (Maidens Road) – Powhatan	East end of US 522 overlap
Goochland				SR 310 – James River Correctional Center	
Goochland				SR 310 / SR 645 (Beaverdam Creek Road) – James River Correctional Center	
Goochland	Crozier			SR 670 (Cardwell Road) – Oilville	former SR 159 north
Goochland	Manakin			SR 650 (River Road)	
Goochland		90.64	145.87	SR 288 to I-64 / US 60 / US 250 – Midlothian, Chesterfield	Interchange; southbound SR 288 to westbound SR 6 access via West Creek Parkway
Henrico	Tuckahoe	94.73	152.45	SR 157 north (Gaskins Road)	
City of Richmond				Three Chopt Road	former SR 197 south
City of Richmond		101.17	162.82	SR 197 (Malvern Avenue)	
City of Richmond		102.26	164.57	SR 161 (North Boulevard) to I-95	Eastern terminus
1.000 mi = 1.609 km; 1.000 km = 0.621 mi: Concurrency terminus

< SR 18	Two‑digit State Routes; 1923-1933	SR 20 >
