= Short Pump =

Short Pump may refer to:

- Short Pump Middle School, a Middle School in Virginia
- Short Pump Elementary School, an Elementary School in Virginia
- Short Pump Town Center, an outdoor mall In Virginia
- Short Pump, Virginia, a town in Virginia
