= Arthur Ashe Boulevard =

- Boulevard Historic District
- U.S. National Register of Historic Places
- U.S. Historic district
- Virginia Landmarks Register
- Richmond City Historic District
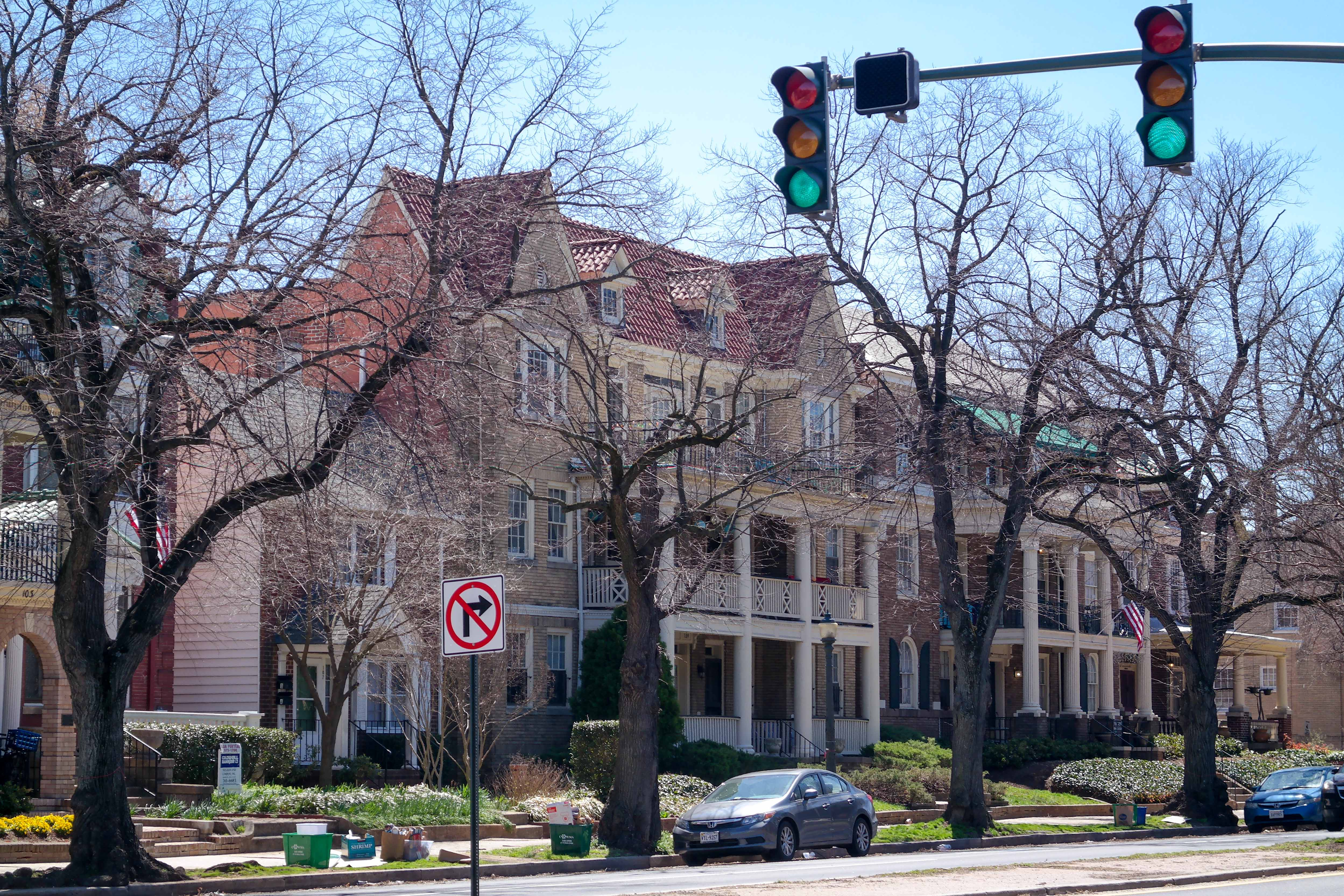

- Location within Virginia Location within the United States
- Location: 10--300 S. Arthur Ashe Boulevard and 10--800 N. Arthur Ashe Boulevard, Richmond, Virginia
- Coordinates: 37°33′23″N 77°28′29″W
- Area: 61 acres (25 ha)
- Architect: Davis Bros.; Et al.
- Architectural style: Late 19th And Early 20th Century American Movements, Late 19th And 20th Century Revivals, Late Victorian
- NRHP reference No.: 86002887
- VLR No.: 127-0398

Significant dates
- Added to NRHP: September 18, 1986
- Designated VLR: February 18, 1986

Arthur Ashe Boulevard (also referred to as "the Boulevard") is a historic street in the near the West End of Richmond, Virginia, providing access to Byrd Park. It serves as the border between Carytown and the Museum District to the west and the Fan district to the east. Attempts were made to rename the street after Arthur Ashe, a tennis star and social activist who was born and grew up in Richmond, but previous attempts failed until February 2019 when Richmond City Council voted in favor of changing the name to Arthur Ashe Boulevard. Near the south end is Richmond's Boulevard Bridge (commonly called the "Nickel Bridge", in reference to its historical initial toll) across the James River. Arthur Ashe Boulevard intersects with main arteries Cary Street, Main Street, Monument Avenue, Broad Street (where the Historic District ends), Leigh Street, and Interstate 64/95, and terminates at Hermitage Road. The Diamond is located on Arthur Ashe Boulevard. The intersection of Arthur Ashe Boulevard and Monument Avenue featured a statue of Stonewall Jackson.

Arthur Ashe Boulevard is designated as State Route 161, a route promoted in the 1940s and 1950s as an alternate bypass route before the Richmond-Petersburg Turnpike and Interstate 95 were built, connecting with U.S. Route 1 north and south of downtown Richmond.

In 2019, American artist Kehinde Wiley's outdoor sculpture Rumors of War was erected adjacent to Arthur Ashe Boulevard. It is part of the Virginia Museum of Fine Arts permanent art collection. It stands between the museum and the United Daughters of the Confederacy headquarters. The sculpture was created by Wiley as a response to the J.E.B. Stuart monument and the other Confederate equestrian statues on Monument Avenue, all of which have since been removed by the city.
