= VA6 =

VA-6 has the following meanings:

- Attack Squadron 6 (U.S. Navy)
- Virginia State Route 6
- Virginia's 6th congressional district
