= Virginia State Route 356 =

State highway in Henrico County, Virginia, US

State Route 356
- Hilliard Road

Route information
- Maintained by VDOT
- Length: 1.43 mi (2.30 km)
- Existed: 1940s–present

Major junctions
- West end: US 33 in Dumbarton
- East end: SR 161 in Lakeside

Location
- Country: United States
- State: Virginia
- Counties: Henrico

Highway system
- Virginia Routes; Interstate; US; Primary; Secondary; Byways; History; HOT lanes
← SR 355	→ SR 357

State Route 356 (SR 356) is a primary state highway in the U.S. state of Virginia. Known as Hilliard Road, the state highway runs 1.43 miles (2.30 km) from U.S. Route 33 (US 33) in Dumbarton east to SR 161 in Lakeside in central Henrico County.

== Route description ==
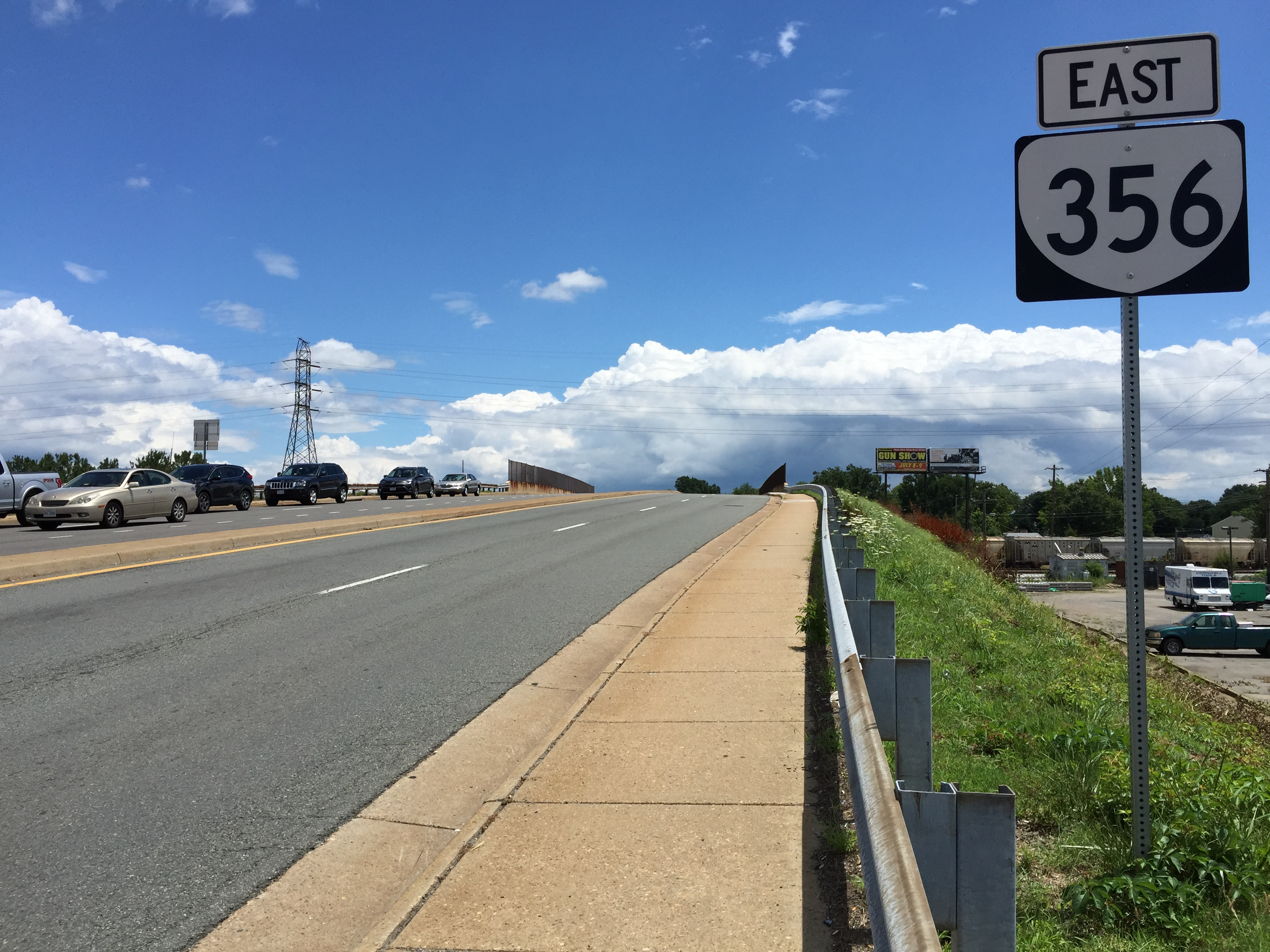
View east along SR 356 at US 33 in Dumbarton

SR 356 begins at a four-way intersection with US 33 (Staples Mill Road) just south of Amtrak's Richmond Staples Mill Road station in the community of Dumbarton. The west leg of the intersection is Glenside Drive. The state highway heads east as a five-lane highway with a center left-turn lane and crosses over CSX's RF&P Subdivision, which hosts the Amtrak service. SR 356 heads east through a residential area on the north side of the community of Lakeside. The state highway reaches its eastern terminus at Lakeside Avenue. SR 161 heads south on Lakeside Avenue toward Richmond and east as a continuation of Hilliard Avenue to its northern terminus at US 1. Lakeside Avenue heads north as an unnumbered highway to the Lewis Ginter Botanical Garden.

== Major intersections ==
The entire route is in Henrico County.

Location	mi	km	Destinations	Notes
Greendale	0.00	0.00	US 33 (Staples Mill Road) / Glenside Drive	Western terminus
Lakeside	1.43	2.30	SR 161 (Lakeside Avenue / Hilliard Road)	Eastern terminus
1.000 mi = 1.609 km; 1.000 km = 0.621 mi
