= Two Hundred Block West Franklin Street Historic District =

Historic district in Virginia, United States

- U.S. National Register of Historic Places
- U.S. Historic district
- Virginia Landmarks Register
- Richmond City Historic District
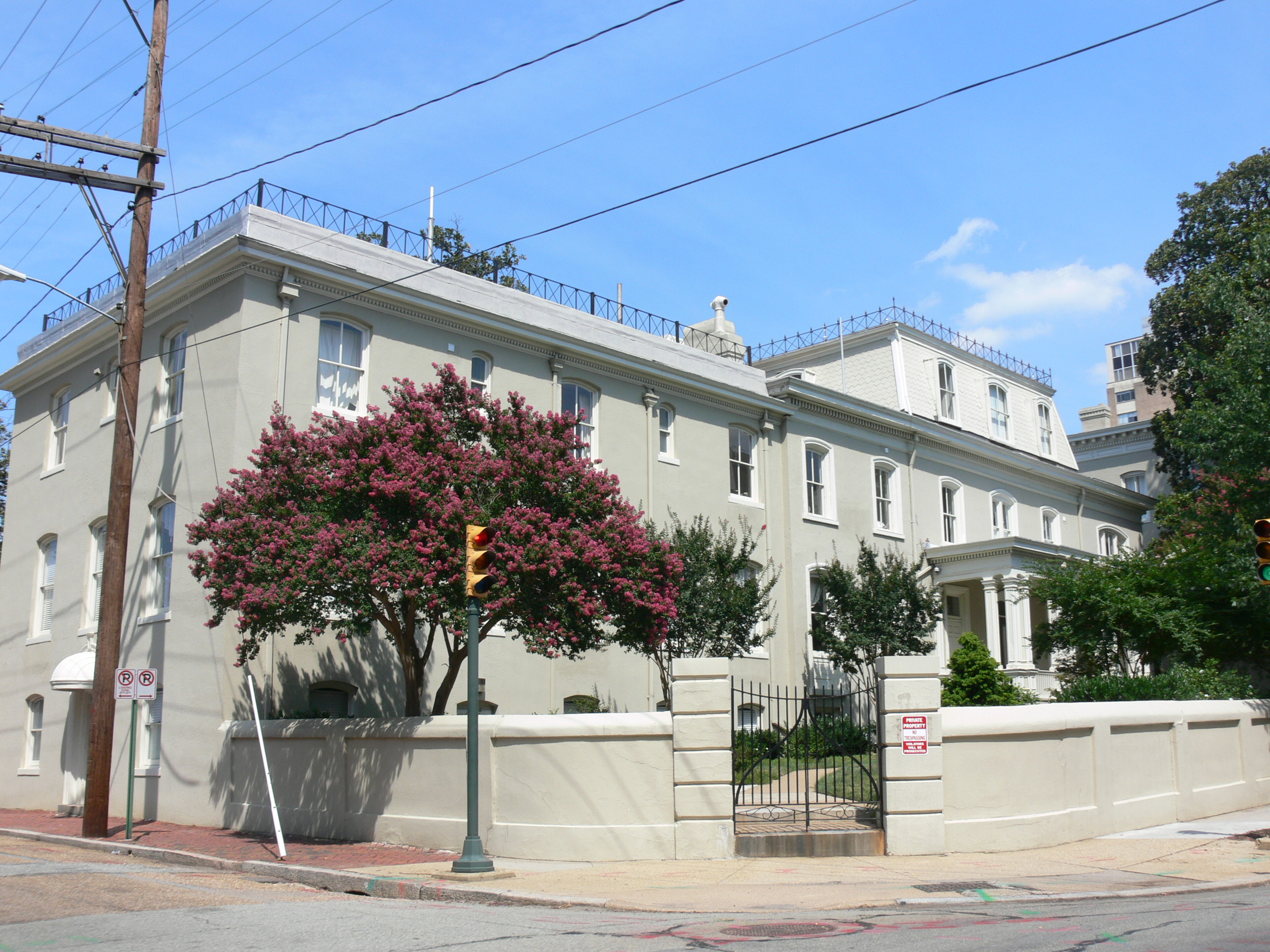
- Price House, 208-212 West Franklin Street, July 2011

- Location within Virginia Location within the United States
- Location: 200 block of W. Franklin St., Richmond, Virginia
- Coordinates: 37°32′42″N 77°26′47″W
- Area: 3 acres (1.2 ha)
- Architect: Carriere & Hastings
- Architectural style: Greek Revival, Beaux Arts, Federal, Queen Anne
- NRHP reference No.: 77001536, 94001238 (Boundary Increase)
- VLR No.: 127-0281

Significant dates
- Added to NRHP: November 17, 1977, October 21, 1994 (Boundary Increase)
- Designated VLR: May 17, 1977, August 17, 1994

The Two Hundred Block West Franklin Street Historic District is a national historic district located at Richmond, Virginia. It is located between downtown and the Fan district. The district encompasses 13 contributing buildings built during the 19th century and in a variety of popular architectural styles including Greek Revival, Federal, Beaux-Arts, and Queen Anne. Many of the dwellings have been converted to commercial use. Notable buildings include Queen Anne Row (1891), the Carter-Mayo House designed by Carrère and Hastings, the Cole Diggs House, the Smith-Palmer House, the Ida Schoolcraft House, the Price House, the A. S. Smith House, and the T. Seddon Bruce House.

It was added to the National Register of Historic Places in 1977, with a boundary increase in 1994.
