= Glen Allen, Virginia =

- Census-designated place
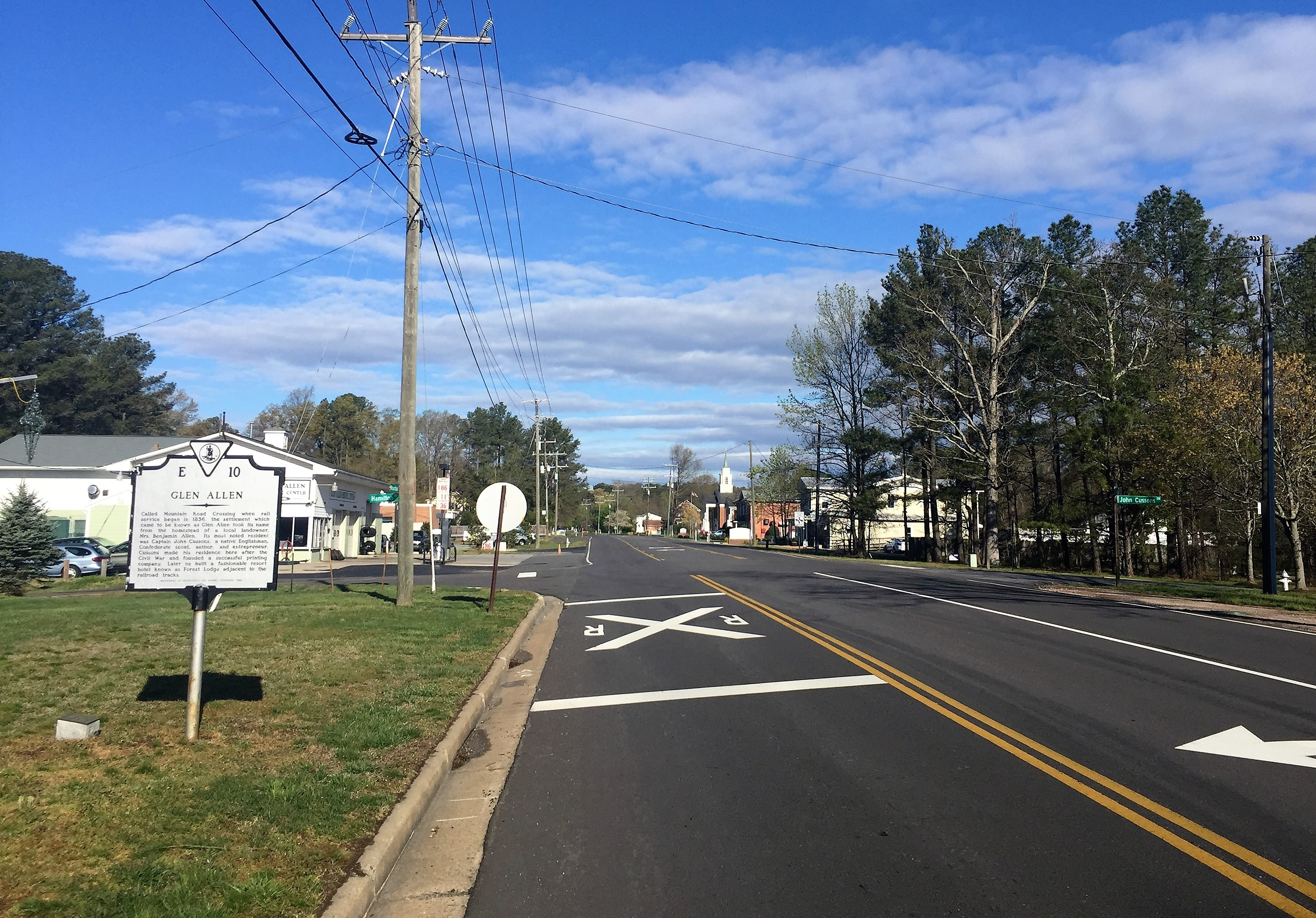
- Mountain Road in Glen Allen, Virginia, with historical marker in the foreground

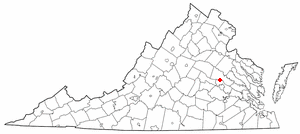
- Location of Glen Allen, Virginia
- Coordinates: 37°39′36″N 77°29′8″W
- Country: United States
- State: Virginia
- County: Henrico

Area
  - Total: 8.8 sq mi (22.9 km^{2})
  - Land: 8.8 sq mi (22.9 km^{2})
  - Water: 0 sq mi (0.0 km^{2})
- Elevation: 207 ft (63 m)

Population (2020)
  - Total: 16,187
  - Density: 1,830/sq mi (707/km^{2})
- Time zone: UTC−5 (Eastern (EST))
  - Summer (DST): UTC−4 (EDT)
- ZIP codes: 23058-23060
- Area code: 804
- FIPS code: 51-31200
- GNIS feature ID: 1494958

Glen Allen is a census-designated place (CDP) in Henrico County, Virginia, United States. The population was 16,187 as of the 2020 Census, up from 14,774 at the 2010 census.

== History ==
Called "Mountain Road Crossing" when rail service began in 1836, the settlement which came to be known as Glen Allen took its name from the homestead of a local landowner, Mrs. Benjamin Allen. Its most noted resident was Captain John Cussons, a native Englishman, Confederate scout, author, and entrepreneur. Cussons made his residence here after the Civil War and founded a successful printing company. Later, he built a fashionable resort hotel adjacent to the railroad tracks, which was known as Forest Lodge.

Glen Allen used to be mostly rural farmland, but it is now a growing suburb of Richmond.

== Geography ==
According to the United States Census Bureau, the CDP has a total area of 8.86 square miles (22.94 km^{2}), of which 8.79 square miles (22.77 km^{2}) are land and 0.069 square miles (0.18 km^{2}), or 0.76%, are water.

The Glen Allen census-designated place is in northern Henrico County, approximately 11 miles (18 km) north-northwest of downtown Richmond. The CDP is bordered to the north by the Chickahominy River, which forms the Henrico–Hanover County line. The eastern border of the CDP is Interstate 95, from the Chickahominy River south to East Parham Road. The southern border of the CDP follows East Parham Road, U.S. Route 1, Virginia State Route 157 (Mountain Road), Jessie Chavis Drive, North Run, Woodman Road, Blackburn Road, Winston Boulevard, and Indale Road to the CSX railroad line, which it follows south to Hungary Road. The western border of the CDP follows Hungary Spring Road, Old Route 33, Attems Way, and U.S. Route 33 (Staples Mill Road) to Courtney Road, then follows a power line northeast back to the CSX rail line. The border follows the railroad north to County Road 625 (Greenwood Road), then takes Old Washington Highway to the Chickahominy River. Glen Allen uses two postal addresses, ZIP codes 23059 and 23060, which cover neighboring communities as well, including rural areas of Hanover County to the north.

The Glen Allen CDP includes all or portions of the communities of Hunton, Greenwood, Longdale, Holly Glen Estates, Biltmore, and Yellow Tavern.

== Demographics ==
Historical population
Census	Pop.	Note	%±
1980	6,202		—
1990	9,010		45.3%
2000	12,562		39.4%
2010	14,774		17.6%
2020	16,187		9.6%
U.S. Decennial Census; 1950 1960 1970; 1980 1990 2000; 2010

Glen Allen was first listed as a census designated place in the 1980 U.S. census.

=== Racial and ethnic composition ===
Glen Allen CDP, Virginia – Racial and ethnic composition Note: the US Census treats Hispanic/Latino as an ethnic category. This table excludes Latinos from the racial categories and assigns them to a separate category. Hispanics/Latinos may be of any race.
Race / Ethnicity (NH = Non-Hispanic)	Pop 2000	Pop 2010	Pop 2020	% 2000	% 2010	% 2020
White alone (NH)	9,314	9,185	8,975	74.14%	62.17%	55.45%
Black or African American alone (NH)	2,437	3,714	4,066	19.40%	25.14%	25.12%
Native American or Alaska Native alone (NH)	43	31	43	0.34%	0.21%	0.27%
Asian alone (NH)	382	923	1,255	3.04%	6.25%	7.75%
Native Hawaiian or Pacific Islander alone (NH)	8	9	20	0.06%	0.06%	0.12%
Other race alone (NH)	21	39	82	0.17%	0.26%	0.51%
Mixed race or Multiracial (NH)	140	299	814	1.11%	2.02%	5.03%
Hispanic or Latino (any race)	217	574	932	1.73%	3.89%	5.76%
Total	12,562	14,774	16,187	100.00%	100.00%	100.00%

=== 2020 census ===
As of the 2020 census, Glen Allen had a population of 16,187, up from 14,774 at the 2010 census. The median age was 39.9 years. 22.6% of residents were under the age of 18 and 16.0% of residents were 65 years of age or older. For every 100 females there were 89.0 males, and for every 100 females age 18 and over there were 85.2 males age 18 and over.

100.0% of residents lived in urban areas, while 0.0% lived in rural areas.

There were 6,433 households in Glen Allen, of which 32.1% had children under the age of 18 living in them. Of all households, 49.3% were married-couple households, 14.4% were households with a male householder and no spouse or partner present, and 30.5% were households with a female householder and no spouse or partner present. About 25.6% of all households were made up of individuals and 10.9% had someone living alone who was 65 years of age or older.

There were 6,654 housing units, of which 3.3% were vacant. The homeowner vacancy rate was 0.9% and the rental vacancy rate was 4.4%.

Racial composition as of the 2020 census
Race	Number	Percent
White	9,140	56.5%
Black or African American	4,130	25.5%
American Indian and Alaska Native	54	0.3%
Asian	1,272	7.9%
Native Hawaiian and Other Pacific Islander	20	0.1%
Some other race	355	2.2%
Two or more races	1,216	7.5%

=== Income and poverty ===
The median income for a household in the CDP was $79,401. The per capita income for the CDP was $39,414. About 7% of the population were below the poverty line.

== Economy ==
The Henrico Sports & Events Center is located in Glen Allen, along with other businesses in the Virginia Center Commons area.

== Notable people ==
- Gene Alley, former Major League Baseball shortstop
- Dave Brat, former member of the U.S. House of Representatives for Virginia's 7th congressional district
- Chris Durkin, soccer
- Zac Jones, NHL hockey player for the New York Rangers
- Andrew Knizner, baseball player for the Seattle Mariners
- R. C. Orlan, baseball pitcher
- Brian Ownby, soccer player
- Abigail Spanberger, Governor of Virginia, and former member of the U.S. House of Representatives for Virginia's 7th congressional district
- Tyler Warren, professional American football tight end for the Indianapolis Colts
