= Virginia State Route 157 =

State highway in Henrico County, Virginia, US

State Route 157

Route information
- Maintained by VDOT
- Length: 7.71 mi (12.41 km)
- Existed: 1933–present

Major junctions
- South end: SR 6 in Tuckahoe
- US 250 in Henrico
- North end: US 33 in Glen Allen

Location
- Country: United States
- State: Virginia
- Counties: Henrico

Highway system
- Virginia Routes; Interstate; US; Primary; Secondary; Byways; History; HOT lanes
← SR 156	→ SR 158

State Route 157 (SR 157) is a primary state highway in the U.S. state of Virginia. The state highway runs 7.71 miles (12.41 km) from SR 6 in Tuckahoe north to U.S. Route 33 (US 33) in Glen Allen. SR 157 passes through western Henrico County, a suburban area north and west of Richmond.

== Route description ==
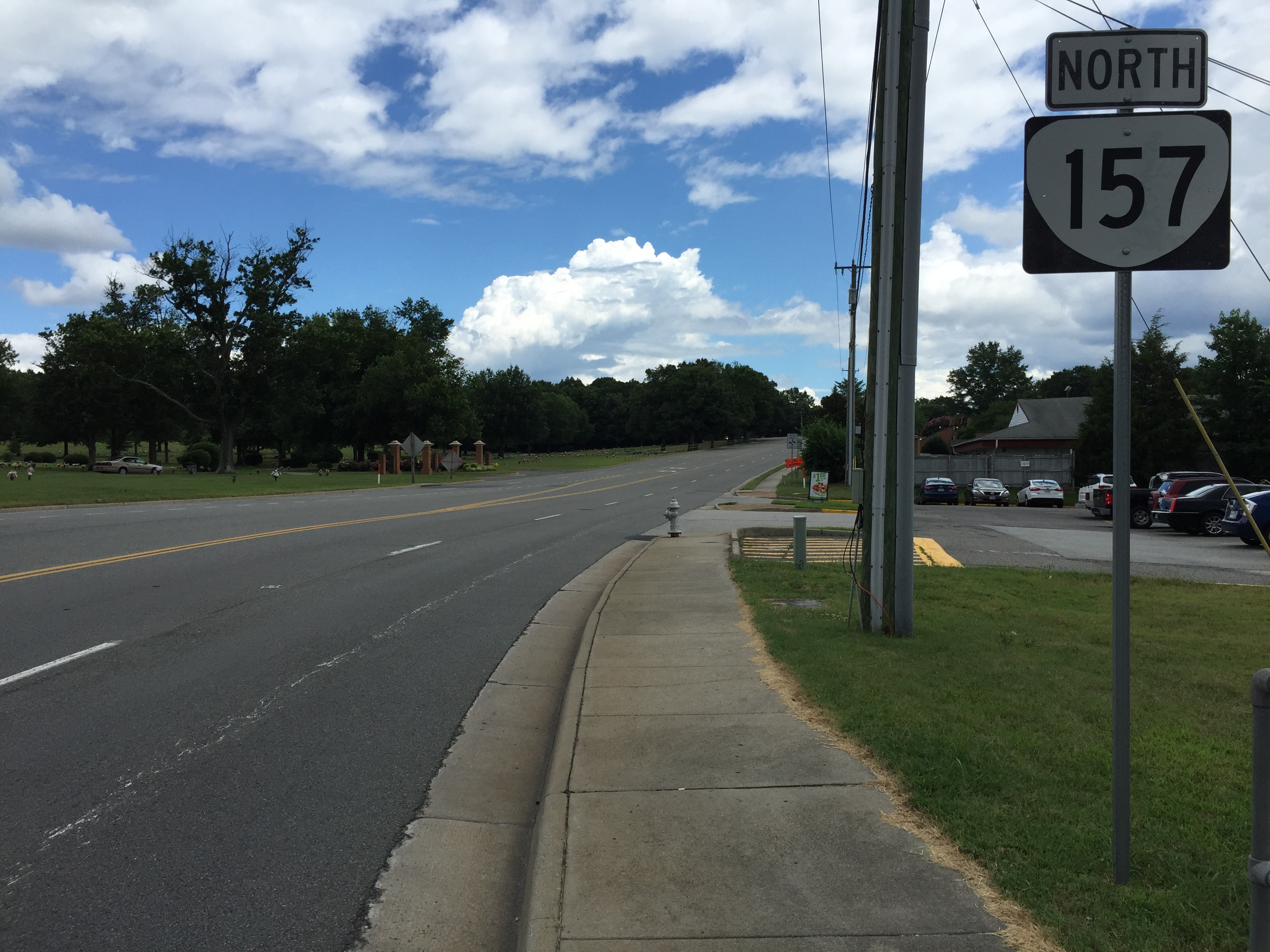
View north along SR 157 from SR 6 in Tuckahoe

SR 157 begins at an intersection with SR 6 (Patterson Avenue) and the southern unnumbered portion of Gaskins Road, a four-lane divided highway, in Tuckahoe. The state highway heads north along Gaskins Road, a five-lane road with a center left-turn lane. When SR 157 reaches its four-way intersection with the northern unnumbered section of Gaskins Road and Quioccasin Road, the state highway turns east onto Quioccasin Road, a three-lane road with center turn lane. East of Quioccasin Middle School, SR 157 turns north onto Pemberton Road; Quioccasin Road continues east as a five-lane road with center turn lane. The state highway follows two-lane Pemberton Road north into the Henrico area of the county. SR 157 crosses Interstate 64 with no access prior to its intersection with US 250 (Broad Street); the Interstate Highway is accessed via Gaskins Road to the west. The state highway heads north from the U.S. Highway as Springfield Road, a four-lane divided highway. SR 157 intersects the northern end of Gaskins Road and Hungary Road. North of Nuckols Road, the state highway reduces to two lanes and gradually curves east into the Glen Allen area. SR 157 passes through several curves and has a right-angle turn from the north to the east at Francistown Road before reaching its northern terminus at US 33 (Staples Mill Road) in Glen Allen.

== Major intersections ==
The entire route is in Henrico County.

Location	mi	km	Destinations	Notes
Tuckahoe	0.00	0.00	SR 6 (Patterson Avenue) / Gaskins Road	Southern terminus
Tuckahoe	0.82	1.32	Gaskins Road to I-64	
	4.09	6.58	US 250 (Broad Street)	
Glen Allen	5.65	9.09	Nuckols Road to I-295	
Glen Allen	7.71	12.41	US 33 (Staples Mill Road) / Mountain Road to I-295	Northern terminus
1.000 mi = 1.609 km; 1.000 km = 0.621 mi
