= Virginia Correctional Center for Women =

Prison in Virginia, United States

Coordinates: 37°40′30.4″N 77°53′27″W

- Interactive map of Virginia Correctional Center for Women
- Location: 2841 River Rd W Goochland, Virginia
- Status: open
- Security class: mixed (women's facility)
- Capacity: 572
- Opened: 1931
- Managed by: Virginia Department of Corrections

The Virginia Correctional Center for Women is a female-only state prison in Virginia, USA. It is a part of the Virginia Department of Corrections.

Opened in 1931, it is located in unincorporated Goochland County, on US 522 / SR 6 between Maidens and Goochland, in central Virginia. The Virginia Department of Transportation maintains the entrance road as State Route 329.
