= Fan District =

Historic district in Richmond, Virginia, United States

- Fan Area Historic District
- U.S. National Register of Historic Places
- U.S. Historic district
- Virginia Landmarks Register
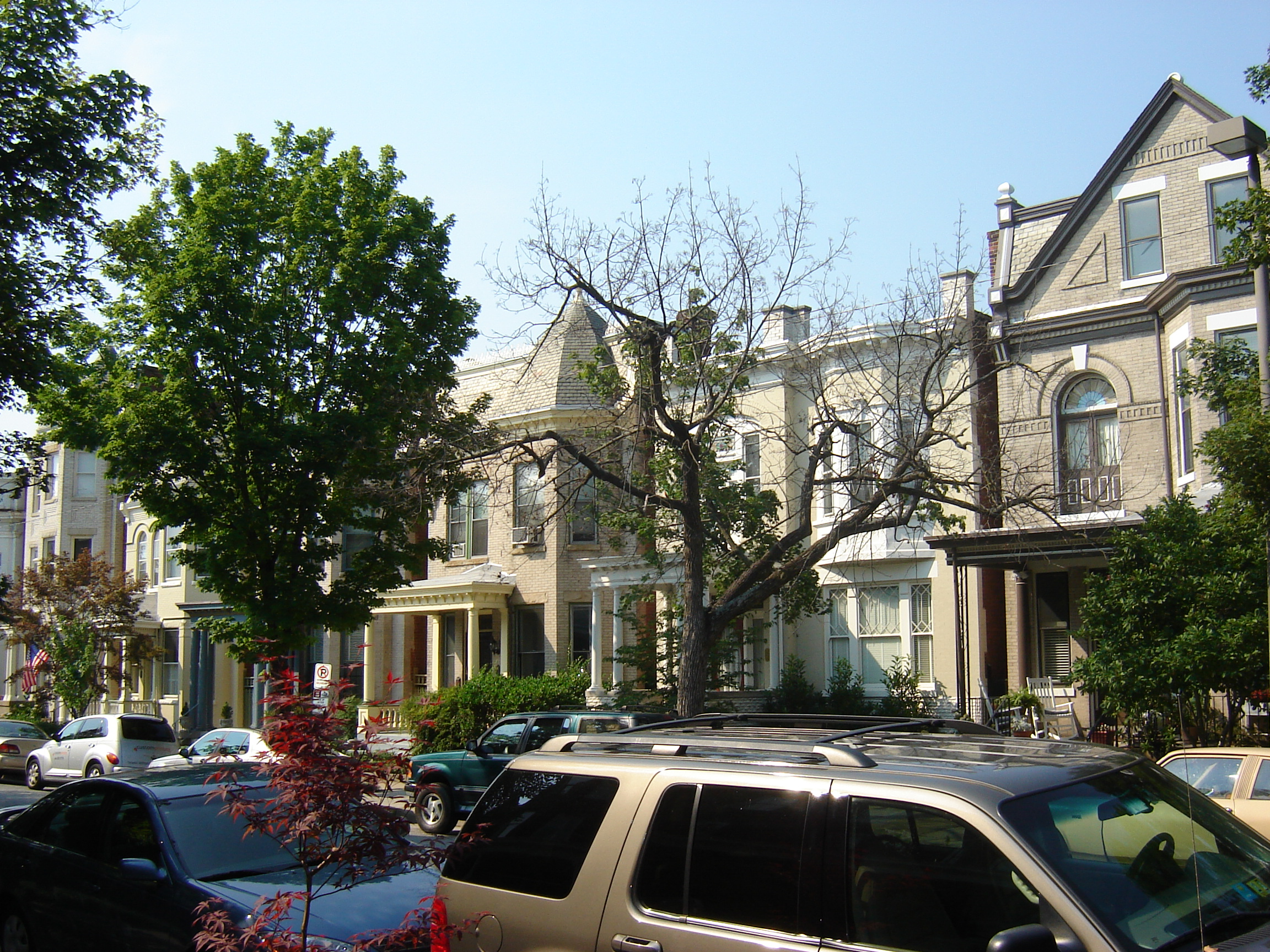
- A street in the Fan

- Location within Virginia Location within the United States
- Location: Roughly bounded by N. Harrison, W. Main, W. Grace and N. Mullberry Sts., Richmond, Virginia
- Coordinates: 37°33′9″N 77°27′56″W
- Area: 228 acres (92 ha)
- Architect: Multiple
- Architectural style: Mid 19th Century Revival, Late 19th-20th Century Revivals, Late Victorian
- NRHP reference No.: 85002243
- VLR No.: 127-0248

Significant dates
- Added to NRHP: September 12, 1985
- Designated VLR: August 13, 1985

The Fan is a historic district of Richmond, Virginia in the United States, so named because of the "fan" shape of the array of streets that extend west from Belvidere Street, on the eastern edge of Monroe Park, westward to Arthur Ashe Boulevard. However, the streets rapidly resemble a grid after they go through what is now Virginia Commonwealth University. The Fan is one of the easterly points of the city's West End section, and is bordered to the north by Broad Street and to the south by VA 195, although the Fan District Association considers the southern border to be the properties abutting the south side of Main Street. The western side is sometimes called the Upper Fan and the eastern side the Lower Fan, though confusingly, the Uptown district is located near VCU in the Lower Fan. Many cafes and locally owned restaurants are located here, as well as historic Monument Avenue, a boulevard formerly featuring statuary of the Civil War's Confederate president and generals. The only current statue is a more modern one of tennis icon Arthur Ashe. Development of the Fan district was strongly influenced by the City Beautiful movement of the late 19th century.

The Fan District is primarily a residential neighborhood consisting of late-nineteenth and early-twentieth century homes. It is also home to VCU's Monroe Park Campus, several parks, and tree-lined avenues. The District also has numerous houses of worship, locally owned businesses, and commercial establishments. The Fan borders and blends with the Boulevard, the Museum District, and Carytown, which features the ornate Byrd Theatre.

Main east-west thoroughfares include Broad Street, Grace Street, Monument Avenue, Patterson Avenue, Grove Avenue, Floyd Avenue, Main Street, Parkwood Avenue, and Cary Street.

== Architecture ==
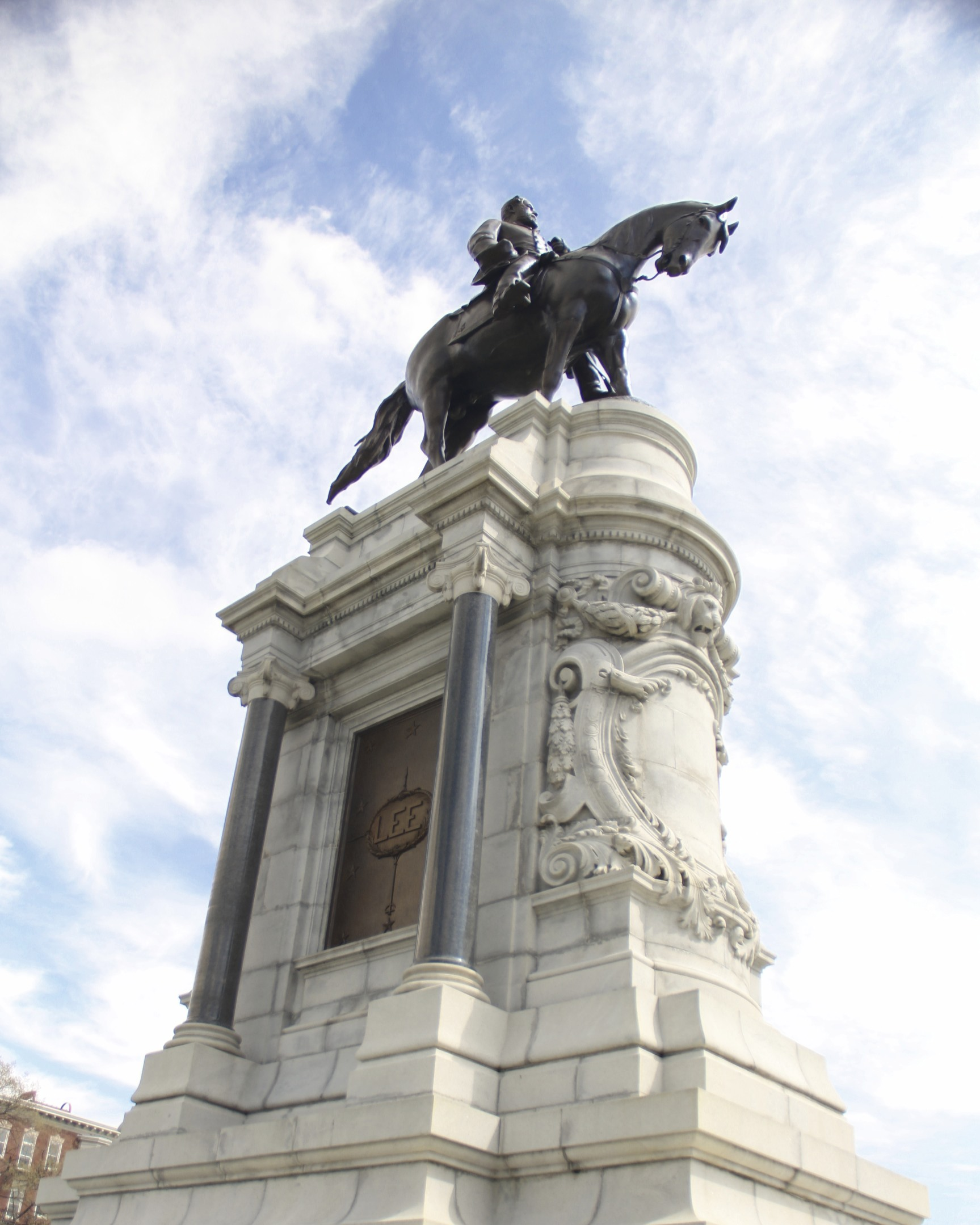
Robert E. Lee statue on Monument Avenue prior to September 08, 2021, when it was removed.

Following a succession of owners, an architecture museum called the Virginia Center for Architecture took occupancy of Branch House on Monument Avenue in 2005. The residence was designed in the Tudor style by the firm of John Russell Pope in 1916.

The Fan is known for having one of the longest intact stretches of Victorian architecture in the United States; however, much of the housing stock was actually built after the end of the Victorian era and is arguably more Edwardian and Revival in style. While housing in the Eastern parts of the neighborhood are quintessential Victorian styles, such as Italianate and Queen Anne, housing stock further west was constructed in the first decades of the twentieth century and exhibits the pared back victorianism of Edwardian architecture. Homes still contain gables and turrets, but detail is normally executed in a simplified classical form. Colonial Revival and American Craftsman architecture are common as well, with Revival architectural types arguably the most common (as was common to the time period).

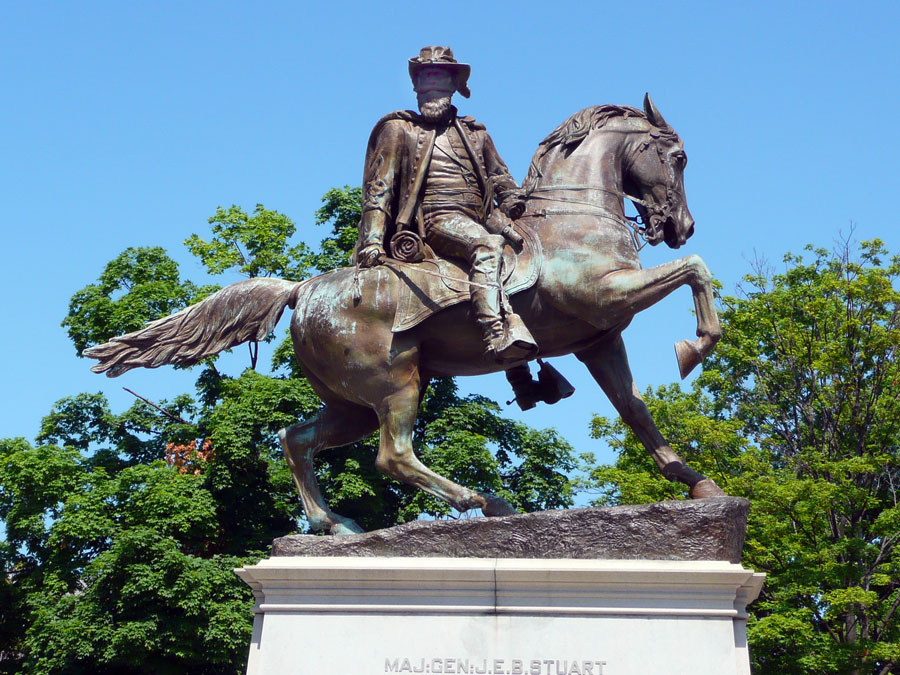
J.E.B. Stuart statue on Monument Avenue, taken down on July 7, 2020.

Primary architectural styles represented include:

- Italianate
- Richardsonian Romanesque
- Queen Anne
- Colonial Revival

Other architectural styles include:

- Tudor Revival
- Second Empire
- Beaux-Arts
- Art Deco
- Spanish
- Gothic Revival
- Bungalow
- American Arts and Crafts Movement
- James River Georgian
- Southern Colonial
- Jacobethan (Jacobean Revival)
- Federal

== History ==
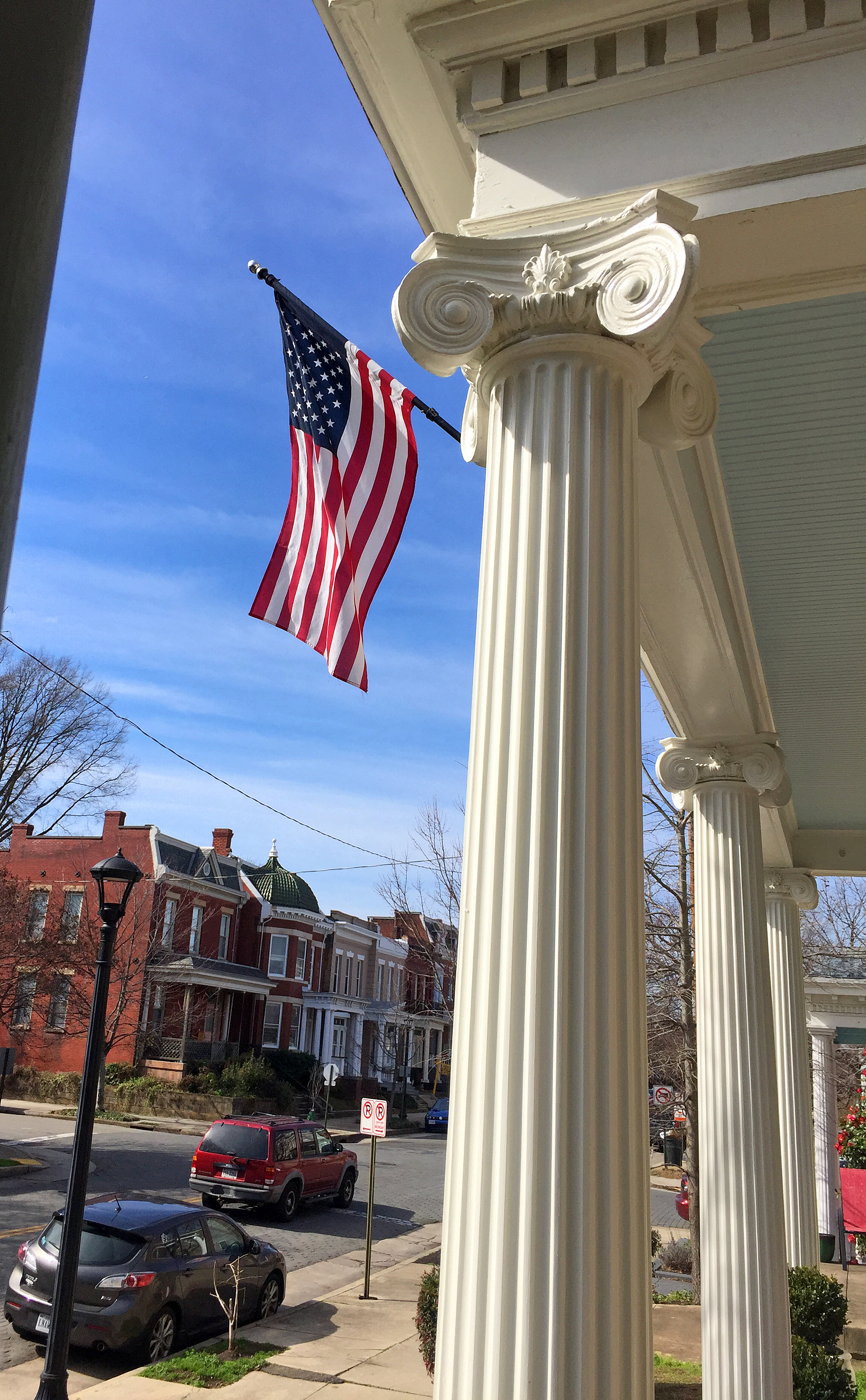
The 2200 block of West Grace Street in Richmond, Virginia.

In 1817, the Fan was plotted as the village of Sydney on land formerly owned by William Byrd II. Primary development of the Fan occurred after the Civil War through about 1920. Streetcar lines leading from downtown influenced development; the nation's first electric streetcar system was inaugurated in Richmond in 1888.

As development increased from downtown at the turn of the 20th century, Franklin Street became a fashionable "West End" address. A desire for a West End address drove rapid real estate development of the area, changing the area from rural tobacco fields in 1880 to being almost fully developed land by the 1920s. As development accelerated, the University of Richmond (then located on Lombardy Street) was moved west to a more rural location (its present Westhampton location). During the Great Depression, many of the single-family homes in the area were converted to apartments.

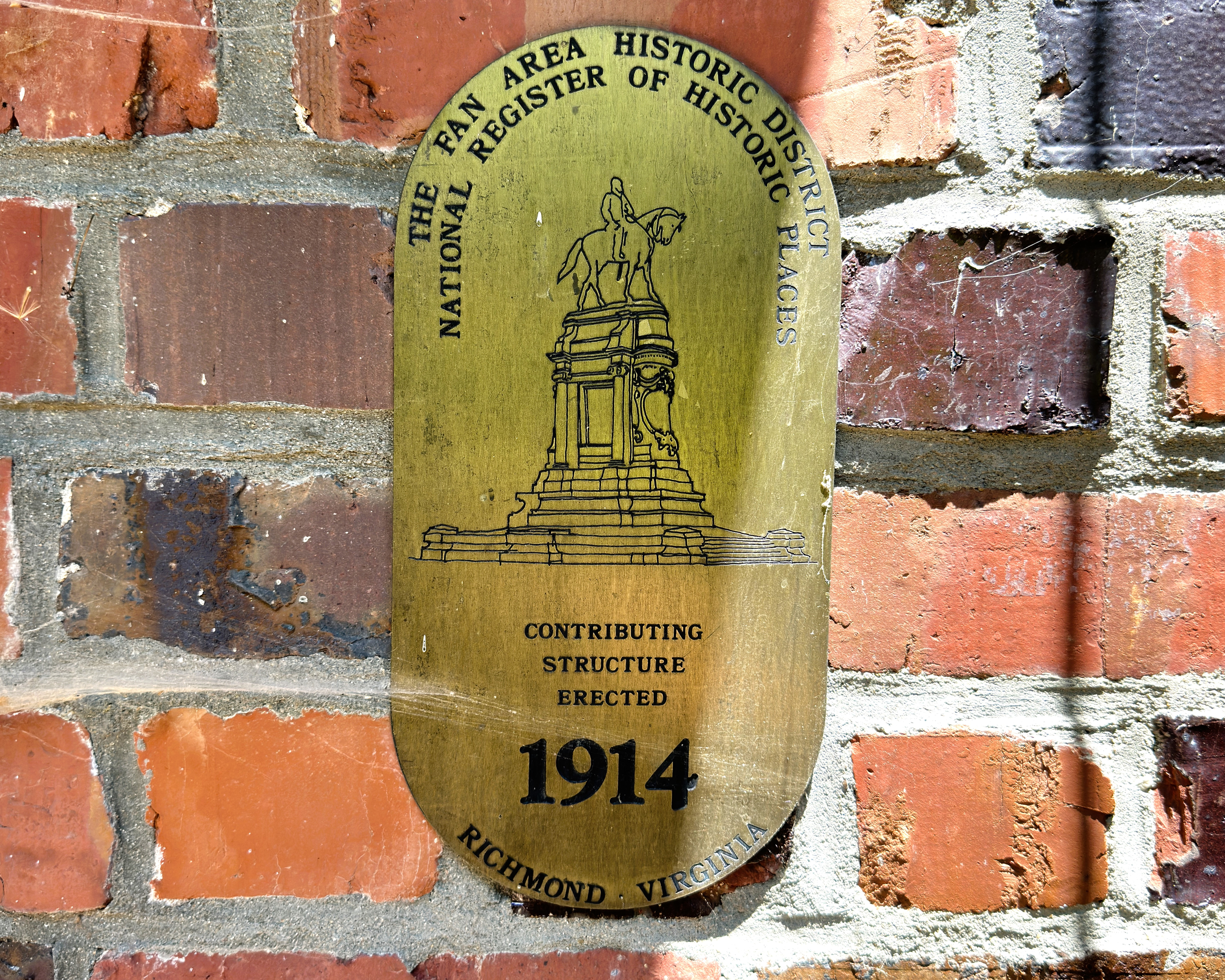
A plaque noting when a building in the Fan was built as part of the National Register of Historic Places.

The term "the Fan" was coined in the mid 20th century by a Richmond Times Dispatch editorial, as the appellation "West End" no longer applied. In 1985, the Fan was added to the National Register of Historic Places, and various buildings around the Fan are adorned with plaques noting this and when the building was built.

== Maps ==
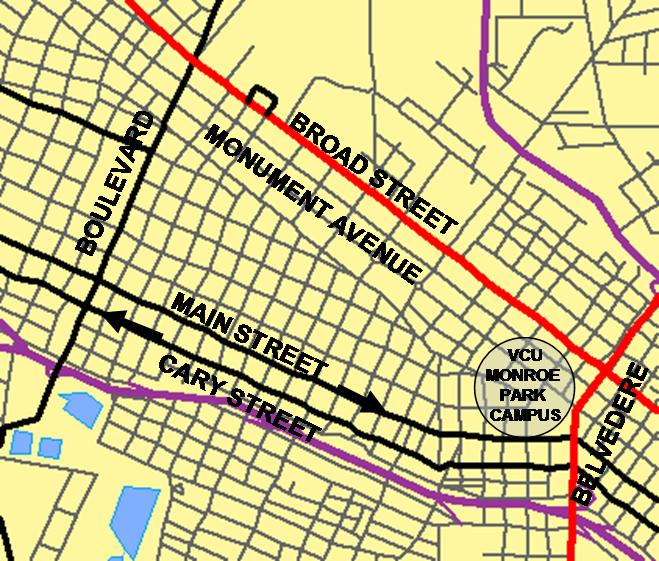
The boundaries of the Fan.

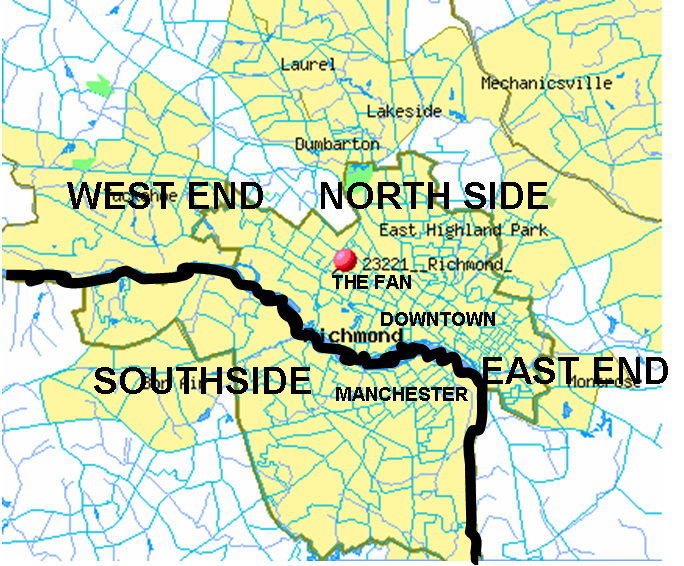
Richmond is often subdivided into North Side, Southside, East End and West End.

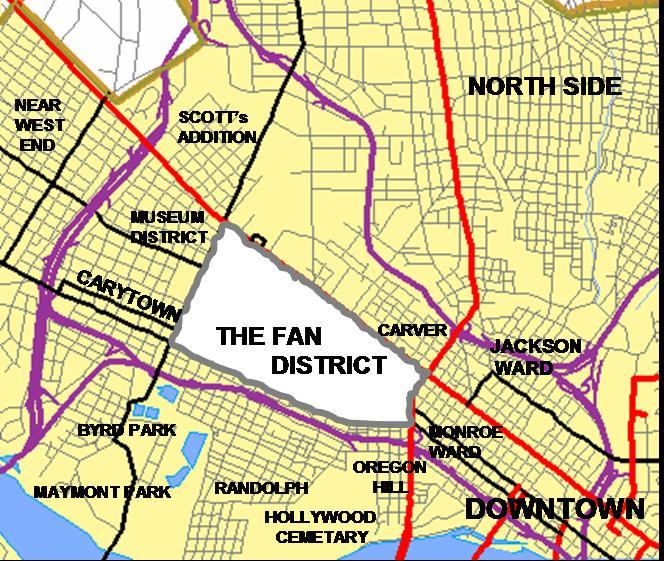
The Fan is one of many other Neighborhoods of Richmond Virginia
