= Boulevard Bridge =

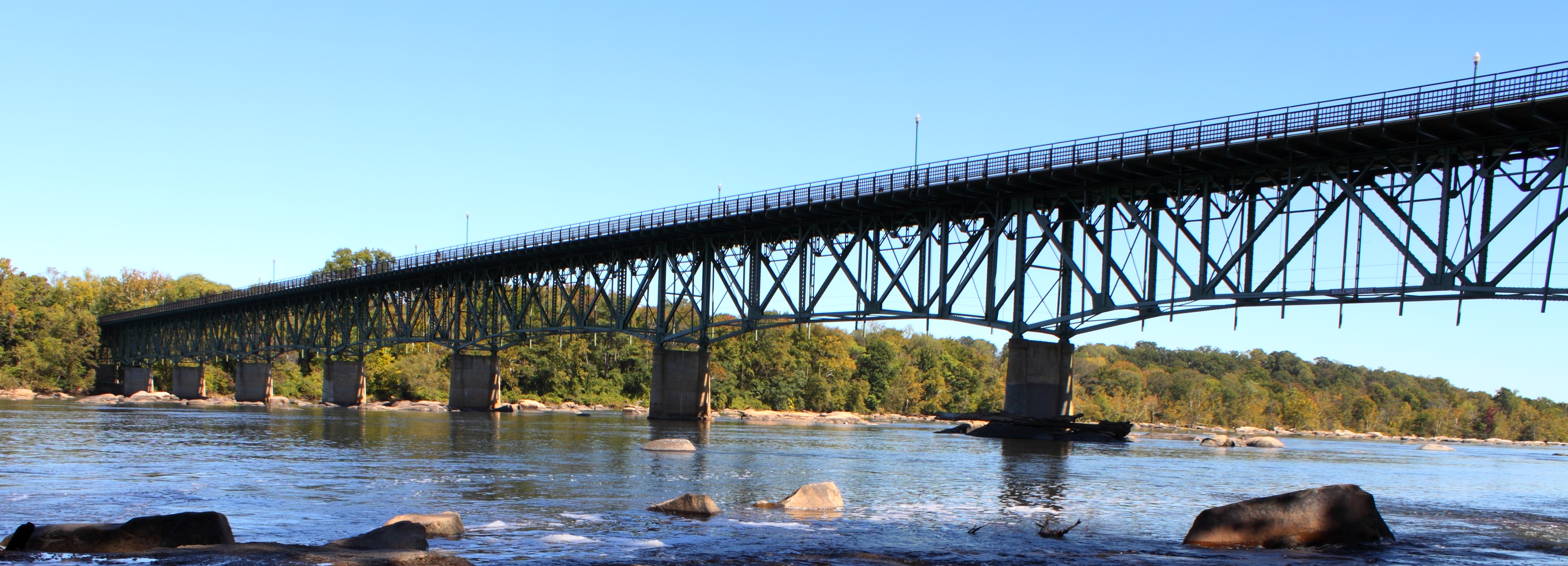
- Boulevard Bridge from the south side of the James River
- Coordinates: 37°31′54″N 77°29′02″W
- Carries: SR 161
- Crosses: James River
- Locale: Richmond, Virginia
- Official name: Boulevard Bridge
- Other name: Nickel Bridge
- Maintained by: Richmond Metropolitan Authority

Characteristics
- Design: deck truss bridge
- Total length: 2,030 feet

History
- Opened: 1925

Statistics
- Toll: $0.50 E-ZPass

Location
- Interactive map of Boulevard Bridge

Boulevard Bridge in the independent city of Richmond, Virginia is a toll bridge which carries State Route 161 across the James River. Despite the renovation work in the early 1990s, weight restrictions on the bridge limit vehicles to under 7,500 lbs. It is 2,030 feet (620 m) long.

== History ==
The Boulevard Bridge was completed in 1925. It was privately owned and financed by the Boulevard Bridge Corporation for the purpose of providing access to the new Westover Hills neighborhood in South Richmond, where one of the selling points of the homes was free bridge access. It is named for The Boulevard, a main route through Richmond that ends just north of the bridge in Byrd Park. For many years, 5-cent tolls were collected at a toll booth midway on the span, and it became widely known as the "Nickel Bridge". Some years later, tolls were increased to 10 cents, and the nickname became the "Dime Bridge". However, despite all subsequent toll increases, it is still known today as the "nickel bridge" to many locals.

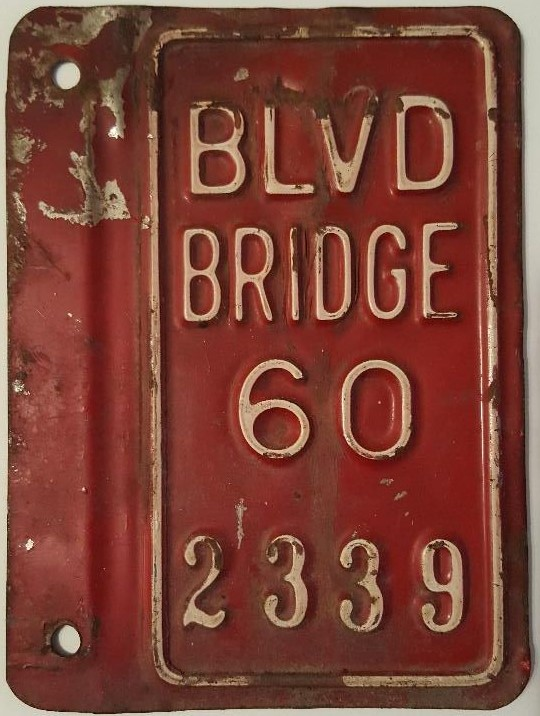
Toll plate issued by Boulevard Bridge Corporation in mid 20th century

During the years of ownership by the Boulevard Bridge Corporation, Westover Hills residents were given free access across the bridge by the use of a special license plate that was attached below the state plates on their cars. These plates had to be applied for and were also sold to the general public. They were changed each year, and in the last years before Richmond Metropolitan Authority (RMA) control, windshield stickers were used.

Initially, the early toll-barrier was located in the middle of the span (actually above the north shore of the river between the canal and the north end), because all the property on either side except the right-of-way for the roadway itself was owned by others, and the toll barrier at that location could be erected at no additional land acquisition expense. It was certainly not possible to circumvent paying the toll at that location. The toll booths were relocated to a plaza north of the bridge in the mid-1960s.

On November 24, 1969, the RMA, which was building Richmond's new expressway system at the time, purchased the Boulevard Bridge for $1.2 million. The toll on the bridge was kept at 10 cents until 1988, when it was doubled to 20 cents.

In August 1992, the RMA closed the bridge for 18 months to complete extensive renovation work, which included widening the existing lanes, installing new toll booths and equipment on the north end of the bridge, and improving safe access for bicycles and pedestrians. The bridge reopened in October 1993.

The toll was increased in 1998 to 25 cents.

In 2008, the RMA increased the tolls on all of its roads, bringing the Boulevard Bridge to the rate of 35 cents.

== Tolls ==
The current toll rate is 50 cents or 45 cents with EZ-Pass.
