= Cary Street Park and Shop Center =

Historic commercial building in Virginia, United States

- U.S. National Register of Historic Places
- Virginia Landmarks Register
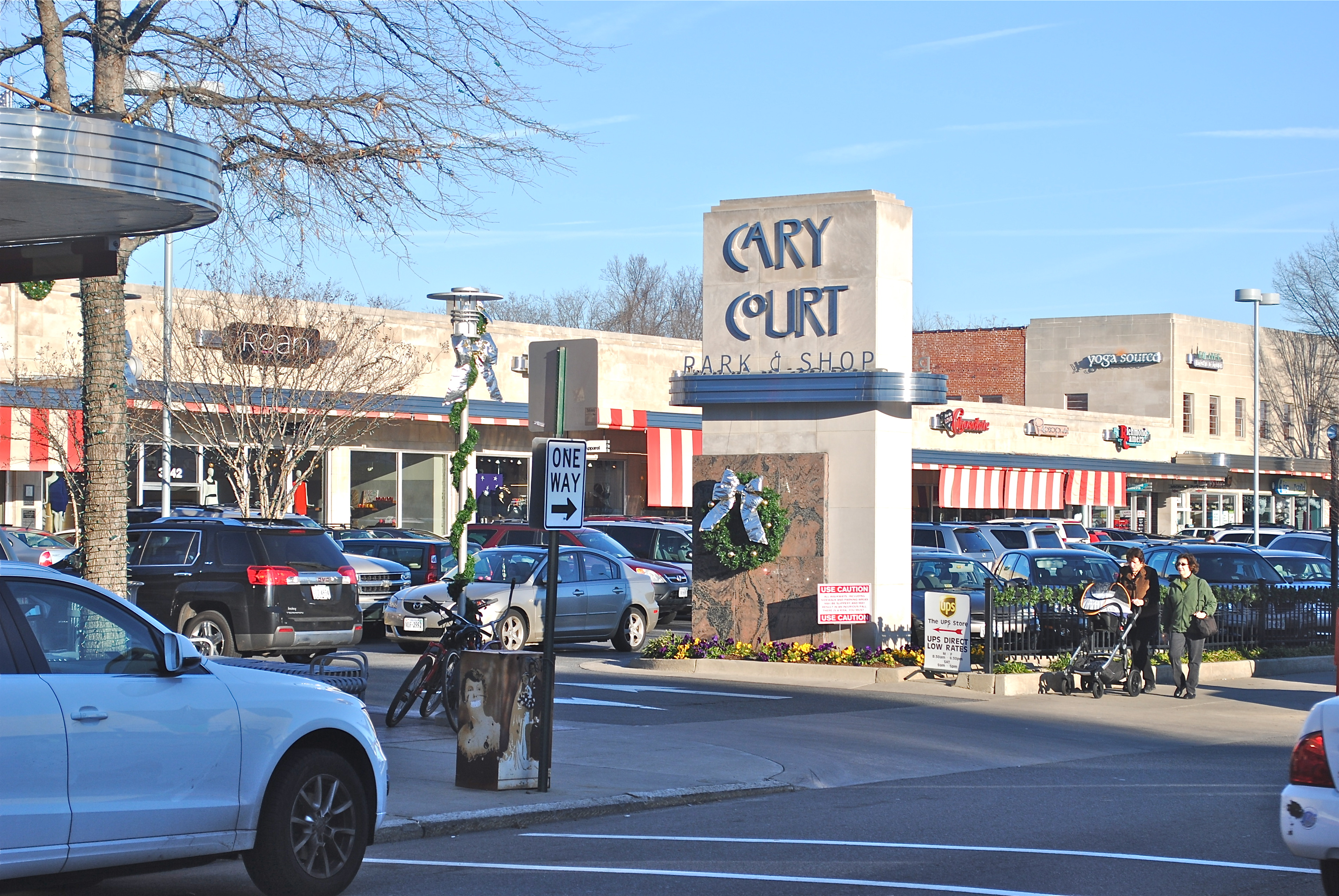
- Cary Street Park and Shop Center, December 2011

- Location within Virginia Location within the United States
- Location: 3120-3158 West Cary St., Richmond, Virginia
- Coordinates: 37°33′13″N 77°28′55″W
- Area: 2.1 acres (0.85 ha)
- Built: 1938
- Architect: Dillon, Julian H.; Messerschmidt, Henry Carl
- Architectural style: Art Deco
- NRHP reference No.: 01000701
- VLR No.: 127-0438

Significant dates
- Added to NRHP: July 5, 2001
- Designated VLR: June 14, 2000

Cary Street Park and Shop Center, also known as the Cary Court Shopping Center, is a historic shopping center developed by the C.F. Sauer family in the Carytown district of Richmond, Virginia. It was built in 1938 in the Art Deco style. Two rectangular wings to the west and east were completed in 1949 and 1951. The structure is essentially a one-story structure in the shape of an elongated "U" and constructed of brick, granite, limestone and marble veneer. It features a prominent parking area, an uninterrupted string of large modern aluminum and glass doors and commercial storefront windows, a stepped limestone parapet, curved windows, and a low, projecting stucco canopy.

It was listed on the National Register of Historic Places in 2001.
