= Museum District, Richmond, Virginia =

- West of Boulevard Historic District
- U.S. National Register of Historic Places
- U.S. Historic district
- Virginia Landmarks Register
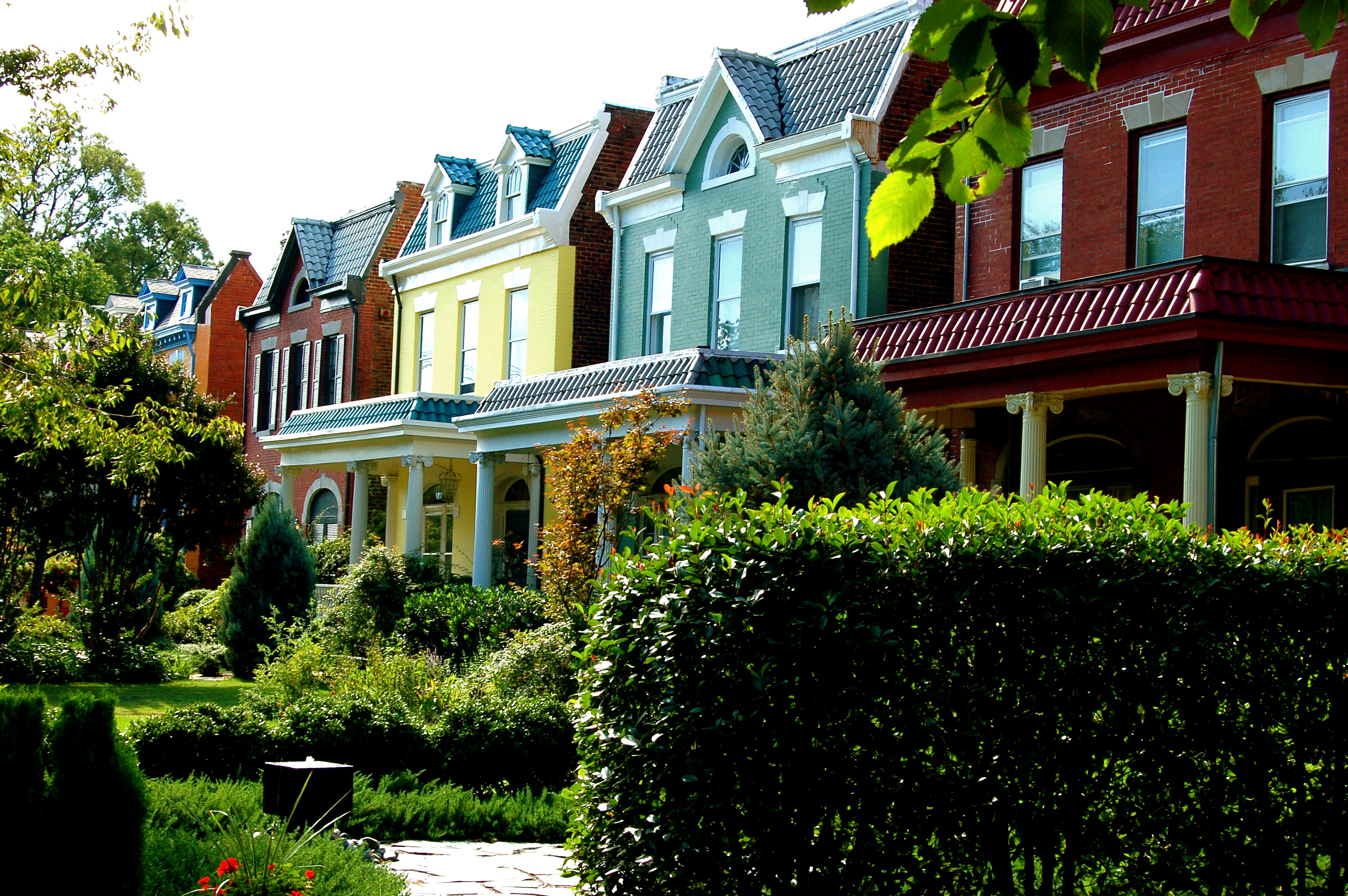

- Location within Virginia Location within the United States
- Location: Roughly bounded by Colonial Ave., W. Grace St., Cutshaw Ave., Thompson St., and Ellwood Ave., Richmond, Virginia
- Coordinates: 37°33′35″N 77°28′46″W
- Area: 249 acres (101 ha)
- Architect: Multiple
- Architectural style: Multiple
- NRHP reference No.: 94000153
- VLR No.: 127-0742

Significant dates
- Added to NRHP: March 07, 1994
- Designated VLR: December 8, 1993

The Museum District, alternately known as West of the Boulevard, is a neighborhood in the city of Richmond, Virginia. It is anchored by the contiguous six-block tract of museums along the west side of Boulevard, including the Virginia Museum of Fine Arts and the Virginia Museum of History & Culture, hence the name.

It is roughly bounded by the Boulevard (and the Fan District) on the east, I-195 on the west, Monument Avenue and Broad Street on the north, and Carytown on the south. Much of that is listed as a historic district on the National Register of Historic Places.

Parts of the area had been in active use as farmland into the late 19th century, and though part was notably used as a Civil War veteran's home at that time, it was primarily developed between 1895 and 1940. It is largely populated with townhouses in styles from the late 19th and early 20th centuries. Though much of the district is residential, there are several schools, religious facilities, and other institutional uses throughout, as well as local restaurants and stores, especially in the "Devil's Triangle" area Carytown generally serves as the shopping district for the area, and in fact the distinction between Carytown and the Museum District is fairly blurry.

The Devil's Triangle is the largest business district in the neighborhood, outside of the streets adjoining Carytown, but there are many small corner stores and restaurants throughout the neighborhood.
