= Woods Mill, Virginia =

Unincorporated community in Virginia, US

Coordinates: 37°50′42″N 78°49′20″W

Woods Mill is an unincorporated community in Nelson County, Virginia, United States. It was among the communities severely affected by flash flooding from Hurricane Camille in 1969.
