= Broad Street (Richmond, Virginia) =

Coordinates: 37°32′45″N 77°26′35″W

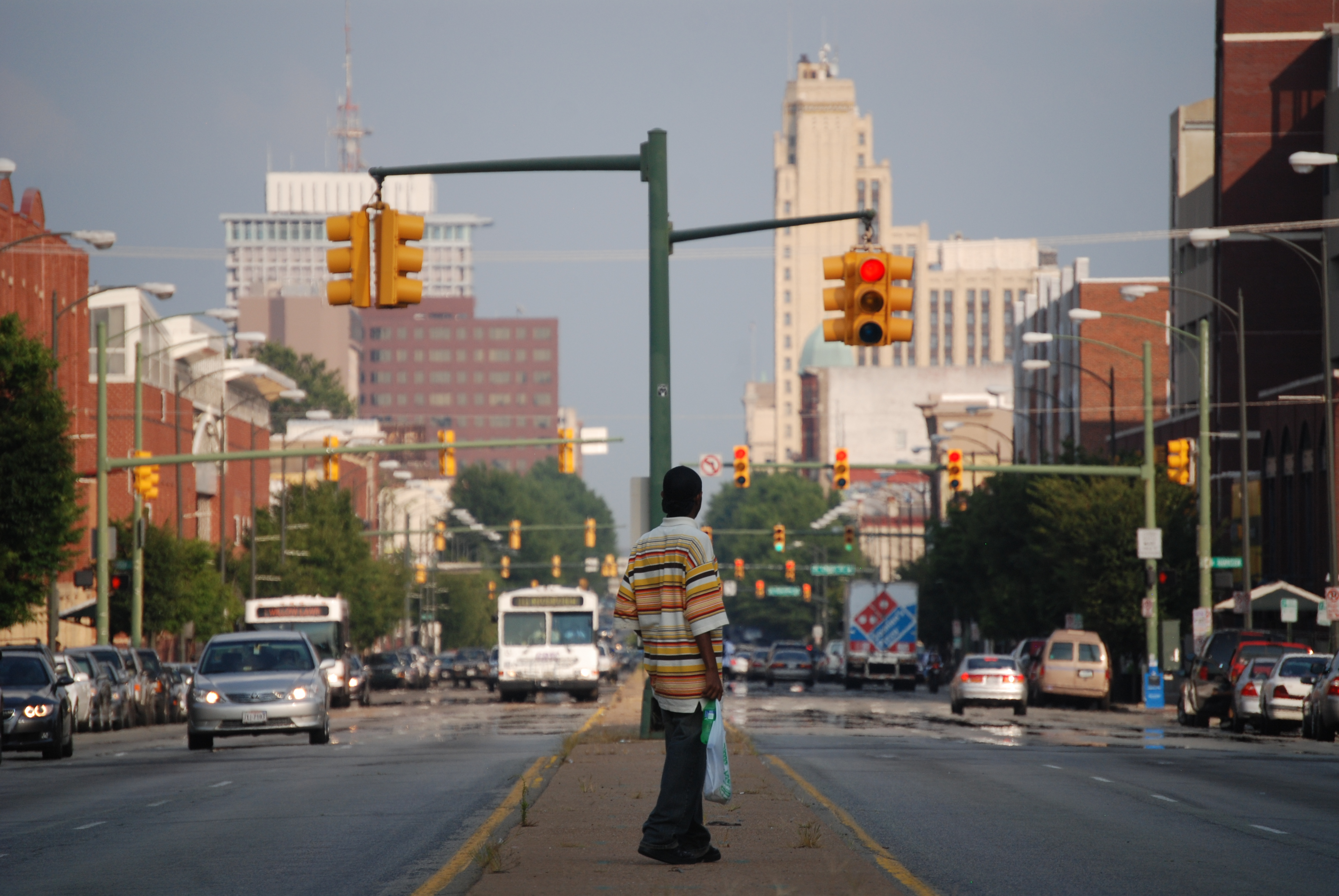
Looking East on Broad Street at VCU (July 2009)

Broad Street is a 15-mile-long (24 km) road located in the independent city of Richmond, Virginia, and adjacent Henrico County. Broad Street is significant to Richmond due to the many commercial establishments that have been built along it throughout Richmond's history. From downtown through miles into the suburbs, the street is largely dedicated to retailing and offices, including regional and neighborhood shopping centers and malls.

== Description ==
The east end of Broad Street is located at the northeastern edge of Chimborazo Park. It extends through Church Hill to Downtown Richmond. Also known as U.S. Route 250 west of Downtown Richmond, it extends west through Richmond's West End all the way to the outermost suburbs of Richmond just beyond Short Pump near the intersection of I-295 and I-64.

Continuing west into Goochland County Broad Street becomes Broad Street Rd. U.S. Route 250; the road extends all the way to Sandusky, OH.

The GRTC Pulse bus rapid transit line follows Broad Street from its terminus at the Willow Lawn station on the western edge of the city east to 14th Street in Downtown Richmond.

== History and development ==
=== Origins ===
When the city was originally laid out circa 1744 by Col. William Mayo, Richmond was a small area along the James River. What is now called East Broad Street was its northern border. The street was situated uphill from the town. Due to gullies and other terrain issues, it was hard to get to, from the central Main Street area, until Capitol Square was built. The Broad corridor was referred to as "upper country."

Richmond's city streets had no names until 1780, when Thomas Jefferson's plan named it H Street. It was informally referred to as Haxall street for a while, but the name didn't stick. "H" remained the name until Broad Street acquired its current name in 1845. Areas north of that were what an early chronicler called the non-tax paying side, as they were outside of city limits. To the west, Broad connected to Richmond Road. Broad Street ceased to be the county line when an adjoining portion of Henrico County was annexed by the jurisdictionally independent City of Richmond in 1867.

=== Downtown ===
- Broad Street Commercial Historic District
- U.S. National Register of Historic Places
- U.S. Historic district
- Virginia Landmarks Register
- Richmond City Historic District
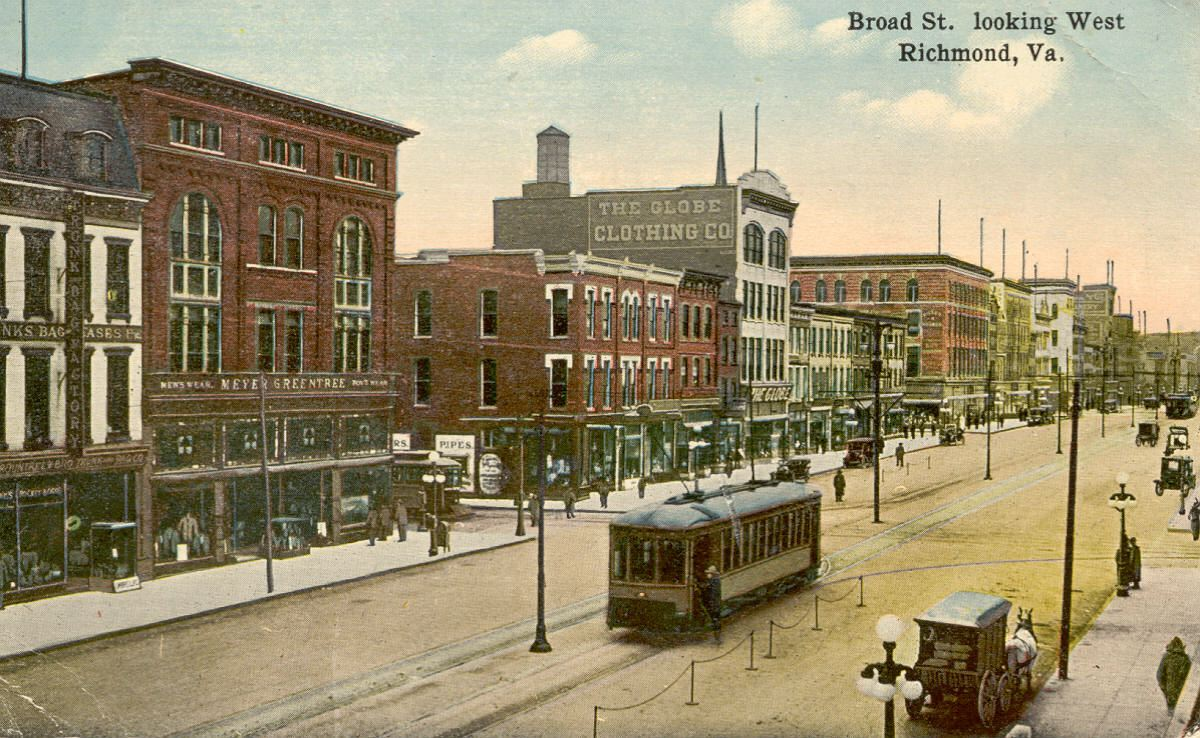
- 1913 postcard view of Broad Street, looking South, at 7th and Broad Streets. Note the streetcars.

- Location within Virginia Location within the United States
- Location: Along Broad St. area roughly bounded by Belvidere, Marshall, Fourth and Grace, Richmond, Virginia
- Area: 29 acres (12 ha)
- Architectural style: Classical Revival, Italianate
- NRHP reference No.: 87000611 (original); 04000851 (increase 1); 07000219 (increase 2)
- VLR No.: 127-0375

Significant dates
- Added to NRHP: April 09, 1987
- Boundary increases: August 11, 2004; March 27, 2007
- Designated VLR: October 14, 1986

Broad Street connects many historical sites in Downtown Richmond. It is home to the lavish Empire Theatre, which is the state's oldest operating theatre. Theatre IV, the Children's Theatre of Virginia, the second largest children's theatre in the nation, owns the Empire and presents its mainstage season there in downtown Richmond. Until the late 19th century, the trains of the Richmond, Fredericksburg and Potomac Railroad ran down the center of the street from the present Harrison Street east to Eighth Street. The area around Sixth and Broad Streets was the center of retailing in the Southeast, with department stores such as Miller & Rhoads, Thalhimers, G. C. Murphy, Woolworth, Raylass, Sears, Cohen's and W. T. Grant and niche retailers like Hofheimer's. It was also home to "theater row", which included venues such as the National.

It has also been the site of major institutional structures, including Monumental Church, the Library of Virginia, the present and former city halls, and the Virginia Department of Transportation headquarters.

In 1919, the Richmond, Fredericksburg and Potomac Railroad relocated its terminal to the more suburban Broad Street Station.

=== West End ===
As Richmond moved westward, so did the retail district. Miles away, Short Pump Town Center in western Henrico County on Broad Street has leading retailers including Macy's and Dillard's.

== See also ==
- Transportation in Richmond, Virginia
