= Short Pump, Virginia =

- Census-designated place
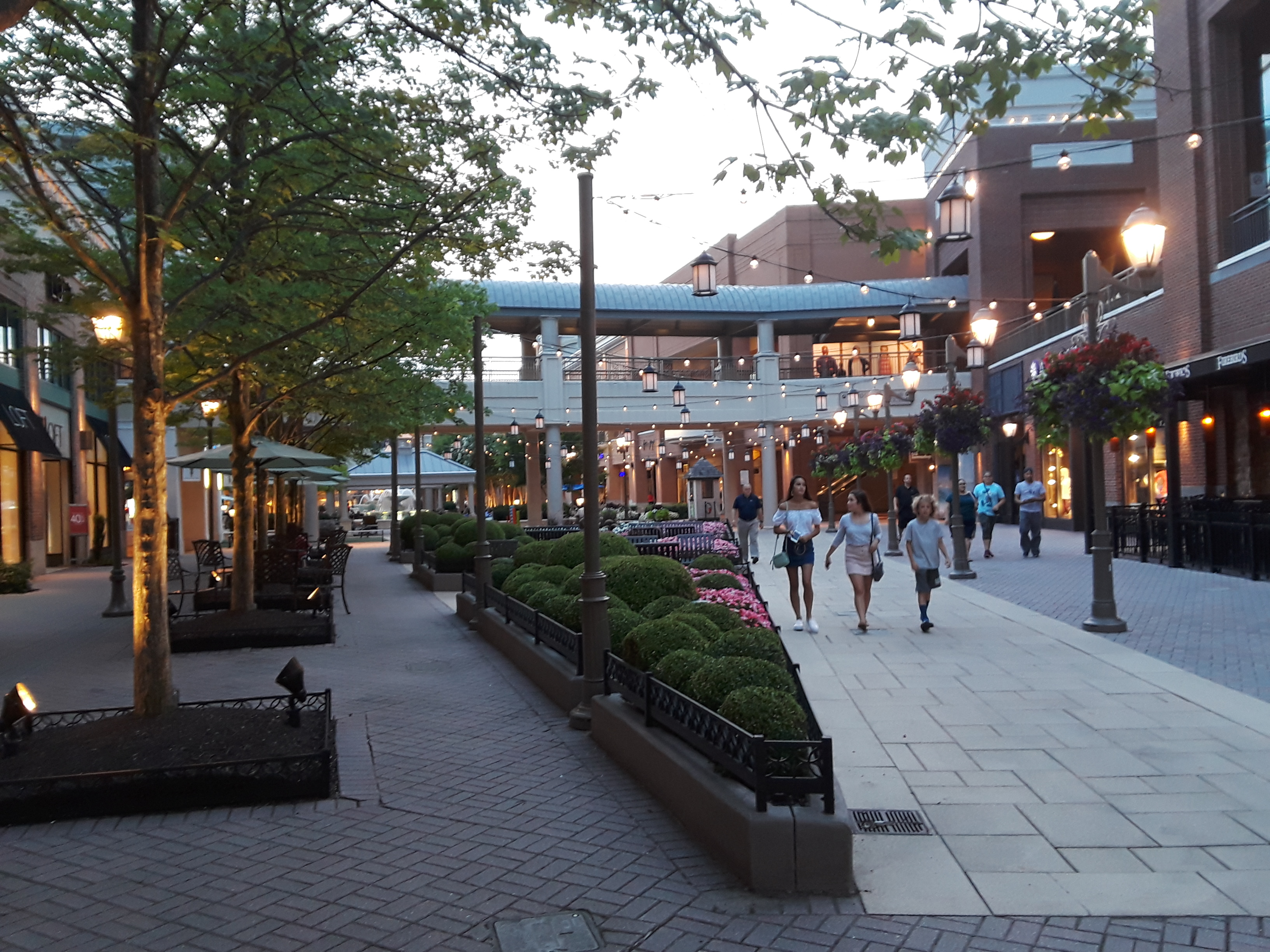
- Short Pump Town Center at dusk

- Location within Virginia Location within the United States
- Coordinates: 37°39′43″N 77°37′36″W
- Country: United States
- State: Virginia
- County: Henrico

Area
  - Total: 9.1 sq mi (23.5 km^{2})
  - Land: 9.0 sq mi (23.2 km^{2})
  - Water: 0.12 sq mi (0.3 km^{2})
- Elevation: 282 ft (86 m)

Population (2020)
  - Total: 30,626
  - Density: 3,420/sq mi (1,320/km^{2})
- Time zone: UTC−5 (Eastern (EST))
  - Summer (DST): UTC−4 (EDT)
- FIPS code: 51-72272
- GNIS feature ID: 1495125

Short Pump is a census-designated place (CDP) in Henrico County, Virginia, United States. It is a suburb of Richmond. The population was 30,626 at the 2020 census.

The original village of Short Pump was located at the intersection of Three Chopt Road (formerly known as Three Notched Trail), Richmond Turnpike and Pouncey Tract Road. The area first centered around a local tavern that was expanded by Col. Robert H. Saunders beginning in 1814. According to local legend, it was named for the short handled water pump for stagecoach horses to drink from, which was located beneath the porch of the tavern, though there is some debate over the name's origin. This area was on the principal route between Richmond and Charlottesville, as well as other towns in the Blue Ridge Mountains. Thomas Jefferson, the Earl Cornwallis, the Marquis de Lafayette, General Peter Muhlenberg, Stonewall Jackson and Ulric Dahlgren all visited this area.

The crossroads was officially named Short Pump by 1853, according to a Henrico County map found in the Virginia Historical Society.

It has now become part of Richmond's Far West End. In 2003, developers opened Short Pump Town Center, a 1,200,000-square-foot (110,000 m^{2}) open air shopping mall. Other shopping and living spaces include West Broad Village.

Short Pump is noted for its shopping centers, restaurants, skating rink, and bowling alley. The area is an edge city of Richmond.

== History ==
Short Pump began as a local tavern stop situated at a strategic crossroads in the early nineteenth century. Purchased around 1814 by Col. Saunders, the tavern profited from the local coal industry, westward movement in the state, and the extension of roads in the period after the Revolutionary War. Along with the food, drink, and lodgings that taverns typically provided for visitors, this tavern served as a post-office, voting precinct, and local market during its roughly 35 years in business. It also briefly housed a school for young white men and a resident doctor. While a gathering spot for white locals and travelers, the tavern relied on enslaved labor and hosted occasional slave auctions.

The tavern eventually declined in the latter half of the nineteenth century, but the name stuck to the area. By the early twentieth century, the tavern was all but gone, and other buildings and businesses rose up to take its place. As automobiles replaced horses as the primary means of transportation, filling stations and garages popped up in the area. At the same time, those living in Short Pump increasingly saw themselves as a suburb of Richmond and worked to better their community through the building of new structures—like the Short Pump High School.

By the 1990s and 2000s, Short Pump transformed from a rural crossroads to an edge-city, a concentration of development on the outskirts of traditional urban areas. The Short Pump Town Center, a mega-mall, proved key to this transformation.

== Geography ==
According to the United States Census Bureau, the CDP has a total area of 9.1 square miles (23.5 km^{2}), of which 9.0 square miles (23.2 km^{2}) is land and 0.12 square miles (0.3 km^{2}), or 1.33%, is water. Short Pump is bordered to the west by Goochland County, to the north by the Wyndham CDP, to the east by the Innsbrook CDP, and to the south by non-CDP land and by Tuckahoe.

=== Climate ===
Climate data for Short Pump, Virginia (1980-2010)
Month	Jan	Feb	Mar	Apr	May	Jun	Jul	Aug	Sep	Oct	Nov	Dec	Year
Mean daily maximum °F (°C)	46.6 (8.1)	50.7 (10.4)	59.3 (15.2)	70 (21)	77.2 (25.1)	84.9 (29.4)	88.3 (31.3)	86.9 (30.5)	80.6 (27.0)	70.3 (21.3)	60.3 (15.7)	49.5 (9.7)	68.7 (20.4)
Mean daily minimum °F (°C)	24.8 (−4.0)	26.9 (−2.8)	33.1 (0.6)	42.3 (5.7)	51.2 (10.7)	60.7 (15.9)	65.1 (18.4)	63.9 (17.7)	56.2 (13.4)	44.5 (6.9)	35.4 (1.9)	27.6 (−2.4)	44.3 (6.8)
Average precipitation inches (mm)	3.1 (79)	2.9 (74)	3.8 (97)	3.3 (84)	3.9 (99)	3.5 (89)	4.4 (110)	4.0 (100)	3.7 (94)	3.3 (84)	3.7 (94)	3.3 (84)	42.9 (1,088)
Source: USA.com

== Demographics ==
Historical population
Census	Pop.	Note	%±
2010	24,729		—
2020	30,626		23.8%
U.S. Decennial Census; 2000 2010

Short Pump was first listed as a census designated place in the 2000 U.S. census.

Ancestry in Three Chopt CCD (2014-2018)
Origin	percent
English American (Includes "American" ancestry)	20.1%
South Asian American (Includes Indian, Pakistani, Bangladeshi, etc.)	15%
Scottish or Irish American (Including Scots-Irish)	13.9%
German American	13.5%
African American (Does not include West Indian or African)	6.2%
East Asian American (Includes Chinese, Japanese, Vietnamese, etc.	5.5%
Italian American	4.7%
French American	2.2%
Polish American	2%
Scandinavian American (Also includes Iceland, Finland, and Baltic States)	2%

=== Racial and ethnic composition ===
Short Pump CDP, Virginia – Racial and ethnic composition Note: the US Census treats Hispanic/Latino as an ethnic category. This table excludes Latinos from the racial categories and assigns them to a separate category. Hispanics/Latinos may be of any race.
Race / Ethnicity (NH = Non-Hispanic)	Pop 2010	Pop 2020	% 2010	% 2020
White alone (NH)	17,993	17,825	72.76%	58.20%
Black or African American alone (NH)	1,383	2,262	5.59%	7.39%
Native American or Alaska Native alone (NH)	29	69	0.12%	0.23%
Asian alone (NH)	3,929	7,856	15.89%	25.65%
Native Hawaiian or Pacific Islander alone (NH)	3	11	0.01%	0.04%
Other race alone (NH)	52	164	0.21%	0.54%
Mixed race or Multiracial (NH)	556	1,156	2.25%	3.77%
Hispanic or Latino (any race)	784	1,283	3.17%	4.19%
Total	24,729	30,626	100.00%	100.00%

=== 2020 census ===
As of the 2020 census, Short Pump had a population of 30,626. The median age was 37.4 years. 26.1% of residents were under the age of 18 and 11.6% of residents were 65 years of age or older. For every 100 females there were 94.5 males, and for every 100 females age 18 and over there were 90.7 males age 18 and over.

99.8% of residents lived in urban areas, while 0.2% lived in rural areas.

There were 11,396 households in Short Pump, of which 41.3% had children under the age of 18 living in them. Of all households, 60.2% were married-couple households, 13.9% were households with a male householder and no spouse or partner present, and 22.4% were households with a female householder and no spouse or partner present. About 22.8% of all households were made up of individuals and 7.1% had someone living alone who was 65 years of age or older.

There were 11,958 housing units, of which 4.7% were vacant. The homeowner vacancy rate was 1.0% and the rental vacancy rate was 6.1%.

Racial composition as of the 2020 census
Race	Number	Percent
White	18,159	59.3%
Black or African American	2,309	7.5%
American Indian and Alaska Native	81	0.3%
Asian	7,873	25.7%
Native Hawaiian and Other Pacific Islander	12	0.0%
Some other race	410	1.3%
Two or more races	1,782	5.8%

=== 2010 census ===
At the 2010 census, there were 24,729 people, 9,217 households and 6,483 families residing in the CDP. The population density was 76.7 people per square mile (29.6 people/km^{2}). There were 77 housing units at an average density of 32.5 units per square mile (12.5 units/km^{2}). The racial makeup of the CDP was 75.0% White, 5.70% African-American, 15.9% Asian, and 3.2% Hispanic or Latino.

There were 9,217 households, of which 31.9% had children under the age of 18 living with them, 60.3% were married couples living together, 10.1% had a female householder with no husband present, and 36.2% were non-families. 26.1% of all households were made up of individuals, and 8.7% had someone living alone who was 65 years of age or older. The average household size was 2.64 and the average family size was 3.30.

26.9% of the population were under the age of 18, 6.0% from 18 to 24, 33.5% from 25 to 44, 18.1% from 45 to 64, and 15.4% who were 65 years of age or older.

The median household income was $105,300 and the median family income was $117,995. The per capita income for the CDP was $46,047. 4.1% of the population lived below the poverty line.

== Education ==
=== Elementary schools ===
- Colonial Trail Elementary School
- Rivers Edge Elementary School
- Gayton Elementary School
- Nuckols Farm Elementary School
- Short Pump Elementary School
- Twin Hickory Elementary School
- David A. Kaechele Elementary School

=== Middle ===
- Holman Middle School
- Pocahontas Middle School
- Short Pump Middle School

=== High ===
- Deep Run High School
- Mills E. Godwin High School
