= Short Pump Town Center =

- Location: Short Pump, Virginia, United States
- Coordinates: 37°39′21.8″N 77°37′9.7″W
- Address: 11800 West Broad Street (Note: The mall officially has a "Richmond" mailing address, but Richmond is an independent city not under auspices of any county. Therefore, the mall is not in Richmond city limits but in an unincorporated area of Henrico County.)
- Opened: September 4, 2003
- Developer: Forest City Enterprises
- Manager: GGP
- Owner: GGP
- Num. of stores: 140
- Num. of anchor tenants: 4 (3 open, 1 vacant)
- Floor area: 1,300,000 square feet (120,000 m^{2})
- Floors: 2
- Website: shortpumptowncenter.com

Short Pump Town Center is an open-air shopping mall located in the Short Pump census-designated place (CDP) of unincorporated Henrico County, Virginia on West Broad Street (U.S. Route 250), approximately 1 mile (1.6 km) west of I-64, exit 178A/B. Short Pump Town Center is home to many restaurants and stores including Macy's and Dillard's.

== History and stores ==
Short Pump Town Center is a two-level, open-air retail center composed of upscale stores. It was opened on September 4, 2003 and has over 140 stores. The center is owned and operated by Queensland Investment Corporation.

In 2004, Circuit City opened outside the mall. After Circuit City went out of business in 2009, it was replaced by hhgregg. Hhgregg closed for good in 2017. This space is now occupied by Arhaus and The Container Store.

Anchor stores are Dick's Sporting Goods, Dillard's, and Macy's (originally Hecht's until 2006). The mall was also intended to have a Lord & Taylor as an additional anchor, until they pulled out from that plan after being repositioned.

On May 7, 2020, Nordstrom announced that they would be closing their location at the mall as part of a national downsizing resulting from the COVID-19 pandemic. On June 16, 2025, it was announced that the former Nordstrom store would be replaced by a Dick's Sporting Goods experimental location, House of Sport, which features sports amenities like batting cages and climbing walls.

== Surrounding area ==
Surrounding the mall, there are several strip malls, other stores, and restaurants within walking or short driving distance. These are on the Town Center property, however they are not a part of the mall itself. They are listed on the mall's store directory despite not being attached to the mall itself.

== Rivalry with Stony Point ==
Following a disagreement with Taubman Centers on a possible mall development project, Stony Point Fashion Park was developed as a direct competitor and opened in 2003 in the same month as Short Pump Town Center. It is smaller but of the same upscale style as Short Pump Town Center. The mall was opened on September 17, 2003.

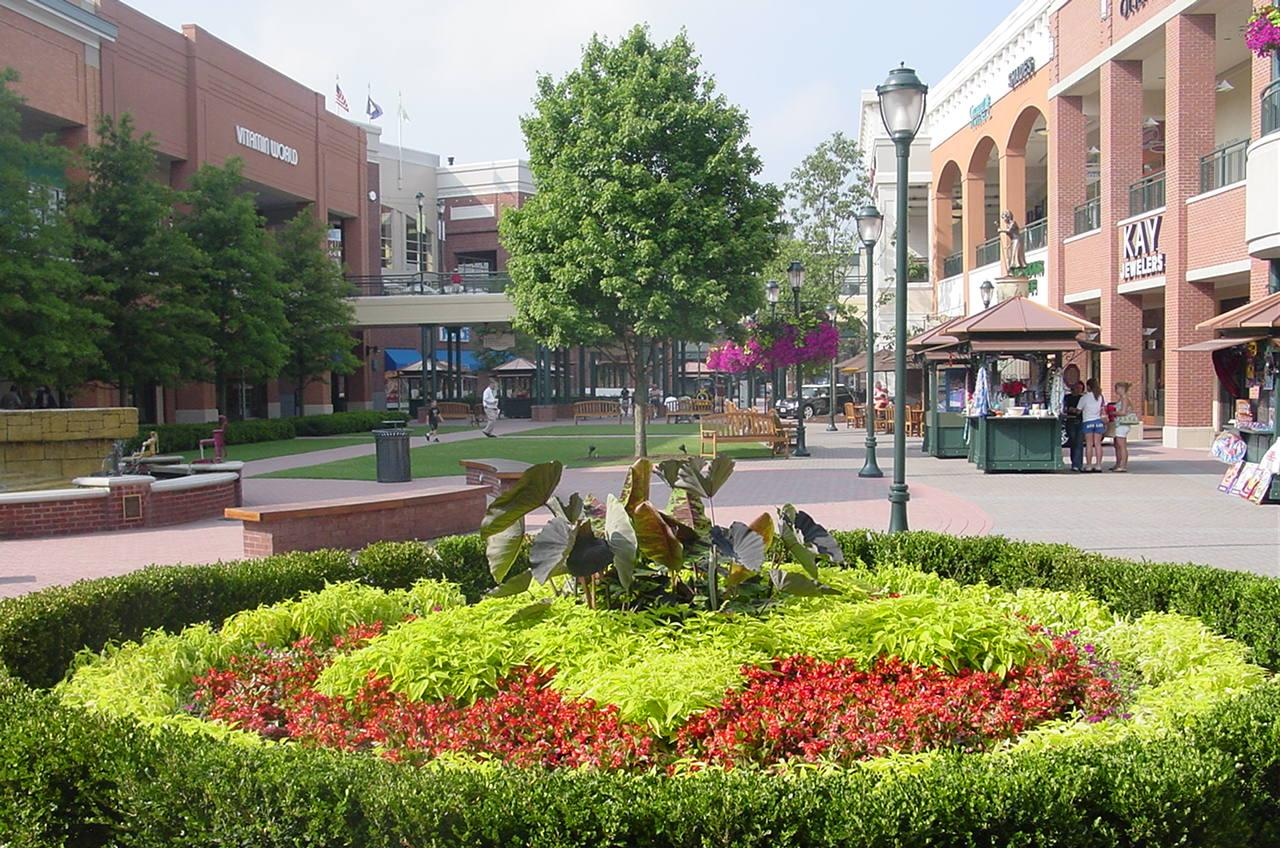
The Mall's Central Courtyard

== The Short Pump Express ==
The 'Short Pump Express' is a trackless train that operates on a loop in Short Pump Town Center. Although marketed at children, the service is open to people of all ages. Service began in 2007. The trains are black or silver, with passengers carts either being dark green, red, or navy blue. The fare for the train is $3.00. The service also allows passengers to purchase 10-ride passes.
