= Lakeside, Virginia =

- Census-designated area
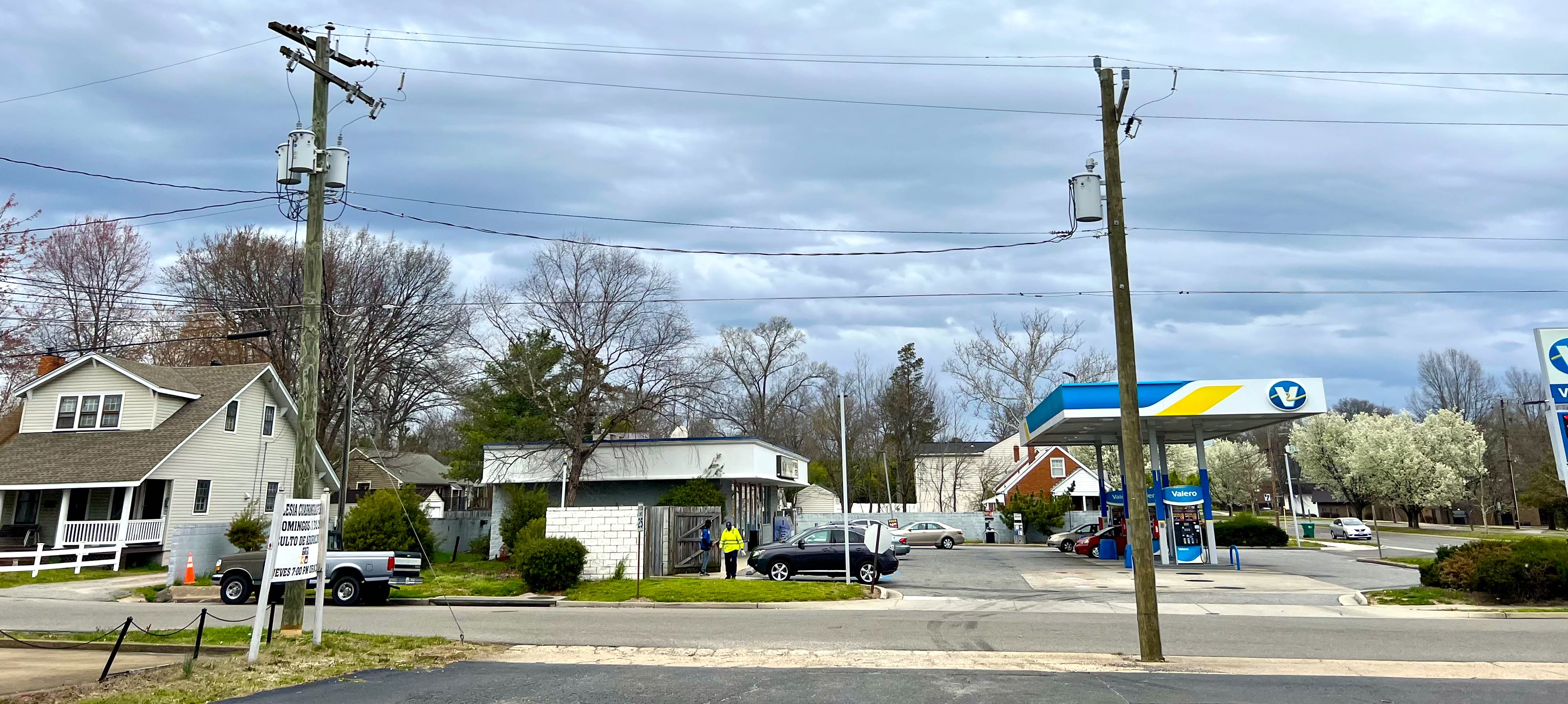
- A house and gas station in Lakeside, Virginia.

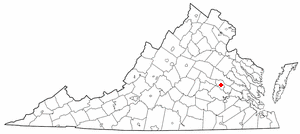
- Location of Lakeside, Virginia
- Coordinates: 37°36′39″N 77°28′33″W
- Country: United States
- State: Virginia
- County: Henrico

Area
  - Total: 4.4 sq mi (11.4 km^{2})
  - Land: 4.3 sq mi (11.2 km^{2})
  - Water: 0.077 sq mi (0.2 km^{2})
- Elevation: 177 ft (54 m)

Population (2020)
  - Total: 12,203
  - Density: 2,820/sq mi (1,090/km^{2})
- Time zone: UTC−5 (Eastern (EST))
  - Summer (DST): UTC−4 (EDT)
- ZIP code: 23228
- Area code: 804
- FIPS code: 51-43464
- GNIS feature ID: 1499637

Lakeside is a census-designated place (CDP) in Henrico County, Virginia, United States. It is an inner suburb of Richmond. The population was 12,203 at the 2020 census.

== Geography ==
According to the United States Census Bureau, the CDP has a total area of 4.4 square miles (11.4 km^{2}), of which 4.3 square miles (11.2 km^{2}) is land and 0.077 square miles (0.2 km^{2}), or 1.58%, is water.

== Demographics ==
Historical population
Census	Pop.	Note	%±
1970	11,137		—
1980	12,289		10.3%
1990	12,081		−1.7%
2000	11,157		−7.6%
2010	11,849		6.2%
2020	12,203		3.0%
U.S. Decennial Census; 1950 1960 1970; 1980 1990 2000; 2010

Lakeside was first listed as an unincorporated community in the 1970 U.S. census; and as a census designated place in the 1980 U.S. census.

=== Racial and ethnic composition ===
Lakeside CDP, Virginia – Racial and ethnic composition Note: the US Census treats Hispanic/Latino as an ethnic category. This table excludes Latinos from the racial categories and assigns them to a separate category. Hispanics/Latinos may be of any race.
Race / Ethnicity (NH = Non-Hispanic)	Pop 2000	Pop 2010	Pop 2020	% 2000	% 2010	% 2020
White alone (NH)	9,493	8,403	7,909	85.09%	70.92%	64.81%
Black or African American alone (NH)	962	1,937	1,941	8.62%	16.35%	15.91%
Native American or Alaska Native alone (NH)	64	35	49	0.57%	0.30%	0.40%
Asian alone (NH)	160	299	364	1.43%	2.52%	2.98%
Native Hawaiian or Pacific Islander alone (NH)	8	2	5	0.07%	0.02%	0.04%
Other race alone (NH)	15	34	47	0.13%	0.29%	0.39%
Mixed race or Multiracial (NH)	182	237	577	1.63%	2.00%	4.73%
Hispanic or Latino (any race)	273	902	1,311	2.45%	7.61%	10.74%
Total	11,157	11,849	12,203	100.00%	100.00%	100.00%

=== 2020 census ===
As of the 2020 census, Lakeside had a population of 12,203. The median age was 38.2 years. 20.0% of residents were under the age of 18 and 15.9% of residents were 65 years of age or older. For every 100 females there were 91.4 males, and for every 100 females age 18 and over there were 86.2 males age 18 and over.

100.0% of residents lived in urban areas, while 0.0% lived in rural areas.

There were 5,440 households in Lakeside, of which 25.2% had children under the age of 18 living in them. Of all households, 32.8% were married-couple households, 21.5% were households with a male householder and no spouse or partner present, and 35.5% were households with a female householder and no spouse or partner present. About 35.6% of all households were made up of individuals and 13.3% had someone living alone who was 65 years of age or older.

There were 5,754 housing units, of which 5.5% were vacant. The homeowner vacancy rate was 1.2% and the rental vacancy rate was 3.8%.

Racial composition as of the 2020 census
Race	Number	Percent
White	8,091	66.3%
Black or African American	1,990	16.3%
American Indian and Alaska Native	86	0.7%
Asian	367	3.0%
Native Hawaiian and Other Pacific Islander	5	0.0%
Some other race	689	5.6%
Two or more races	975	8.0%

=== 2000 census ===
As of the 2000 census, there were 11,157 people, 4,982 households, and 2,909 families residing in the CDP. The population density was 2,657.1 people per square mile (1,025.7/km^{2}). There were 5,177 housing units at an average density of 1,232.9/sq mi (475.9/km^{2}). The racial makeup of the CDP was 86.16% White, 8.75% African American, 0.61% Native American, 1.43% Asian, 0.07% Pacific Islander, 1.22% from other races, and 1.76% from two or more races. Hispanic or Latino of any race were 2.45% of the population.

There were 4,982 households, out of which 24.1% had children under the age of 18 living with them, 42.1% were married couples living together, 12.8% had a female householder with no husband present, and 41.6% were non-families. 33.9% of all households were made up of individuals, and 12.0% had someone living alone who was 65 years of age or older. The average household size was 2.19 and the average family size was 2.80.

In the CDP, the population was spread out, with 20.2% under the age of 18, 6.7% from 18 to 24, 34.2% from 25 to 44, 21.3% from 45 to 64, and 17.6% who were 65 years of age or older. The median age was 38 years. For every 100 females, there were 87.3 males. For every 100 females age 18 and over, there were 83.8 males.

The median income for a household in the CDP was $40,641, and the median income for a family was $47,398. Males had a median income of $32,378 versus $27,343 for females. The per capita income for the CDP was $22,242. About 6.2% of families and 8.0% of the population were below the poverty line, including 15.1% of those under age 18 and 4.6% of those age 65 or over.
