= Carytown, Richmond, Virginia =

Retail district in Richmond, Virginia, US

Coordinates: 37°33′7.3″N 77°28′48.8″W

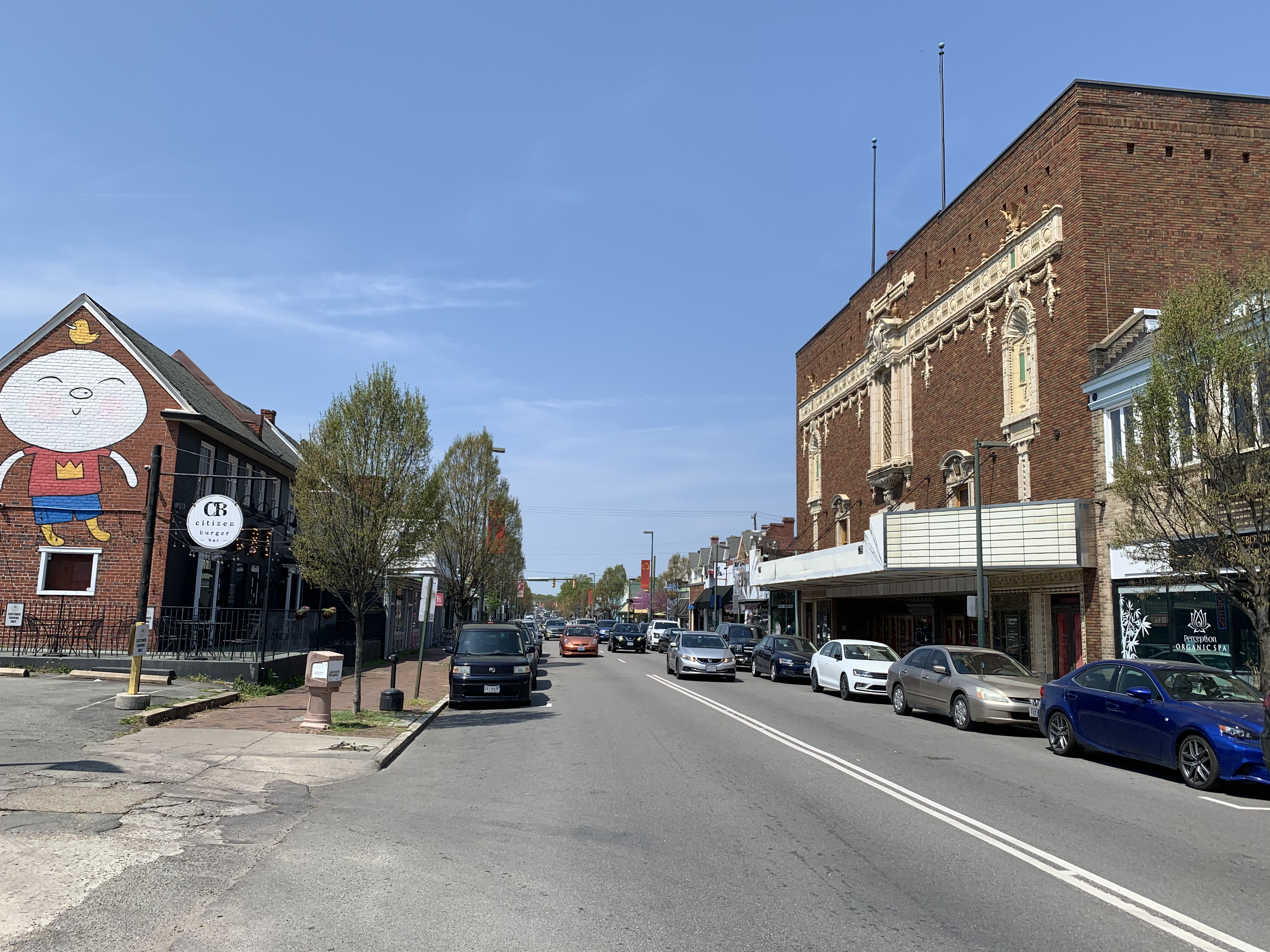
Carytown, seen from West Cary Street, with the Byrd Theatre on the right

Carytown is an urban retail district in Richmond, Virginia; it is along Cary Street at the southern end of the Museum District. Located west of the historic Fan District, Carytown has an eclectic flavor and includes more than 230 shops, restaurants, and offices. The Byrd Theatre, a restored movie palace that has operated continuously since 1928, is located in this district.

== History ==
The Cary Street Park and Shop Center was built in the 1930s and opened for business in 1938. It was Richmond's first strip shopping center, and was popular due to its "park and shop" nature. Since the late 20th century, the area has been redeveloped with more shops, restaurants and offices. An area with space inexpensive enough then for small and new businesses to afford, it became a center for innovative restaurants and a variety of shops. In the 21st century, it attracts both local and regional customers, and tourists. Many shops are located in historic buildings. As with any historic area, the buildings sometimes need repair and restoration.
