= George Floyd protests in Richmond, Virginia =

2020 civil unrest after the murder of George Floyd

- Part of George Floyd protests in Virginia
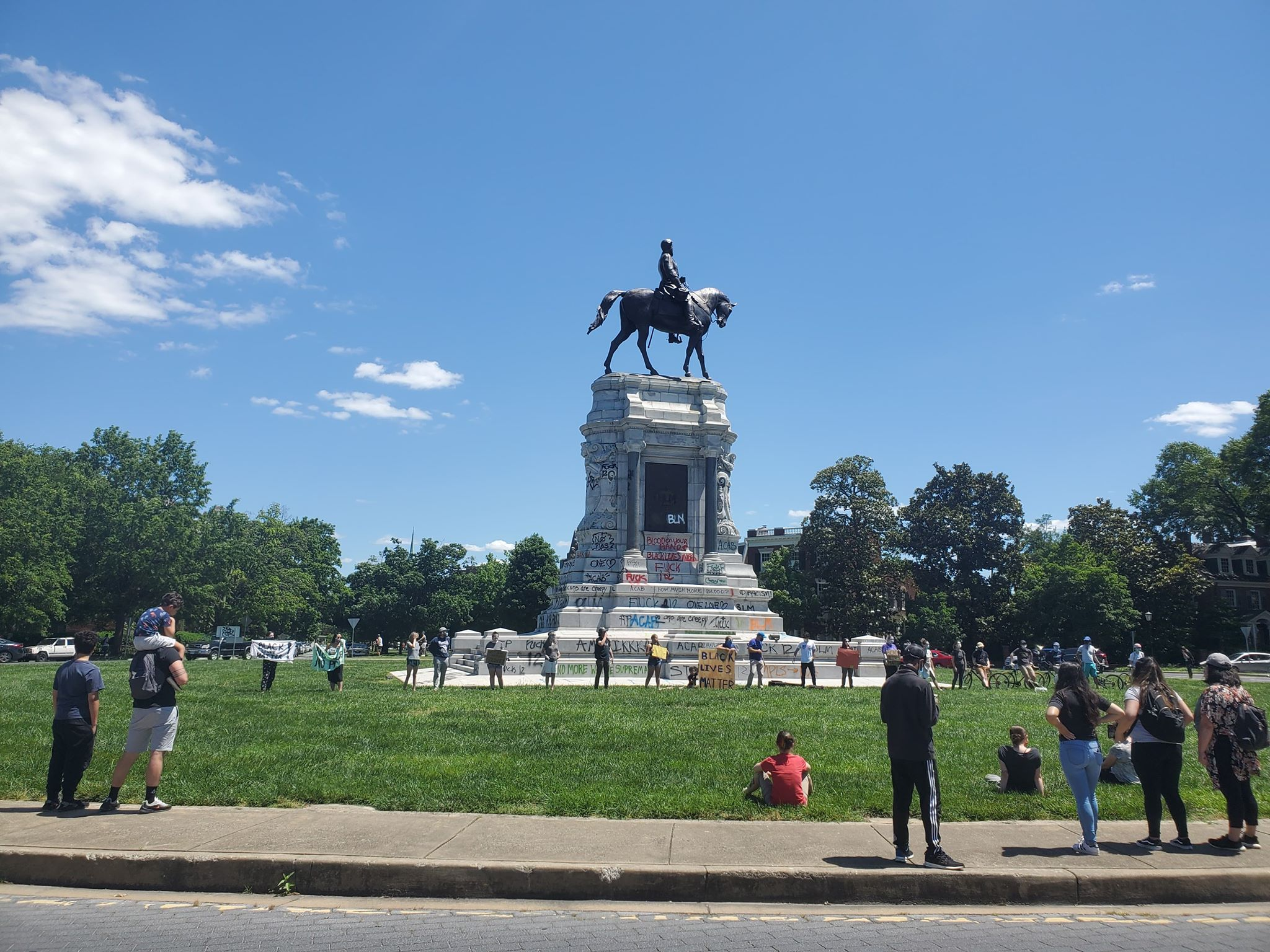
- Black Lives Matter protesters by the graffitied Robert E. Lee Monument on May 31, 2020.
- Date: May 29 – August 16, 2020 (2 months, 2 weeks and 4 days)
- Location: Richmond, Virginia, United States
- Caused by: Murder of George Floyd; White Supremacy; Police brutality in the United States; Confederate monuments
- Goals: Abolition and defunding of the Richmond Police Department; Citizens review board of the Richmond Police Department; Community-controlled policing; Community alerts of police activity; Marcus Alert for social workers to respond to emergencies; Removal of the confederate monuments; Resignation of Levar Stoney as mayor; Resignation of William C. Smith as Richmond Police chief
- Methods: Arson; Civil resistance; Vandalism; Demonstrations; Internet activism; Rioting; Silent protests; Social media activism
- Result: One percent budget cut to the Richmond Police Department for FY22; Initial damage to monuments along Monument Avenue; Removal of the Jackson, Lee, Maury, and Stuart monuments; Removal and relocation of the Richmond Police Memorial; Resignation of William C. Smith as Richmond Police chief; Resignation of Jody Blackwell as Interim Richmond Police chief; Retrofitting of the Lee Circle as a community park named in honor of Marcus-David Peters; Toppling of Columbus, Davis, Howitzer, Sons of Virginia, and Wickham statues; United Daughters of the Confederacy interior burned

Parties
ASH; Black Lives Matter; DSA Richmond; Industrial Workers of the World; Our Revolution RVA; Food Not Bombs; Communist League of Richmond; Richmond Mutual Aid	Government of Richmond, Virginia; Richmond Police; Chesterfield Police; Hanover County Sheriff; Henrico Police; VCU Police; Virginia Capitol Police; Virginia National Guard: Virginia Defense Force; Third Party Affiliations: Monument Avenue Preservation Commission; Oath Keepers; (Confederate States of America) Virginia Flaggers; Confederate Knights of the Ku Klux Klan

Lead figures
	Humberto Cardounel; Mark Herring; David R. Hines; Jeffrey S. Katz; Ralph Northam; Anthony S. Pike; Levar Stoney; William C. Smith; John Venuti

Casualties
- Injuries: At least 25
- Arrested: 400–500

Richmond, Virginia, experienced a series of riots in the wake of the murder of George Floyd. Richmond was the first city in the Southeastern United States to see rioting following Floyd's murder. Richmond, formerly the capital of the short-lived Confederate States of America, saw much arson and vandalism to monuments connected with the Confederacy, particularly along Monument Avenue.

Riots began in late May 2020 and gradually subsided by mid-August 2020. Given the city's Confederate roots, many of the areas of attack by rioters were the statues along Monument Avenue, near The Fan neighborhood of Richmond. During the first wave of Floyd riots, all major monuments (except the Arthur Ashe Monument) were defaced and sprayed with graffiti. Five statues were toppled by rioters. Some of the statues toppled included the Jefferson Davis Memorial, statues of Christopher Columbus and Confederate General Williams Carter Wickham, and the Howitzer Monument.

== Background ==
On May 25, 2020, George Floyd, a 46-year-old black man, was murdered in Minneapolis, Minnesota, during an arrest for allegedly using a counterfeit bill. Derek Chauvin, a white police officer who knelt on Floyd's neck for over nine minutes while Floyd was handcuffed. While Chauvin knelt on Floyd's neck, Floyd was begging for his life and repeatedly saying "I can't breathe". Chauvin was on patrol with three other Minneapolis Police officers: J. Alexander Kueng, Thomas Lane, Tou Thao. Kueng, Lane, and Thao further restrained Floyd, while also preventing bystanders from intervening on the arrest. During the final three minutes Floyd was motionless and had no pulse while Chauvin ignored onlookers' pleas to remove his knee, which he did not do until medics told him to.

The next day, May 26, when videos made by witnesses and security cameras became public, all four officers were fired. Two autopsies found Floyd's death to be a homicide. Initially, Chauvin was charged with third-degree murder and second-degree manslaughter, to which was later added second-degree murder by Minnesota Attorney General, Keith Ellison; the three other officers were charged with aiding and abetting second-degree murder.

Floyd's murder triggered demonstrations and protests in many U.S. cities and around the world against police brutality, income inequality, capitalism, institutional racism, and lack of police accountability. Protests reached the Richmond area about three days after Floyd's murder.

== Demonstrations ==
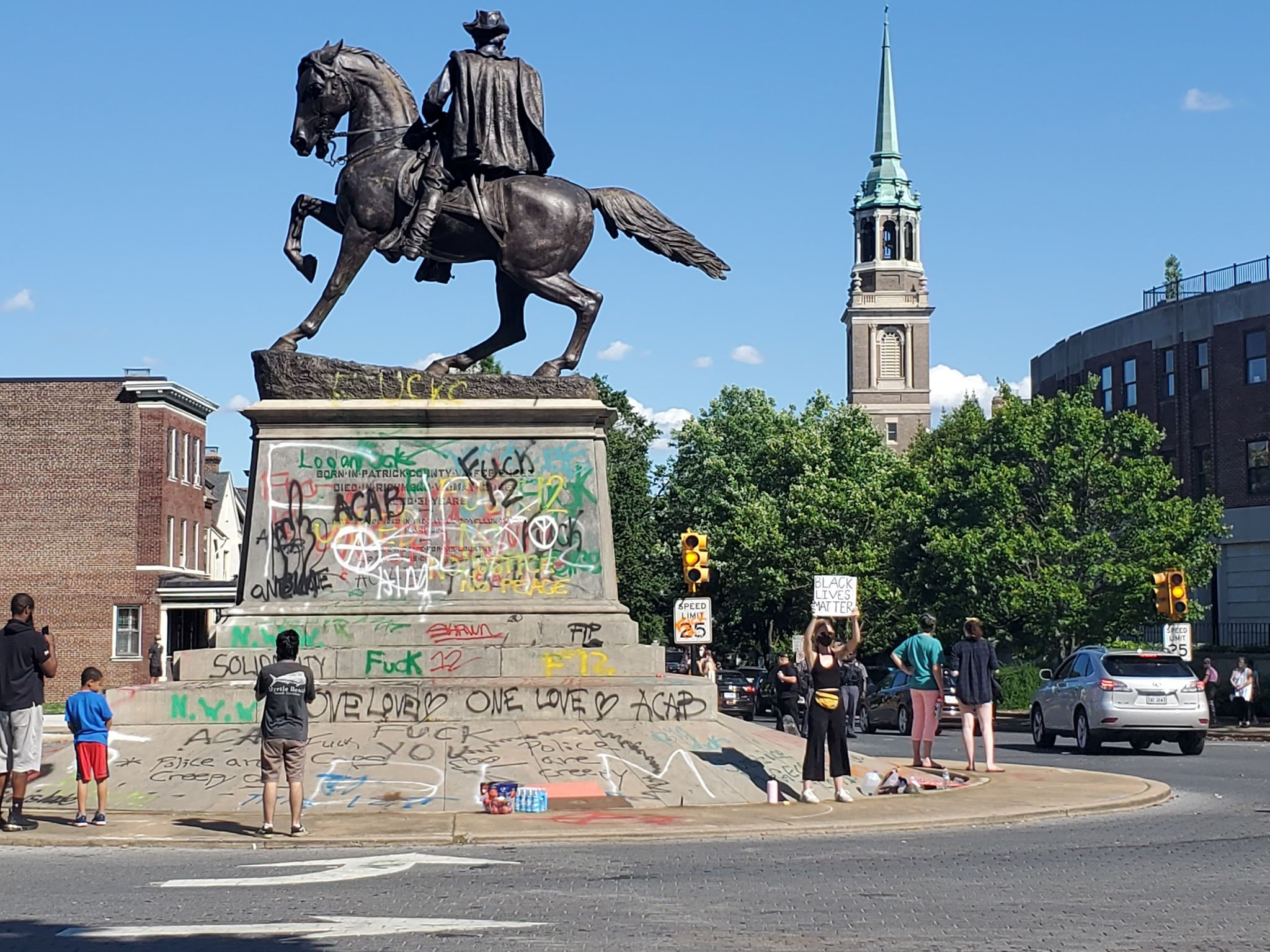
A protester by the vandalized J.E.B. Stuart Monument following protests.

=== May ===
The first organized protest in the city began on the evening of May 29 and went on into the early morning hours of May 30. Protesters organized at Monroe Park and marched down Franklin Street through the Monroe Ward neighborhood. There, they were confronted by the Richmond Police Department (RPD), VCU Police, and the Virginia Division of Capitol Police. Rioters set two police cruisers on fire, both of which were destroyed: one VCU cruiser and one RPD cruiser. Additionally, protesters vandalized a GRTC Pulse rapid transit bus and set it on fire, destroying it.

On the evening of May 30 into the early morning hours of May 31, several hundred protesters organized around the campus of Virginia Commonwealth University and marched down Monument Avenue. The street is well known as being the home of several prominent statues depicting Confederate generals in a positive and honorable light. These statues have, especially in recent years, been subject to vandalism, even prior to the Floyd riots. The first statue defaced was the J.E.B. Stuart Monument located at the intersection of Lombardy Street and Monument Ave. Vandals spray painted the statue and destroyed the fencing around the statue. Subsequently, rioters tagged the Robert E. Lee Monument with various slogans, including "Black Lives Matter", "Lynch Trump", "All Cops Are Bastards", and "Fuck Capitalism". The Jefferson Davis Memorial, and the Stonewall Jackson Monument were also damaged, although none of the statues were toppled.

The interior of the Memorial to the Women of the Confederacy was set on fire. Initially, the Richmond Fire Department reported that just the exterior was damaged. Later on it was noted that the building's interior caught fire, destroying artifacts within the building.

Demonstrators also defaced the sign for the Virginia Museum of History and Culture to re-read "Virginia Museum of Bullshit and Cultists". The Rumors of War sculpture in front of the Virginia Museum of Fine Arts was left unharmed. Damage was also reported at the Whole Foods Market near the Allison Street transit station.

Riots and acts of vandalism went on until 3 or 4:00 a.m. on the morning of May 31. Numerous community members reorganized around the Lee Monument around 10:00 a.m. the next morning, with smaller groups organizing around the Stuart, Jackson, and Davis monuments. The statues along Monument Avenue were further defaced and spray painted. Skateboarders skated on the JEB Stuart monument.

=== June ===
Despite the city-wide curfew, riots continued into the early morning hours of June 1. Approximately 100 to 200 rioters were arrested. Police reports indicated that there was less damage sustained than previous nights. It was reported that several dumpsters, cars, and additional buildings were set on fire.

Throughout the day there were small protests around the Lee and Stuart monuments. Around 5:30 to 6:00 p.m., several hundred protesters gathered near the city's Central Office District blocking streets. Around 7:20 p.m., about forty minutes prior to curfew, Richmond police tear gassed a group of about 500 or 600 protesters that had gathered near the Stuart and Lee monuments. At the time of the tear gassing, the protesters were peaceful and kneeling, while chanting "Why are we here? LOVE!". Drone footage showed the police standing in a diamond formation, with two officers in the center throwing or firing the first tear gas canisters. This posture and formation of officers indicated that this was a premeditated action, and not a response to being separated from their group as initially tweeted by the police department. Later, the RPD tweeted that protesters were attempting to topple the statues. The tear gassing was met with harsh criticism, and the police issued an apology.

On the morning of June 2, Mayor Stoney addressed the press and citizens at Richmond City Hall regarding the police attacks on protesters on June 1. He publicly apologized for the actions of the RPD. Citizens called on Stoney to fire and arrest the police officers involved in the tear gassing, with some calling on Stoney to resign as mayor. Stoney joined protesters in their June 2 march as part of a promise to listen to the concerns and demands of protesters.

Following the news of the statue removal, protests continued throughout the city, and were not attacked. A vigil for Breonna Taylor was held at Maymont Park on June 7, in celebration of what would have been her 27th birthday. Also on June 2, a group of officers were filmed as one of them appeared to repeatedly spit at a woman in handcuffs.

On June 3, an open plaza was set up on the grounds of the Lee Monument to serve as a DIY cultural center.

On the night of June 6, protesters toppled a statue of Williams Carter Wickham, a Confederate general, in Monroe Park. The statue was erected in 1891, and descendants of Wickham had previously urged to remove the statue as early as 2017.

Three days later, on the night of June 9, rioters went to the Christopher Columbus statue in Byrd Park, set it on fire, toppled the statue, and threw it into Fountain Lake on the Byrd Park grounds, making it the second toppled statue in a week in the city. The following evening, on June 10 around 11:00 p.m., rioters tore down the Jefferson Davis statue on Monument Avenue, making it the third statue toppled in the city.

On Saturday, June 13, a march was held on Monument Avenue called the "5,000 Man March." Following this, Mayor Stoney asked the Commonwealth's Attorney for the City of Richmond to investigate the march. The RPD also announced their own internal investigation.

During the early morning hours of June 15, a protest was held outside of the Richmond Police Headquarters against the police brutality exhibited by the RPD over the previous two weeks. Police shot protesters with non-lethal bullets and tear gas. The next day, June 16, Chief William Smith of the Richmond Police resigned at the request of Stoney.

On June 17, a fourth statue was toppled in Richmond, the third Confederate statue. The statue, the Confederate Howitzer Statue, was located on the Monroe Park campus of Virginia Commonwealth University, and was unveiled in 1892. The Howitzer Statue celebrated a Confederate artillery unit. On June 19, various Juneteenth celebrations were held across the region. Around this time, a sign was placed by the Lee Monument proclaiming the area as "Marcus-David Peters Circle", honoring the late Peters, who died while in RPD custody. On June 20, in The Fan neighborhood nearby, protesters tore down the First Virginia Regiment Monument, a statue commemorating Revolutionary War veterans.

On June 22, protesters rallied outside of Richmond City Hall during a City Council meeting, demanding the abolition of the RPD, the creation of a Citizens Review Board with subpoena power, and a "Marcus Alert System", which would send trained social workers to a mental health crisis instead of police. That evening, protesters rallied out of the RPD headquarters in protest against police brutality. They were attacked by the RPD with rubber bullets, tear gas and pepper spray.

On June 26, interim Police Chief Jody Blackwell stepped down. The same day, Levar Stoney announced Deputy Chief Gerald Smith of the Charlotte-Mecklenburg Police Department as the new Chief of the RPD. Smith would begin duties on July 1.

=== July ===
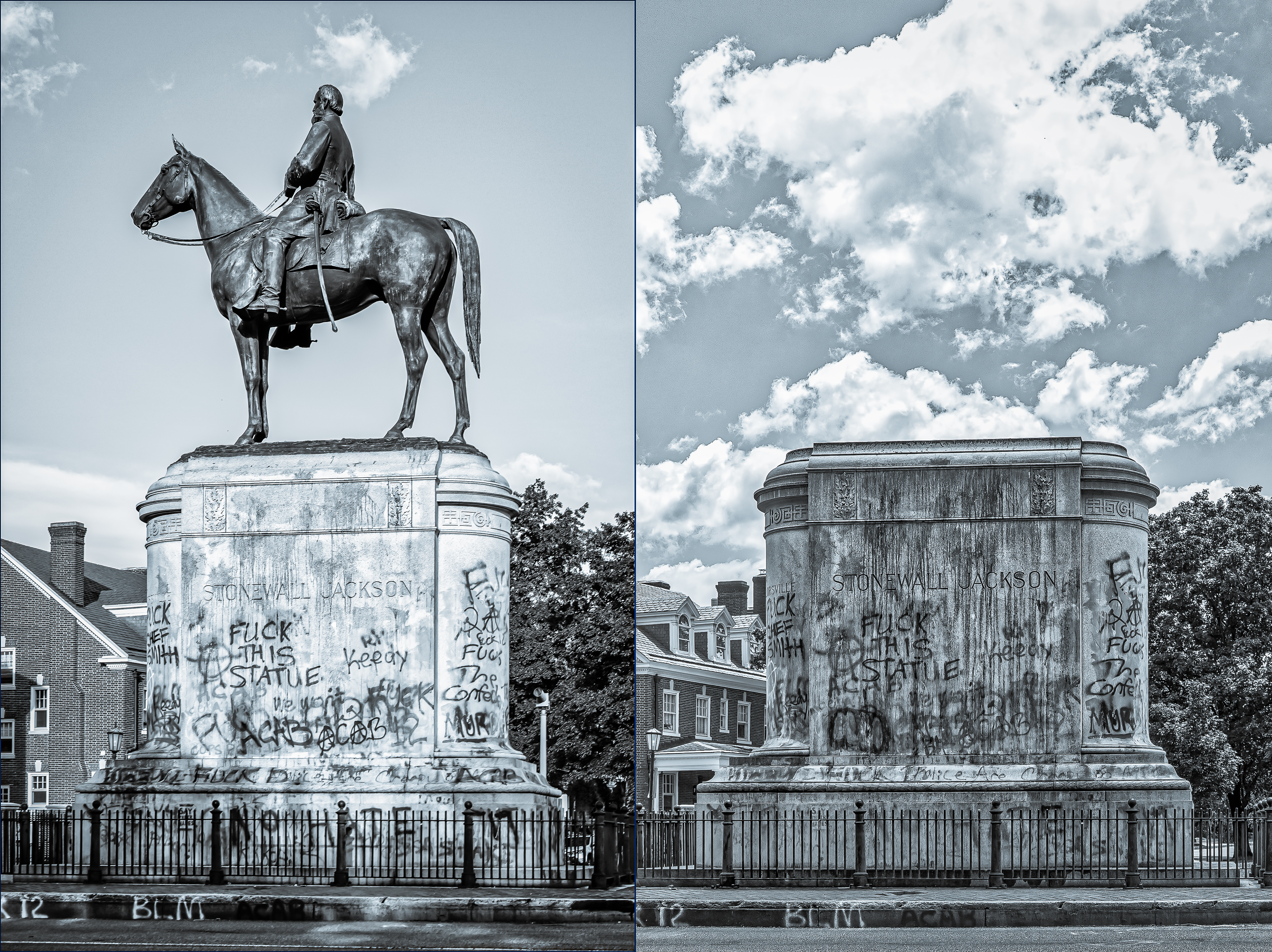
The Stonewall Jackson Monument was partially deconstructed by the city on July 1, 2020

On July 1, construction crews removed the Stonewall Jackson Statue at the corner of Arthur Ashe Boulevard and Monument Avenue, making it the first statue the city government had removed. On July 7, construction crews removed the J.E.B. Stuart Statue at the corner of Monument Avenue and Lombardy Street, making it the second statue the city government had removed.

On July 25, a dump truck was set on fire during a Solidarity with Portland riot in south Richmond. An unlawful assembly was declared at 11 pm. Mayor Stoney and Police Chief Gerald Smith jointly announced that white supremacists had been acting as agents provocateurs, "marching under the banner of Black Lives Matter, an attempt to undermine an otherwise overwhelmingly peaceful movement."

=== August ===
Throughout August, more efforts were made by the Richmond Police Department and the mayor's office to quell the ongoing protests and riots, which had been occurring for nearly two months. On August 7, the Police Department actively disassembled camping area around the Lee Monument site, citing complaints from nearby residents. On August 11, the unofficial historic markers were removed by city officials, and the RPD upped its efforts to prevent overnight camping on the site.

On August 13, the ongoing protests joined with student activist groups at nearby Virginia Commonwealth University to defund or abolish the VCU Police Department. Demands included the release the department's line-item budget for the last five fiscal years, for the university to sever ties with the Richmond Police Department, to redirect all police monies to mental health services, and to actively ban the Immigration and Customs Enforcement (ICE) from entering the campus.

On August 16, the sign marking the name "Marcus-David Peters Circle" was removed, although the RPD denied responsibility.

== Government response ==
On May 31, 2020, Mayor Levar Stoney issued a city-wide curfew from 8:00 p.m. until 6:00 a.m. for non-essential workers in the wake of the ongoing protests. The curfew went into effect on May 31 and was to be lifted on June 3.^{Was it?} Additionally, Virginia governor Ralph Northam issued a state of emergency.

On June 1, 2020, the Richmond, Virginia chapter of Our Revolution called for Stoney and Chief William C. Smith to resign in regards to their handling of the protests.

Several statewide politicians, including Jennifer McClellan and Virginia Attorney General Mark Herring, condemned the use of the Richmond Police's use of tear gas on civilians. A majority of members of the Richmond City Council expressed support for there to be a Citizen's Review Board and Mental Health Alert service for the Richmond Police Department.

On June 3, 2020, Stoney announced his intention to introduce an ordinance to remove the Confederate statues on Monument Avenue. It was announced on June 4, that Governor Ralph Northam will announce plans to remove the Lee monument. That same day a press conference attended by Northam and Stoney confirmed the removal of the monument. Speaking of the removal, Northam said "You see, in Virginia, we no longer preach a false version of history. One that pretends the Civil War was about ‘state rights’ and not the evils of slavery. No one believes that any longer".

On June 5, 2020, all nine members of the Richmond City Council backed the removal of all five Confederate monuments in the city limits. Reva Trammell, who represents the 8th district in the city stated that "while many citizens support putting the Confederate statues in a museum, some oppose it. After giving this much thought, I will vote to take them down. I feel it is the right thing to do. I never thought I would live to see the kind of damage and destruction that has been inflicted on Richmond, and we need to end this now."

On June 16, 2020, Virginia Governor Ralph Northam said he did not support the protesters demands to defund state police, and offered additional reforms instead, which was met with widespread criticism. The following day, the Republican Party of Virginia called for Stoney to resign as the Mayor of Richmond, Virginia. Stoney never responded to the statement.

On June 23, 2020, rapper and Virginia native Trey Songz called for Stoney to resign due to his appointment of Jody Blackwell as interim Police Chief.

On August 3, 2020, a court injunction prevented the removal of the Lee Statue on Monument Ave, allowing the Lee Statue to remain while the other Confederate monuments on the street were removed. On October 27, 2020, part of the injunction was dissolved by a Richmond area judge. On November 12, 2020, Virginia Attorney General, Mark Herring, asked the Supreme Court of Virginia to dissolve the remainder of the injunction. On January 25, 2021, the City of Richmond installed an eight-foot tall chain link barrier fence around the Monument and removed personal items from the circle, in anticipation of the removal of the statue.

In September 2021, the statue of Lee was taken down.

=== Vandalism and removal of Richmond's monuments ===
After the protesting and riots for George Floyd, Stoney's administration left the monuments vandalized or destroyed (such as the statue of Christopher Columbus erected by Richmond's Italian-American community). Acquiescing to the demands of the demonstrators, Stoney and Governor Northam began the process of their removal. The only statue left on Richmond's Monument Avenue is of the African-American tennis player Arthur Ashe.

Following Charlottesville's removal and donation of a Confederate monument to an African-American museum, where plans were to melt it down for reuse, Stoney decided to donate the Confederate statues to Virginia's Black History Museum. The fate of these monuments was decided only days before Republican Glenn Youngkin assumed the office of Governor of Virginia.

=== Election response ===
Levar Stoney was ultimately reelected as mayor, defeating the more progressive challenger, Alexsis Rodgers, and the more centrist challenger, Kim Gray, in a three-way race.

Following the conclusion of Stoney's second term as mayor, Stoney ran for lieutenant governor in 2025, and lost in the Democratic primary in the City of Richmond, Henrico, and Chesterfield counties. Stoney, ultimately finished second in the primary to Ghazala Hashmi, with him losing in the Greater Richmond Region attributed to his loss.
