= George Floyd protests in Virginia =

Protests in Virginia caused by the murder of George Floyd

- Part of George Floyd protests
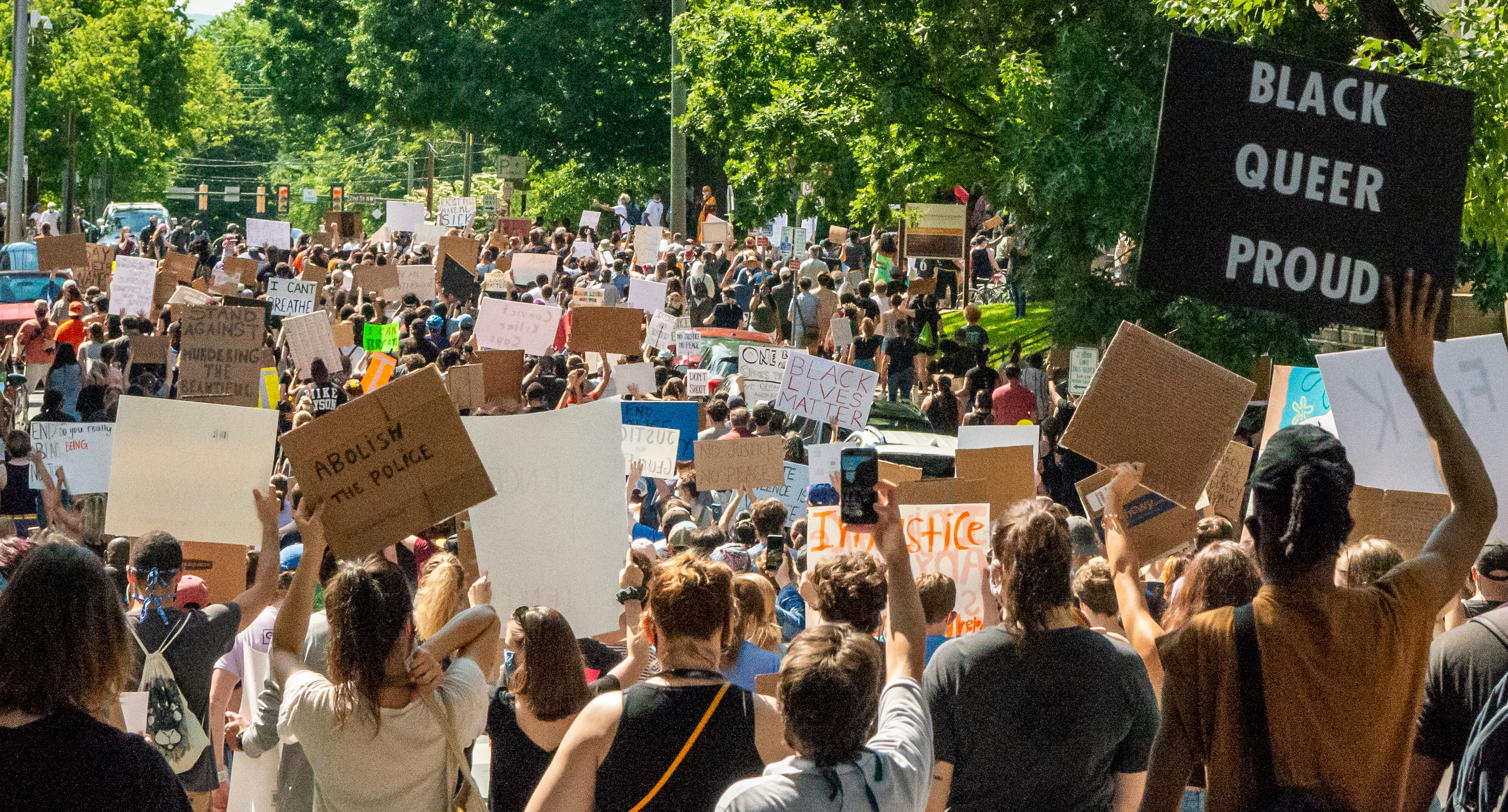
- A George Floyd demonstration in Charlottesville, Virginia, on May 30, 2020
- Date: May 28 – August 16, 2020 (2 months, 2 weeks and 5 days)
- Location: Virginia, United States
- Caused by: Confederate monuments and memorials; Police brutality; Institutional racism against African Americans; Reaction to the murder of George Floyd; Economic, racial and social inequality

Parties
Demonstrator & Protesters	Commonwealth of Virginia; Virginia State Police; Virginia Capitol Police; Virginia National Guard; Virginia Defense Force; Government of Richmond, Virginia; Richmond Police Department; Virginia Commonwealth University; Virginia Commonwealth University Police Department; Counties Law Enforcement; Henrico County, Virginia; Henrico County Police Division; Chesterfield County, Virginia; Chesterfield County Police Department; Hanover County, Virginia; Hanover County Sheriff's Office; United States Government; Federal Bureau of Investigation

Casualties
- Deaths: 1
- Injuries: 150
- Arrested: 500–600

Cities in Virginia in which a protest with about 100 or more participants was held

This is a list of George Floyd protests in Virginia. Following the murder of George Floyd by a police officer, protests spread from Minneapolis to other parts of the United States, including Virginia. Protests broke out in Richmond on the night of May 28 and spread to over 50 other cities over the following days.

== List of protests in Virginia ==
=== Central Virginia ===
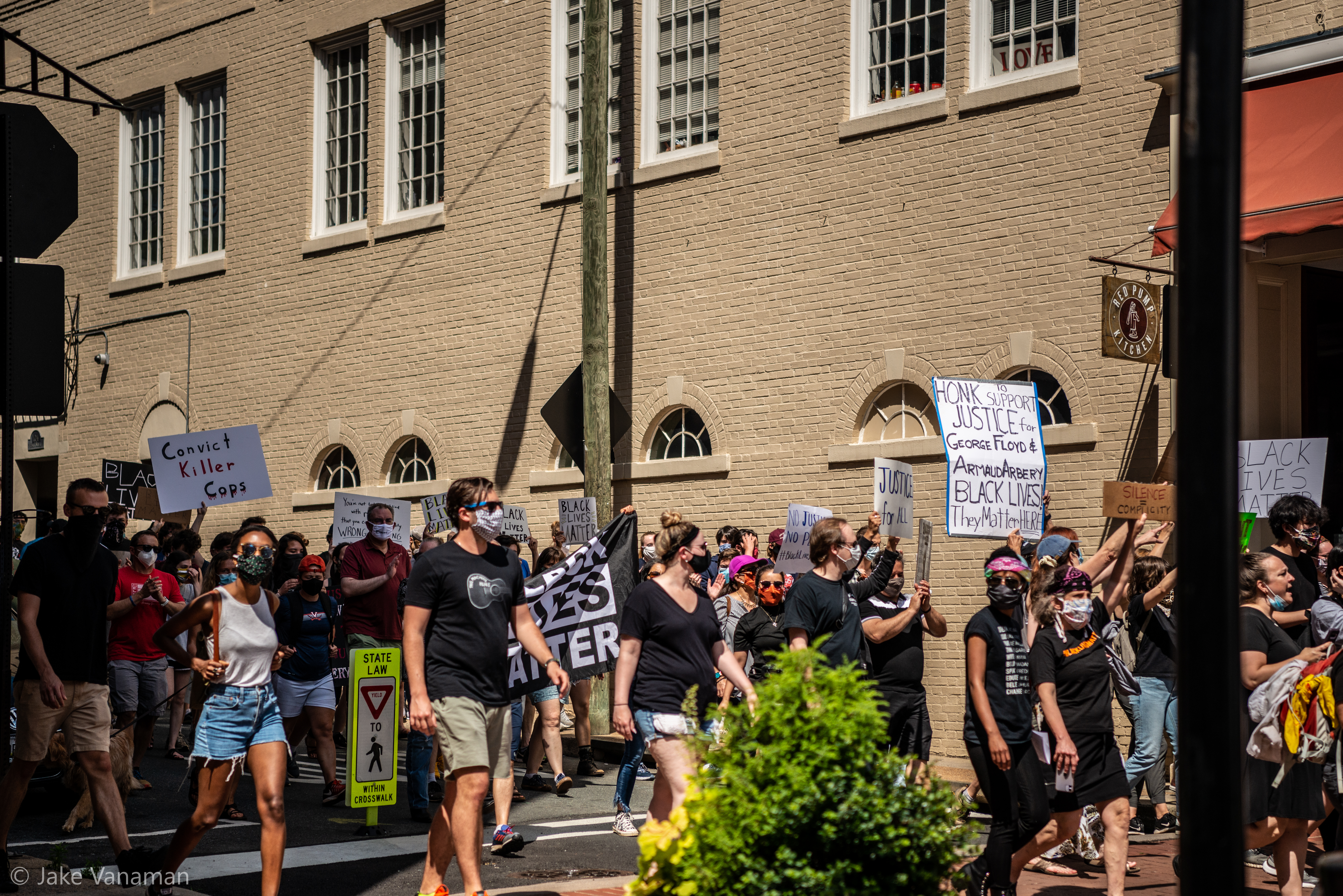
Demonstration in Charlottesville, Virginia on May 30

- Appomattox: On June 4, locals participated in a prayer vigil calling for peaceful unity and healing of racial tensions.
- Ashland: On June 3, demonstrators gathered at the Ashland Town Hall and then marched to the police station.
- Bedford: On June 6, about 100 protesters gathered at Washington Street Baptist Church and marched to the Bedford County Courthouse.
- Bowling Green: On June 7, local pastors organized a prayer rally in front of the Caroline County Courthouse.
- Charlottesville: About 15 people demonstrated with signs on University Avenue on May 29. On Saturday, a large crowd of nearly a thousand flooded the streets near the police station, briefly blocking an intersection during a #JusticeForGeorgeFloyd event.
- Lakeside: On June 7, Harry H. Rogers, a 36-year-old leader of the Ku Klux Klan, drove a truck into a group of protesters, injuring at least one. Rogers was arrested, charged with "attempted malicious wounding, felony vandalism, and assault and battery", and was held without bond. In 2021, he was sentenced to 44 months in prison.
- Lawrenceville: On June 2, about 125 protesters marched from Saint Paul's College to Courthouse Square.
- Lynchburg: About 100 people gathered for a Black Lives Matter protest outside the Lynchburg Community Market on May 30. On June 1, two Lynchburg officers were hospitalized after being assaulted by a crowd of rioters that evening.
- Richmond:

=== Shenandoah Valley ===
- Covington: On June 5, protesters gathered in downtown Covington.
- Front Royal: On June 5, approximately 1,200 protesters gathered at Bing Crosby Stadium. The organizers claimed that it was the largest protest to ever happen in Front Royal.
- Harrisonburg: On May 29, over 300 people gathered to protest in Court Square. The protesters broke out into chants, and at one point knelt like Colin Kaepernick's police brutality protests. There was a rally in Court Square Friday, May 28, with a follow-up rally scheduled for Friday June 5 at 5:30 with a prayer and rally at 6:00. There was a silent march on Monday June 1 at 6:00 that drew over 1,000 protesters calling for an end to police brutality and systemic racism. The March began at Liberty Park and proceeded down Liberty St. before turning onto Main St. and returning to Liberty Park without incident other than a woman attempting to drive through the protesters as they crossed an intersection. She was stopped. No one was injured, and the march proceeded without even slowing down.
- Lexington: On June 3, a protest in downtown Lexington drew hundreds of participants.
- Orange: On June 4, hundred of protesters marched along Madison Road from the Orange Village Shopping Center to the Courthouse on Main Street.
- Staunton: On May 30, about 150 protesters marched to the Augusta County Courthouse where a "Justice for George Floyd" rally was held. Speakers included the granddaughter of a KKK member.
- Waynesboro: On June 3, about 150 protesters gathered outside of the Thomas Gorsuch Municipal Building.

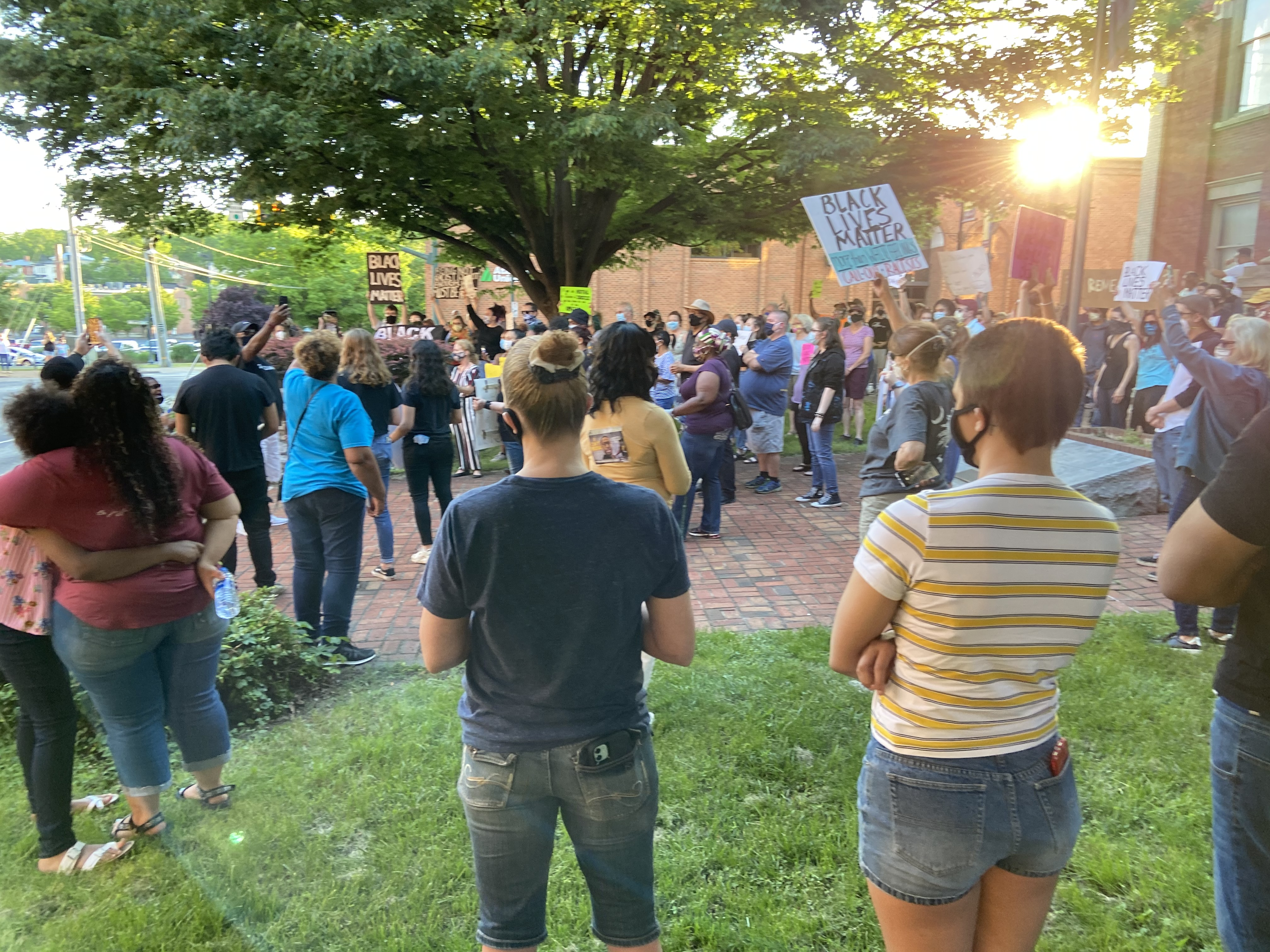
A protest in Staunton, on May 30

- Winchester: On May 31, peaceful protests were being held in Winchester that marched through the streets, ending in a scene at Picadilly Circle. Protesters were chanting "I Can't Breathe" while marching through the streets, and finally with "Black Lives Matter" while at the end point of Picadilly. Police were seen directing traffic around and away from the protesters in an attempt to keep the public safe.

=== Southwest Virginia ===
- Abingdon: On June 6, participants gathered for a peace vigil at the Appalachian Peace Education Center in Abingdon.
- Blacksburg: About 300 people peacefully demonstrated on Main Street on June 1.
- Bristol: On June 1, about 200 people held a candlelight vigil for George Floyd on State Street in both Bristol, Virginia and Bristol, Tennessee. The protests were largely peaceful and held across the Tri-Cities region of Southwest Virginia and East Tennessee.
- Danville: On June 1, dozens of protesters marched up and down Main Street in Danville.
- Galax: On June 3, approximately 70 protesters gathered at Felts Park and marched to the Galax Police Department courtyard.
- Marion: On June 13, protesters were met with counter-protesters outside the Smyth County Courthouse. Hours later a burning cross was placed in the yard of the 17-year-old organizer of the rally.
- Martinsville: On May 31, approximately 100 people gathered to protest in Martinsville. On June 1, another crowd of protesters gathered in a Walgreens parking lot.
- Norton: On June 1, dozens of participants gathered to protest the murder of George Floyd.
- Roanoke: About 100 people protested in Downtown Roanoke on May 30. At least one person was arrested.
- Rocky Mount: On June 3, about 50 protesters gathered in front of the Franklin County courthouse. Two police officers who danced the electric slide with BLM protesters were later arrested for taking part in the 2021 storming of the United States Capitol.
- Wytheville: On June 2, approximately 300 protesters marched from Al Jennings Field at Wytheville Community College to Withers Park.

=== Northern Virginia ===
- Alexandria: In the wake of the protests, the city removed the Appomattox statue on June 2, one of the last remaining statues in the city honoring soldiers who fought for the Confederate States. The statue had originally been planned to be removed in July 2020, but the statue's owners, the United Daughters of the Confederacy, opted to remove it sooner. The same day, a vigil for George Floyd was held.
- Arlington: Given the county's proximity to Washington, D.C., most of the protests focused on George Floyd were in Washington, D.C. The Arlington County Police Department had been assisting the D.C. Metro Police, the U.S. Capitol Police, the Secret Service, the U.S. Park Police, and Metro Transit Police with the protests in Washington, but were pulled by the state following the Trump bible controversy. On June 4, hundreds of protesters gathered in Court House and marched to Clarendon.
- Burke: Protesters held a rally at the intersection of Burke Centre Parkway and Roberts Road on June 5.
- Clifton: In June, the city government raised a banner reading "Welcome to Clifton where Black Lives Matter" over Main Street. The banner prompted outrage from some people in nearby towns, including Ginni Thomas, who is the wife of the only black justice on the U.S. Supreme Court.
- Culpeper: A peaceful protest with between 700 and 800 participants took place on June 6.
- Dumfries: On June 5, about 75 protesters in Dumfries marched onto Interstate 95, briefly shutting it down. Nearly 50 arrests were made.
- Fairfax City: On June 6, over 3,000 protesters in Fairfax gathered in the city's old town square in support of Black Lives Matter. It was organized by Fairfax High School students.
- Falls Church: On June 4, hundreds of protesters marched down Park Avenue in Falls Church.
- Fredericksburg: Several hundred protesters marched in Downtown Fredericksburg and near the Central Park Mall on May 30.
- Leesburg: On May 31, nearly 1,500 people attended protests in Downtown Leesburg; the protests were largely peaceful. Leesburg Town Council member Ron Campbell, the only African-American on Town Council, addressed the crowd.

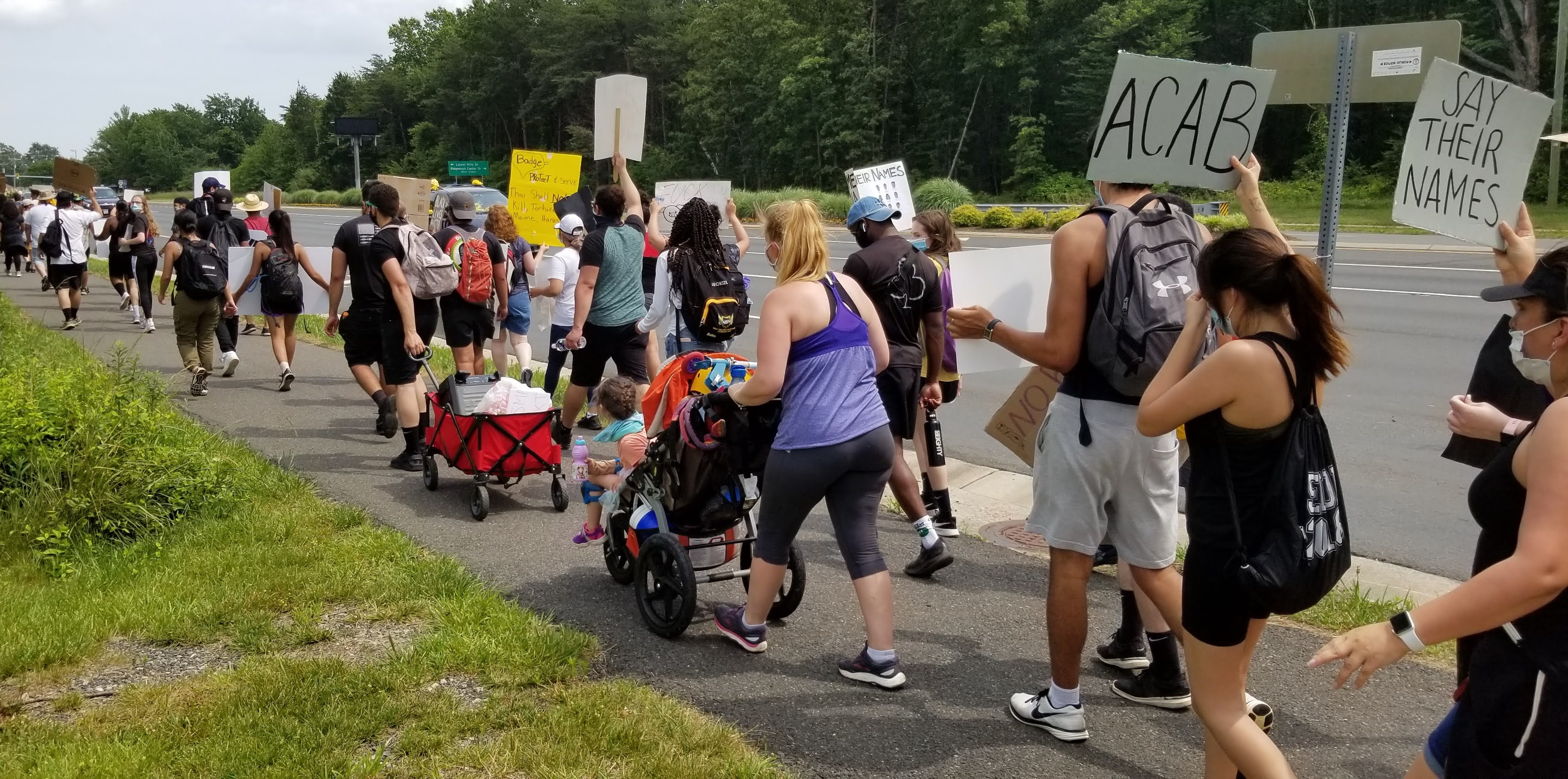
A protest march in Manassas, on June 6

- Manassas: On May 30, several hundred protesters gathered around the area of Sudley Road and Sudley Manor Drive. State and local police arrived and shortly thereafter declared the gathering an unlawful assembly. Up to two officers received minor injuries. State Delegate Lee J. Carter, who represents part of the area in the Virginia's House of Delegates, attended the protest. Delegate Carter was hit with pepper spray and multiple flashbang grenades after identifying himself to the police.
- Stafford: A rally was held in the parking lot of the Stafford Marketplace on May 31. Stafford School Board member Emily Young addressed the crowd.
- Sterling: On June 6, thousands of protesters gathered at Algonkian Regional Park.
- Vienna: On June 3, hundreds of protesters gathered on Chain Bridge Road in Vienna for two separate protests, one designated for people at-risk or who had concerns about coronavirus, and a second protest later in the day for those who were less concerned, but they were also encouraged to wear face masks and take proper precautions for the virus. The protests remained peaceful and the Vienna Chief of Police attended both rallies.
- Warrenton: Peaceful protests were carried out in Warrenton on May 30 and 31.

=== Eastern Shore ===
- Accomac: On June 6, hundreds of protesters gathered in front of the courthouse and marched to the library.
- Chincoteague: On June 3, protesters gathered in Donald J. Leonard Park.
- Exmore: On June 6, approximately 150 protesters gathered in a local park.

=== Tidewater Region ===
- Chesapeake: On June 5, hundreds of protesters marched around City Park, where a moment of silence was held for eight minutes and forty-six seconds, and along Greenbrier Parkway to support Black Lives Matter.
- Hampton: On May 29, a standoff between police and protesters on West Mercury Boulevard ended with four arrests. Hundreds of protesters took over major roads and bridges in the area on May 31 for the third day of protests.
- Norfolk: On June 2, more than 100 protesters marched from Granby Street to the Confederate monument on Main Street.
- Petersburg: On May 30, approximately 30 protesters gathered near East Bank Street and Second Street.
- Poquoson: On June 5, protesters gathered in front of the Poquoson Police Department.
- Suffolk: On June 1, more than 140 protesters gathered at a north Suffolk shopping center.
- Virginia Beach: On May 31, a protest in Virginia Beach started out peacefully, but ended in violence and vandalism as protesters smashed windows and looted shops on the Virginia Beach Oceanfront. At least 48 businesses sustained around $300,000 worth of damage. Police sprayed tear gas on protesters and made 19 arrests. On June 1, a protest in Town Center was peaceful, with no injuries or property damage being reported, although 26 more arrests were made by police. On June 2, a rally and prayer vigil organized by Virginia Beach Interdenominational Ministers Conference was held at Mount Trashmore Park. On June 5, 75 protesters marched north on Interstate 95, stopping all traffic. Protesters resisted orders from police in the Express Lanes to move out of traffic due to being an unlawful assembly, but dispersed once officers started making arrests.
- Williamsburg: On May 31, hundreds of protesters gathered at the Williamsburg-James City County courthouse.

== See also ==
- George Floyd protests in Maryland
- George Floyd protests in Washington, D.C.
- List of George Floyd protests in the United States
- List of George Floyd protests outside the United States
