= Carillon Neighborhood Historic District =

Historic district in Virginia, United States

- U.S. National Register of Historic Places
- U.S. Historic district
- Virginia Landmarks Register
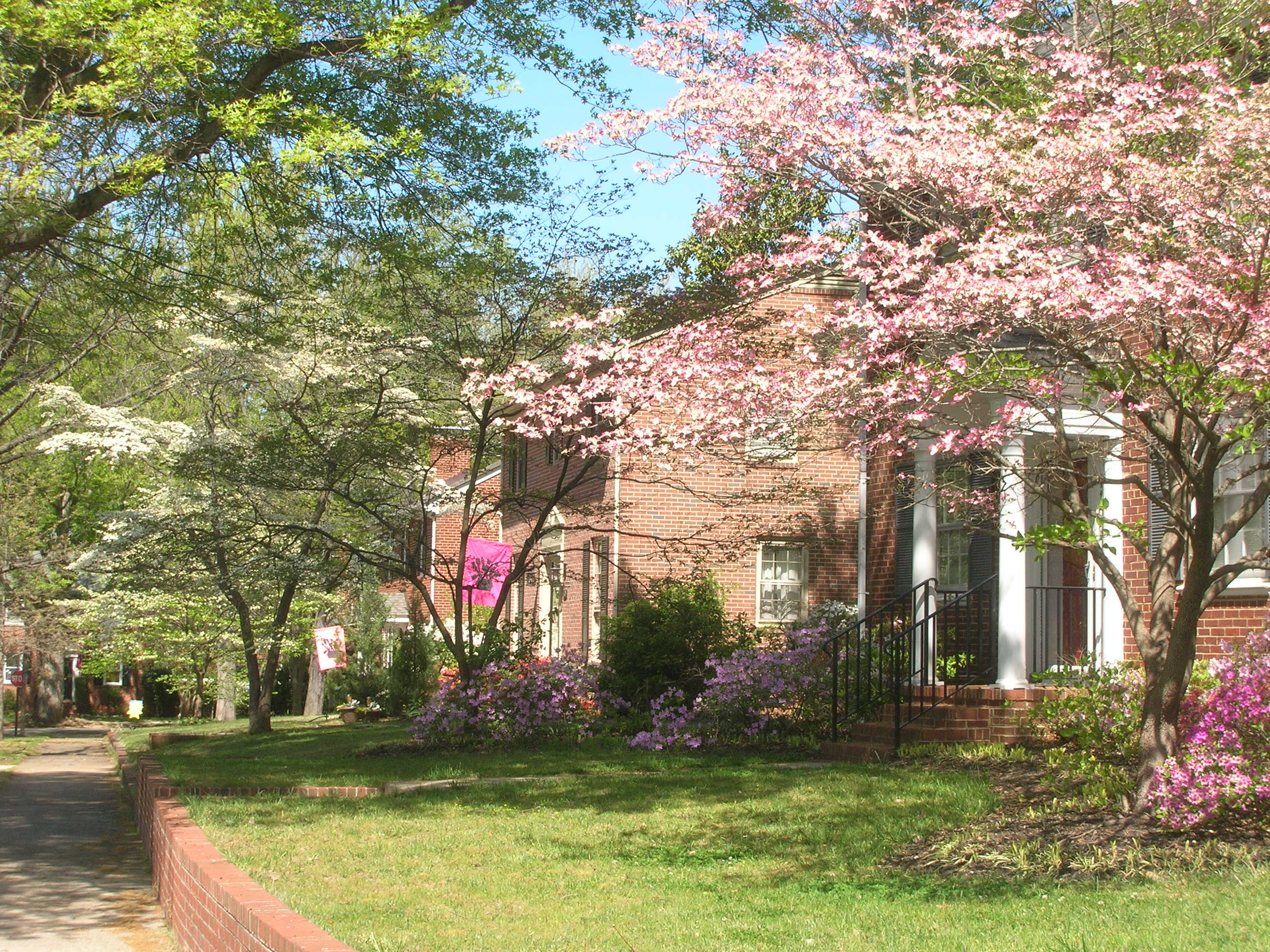

- Location within Virginia Location within the United States
- Location: Belmont, Blanton, Maplewood, Rendale & Sunset Aves., Carrolton, Condie, French, Garrett, Rueger & Sheppard Sts., Richmond, Virginia
- Coordinates: 37°32′37″N 77°29′04″W
- Area: 57 acres (23 ha)
- NRHP reference No.: 15001045
- VLR No.: 127-6756

Significant dates
- Added to NRHP: February 2, 2016
- Designated VLR: December 10, 2015

The Carillon Neighborhood Historic District encompasses a residential area of western Richmond, Virginia, USA. It is located about 3 miles (4.8 km) west of downtown Richmond, and is roughly bounded on the north and west by the Powhite Expressway and the Downtown Expressway, on the south by the Kanawha Canal, and on the east by Byrd Park. Although this area has a residential history dating back to the 19th century (when it was mainly country estates), its present architecture is reflective of its development first as a streetcar suburb, and then as a post-World War II housing development area.

The district was listed on the National Register of Historic Places in 2016.

== See also ==
- National Register of Historic Places listings in Richmond, Virginia
