= Richmond Police Department =

Richmond Police Department may refer to:

- Richmond Police Department (California), in Richmond, California, US
- Richmond Police Department (Virginia), in Richmond, Virginia, US
