= Criminal Alien Gang Member Removal Act =

United States criminal law

The Criminal Alien Gang Member Removal Act is legislation, introduced by Congresswoman Barbara Comstock (R-Va.), U.S. House Judiciary Committee Chairman Bob Goodlatte (R-Va.), Congressman Peter King (R-N.Y.), and Congressman Raúl Labrador (R-Idaho), that was passed by the U.S. House of Representatives during the 115th United States Congress to make it easier to deny admission to, or deport, aliens suspected of gang activity.

According to the Donald Trump administration, "This bill provides law enforcement with the tools they need to improve domestic security and restore public safety by denying criminal alien gang members admission to the United States." Barbara Comstock stated, "The Criminal Alien Gang Member Removal Act will give important tools to law enforcement like the Northern Virginia Regional Gang Task Force so that they can effectively do their jobs to deport alien gang members." She said, "It will ensure that when ICE positively identifies a known alien gang member, they may act immediately. We don't have to wait until these brutal killers wield their machetes or leave another body on a children's playground."

Comstock has said that she introduced the bill to target criminal gangs like MS-13.

== Criticism ==
Congressional Democrats argued, "Under this bill, immigrants could be denied admission with little due process based on no real evidence of a gang affiliation. The "reason to believe" standard is a low burden of proof similar to probable cause, and it does not require a conviction or even an arrest. This would allow the government to deny admission based on flimsy, circumstantial evidence." They also argued that the legislation would ensnare former gang members who have ended their involvement in criminal activity.

Immigrant rights activist Michael Kagan argued that the Bill would harm young victims, children who had been forced to join gangs under threat of violence.
