= Byrd Park Court Historic District =

Historic district in Virginia, United States

- U.S. National Register of Historic Places
- U.S. Historic district
- Virginia Landmarks Register
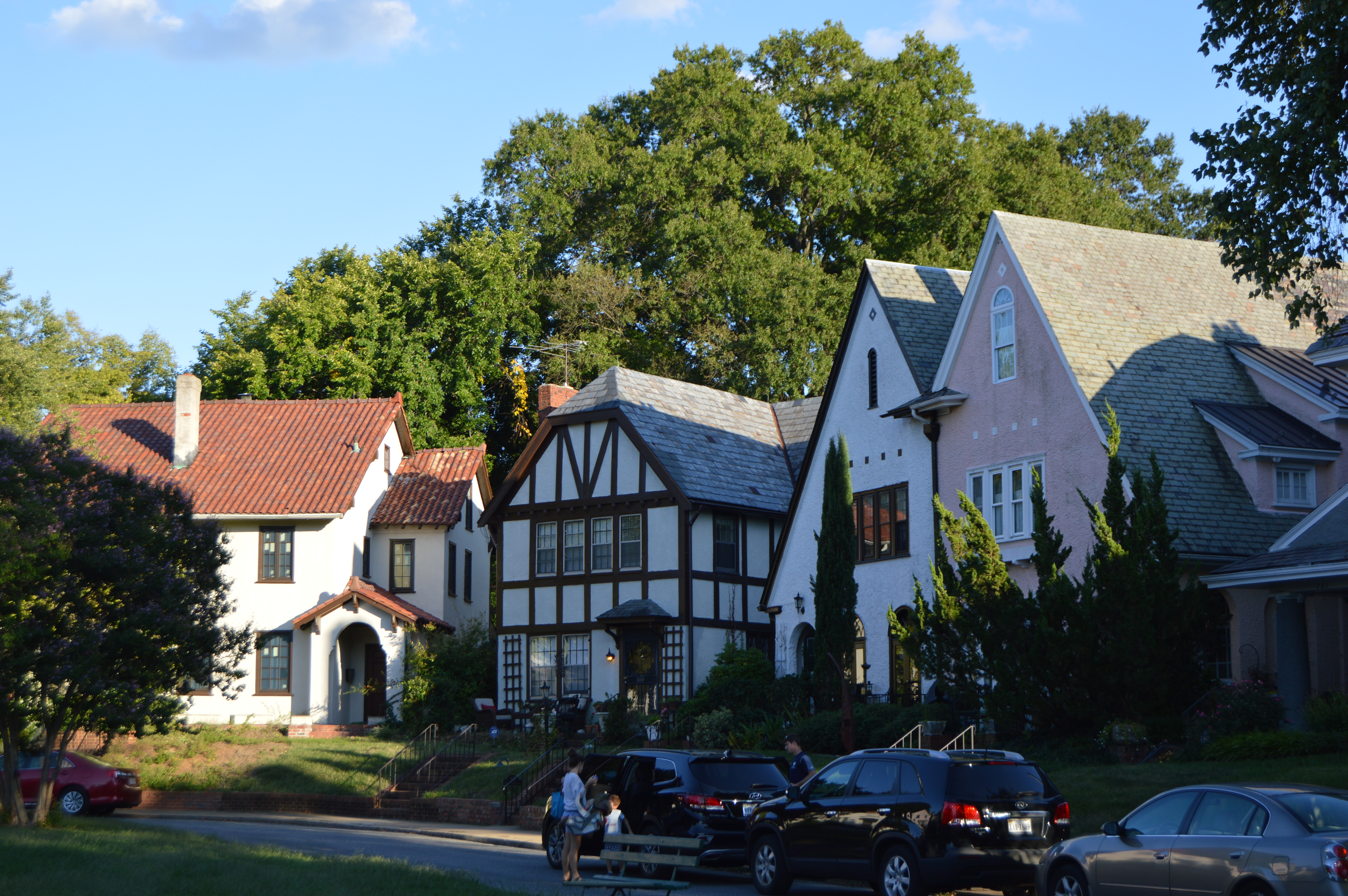
- Southern side

- Location within Virginia Location within the United States
- Location: 701, 703, 735 Lake Rd., 705-733 Byrd Park Ct.
- Coordinates: 37°32′37″N 77°28′17″W
- Area: 3.2 acres (1.3 ha)
- NRHP reference No.: 15001043
- VLR No.: 127-6755

Significant dates
- Added to NRHP: February 2, 2016
- Designated VLR: December 10, 2015

The Byrd Park Court Historic District encompasses a small, well-preserved residential subdivision in western Richmond, Virginia. Located just east of William Byrd Park, nearly opposite the Swan Lake Drive entrance, stands Byrd Park Court, a loop road on which are set six duplexes and six single-family houses. A stone gate flanks the entrance, and the center of the loop has a grassy area with a water fountain. The houses were built in the 1920s, in a variety of period revival styles with Craftsman touches.

The district was added to the National Register of Historic Places in 2016.

== See also ==
- National Register of Historic Places listings in Richmond, Virginia
