= Richmond City Council =

Richmond City Council may refer to:

- Richmond City Council (British Columbia), Canada
- Richmond City Council (California), United States
- Richmond City Council (Virginia), United States
