= Richmond Police Memorial =

Statue in Richmond, Virginia, U.S.

- Location: Richmond, Virginia
- Coordinates: 37°32′34.23″N 77°28′46.44″W
- Designer: Maria Kirby-Smith
- Type: Memorial
- Completion date: 1987
- Dedicated to: Officers killed in the line of duty

The Richmond Police Memorial is a statue previously located in Richmond, Virginia's Byrd Park, sculpted by Maria Kirby-Smith. The statue depicts a police officer holding a young girl, and a nearby plaque lists the names of 39 Richmond police officers killed in the line of duty between 1863 and 2003.

== History ==
The statue was originally erected in Nina F. Abady Park in 1987, funded by the private Police Memorial Fund. The statue remained in this location, surrounded by overgrown shrubbery, until it was moved to Byrd Park in 2016. The move was spearheaded by retired patrolman Glenwood W. Burley, and cost roughly $24,000. The plaque was updated from 28 names to 39, to account for 11 officers that died in the 1870 collapse of the Virginia State Capitol.

== Vandalism and removal ==
Prior to its re-dedication that October, the statue was vandalized with spraypaint reading "Justice for Alton." During the 2020 George Floyd protests, the statue was again vandalized, and was moved to an undisclosed location to avoid further damage.
