= Northern Virginia Regional Gang Task Force =

The Northern Virginia Regional Gang Task Force is a multi-jurisdictional partnership of mostly local police forces to address gang activity in Northern Virginia through enforcement, prevention, and intervention. Funded by a small Congressional appropriation, its goal is to make the region inhospitable to gang activity.

== Composition ==
The task force's board of directors is composed of the chief law enforcement officers from 15 municipalities and the Virginia State Police.

- Arlington County
- Alexandria
- Dumfries
- City of Fairfax
- Fairfax County
- Falls Church
- Fauquier County
- Herndon
- Leesburg
- Loudoun County
- Manassas
- Manassas Park
- Prince William County
- Vienna
- Warrenton
- Virginia State Police

== Overview ==
The task force was set up in July 2003 by Congressman Frank Wolf. As chairman of the subcommittee that controls the U.S. Department of Justice's budget, he was able to dedicate federal funds directly to that group. In July 2004, the task force expanded to cover all of northern Virginia, and in July 2006 it expanded to cover Fauquier and the town of Warrenton. In 2012, the task force's budget was reduced from $3 million to $325,000, and it was never restored to its former level. In 2017, Congresswoman Barbara Comstock sent a letter to Attorney General Jeff Sessions, asking that $1.92 million be granted to the Northern Virginia Regional Gang Task Force. She noted that both Fairfax and Prince William counties had seen increases in homicides recently, with the task force investigating 14 of them.

In 2018, the task force said taking down MS-13 was its top priority. Jay Lanham, director of the task force, said that although New York gets more attention, northern Virginia is an east coast MS-13 hub, with the second largest population of MS-13 next to Los Angeles in the United States. He also said the capital region only had maybe one or two less MS-13 murders than Suffolk County, Long Island.

One criticism of the task force was that it overlapped with similar task forces and did not add any additional detectives. One tactic used by the task force is to partner with Immigration and Customs Enforcement to arrest individuals for being in the country illegally.
