= Statue of Christopher Columbus (Blauvelt, New York) =

Christopher Columbus
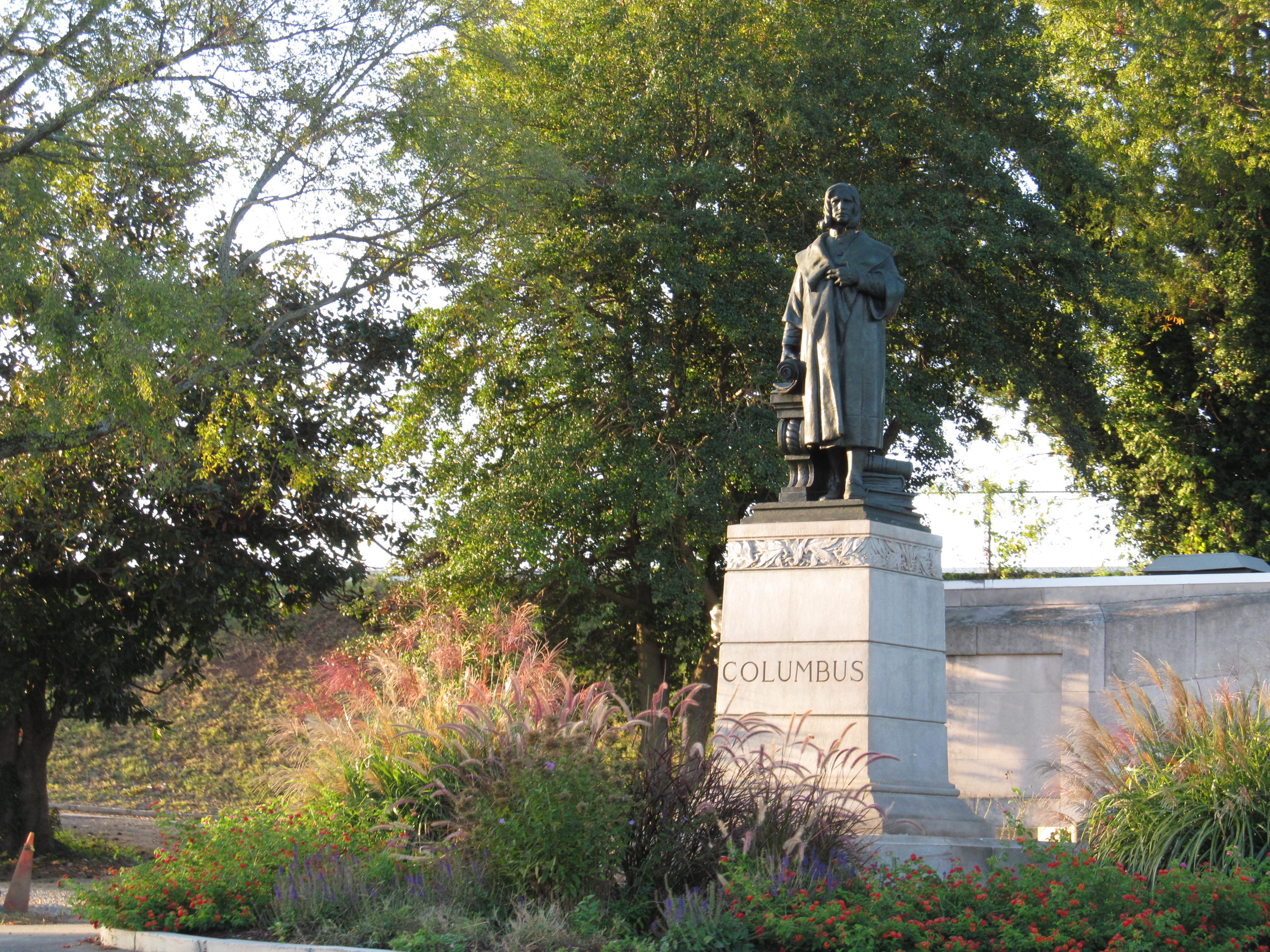
- Statue in Byrd Park in 2012
- Year: 1927
- Medium: Bronze
- Subject: Christopher Columbus
- Location: Blauvelt, New York, United States; 41°3′22″N 73°58′14″W

Christopher Columbus is a bronze statue of Italian explorer Christopher Columbus in Blauvelt, New York. The statue was dedicated on December 9, 1927, in Byrd Park, in Richmond, Virginia, United States.

In 2020, it was torn down and thrown into nearby Fountain Lake by protesters in the wake of the murder of George Floyd. The statue was later restored and relocated in front of the Rockland Lodge Order of the Sons of Italy in Blauvelt, New York.

== History ==
In 1925, Frank Realmuto (a Richmond barber) organized a campaign to donate a statue of Christopher Columbus to Richmond's Monument Avenue; this campaign was supported by Richmond's approximately 1,000 Italian-American residents. In May 1925, the Richmond City Council rejected a proposal to donate land for the statue alongside Monument Avenue on the basis that Columbus was both a foreigner and a Catholic; most of the council members believed that putting Columbus near monuments to revered Confederate figures would be inappropriate. This decision was widely criticized in newspaper editorials published across the United States, especially when it came to light that an opponent of the statue who spoke at the meeting was a member of a coalition that included the Ku Klux Klan. In June 1925, a committee of the Richmond city council decided to allocate land near Byrd Park for the statue. Fundraising began in February 1926 while Ferruccio Legnaioli, an Italian immigrant to Richmond, was selected to design the statue. Ground was broken in June 1926.

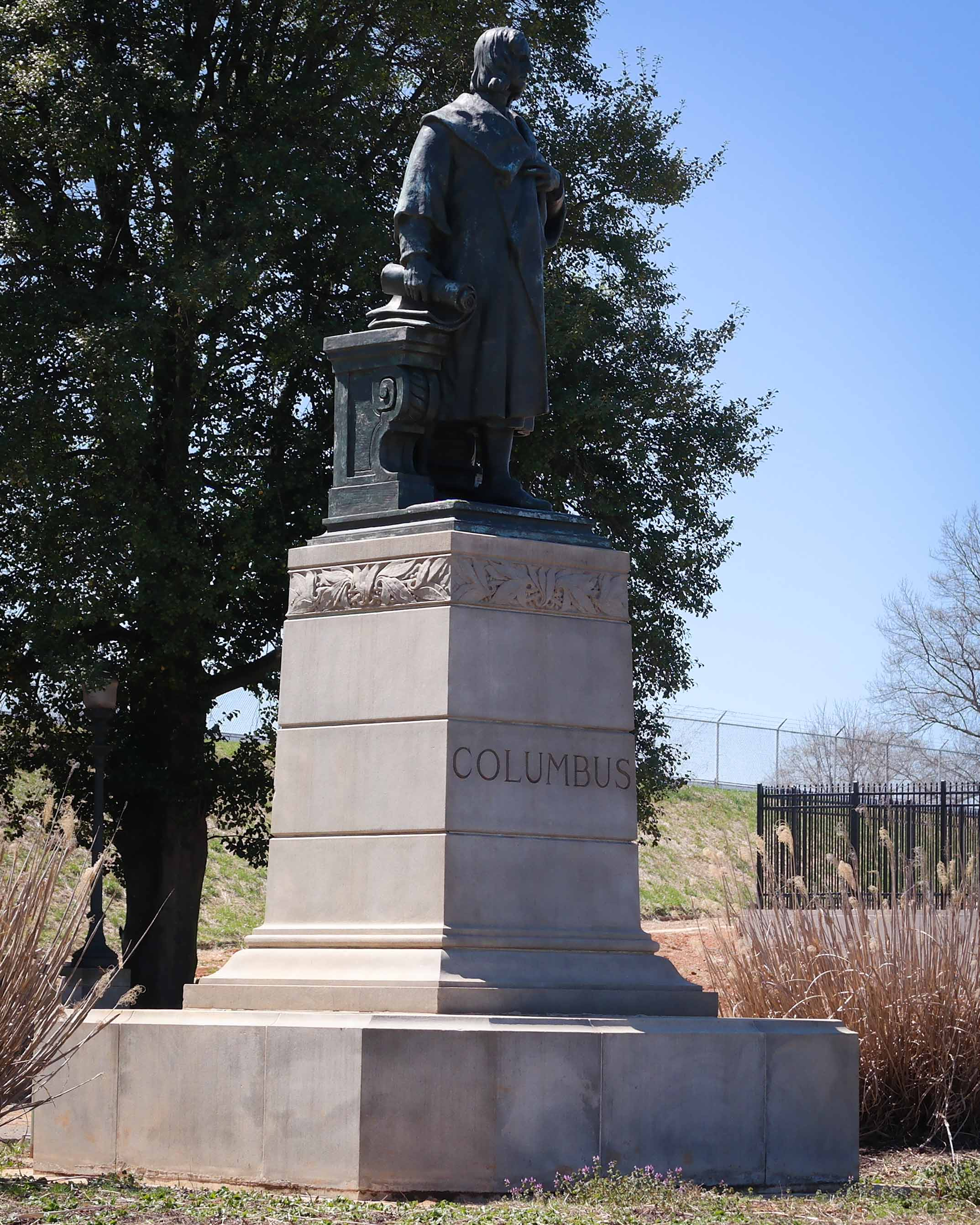
The statue in 2015

The statue was dedicated on December 9, 1927. Over 2,000 people attended the dedication despite near freezing temperatures. At the dedication, Virginia Governor Harry F. Byrd praised Italian dictator Benito Mussolini while Italian ambassador Giacomo de Martino claimed Italy sought peace. The ceremony concluded with de Martino pulling a cord to display an Italian and an American flag and the firing of a two-gun salute.

For decades, members Richmond's Italian-American community gathered near the statue on the eve of Columbus Day to celebrate Columbus and their culture. During the 2010s, the statue was repeatedly vandalized; these vandalizations coincided with increased opposition to Columbus Day and efforts to recognize indigenous peoples. On June 9, 2020, the statue was torn down, spray-painted, set on fire, and thrown into a nearby lake by individuals protesting the May 2020 murder of George Floyd. The protestors stated they were acting in solidarity with Native Americans; vandalism to the statue's base noted it was built on land belonging to the Powhatan. The statue was recovered from the lake on June 10 and taken away to be stored in a secure place.

== Post-2020 ==
In 2022, it was announced that the sculpture would be given to the Italian American Cultural Association of Virginia. A decision on its future placement has not been made.

In 2024, the statue was relocated to Blauvet, New York, where it now stands outside the Rockland Lodge Order of the Sons of Italy. Its restoration was funded by the Italian American Cultural Association of Virginia.

== See also ==
- Decolonization of public space
- List of monuments and memorials to Christopher Columbus
- List of monuments and memorials removed during the George Floyd protests
