= Virginia State Police =

State police force for Virginia, US

Virginia Department of State Police
- Patch of Virginia State Police

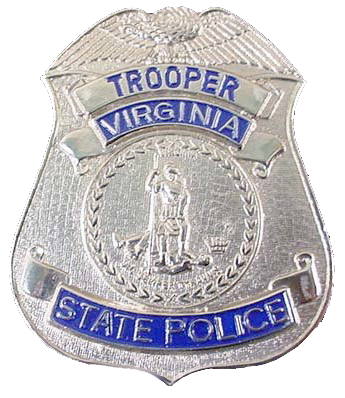
- Badge of a Trooper

- Flag of the Commonwealth of Virginia
- Common name: Virginia State Police
- Abbreviation: VSP
- Motto: Valor - Service - Pride

Agency overview
- Formed: July 1, 1932; 94 years ago
- Preceding agency: Virginia Division of Motor Vehicles
- Employees: 2,966 (as of September 24, 2018)

Jurisdictional structure
- Operations jurisdiction: U.S.
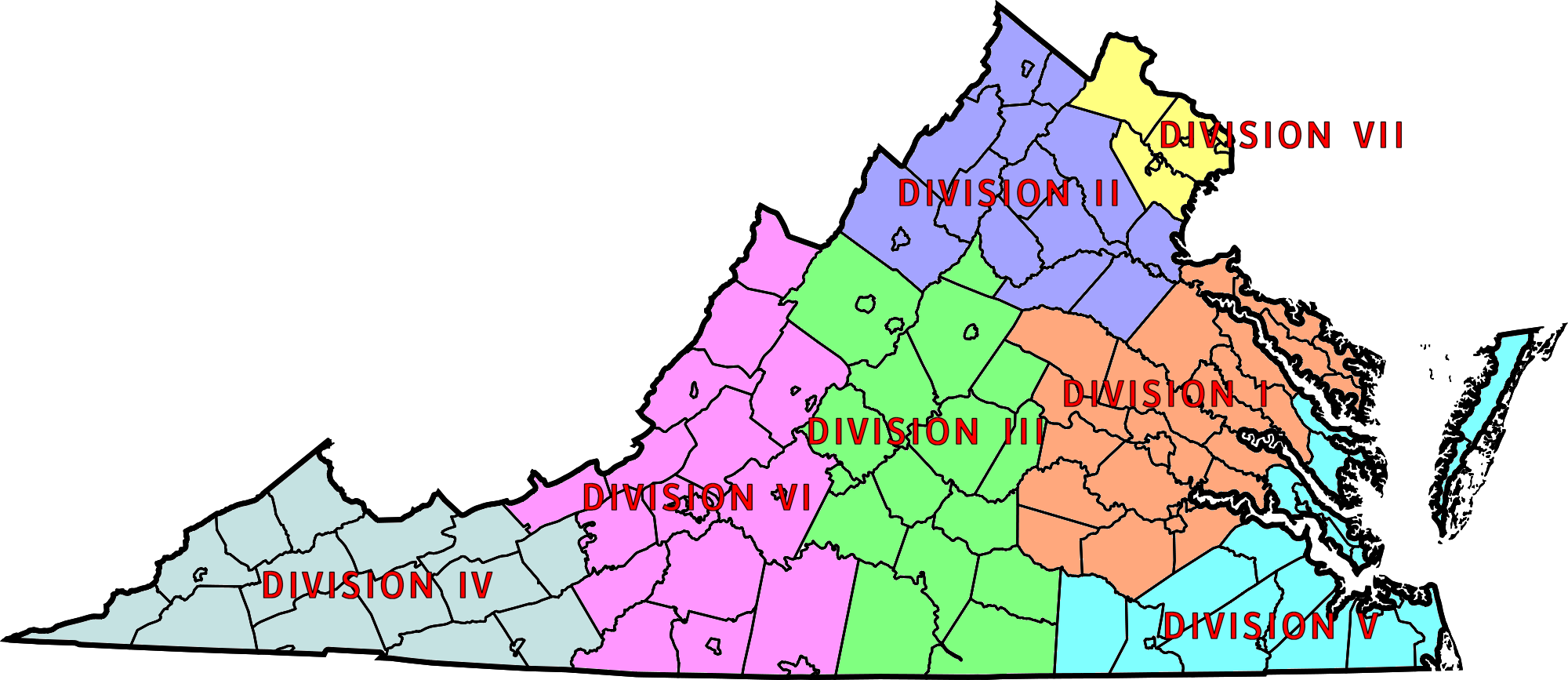
- Virginia State Police Divisions Map
- Area: 42,774 square miles (110,780 km^{2})
- Population: 8,470,020 (July 1, 2017 estimate)
- Legal jurisdiction: Commonwealth of Virginia
- General nature: Civilian police

Operational structure
- Headquarters: North Chesterfield, Virginia
- Troopers & Special Agents: 2,118 (as of 2018)
- Civilian employees: 848 civilian employees (as of 2018)
- Agency executives: Colonel Jeffrey S. Katz, Superintendent
- Parent agency: Virginia Secretary of Public Safety
- Divisions: 7

Facilities
- Airplanes: 4
- Helicopters: 7

Website
- www.vsp.virginia.gov

The Virginia State Police, officially the Virginia Department of State Police, conceived in 1919 and established in 1932, is the state police force for the Commonwealth of Virginia, located in the United States. The agency originated out of the Virginia Department of Motor Vehicles as an inspector and enforcer of highway laws. It is currently one of fourteen agencies within the Cabinet Secretariat of Public Safety. On January 5, 2026, it was announced by (then) Governor Elect Abigail Spanberger that Jeffery Katz was her selection for Superintendent of the State Police. Katz became the second superintendent in the history of the Virginia State Police to be appointed from outside the agency's ranks, following Carl R. Baker, a former member of the New York State Police who served from 1992 to 1994.

== History ==
In 1919, the Virginia State Police was conceived with the passing of the Automobile acts which stated that the Commissioner of Motor Vehicles and his assistants were vested with the powers of a Sheriff for the purpose of enforcing the provisions of the law. The Secretary of the Commonwealth continued to be responsible for this regulation. The burden of enforcement remained with Sheriffs and Constables in counties and police officers in the cities and towns.

In 1919, the Motor Vehicle Act was passed, creating the first title laws for Virginia motor vehicle owners.

In 1932, inspectors became empowered to enforce criminal codes, as well as motor vehicle codes. In doing so legislators created a state enforcement group with the power to arrest anywhere in Virginia. A mobile enforcement agency was now ready for duty wherever civil strife or emergency conditions might exist that would warrant police personnel to ensure peace and security. It was at this time that inspectors began to be known as "Troopers."

On November 3, 1938, an executive order from Majors Bishop and Nicholas officially adopted the title of "State Trooper." The purpose of this was to identify specific members of the Division of Motor Vehicles performing the role of inspector and motorcycle deputy. Also in 1938 a bureau was formed to investigate major crimes and stolen vehicles.

On March 14, 1942, the General Assembly abolished the existing Division of Motor Vehicles and created two separate agencies: The Division of Motor Vehicles and the Department of State Police. The act called for a position of superintendent for the State Police and a commissioner for the Division of Motor Vehicles. Major C. W. Woodson Jr. was officially appointed as superintendent for the State Police.

In 1973 the Virginia General Assembly authorized the creation of an Investigation Division.

In 1979 the Bureau of Criminal Investigation (BCI) was established through executive action. Troopers who were promoted into the bureau became known as Special Agents.

== Trooper training ==
Training for state troopers is divided into two phases. Academy training consists of approximately 29 weeks with 1,536 hours of instruction covering more than 100 courses. The State Police Academy is located in Chesterfield, Virginia.

The second phase is six to eight weeks of field training.

== Organizational structure ==
Under the leadership of Colonel Katz, the Virginia State Police has undergone a significant organizational realignment, including the establishment of new bureaus, the restructuring of existing divisions, and the renaming, consolidation, or discontinuation of certain organizational units.

These changes represent a broader effort to modernize the Department's organizational structure, clarify operational responsibilities, and align resources with evolving public safety priorities.

The State Police is organized under the Superintendent's Office. The Superintendent oversees the Deputy Superintendent and three Lieutenant Colonels, who serve as Executive Directors responsible for the administration, management, and operational oversight of the Department's respective bureaus, centers, and directorates.

== Executive Director / Lieutenant Colonel ==
=== Bureau of Field Operations (BFO) ===
Led by two Majors

- Seven Field Divisions: (further subdivided into 47 Area Offices)
  - Division I — Richmond
  - Division II — Culpeper
  - Division III — Appomattox
  - Division IV — Wytheville
  - Division V — Chesapeake
  - Division VI — Salem
  - Division VII — Fairfax
- Motor Carrier Safety Unit
- Canine Program
- Crime Prevention
- Dispatch / Emergency Communication Centers
- Motor Program

=== Enterprise Technology Center (ETC) ===
Led by a Director (Professional Staff (non-sworn))

- Enterprise Architecture
- Enterprise Data Services
- Enterprise IT Services
- Infrastructure and Cloud
- Project Management Office (PMO)
- Software Engineering
- Support Teams:
  - Data Analysis and Reporting Team (DART)
  - Mobile Device Team
- Supported Systems:
  - Automated Fingerprint Identification System (AFIS)
  - Computerized Criminal History (CCH)
  - Firearms Transaction Center (FTC)
  - Machine Gun Registry System
  - Motor Vehicle Inspection Program (MVIP)
  - Sex Offender Registry (SOR)
  - Virginia Criminal Information Network (VCIN)

=== Workforce Readiness Center (WRC) ===
Led by a Major

- Human Resources Division
- Training Division
- Recruitment Unit

== Executive Director / Lieutenant Colonel ==
=== Bureau of Criminal Investigation (BCI) ===
Led by a Major

- Seven Criminal Investigation Field Offices:
  - Richmond
  - Culpeper
  - Appomattox
  - Wytheville
  - Chesapeake
  - Salem
  - Fairfax
- Drug Diversion Section (DDS)
- Drug Enforcement Section (DES)
- Gaming Enforcement Unit (GEU)
- General Investigation Section (GIS)
- High Tech Crimes Division (HTCD)
  - High Tech Crimes Section (HTCS)
  - Northern Virginia / District of Columbia Internet Crimes Against Children (NOVA/DC ICAC) Task Force
  - Technical Support Section (TSS)
  - Computer Evidence Recovery Section (CERS)
- Human Trafficking Unit (HTU)
- Special Investigations & Programs Division (SIPD)
  - Interstate Criminal Enforcement (ICE) Section
  - Mass Transit Unit (MTU)
  - Drug Diversion Unit (DDU)
  - Asset Forfeiture
  - Counter-Terrorism / HAZMAT Response Program
  - Illegal Marijuana Eradication
  - Multi-Jurisdictional Task Forces
  - Human Trafficking Unit (HTU)
  - Gaming Enforcement Unit (GEU)
  - Polygraph Quality Control Section
  - Help Eliminate Auto Theft (HEAT) Program
  - Insurance Fraud Unit (IFU)

=== Center for Innovation & Partner Engagement (CIPE) ===
Led by a Director (Professional Staff (non-sworn))

Four principal functional pillars:

- Holistic Wellness Services
- Law Enforcement Training Unit
- Leadership Development and Excellence Program
- Community Outreach Programs and Services
  - Operations
    - Impaired Driver Training Unit – (IDTU)
    - Wellness Coordinator
    - Youth of Virginia Speak Out About Traffic Safety – (YOVASO)

=== Finance & General Services Center (FGSC) ===
Led by a Director (Professional Staff (non-sworn))

- Communications
- Finance Section
- Property and Logistics
  - Procurement and Contracts
- Statewide Agencies Radio System (STARS) Program
- Military Excess Property Program (1033 Program)
- State and Local Law Enforcement Equipment Procurement Program (1122 Program)

== Executive Director / Lieutenant Colonel ==
=== Bureau of Critical Support (BCS) ===
Led by a Major

- Aviation Division
  - Med-Flight Program
  - Search and Rescue
  - Law Enforcement Aviation Support
- Executive Protection Division
- Special Operations Division
  - Operational Medical Support Unit
  - Search and Recovery Team
  - Tactical Team
- Photo Speed Safety Monitoring Program
- Emergency Management Liaison / Continuity of Operations (COOP) Coordinator

=== Intelligence Operations Directorate (IOD) ===
Led by a Director (Professional Staff (non-sworn))

- Virginia Fusion Center
  - Information Sharing and Analysis
  - Training and Education
  - Behavioral Threat Assessment and Management (BTAM)
  - Cybersecurity Support
  - Community Engagement
  - Investigative Support
  - Intelligence Products

=== Public Safety Programs Center (PSPC) ===
Led by a Major

- Biometric Records Section (BRS)
- Civil & Applicant Records Exchange (CARE)
- Missing Children Clearinghouse (MCC)
- Vehicle Safety Inspection
  - Antique Vehicle Registration
  - Vehicle Inspection Program
- Virginia Criminal Information Network (VCIN)

The center also oversees operations involving the National Crime Information Center (NCIC) and the International Justice and Public Safety Network (Nlets).

== Deputy Superintendent's Office ==
=== Office of Professional Responsibility (OPR) ===
Led by a Major

- Information Security
- Internal Audit
- Office of Diversity and Engagement
- Office of Legal Affairs
  - Freedom of Information Act (FOIA) / Records Requests
- Professional Standards Division
- Strategic Planning and Research Division

=== Public Relations Center (PRC) ===
Led by a Director (Professional Staff (non-sworn))

- Statewide Public Relations
- Regional Public Information Officers:
  - Division I — Richmond
  - Division II — Culpeper
  - Division III — Appomattox
  - Division IV — Wytheville
  - Division V — Chesapeake
  - Division VI — Salem
  - Division VII — Fairfax
- Media Relations
- Public Information and Education

== Uniform and equipment ==
=== Uniform ===
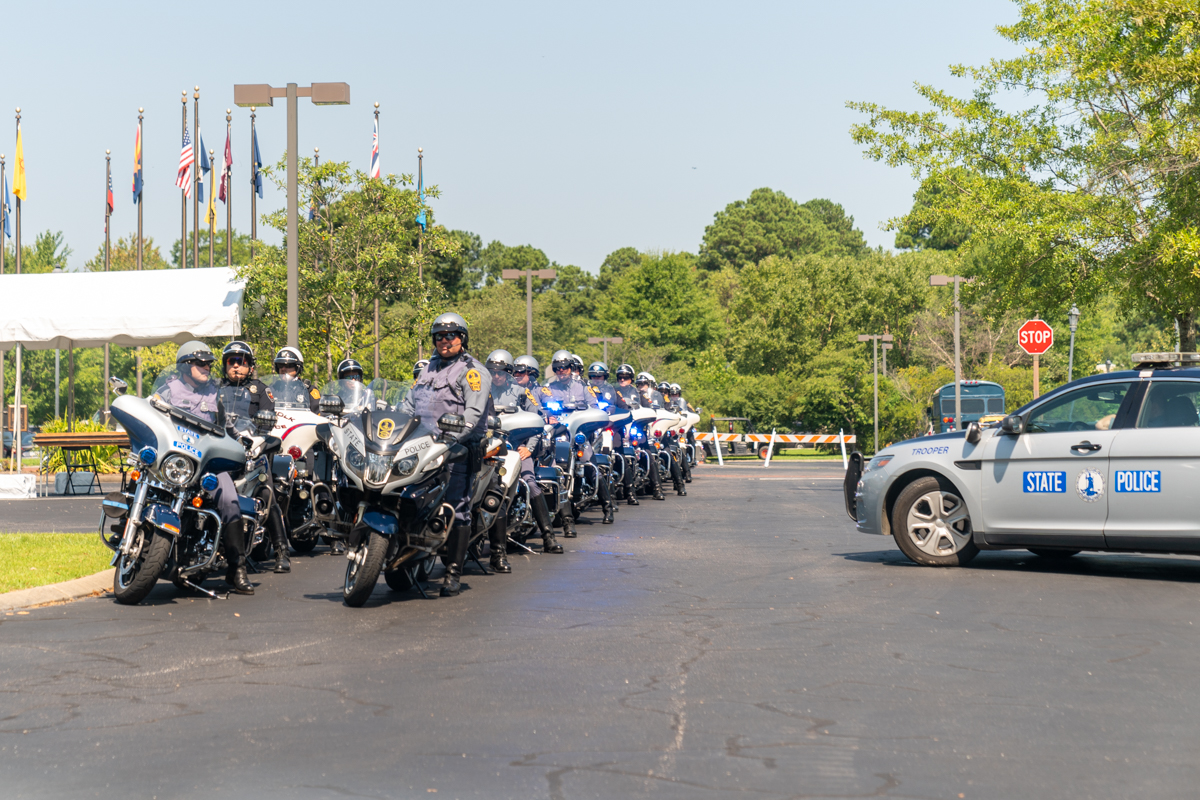
State Troopers in 2019

The standard Trooper uniform consists of a light gray button-up shirt, available in three styles: long sleeves with a black tie, long sleeves with a pressed open collar, or short sleeves with a pressed open collar. Uniform patches are sewn onto both sleeves of the shirt. Gray trousers featuring a dark blue stripe running down each side are worn year-round. The uniform is completed with black Clarino shoes and a black Sam Browne gun belt without a cross strap.

A black semi-gloss straw Campaign hat is worn year round. A winter cap can be worn in the colder months.

A dark blue dress blouse and standard black Clarino Sam Browne gun belt, without the cross strap, are worn for special occasions. Dark blue work jackets are utilized for colder months.

Sergeants and First Sergeants wear silver, out lined in blue, chevrons showing their rank on both sleeves. Lieutenants and above wear their rank insignia on the shirt collar.

First Sergeants and below wear silver, out lined in blue, hash marks on the left sleeve denoting years of service. Each hash mark represents five years of service.

=== Issued Weapons ===
Beginning in late 2018, Troopers of all ranks and Special Agents are issued the SIG Sauer P320 .357 SIG pistol, while Troopers & Special Agents ranked First Sergeant and below are also issued the Benelli Supernova 12-gauge, pump-action shotgun and the Sig Sauer M400, 5.56 patrol rifle. Less-than-lethal weapons carried by troopers include OC spray and the ASP baton.

==== Previous Issued Weapons ====
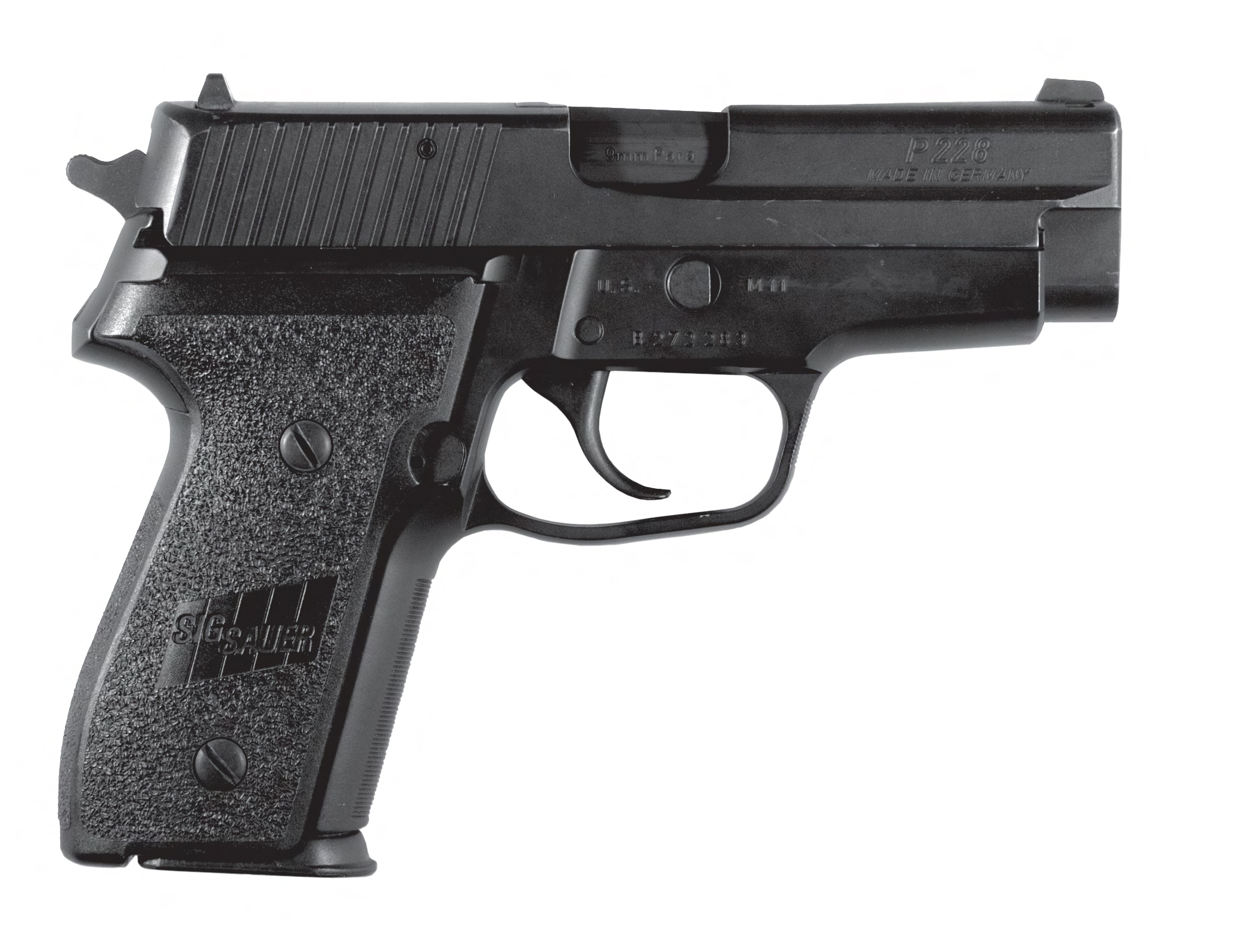
SIG Sauer P228

- Remington Model 870 12-gauge Police Magnum shotgun, issued till 2019
- SIG Sauer P229 R .357 SIG DAK pistol, issued from 2004 to 2018
- SIG Sauer P229 DA/SA .357 SIG, issued from 1997 to 2004
- SIG Sauer P228 DA/SA 9mm, issued from 1993 to 1997
- Smith & Wesson Model 1026 10mm DA/SA 5-inch barrel stainless semi-auto pistol, issued from 1990 to 1993
- Smith & Wesson Model 64 .38 caliber 4-inch barrel stainless steel revolver, issued in the mid 1970s to 1990
- Colt Officer's Model .38 caliber 4-inch barrel revolver was used from 1967 until the mid-1970s.
- Colt Official Police .38 caliber 6-inch barrel revolver was used up until 1967
- Thompson submachine gun .45 caliber used from the 1930s until 1974

=== Issued Vehicles ===
The department has used many different makes and models since its early days.

==== Patrol Cars ====
Prior to 1928, inspectors only used automobiles once they had seized a vehicle used to transport illegal whiskey and it had been released to the Division for enforcement purposes by the courts. Fords became the first issued patrol vehicles in 1928. In 1932, white Chevrolet roadsters and white motorcycles were purchased and became known as the "Great White Fleet". Fords and Chevys were the main staple of the patrol force in the 1930s and early 1940s. In 1945 post-war acquisitions of police vehicles were rare and troopers made arrangements to purchase vehicles wherever they could. Buicks and Pontiacs supplemented the fleet until auto manufacturers resumed normal production.

In 1948, the Department adopted the distinctive blue and gray paint scheme for all vehicles. Later in 1952, reflective markings were adopted and used for all marked vehicles. Those same markings are still in use today.

During the 1940s, 50's, 60's, 70's, and 80's the Department purchased Fords, Chevy's, Chryslers, and Plymouths for use as patrol cars. Ford's and Chevy's were used mainly used in the 90's and 2000's. Dodge Chargers were introduced into the fleet in 2006.

Red emergency lights were in use until 1985 and then were replaced with blue emergency lights. Bar lights were phased onto vehicles in 1988 replacing the single "bubble gum" light. "TROOPER" decals were added to the front fenders of patrol cars in 1995. In 1999, the Department adopted Ford's silver, replacing the traditional paint scheme's gray. Only the hood, roof and trunk were painted blue. This was due to budget constraints and that Ford stopped using that particular gray paint. "Slicktop" Chevrolet Impalas were put into use beginning in 2001. Seven "slicktop" 2002 Chevrolet 9C1 Camaros were put into service in high traffic areas in 2002.

In 2006, the Department purchased 30+ Hemi V8 Dodge Chargers and for the first time since 1948 adopted new graphics for the marked and slicktop Chargers.

In 2008, the Virginia State Police's Dodge Charger was Law and Order Magazine's Police Vehicle Design Winner for State and Federal Agencies.

In 2013, the Ford Police Interceptor Sedan was added to the fleet of Virginia State Police vehicles since the Ford Crown Victoria model ceased production. In 2019, the Virginia State Police bought every available new Police Interceptor sedan, giving the state a steady supply of new Interceptor sedans for up to 5 years beyond the model's discontinuation depending on vehicle attrition due to accidents or other damage.

In 2019, the department added Ford Police Interceptor Utility SUV for specialty units (K-9, TacTeam and Motor Carrier units).

Starting in 2020, the department took delivery of their new patrol vehicles, the 2020 Ford Police Interceptor Utility. Dressed in all silver and adopting newer styled graphics, first used on the 2006 Dodge Chargers. The introduction of these new graphics ended a long tradition of their blue and gray paint scheme, in use since 1948, and their traditional graphics, in use since 1952. These new patrol vehicles ended another long tradition; the adoption of red emergency lights in combination with blue and the use of internal light bars instead of roof mounted lights.

As of 2021, the Virginia State Police fleet consists primarily of 2013–2019 Ford Police Interceptor Sedans and 2020 and 2021 Ford Police Interceptor Utilities. These vehicles are supplemented by 2013–2022 Chevrolet Tahoe PPVs primarily used for specialty units and 2020 Ford F-350 Super Duty XLs as utility vehicles; as well as the remaining Ford Crown Victoria Police Interceptors and unmarked Chevrolet Impala PPVs.

In March 2025, the Virginia State Police added several 2025 Ford Mustang GTs to their fleet. The purpose of these vehicles is for general patrol, particularly speed enforcement, and also as a recruitment tool. Being the GT trim, these Mustangs come equipped with the 4th Gen Coyote 5.0L V8. There are currently 9 Mustangs used by the Virginia State Police as a trial run, with plans of adding up to 40 more.

VSP Mustang at Nascar race

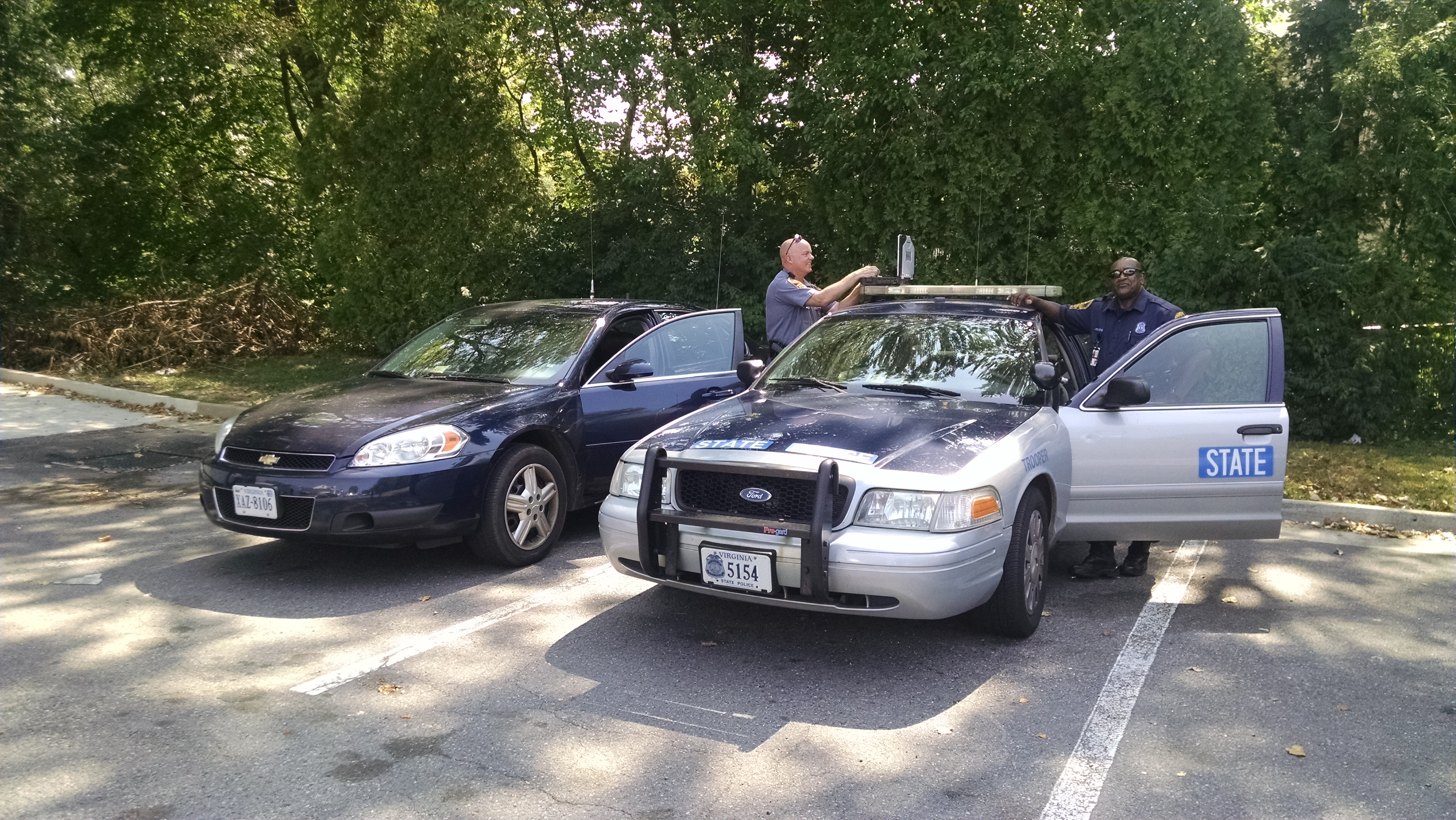
Two Virginia State Troopers in Fairfax County, Virginia with a Chevrolet Impala PPV (left) and Ford Crown Victoria Police Interceptor (right)

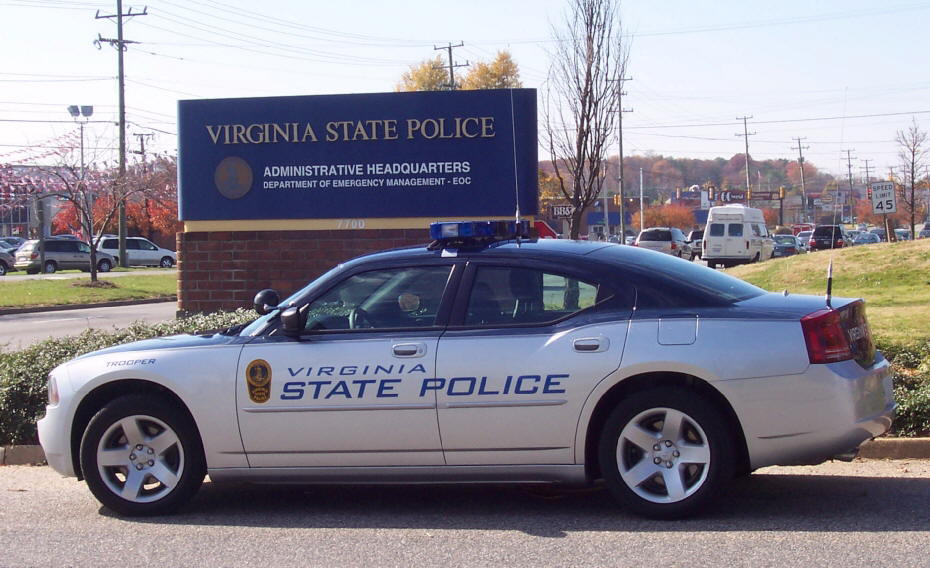
VSP 2006 Dodge Charger in front of VSP Administrative Headquarters

==== Aviation Division ====
- 5 Bell 407 Helicopters
- 1 Bell 412EPI Helicopter
- 1 Airbus EC-145 Helicopters
- 3 Cessna 206 Turbo Stationair Airplanes
- 3 Kodiak 100 Special Mission Aircraft

== Rank s tructure ==
Bureau of Field Operations (BFO)

Rank	Insignia	Description
Superintendent / Colonel		Superintendent of State Police
Deputy Superintendent / Lieutenant Colonel		Deputy Superintendent
Major		Bureau Deputy Director
Captain		Division Commander
Lieutenant		Field / Headquarters Lieutenant / Staff Assistant
First Sergeant		Area Commander
Sergeant		First-line supervisor
Master Trooper		Career Progression, based on length of service, 25+ years
Senior Trooper		Career Progression, based on length of service, 9+ years
Trooper-Pilot		Trooper's assigned to the Aviation Unit
Trooper II		Career Progression, automatic after 1 year probationary period
Trooper I		Probationary Trooper, first year in the field
Trainee		Status while attending the state police academy

Bureau of Criminal Investigation (BCI)

- Major (Bureau Deputy Director)
- Captain (Division Commander)
- Lieutenant (Special Agent in Charge / Section Commander / Staff Assistant)
- First Sergeant (Assistant Special Agent in Charge / Unit Commander / First-line supervisor)
- Supervisory Special Agent (Task Force Coordinators)
- Senior Special Agent, career progression
- Special Agent

== See also ==
- List of law enforcement agencies in Virginia
- State police
- State patrol
- Highway patrol
- Virginia Capitol Police
