= Richmond Police Department (Virginia) =

- Abbreviation: RPD

Agency overview
- Formed: 1807
- Employees: 775.10
- Annual budget: $131,904,713 million

Jurisdictional structure
- Operations jurisdiction: Richmond, Virginia, United States
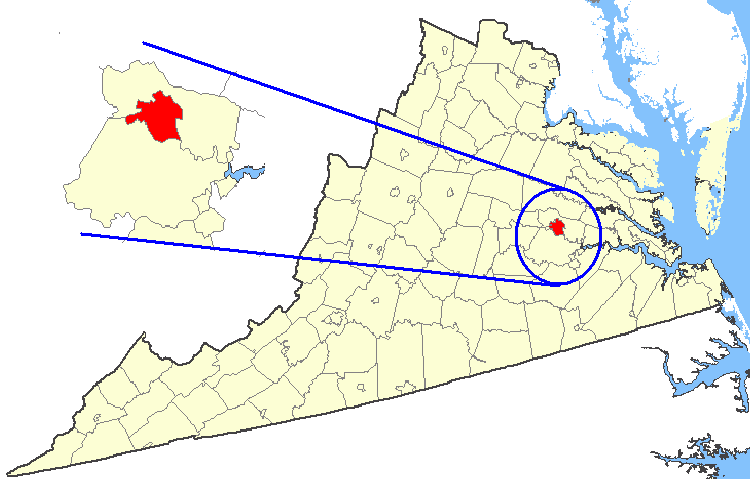
- Map of Richmond Police Department's jurisdiction
- Area: 62.5 square miles (162 km^{2})
- Population: 230,436
- Legal jurisdiction: Richmond, Virginia
- General nature: Local civilian police

Operational structure
- Headquarters: 200 West Grace Street; Richmond, Virginia 23220
- Officers: 750
- Civilians: 170
- Agency executive: Rick Edwards, Chief of Police

Facilities
- Precincts: Four precincts

Website
- Richmond Police Department Website

The Richmond Police Department (RPD) is the primary law enforcement agency for the 230,436 people within the 62.5 square miles (162 km^{2}) jurisdiction of Richmond, Virginia. The department employs about 750 sworn officers and about 170 civilians.

On July 31, 2010, the Richmond Police Department received law enforcement accreditation from the Commission on Accreditation for Law Enforcement Agencies (CALEA). RPD received CALEA reaccreditation in 2013 and 2016.

Since the establishment of the Richmond Police Department in 1807, 39 officers have died while on duty.

The approved general fund expenditure for the Richmond Police Department in fiscal year 2020 was $96,104,518.

== Chief's Office ==
ID card of a RPD policeman, 1960s

On June 15, 2020, Mayor Levar Stoney requested and received the resignation of former Chief William C. Smith, following two weeks of protests in response to the murder of George Floyd. That same day, Stoney appointed Major William Blackwell as Interim Chief of the Richmond Police Department. After serving in the role for 11 days, Blackwell announced that he was stepping down on June 26, 2020. Mayor Stoney announced that day that he had hand-picked a new permanent chief, Gerald M. Smith, who would take over the role on July 1, 2020.

Division	Director
Patrol Services	Deputy Chief John O'Kleasky
Support Services	Deputy Chief Sydney G. Collier
Critical Incident Management	Deputy Chief Sydney G. Collier
Watch Commanders	Deputy Chief Sydney G. Collier
Business Services	Deputy Chief Mr. William Friday
Internal Affairs	Captain Greer Gould
General Counsel	David Mitchell
Public Affairs	Gene Lepley

== Patrol Services ==
The city of Richmond is divided into two areas consisting of four precincts and twelve sectors. As of June 2020, Patrol Services is under the command of Deputy Chief John O'Kleasky.

- Area 1 Commander: Major Darrell Goins
  - First Precinct Commander: Captain Richard Edwards (Sector 111, Sector 112, Sector 113)
  - Second Precinct Commander: Captain Jason Hudson (Sector 211, Sector 212, Sector 213)
- Area 2 Commander: Major Sybil El-Amin
  - Third Precinct Commander: Captain Martin Harrison (Sector 311, Sector 312, Sector 313)
  - Fourth Precinct Commander: Captain Daniel Minton (Sector 411, Sector 412, Sector 413)

== Support Services ==
- Major Crimes includes the Forensics, Homicide, Violent Crimes, and Youth and Family Crimes Units.
- Special Investigations Division includes the Gang, Narcotics, Asset Forfeiture, Vice, and Computer-Aided Crimes units.
- Special Events Division includes the functional areas of traffic accident investigation and enforcement, commercial motor vehicle inspection, fatality crash investigations, homeland security, aerial patrol and transport, hostage negotiations and SWAT operations, crowd management, Neighborhood Assistance Officers, Mounted Patrol, permits (parking, street closures, parade events), and narcotic and patrol K-9 operations.

== Business Services ==
As of June 2020, Deputy Chief Mr. William Friday directs Business Services, which consists of the following areas:

- Finance Services is responsible for the budget; grants management; payroll and accounting; purchasing and procurement; and property and evidence.
- Human Resources is responsible for recruitment, personnel management, and disciplinary review. The division is composed of seven units: Background Investigations, Civilian Training, Disciplinary Review, Employee Relations, Polygraph Examinations, Risk Management, and Recruitment and Staffing.
- The Planning Division is responsible for the developing and updating policies and forms; coordinating accreditation compliance; and managing RPD strategic planning, including performance measurement and preparing annual reports. The division also includes the Crime Analysis Unit.
- The Records and Technology Division manages all technical hardware and software services and systems. The division also includes the department's Information Services, Warrant Services, Body Cameras, and the Records Management System team.
- The Training Division is responsible for training of all department employees and oversees operations of the Training Academy.

== Community, Youth, and Intervention Services ==
As of June 2020, Captain Faith Flippo directs Community, Youth, and Intervention Services, which consists of the following areas:

- Community Assisted Public Safety (CAPS)
- Hispanic Liaison Officer
- Homeless Outreach Partnerships Enforcement (HOPE Unit)
- Richmond Police Athletic League
- School Resource Officers
- Volunteers in Policing

== Rank structure ==
The RPD uses the following rank structure:

Insignia	Rank title	Information
	Chief	Commander of the department.
	Deputy Chief	Commands Patrol Services or Support Services.
	Major	Commands an Area.
	Captain	Commands a Division or Precinct.
	Lieutenant	Commands a Section or Unit.
	Sergeant	Supervisor
	Corporal	
	Police Officer	

== See also ==
- List of law enforcement agencies in Virginia
- Government of Richmond, Virginia
