= Virginia Division of Capitol Police =

Oldest police department in the United States of America

Jurisdictional structure
- Constituting instrument: Section 30-34.2:1 of the Code of Virginia

Operational structure
- Overseen by: Legislative Support Committee

Website
- http://dcp.virginia.gov/

The Virginia Division of Capitol Police is America's oldest police department, originating in 1618.

A legislative agency, today the Division of Capitol Police is responsible for:

- General Law Enforcement for the Capitol Complex and properties assigned to the agency. They also share concurrent jurisdiction with the Richmond City Police Department.
- Protective services for the Governor and Virginia's First Family while they are in-residence at the Executive Mansion.
- Protective services and details for the Lieutenant Governor, Attorney General, the Justices of Virginia's Supreme Court, and members of the Virginia Legislature.
- Special event assignments and security details throughout the Commonwealth

== History ==
The capitol police was established in 1618 at Jamestown, Virginia. The Guard, consisting of 10 men was formed to protect the Governor from the hostile Indian population. By 1663, the force was expanded to a force of 20 men and assigned to protect the Governor, the council, and the Colonial Assembly. The Capitol was moved to Williamsburg, Virginia in 1699 where the Guard remained an important part of the executive and legislative process. In 1780, the Capitol of Virginia was again relocated to a safer location, its present home in Richmond. In 1801, the General Assembly enacted legislation creating The Public Guard, which was responsible for protecting public property in Richmond. This military force remained active until 1869.

The term "Capitol Police" was first used in an act of the Virginia General Assembly passed on January 28, 1884. This act provided "for the appointment of Capitol Police certain other employees about the Public Buildings and Grounds." The Capitol Police have steadily expanded in size and remain in service to this day.

== Operations ==
=== Uniformed Operations ===
Uniformed Patrol, Homeland Security, Special Operations and Investigations

- Uniformed Patrol
- K-9
- Emergency Medical Technicians
- Investigations
- Executive Protection
- Security Clearances
- Honor Guard

=== Administrative Operations ===
Emergency Preparedness Section and Administrative Section

- Crime Prevention
- Accreditation
- Communications
- Information Technology
- Training
- Quartermaster
- Security Clearance Office

The Virginia State Police Executive Protective Division is the primary security for the Governor.

== See also ==
- List of law enforcement agencies in Virginia
