= Government of Richmond, Virginia =

US city government

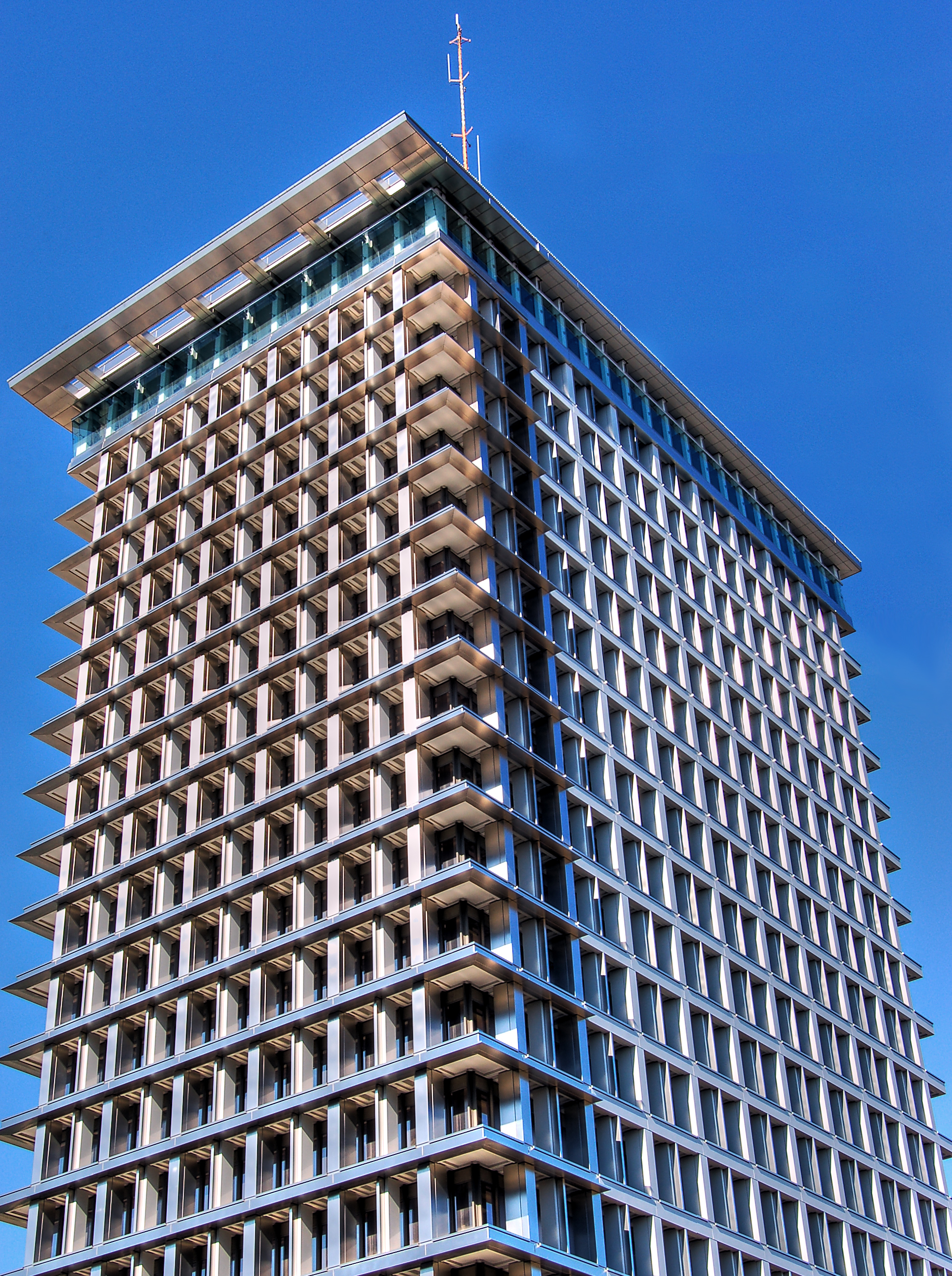
City Hall in Richmond, Virginia

The government of Richmond, Virginia, headquartered at Richmond City Hall in Downtown Richmond, is organized under the Charter of Richmond, Virginia and provides for a "strong" mayor-council system. The mayor is elected to a four-year term and is responsible for the administration of city government. The Richmond City Council is a unicameral body consisting of nine members, each elected to represent a geographic district. The city of Richmond is located in the 13th Judicial Circuit of Virginia, and its court system consists of a circuit court and four district courts.

Richmond's government employs approximately 4,000 people. The city government is responsible for public education, correctional institutions, public safety, recreational facilities, sanitation, water supply, and welfare services.

== Mayor's Office ==
The current Mayor of Richmond and 81st in the sequence of regular officeholders is Democrat Danny Avula. Avula was elected in the 2024 Richmond mayoral election.

=== Mayor's Staff ===
| Position | Individual | Assumed office |
|---|---|---|
| Chief of Staff | Lincoln Saunders | January 1, 2017 |
| Senior Assistant to the Mayor | Laura Harrison | |
| Senior Policy Advisor (Community Engagement and Liaison to LGBTQ Community) | Osita Iroegbu | |
| Senior Policy Advisor (Youth Initiatives) | Eva Colen | May 22, 2018 |
| Policy Analyst | Margaret Anderson | |
| Constituent Services Manager | Tameka Jefferson | |
| Executive Staff Assistant to the Mayor | Terelle Robinson | |
| Executive Assistant | Lela Jefferson | |

=== Office of the Press Secretary to the Mayor ===
The Office of the Press Secretary to the Mayor serves as the public relations advisor to the Mayor and the Chief Administrative Officer and is the primary contact for the news media. As of June 2020, Jim Nolan served as the Director of Communications for the office of the Press Secretary.

== City Council ==
The Richmond City Council consists of nine members, each elected to represent one of the nine Richmond Voting Districts for a four-year term. The City Council is responsible for creating and amending local laws, providing policy and government oversight, appointing members to boards and commissions, and approving the annual city budget. The City Council elects one of its members to serve as council president and one to serve as vice president, each for two-year terms. There are six standing committees, each consisting of three City Council members and one alternate: Finance and Economic Development; Health, Human Services and Education; Land Use, Housing and Transportation; Governmental Operations; Organizational Development; and Public Safety. The Council President reviews all proposed legislation and assigns it to the appropriate standing committee according to subject matter. The standing committee then reviews the proposed legislation and returns its recommendation to the full Council.

The Richmond City Council uses ordinances and resolutions to create and amend local laws and to affect local government operations. In the City of Richmond, City Council ordinances have the effect of local law and are codified in the Richmond Code of Laws. City Council resolutions generally do not have the effect of law but instead are used to express the Council's will, intent, or policy on a particular matter. Resolutions are also generally used to appoint individuals to serve on local and regional boards, commissions, committees, and task forces. As of 2020, there are approximately fifty such groups that help provide oversight on various topics, programs, and services.

=== Richmond City Council Members ===
As of January 2021, the Richmond City Council consisted of:

- Andreas D. Addison, 1st District (West End)
- Katherine Jordan, 2nd District (North Central)
- Ann-Frances Lambert, 3rd District (Northside)
- Kristen Nye, 4th District (Southwest)
- Stephanie A. Lynch, 5th District (Central)
- Ellen F. Robertson, 6th District (Gateway), Council Vice President
- Cynthia I. Newbille, 7th District (East End), Council President
- Reva M. Trammell, 8th District (Southside)
- Michael J. Jones, 9th District (South Central)

=== Richmond City Council Offices ===
The Richmond City Council appoints and provides oversight of six offices.

- The Office of the Council Chief of Staff provides support to the City Council through policy analysis, budget analysis, project analysis, public information management, and public relations.
- The Office of the City Clerk is responsible for sharing information about City Council so that citizens can be engaged in legislative and policy processes, providing administrative and technical support to the City Council, and preserving official records.
- The Office of the City Auditor was established by the Charter of Richmond, Virginia to provide auditing services to city agencies.
- The Office of the City Attorney serves as the legal advisor of the City Council, the Mayor, the Chief Administrative Officer and all departments, boards, commissions and agencies of the city government.
- The Office of the City Assessor of Real Estate is responsible for the annual reassessment of real estate, the property rehabilitation program, the real estate tax exemption process, and providing public access to property information through the city's real estate database.
- The Office of the Inspector General is responsible for preventing, detecting, and investigating allegations of fraud, waste, and abuse committed by city employees.

== Other Elected Officials ==
Article VII, Section 4 of the Constitution of Virginia requires each county and city to elect a treasurer, sheriff, Commonwealth's attorney, clerk, and commissioner of revenue.

=== Commonwealth's Attorney ===
Commonwealth's attorney is the title given to prosecutors in Virginia, who are elected for four year terms. As of June 2020, Colette McEachin was the Commonwealth Attorney for the City of Richmond with a term ending in 2021. McEachin assumed the role of interim Commonwealth's Attorney upon the resignation of Michael Herring on July 1, 2019. McEachin ran unopposed as the Democratic Party candidate in the 2019 special general election to fill the remainder of Herring's term and was elected with 97.6% of the vote.

=== Richmond Circuit Court Clerk ===
Virginia circuit court clerks are elected for eight year terms. As of June 2020, Edward F. Jewett served as the Richmond Circuit Court Clerk with a term ending in 2028. Jewett, formerly the chief deputy clerk, assumed the office of Interim Circuit Court Clerk in 2014 upon the retirement of Circuit Court Clerk Bevill M. Dean. He was elected as Circuit Court Clerk in a 2014 special election to fill the remainder of Dean's term. Jewett ran unopposed as the Democratic Party candidate in the 2019 general election and was elected with 98% of the vote.

=== Richmond City Sheriff ===
Sheriffs in Virginia are elected for four year terms. As of June 2020, Antoinette V. Irving was the Sheriff for the City of Richmond. Prior to assuming the office of Sheriff on January 1, 2018, Irving worked in the Henrico County Sheriff's Office for over 25 years, where she was the first woman to be promoted to the rank of major. In the 2017 Democratic primary, Irving was successful in her third consecutive attempt to unseat the incumbent, Sheriff C.T. Woody Jr., who was running for a fourth term. Irving narrowly defeated Woody in the Democratic primary, receiving 51.7% of the vote, and she won the 2017 general election with 61.5% of the vote.

=== Richmond City Treasurer ===
As of June 2020, Nicole R. Armistead was the Richmond City Treasurer. Armistead ran as the Democratic Party candidate in the 2017 general election and was elected as city treasurer with 47% of the vote.

== Agencies ==
| Department | Director |
|---|---|
| Animal Care and Control | Christie Chipps Peters |
| Budget and Strategic Planning | Jay A. Brown |
| City Treasurer's Office | Treasurer Nichole Richardson Armstead |
| Community Wealth Building | Valaryee N. Mitchell |
| Economic Development | |
| Emergency Communications | Stephen M. Willoughby |
| Finance | |
| Fire and Emergency Services | Fire Chief Melvin D. Carter |
| Housing and Community Development | |
| Human Resources | Mona Adkins-Easley |
| Human Services | Reggie Gordon |
| Information Technology | Charles Todd |
| Justice Services | Dawn Barber |
| Minority Business Development | |
| Parks, Recreation and Community Facilities | |
| Planning and Development Review | |
| Procurement Services | |
| Public Utilities | |
| Public Works | Bobby Vincent Jr. |
| Richmond Police Department | Chief Gerald M. Smith |
| Sheriff's Office | Sheriff Antoinette V. Irving |
| Social Services | Shunda Giles |
| Sustainability | |

== Courts ==
- Richmond Adult Drug Treatment Court
- Richmond Circuit Court
- District Courts
  - Richmond Civil General District Court
  - Richmond John Marshall Criminal-Traffic General District Court
  - Richmond Marsh Criminal-Traffic at Manchester General District Court
  - Richmond Juvenile and Domestic Relations District Court

== Independent agencies and or partnerships ==
- Community Development Authority
- Greater Richmond Convention Center Authority
- Greater Richmond Transit Company
- Economic Development Authority
- Office of the General Registrar
- Port of Richmond
- Richmond Ambulance Authority
- Richmond Metropolitan Convention and Visitor's Bureau
- Richmond Public Schools
- Richmond Redevelopment and Housing Authority
- Virginia Department of Health's Richmond City Health District

== Observation Deck ==
Richmond City Hall Observation Deck is the observation deck on the 18th floor of the City Hall. While the public used to be able to access this through the elevators on the main floor, access is currently limited to city personnel only.

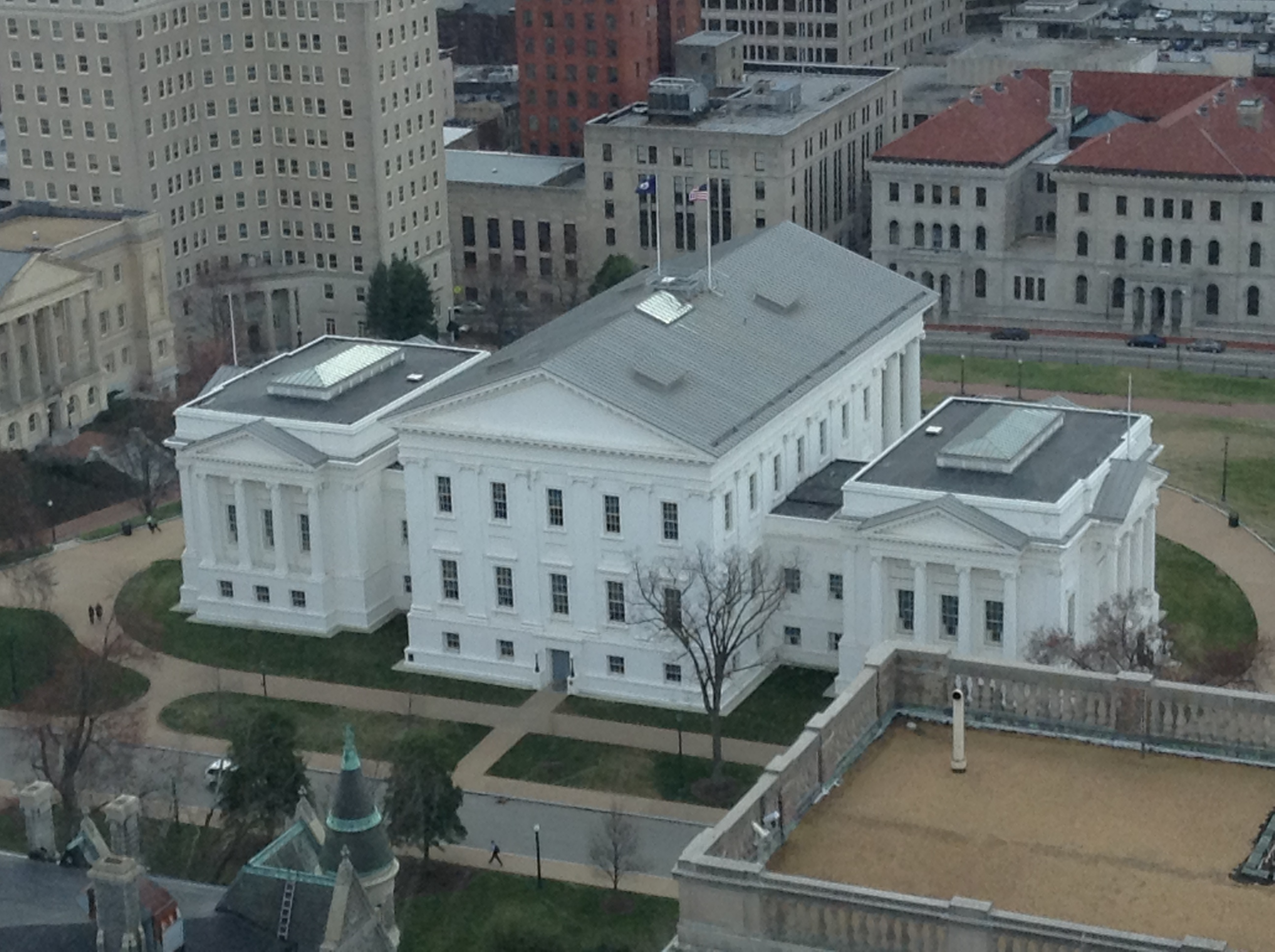
View from Richmond Virginia City Hall Observation Deck - South (overlooking the Virginia State Capitol)

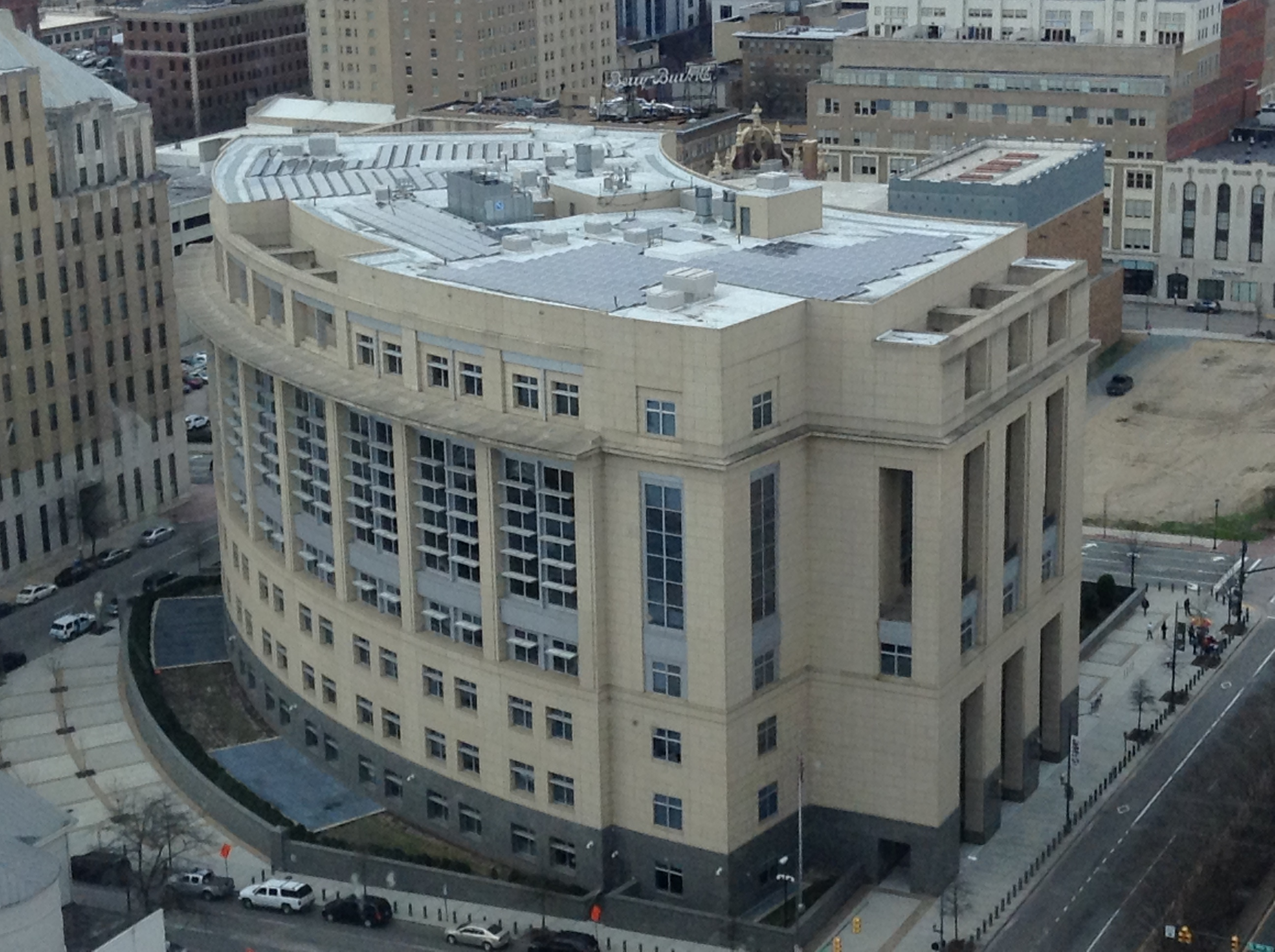
View from Richmond Virginia City Hall Observation Deck - East

== See also ==
- Richmond, Virginia
- List of mayors of Richmond, Virginia
