= Byrd Park =

- William Byrd Park, New Reservoir Park
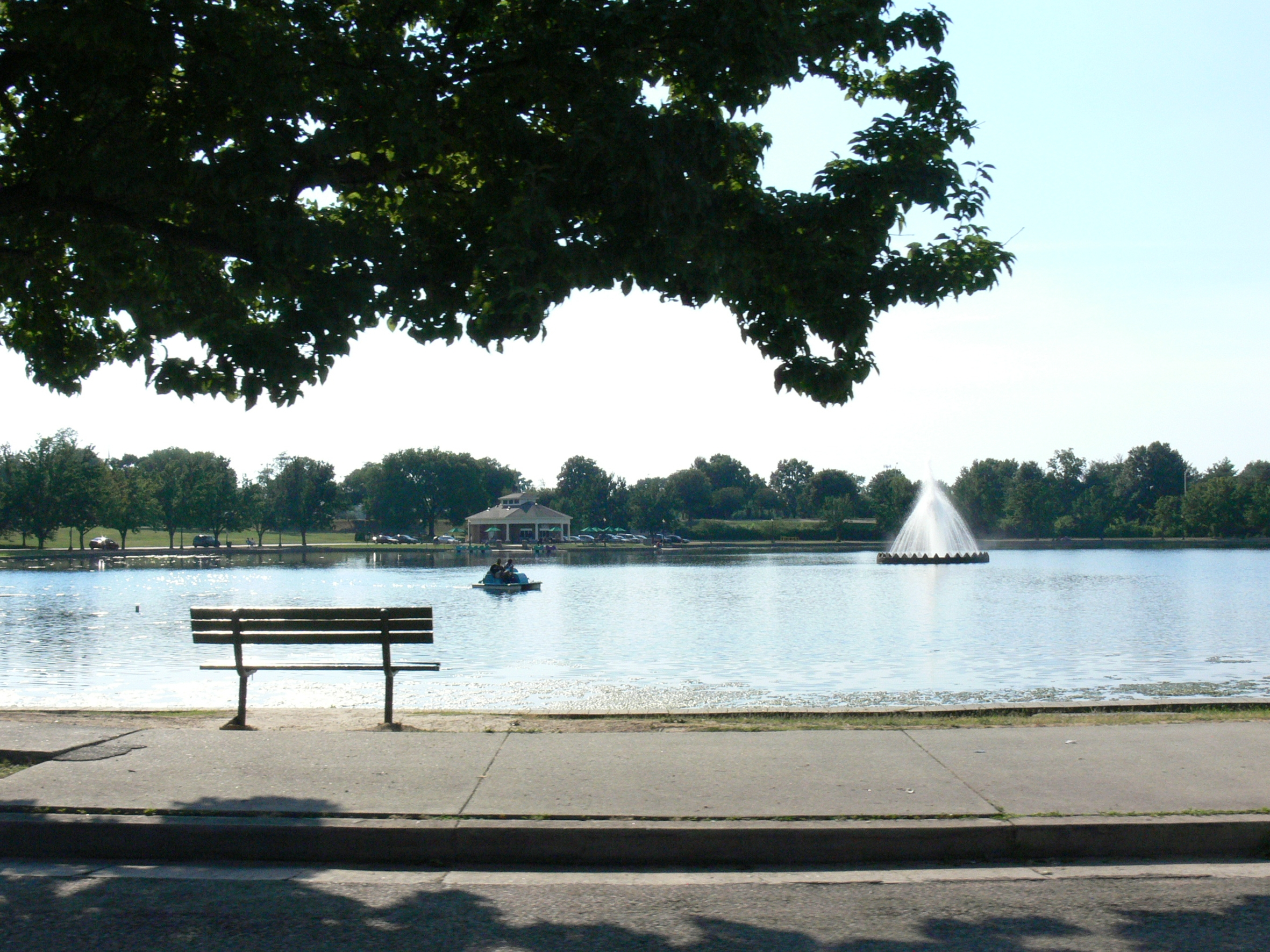
- Boats on Fountain Lake
- Interactive map of Byrd Park
- Type: Public Park
- Location: Richmond, Virginia
- Area: 268.7 acres (108.7 ha)
- Created: 1875-1888
- Operator: City of Richmond
- Open: Year-Round

Byrd Park, also known as William Byrd Park, is a public park located in Richmond, Virginia, United States, north of the James River and adjacent to Maymont. The 287-acre (1.16 km^{2}) park includes a mile-long trail with exercise stops, monuments, an amphitheatre, and three small lakes: Shields (sometimes spelled Sheilds), Swan, and Boat Lake. Boat Lake (also called Fountain Lake) has a lighted fountain at its center. Visitors can rent pedal boats there in season. The park includes tennis courts, Little League baseball fields, and a children's playground. The historic round house and Poplar Vale Cemetery are also located in the park. It is named after William Byrd II, whose family owned much of the area when Richmond was founded in 1737. The park was listed on the National Register of Historic Places in 2016.

== History ==
In 1873, the city of Richmond began the creation of a new municipal waterworks system, in order to replace an earlier one which had become insufficient for the growing city. In 1874, a site was chosen upriver to the west of the city, and from 1875 to 1888, the land was acquired and the reservoir constructed. The pit used for building up the earthen berms became what is now Fountain Lake, itself fed by the reservoir. In 1884, the New Pump-House was completed at the base of the hill, drawing water from the defunct James River and Kanawha Canal and pumping it up to the reservoir. The large tract of parkland surrounding the reservoir was descriptively named New Reservoir Park, with the equally aptly named Boulevard serving to house the water main leading from the reservoir to the thoroughfare of Broad Street, simultaneously providing access to the park.

By 1907, the park had been renamed William Byrd Park, and by 1914 plans had begun for the construction of two additional lakes: Shield's Lake and Swann Lake.

The park's Statue of Christopher Columbus, erected in 1927, was controversial at the time of its construction because it honored Italian-Americans in a climate of increasing anti-immigration sentiment. In 2020, during the George Floyd protests, Columbus became controversial for a different reason: his killing of Native Americans and his initiation of the slave trade. On June 9, 2020, citizens toppled the statue after vandalizing it and then threw it into Fountain Lake.

In 2016, the Richmond Police Memorial Research and Relocation Site Committee completed the relocation of the Richmond Police Memorial to Byrd Park. The memorial is an 8-foot-tall bronze statue of a police officer carrying a girl clutching a teddy bear, along with a plaque of the names of 28 Richmond police officers killed from 1869 to 2003. The memorial was moved from the park after being vandalized following the murder of George Floyd.

== The Carillon ==
- Virginia War Memorial Carillon
- U.S. National Register of Historic Places
- Virginia Landmarks Register
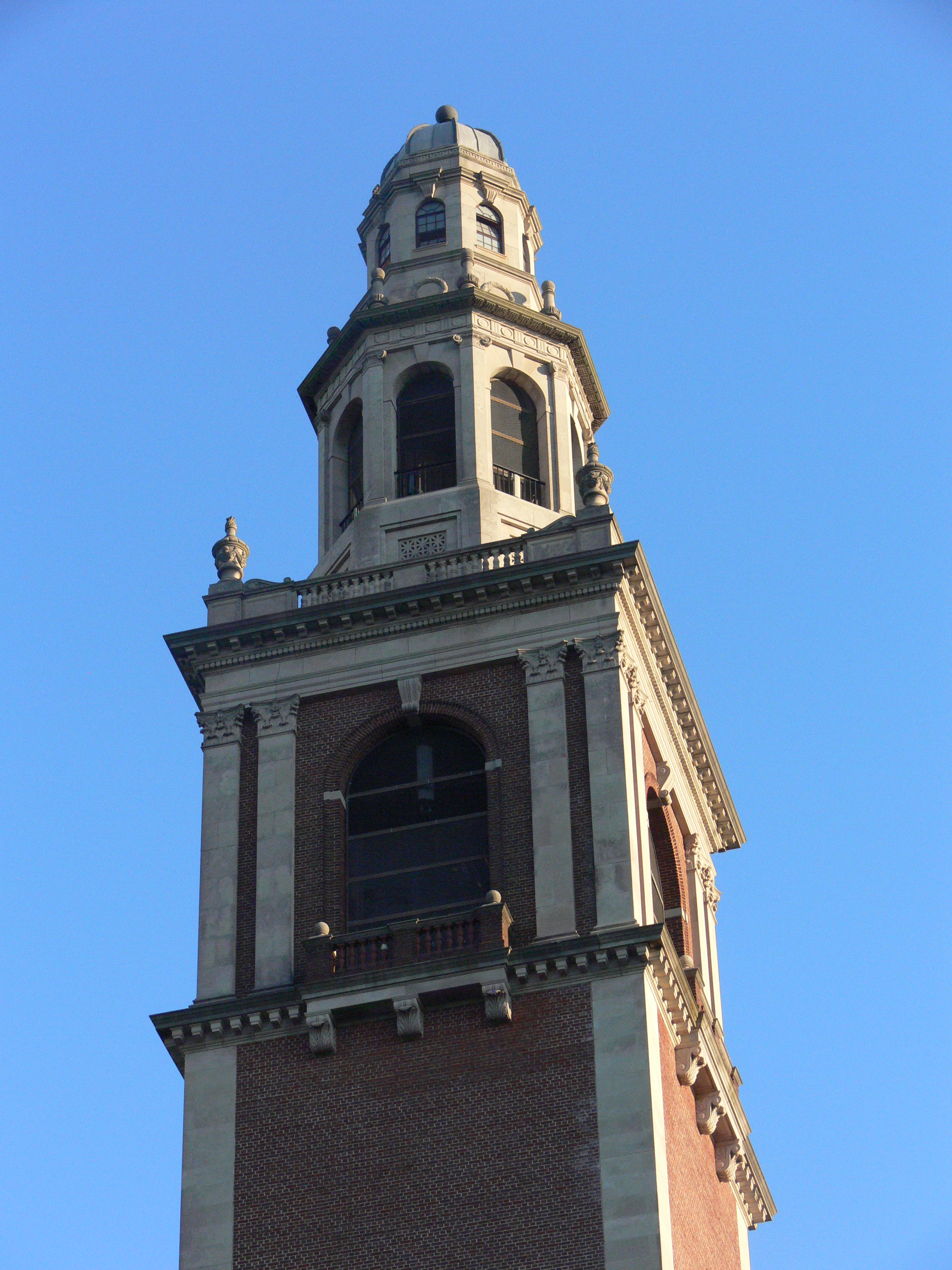
- Virginia War Memorial Carillon
- Location: 1300 Blanton Ave., Richmond, Virginia
- Coordinates: 37°32′27″N 77°29′2″W
- Area: 3 acres (1.2 ha)
- Built: 1928–1932
- Architect: Cram & Ferguson
- Architectural style: Colonial Revival, Georgian Revival
- NRHP reference No.: 84000053
- VLR No.: 127-0387

Significant dates
- Added to NRHP: October 04, 1984
- Designated VLR: August 21, 1984

The World War I Memorial Carillon, built by Cram & Ferguson in 1932, is a memorial to the roughly 3,700 Virginians who died in that war; it contains 56 bells and is 240 feet (73 m) tall. The Carillon is meant to show the patriotism and valor of the soldiers, sailors, marines, and women from Virginia who served in World War 1. The Carillon is played on occasions such as Veterans Day, Memorial Day, and July 4, and is also used for hosting wedding receptions, parties, meetings, and other such gatherings. The carillon was listed on the National Register of Historic Places in 1984.

There was a month long celebration during the monument's opening involved the community as well as the local cadets from schools like VMI and Virginia Tech. A dozen additional bell concerts followed the speeches made by international dignitaries.

A historical marker was established and erected in 2000 by the department of historical resources. The marker states the following: "The Carillon, Virginia's War Memorial for World War I, was erected by the Commonwealth of Virginia to commemorate those who served. Designed by noted Boston architect Ralph Adams Cram, it is an interpretation of the Italian campanile in Georgian classicism. A commission was formed about 1922 to study a design and a site, but public campaigns altered the initial proposal and delayed construction until 1931. The tower was completed and dedicated on 15 October 1932. The Carillon reaches a height of 240 feet and its bells were originally intended to ring out patriotic concerts. The city of Richmond has maintained this structure since its construction."

== Events ==
Cannons used in the 4th of July event

The amphitheatre, Dogwood Dell, has annual summer concert and theatrical events, including a concert by the Richmond Concert Band that concludes with the "1812 Overture", complete with cannon fire, the carillon, and a fireworks display on the 4th of July. Events and shows for children are frequently scheduled at the Ha'Penny Stage just beside the carillon.

In May the park hosts an annual "Arts in the Park" festival, a festive two-day event in which over 400 artists and artisans display and sell their work. The park holds an annual Summer Festival of Arts in June through August which hosts plays, concerts, children events, and other family activities. The Summer Festival of the Arts celebrated its fiftieth season in 2006. The second Saturday in June brings out Richmond's annual "It Starts in Park Festival" which is designed to encourage healthy living and family fun for the summer months just as the school children are getting close to their summer vacations. The carillon is also home to the city's live Christmas Nativity pageant now held (weather permitting) on December 23, after over 60 years of holding it on Christmas Eve.

The park was listed in 2016 on the National Register of Historic Places and the Virginia Landmarks Register.
