= Northern Virginia Criminal Justice Training Academy =

The Northern Virginia Criminal Justice Training Academy is a law enforcement training facility located in Ashburn, Virginia. It serves 17 agencies in Virginia and Washington, D.C., and is accredited by the Commission on Accreditation for Law Enforcement Agencies (CALEA). It offers training for entry-level police officers, sheriff's deputies, and 9-1-1 dispatchers; as well as advanced training for veteran officers in subjects such as identity theft investigations, leadership, and hostage negotiation.

== History ==
The Northern Virginia Criminal Justice Training Academy was established in 1965 as the Northern Virginia Police Academy. In 1971 the Virginia Department of Criminal Justice Services certified the Northern Virginia Police Academy as an approved Training School. The name of the academy was changed to its current name in 1977. In 1993 the Northern Virginia Criminal Justice Training Academy moved from Arlington, Virginia to its present location in Ashburn. The academy was certified by the CALEA in 1995, and re-certified in 1998 and 2001. It was accredited by the CALEA in 2004, and re-accredited in 2007 and 2010. The current executive director is William C. O'Toole.

== Staff ==
The academy staff consists of 17 permanent, non-sworn employees and 18 sworn employees and one non-sworn employee from its member agencies.

== Member agencies ==
Officers from the following seventeen agencies receive their basic training at the academy:

- Alexandria Police Department
- Alexandria Sheriff's Office
- Arlington County Police Department
- Arlington County Sheriff's Office
- City of Fairfax Police Department
- City of Falls Church Police Department
- City of Falls Church Sheriff's Office
- George Mason University Police Department
- Leesburg Police Department
- Loudoun County Sheriff's Office
- Manassas City Police Department
- Manassas Park City Police Department
- Middleburg Police Department
- Northern Virginia Community College Police
- Purcellville Police Department
- Washington Metropolitan Area Transit Police
- Metropolitan Washington Airports Authority Police

== See also ==
- Law enforcement in the United States
- List of law enforcement agencies in Virginia
- Police academy
