= List of law enforcement agencies in Virginia =

This is a list of law enforcement agencies in the state of Virginia.

According to the US Bureau of Justice Statistics' 2008 Census of State and Local Law Enforcement Agencies, the state had 340 law enforcement agencies employing 22,848 sworn police officers, about 293 for each 100,000 residents.

== State agencies ==
- Virginia Alcoholic Beverage Control Authority
- Virginia Department of Agriculture and Consumer Services - Charitable Gaming
- Virginia Department of Corrections
- Virginia Department of Fire Programs - State Fire Marshal's Office
- Virginia Department of Forestry
- Virginia Department of Juvenile Justice
- Virginia Department of Motor Vehicles Law Enforcement Division
- Virginia Department of Wildlife Resources Conservation Police
- Virginia Division of Capitol Police - General Assembly
- Virginia Marine Resources Commission - Virginia Marine Police
- Virginia Office of State Inspector General
- Virginia Port Authority Police
- Virginia State Corporation Commission - Bailiffs
- Virginia State Lottery Security Division
- Virginia State Parks Police
- Virginia State Police

== Special District agencies ==
- Chesapeake Bay Bridge-Tunnel District and Commission Police Department

== County agencies ==
- Accomack County Sheriff's Office
- Albemarle County Police Department
- Albemarle County Sheriff's Office
- Allegheny County Sheriff's Office
- Amelia County Sheriff's Office
- Amherst County Sheriff's Office
- Appomattox County Sheriff's Office
- Arlington County Police Department
- Arlington County Sheriff's Office
- Augusta County Sheriff's Office
- Bath County Sheriff's Office
- Bedford County Sheriff's Office
- Bland County Sheriff's Office
- Botetourt County Sheriff's Office
- Brunswick County Sheriff's Office
- Buchanan County Sheriff's Office
- Buckingham County Sheriff's Office
- Campbell County Sheriff's Office
- Caroline County Sheriff's Office
- Carroll County Sheriff's Office
- Charles City County Sheriff's Office
- Charlotte County Sheriff's Office
- Chesterfield County Police Department
- Chesterfield County Sheriff's Office
- Clarke County Sheriff's Office
- Craig County Sheriff's Office
- Culpeper County Sheriff's Office
- Cumberland County Sheriff's Office
- Dickenson County Sheriff's Office
- Dinwiddie County Sheriff's Office
- Essex County Sheriff's Office
- Fairfax County Police Department
- Fairfax County Sheriff's Office
- Fauquier County Sheriff's Office
- Floyd County Sheriff's Office
- Fluvanna County Sheriff's Office
- Franklin County Sheriff's Office
- Frederick County Sheriff's Office
- Giles County Sheriff's Office
- Gloucester County Sheriff's Office
- Goochland County Sheriff's Office
- Grayson County Sheriff's Office
- Greene County Sheriff's Office
- Greensville County Sheriff's Office
- Halifax County Sheriff's Office
- Hanover County Sheriff's Office
- Henrico County Police Department
- Henrico County Sheriff's Office
- Henry County Sheriff's Office
- Highland County Sheriff's Office
- Isle of Wight County Sheriff's Office
- James City County Police Department
- King and Queen County Sheriff's Office
- King George County Sheriff's Office
- King William County Sheriff's Office
- Lancaster County Sheriff's Office
- Lee County Sheriff's Office
- Loudoun County Sheriff's Office
- Louisa County Sheriff's Office
- Lunenburg County Sheriff's Office
- Madison County Sheriff's Office
- Mathews County Sheriff's Office
- Mecklenburg County Sheriff's Office
- Middlesex County Sheriff's Office
- Montgomery County Sheriff's Office
- Nelson County Sheriff's Office
- New Kent County Sheriff's Office
- Northampton County Sheriff's Office
- Northumberland County Sheriff's Office
- Nottoway County Sheriff's Office
- Orange County Sheriff's Office
- Page County Sheriff's Office
- Patrick County Sheriff's Office
- Pittsylvania County Sheriff's Office
- Powhatan County Sheriff's Office
- Prince Edward County Sheriff's Office
- Prince George County Police Department
- Prince George County Sheriff's Office
- Prince William County Police Department
- Prince William County Sheriff's Office
- Pulaski County Sheriff's Office
- Rappahanock County Sheriff's Office
- Richmond County Sheriff's Office
- Roanoke County Police Department
- Roanoke County Sheriff's Office
- Rockbridge County Sheriff's Office
- Rockingham County Sheriff's Office
- Russell County Sheriff's Office
- Scott County Sheriff's Office
- Shenandoah County Sheriff's Office
- Smyth County Sheriff's Office
- Southampton County Sheriff's Office
- Spotsylvania County Sheriff's Office
- Stafford County Sheriff's Office
- Surry County Sheriff's Office
- Sussex County Sheriff's Office
- Tazewell County Sheriff's Office
- Warren County Sheriff's Office
- Washington County Sheriff's Office
- Westmoreland County Sheriff's Office
- Williamsburg-James City County Sheriff's Office
- Wise County Sheriff's Office
- Wythe County Sheriff's Office
- York-Poquoson Sheriff's Office

== City agencies ==
- Alexandria Sheriff's Office
- Alexandria Police Department
- Bristol Sheriff's Office
- Bristol Police Department
- Buena Vista Sheriff's Office
- Buena Vista Police Department
- Charlottesville Sheriff's Office
- Charlottesville Police Department
- Chesapeake Sheriff's Office
- Chesapeake Police Department
- Colonial Heights Sheriff's Office
- Colonial Heights Police Department
- Covington Division of Police
- Danville Sheriff's Office
- Danville Police Department
- Fairfax Sheriff's Office
- City of Fairfax Police Department
- City of Falls Church Sheriff's Office
- City of Falls Church Police Department
- Franklin Police Department
- Fredericksburg Sheriff's Office
- Fredericksburg Police Department
- Galax Police Department
- Hampton Sheriff's Office
- Hampton Police Department
- Harrisonburg Police Department
- Hopewell Sheriff's Office
- Hopewell Police Department
- Lexington Police Department
- Lynchburg Sheriff's Office
- Lynchburg Police Department
- Manassas Police Department
- Manassas Park Police Department
- Martinsville Sheriff's Office
- Martinsville Police Department
- Newport News Sheriff's Office
- Newport News Police Department
  - Newport News Park Rangers
- Norfolk Sheriff's Office
- Norfolk Police Department
- Norton Sheriff's Office
- Norton Police Department
- Petersburg Sheriff's Office
- Petersburg Bureau of Police
- Poquoson Police Department
- Portsmouth Sheriff's Office
- Portsmouth Police Department
- Radford Sheriff's Office
- Radford Police Department
- Richmond Sheriff's Office
- Richmond Police Department
- Roanoke City Sheriff's Office
- Roanoke Police Department
- Salem Sheriff's Office
- Salem Police Department
- Staunton Sheriff's Office
- Staunton Police Department
- Suffolk Sheriff's Office
- Suffolk Police Department
- Virginia Beach Police Department
- Virginia Beach Sheriff's Office
- Waynesboro Sheriff's Office
- Waynesboro Police Department
- Williamsburg Police Department
- Winchester Sheriff's Office
- Winchester Police Department

== Town agencies ==
Town agencies include:

- Abingdon Police Department
- Alberta Police Department
- Altavista Police Department
- Amherst Police Department
- Appalachia Police Department
- Ashland Police Department
- Bedford Police Department
- Berryville Police Department
- Big Stone Gap Police Department
- Blackstone Police Department
- Bluefield Police Department
- Boones Mill Police Department
- Bowling Green Police Department
- Blacksburg Police Department
- Boydton Police Department
- Boykins Police Department
- Bridgewater Police Department
- Broadway Police Department
- Brodnax Police Department
- Brookneal Police Department
- Burkeville Police Department
- Cape Charles Police Department
- Cedar Bluff Police Department
- Chase City Police Department
- Chatham Police Department
- Chilhowie Police Department
- Chincoteague Police Department
- Christiansburg Police Department
- Clarksville Police Department
- Clifton Forge Police Department
- Clinchco Police Department
- Clintwood Police Department
- Coeburn Police Department
- Colonial Beach Police Department
- Courtland Police Department
- Craigsville Police Department
- Crewe Police Department
- Culpeper Police Department
- Damascus Police Department
- Dayton Police Department
- Drakes Branch Police Department
- Dublin Police Department
- Dumfries Police Department
- Eastville Police Department
- Elkton Police Department
- Emporia Police Department
- Exmore Police Department
- Farmville Police Department
- Front Royal Police Department
- Gate City Police Department
- Glade Spring Police Department
- Glasgow Police Department
- Gordonsville Police Department
- Gretna Police Department
- Grottoes Police Department
- Grundy Police Department
- Halifax Police Department
- Hallwood Police Department
- Haymarket Police Department
- Haysi Police Department
- Herndon Police Department
- Hillsville Police Department
- Hurt Police Department
- Independence Police Department
- Jonesville Police Department
- Kenbridge Police Department
- Kilmarnock Police Department
- La Crosse Police Department
- Lawrenceville Police Department
- Lebanon Police Department
- Leesburg Police Department
- Louisa Police Department
- Luray Police Department
- Marion Police Department
- McKenney Police Department
- Middleburg Police Department
- Middletown Police Department
- Mount Jackson Police Department
- New Market Police Department
- Newsoms Police Department
- Narrows Police Department
- Occoquan Police Department
- Onancock Police Department
- Onley Police Department
- Orange Police Department
- Parksley Police Department
- Pearisburg Police Department
- Pembroke Police Department
- Pennington Gap Police Department
- Pocahontas Police Department
- Pound Police Department - disbanded in 2021, re-established 2022
- Pulaski Police Department
- Purcellville Police Department
- Quantico Police Department
- Remington Police Department
- Rich Creek Police Department
- Richlands Police Department
- Rocky Mount Police Department
- Rural Retreat Police Department
- Saltville Police Department
- Scottsville Police Department
- Shenandoah Police Department
- Smithfield Police Department
- South Boston Police Department
- South Hill Police Department
- Stanley Police Department
- St. Paul Police Department
- Stephens City Police Department
- Strasburg Police Department
- Tangier Island Police Department
- Tappahannock Police Department
- Tazewell Police Department
- Timberville Police Department
- Victoria Police Department
- Vienna Police Department
- Vinton Police Department
- Warrenton Police Department
- Warsaw Police Department
- Weber City Police Department
- West Point Police Department
- White Stone Police Department
- Windsor Police Department
- Wise Police Department
- Woodstock Police Department
- Wytheville Police Department

== Airport agencies ==
- Charlottesville-Albemarle Airport Department of Public Safety
- Lynchburg Regional Airport Police Department
- Metropolitan Washington Airports Authority Police Department
- Norfolk International Airport Police Department
- Peninsula Airport Commission Police Department (Newport News/Williamsburg International)
- Richmond International Airport Police Department
- Roanoke-Blacksburg Regional Airport Public Safety Department

== University/college police agencies ==
- Blue Ridge Community College Public Safety Department
- Bridgewater College Police and Safety Department
- Central Virginia Community College Department of Public Safety and Police
- Christopher Newport University Police Department
- College of William and Mary Police Department
- Emory and Henry University Campus Police and Security Department
- Ferrum College Police Department
- George Mason University Department of Police and Public Safety
- Germanna Community College Police Department
- Hampden-Sydney College Department of Security and Police
- Hampton University Police Department
- J. Sargeant Reynolds Community College Police Department
- James Madison University Department of Public Safety
- Liberty University Police Department
- Longwood University Police Department
- Laurel Ridge Community College Campus Police and Security Department
- Mountain Empire Community College Police Department
- Norfolk State University Police Department
- Northern Virginia Community College Police Department
- Old Dominion University Police Department
- Patrick & Henry Community College Police Department
- Piedmont Virginia Community College Department of Public Safety and Police Department
- Radford University Police Department
- Regent University Police Department
- Richard Bland College of William and Mary Police Department
- Southwest Virginia Community College Police Department
- University of Mary Washington Police Department
- University of Richmond Police Department
- University of Virginia Police Department
- University of Virginia's College at Wise Police Department
- Virginia Commonwealth University Police Department
- Virginia Highlands Community College Police Department
- Virginia Military Institute Police Department
- Virginia Peninsula Community College Police Department
- Virginia School for the Deaf and the Blind Office of Public Safety
- Virginia State University Department of Police and Public Safety
- Virginia Tech Police Department
- Virginia Union University Police Department
- Virginia Western Community College Police Department
- Wytheville Community College Police Department

== Private police departments ==
- Aquia Harbour Police Department
- Bridgewater Airpark Police Department
- BWXT Police Department
- Carilion Clinic Police and Security Services Department
- Kings Dominion Park Police Department
- Kingsmill Police Department
- Lake Monticello Police Department
- Wintergreen Police Department

Per Virginia Code 9.1-101, which provides that any DCJS recognized Private Police Departments in existence as of January 1, 2013, shall remain authorized Virginia Private Police Departments. In section 3 of the code it lists as follows:

"3. That, for the purposes of this act, the following private police departments were in existence on January 1, 2013, and were recognized as private police departments by the Department of Criminal Justice Services at that time: Aquia Harbor Police Department, the Babcock and Wilcox Police Department, the Bridgewater Airpark Police Department, the Carilion Police and Security Services Department, the Kings Dominion Park Police Department, the Kingsmill Police Department, the Lake Monticello Police Department, the Massanutten Police Department, and the Wintergreen Police Department."

== Federal Law Enforcement ==
- Department of Defense Police
- Defense Logistics Agency Police (Fort Belvoir and Richmond)
- Federal Bureau of Investigation
- Federal Bureau of Investigation Police Department (Quantico)
- Federal Protective Service
- Fort Barfoot
- Fort Belvoir
- Fort Eustis
- Fort Gregg-Adams
- Fort Meade
- Fort Walker
- Internal Revenue Service - Criminal Investigation
- Joint Base Myer-Henderson Hall
- Joint Expeditionary Base Little Creek
- Langley Air Force Base
- Mount Weather (FEMA) Police
- NASA Langley Research Center
- Naval Air Station Oceana
- Naval Amphibious Base Little Creek
- Naval Station Norfolk
- Naval Surface Warfare Center Dahlgren
- Naval Weapons Station Yorktown
- Norfolk Naval Shipyard
- Office of the United States Marshal for the Eastern District of Virginia
- Office of the United States Marshal for the Western District of Virginia
- Surface Combat Systems Center Wallops Island
- US Customs and Border Protection
- US Department of Veterans Affairs Police Richmond, Hampton and Salem Virginia
- United States Drug Enforcement Administration
- United States Park Police
- National Park Service (Law Enforcement-Ranger)
- United States Pentagon Police
- United States Postal Inspection Service
- U.S. Probation and Pretrial Services System
- United States Secret Service

== Railroad Police ==
- Amtrak Police Department
- CSX Railroad Police Department
- Metro Transit Police Department
- Norfolk Southern Railroad Police Department

== Defunct law enforcement agencies ==
- Appomattox Police Department
- Bassett Police Department
- Buchanan Police Department
- Castlewood Police Department
- Central State Hospital Public Safety - Police & Fire - Converted to Security in 2015 by order of DCJS and DBHDS
- Clover Police Department
- Dorchester Police Department
- DuPont Police Department
- Eastern State Hospital Police - Converted to Security in 2015 by order of DCJS and DBHDS
- Eastern Virginia Medical School Police and Public Safety Department - Merged with Old Dominion University Police
- Edinburg Police Department - Absorbed by Shenandoah County Sheriff's Office 7/2015
- Floyd Police Department
- Fries Police Department
- Glyn Lyn Police Department
- Honaker Police Department - Disbanded in 2024
- Iron Gate Police Department
- Irvington Police Department
- Massanutten Police Department - Disbanded in 2020
- Montross Police Department
- Nansemond County Police Department
- Nansemond County Sheriff's Office
- New Castle Police Department
- Norfolk County Police Department
- Norfolk County Sheriff's Office
- Osaka Police Department
- Portsmouth Marine Terminal Police - Merged into the VPAP in the 1970s
- Princess Anne County Police Department
- Richmond Redevelopment and Housing Authority Police Department
- Saint Paul's College Police Department
- South Norfolk Police Department
- Southwestern Virginia Mental Health Institute Police - Converted to Security in 2015 by order of DCJS and DBHDS
- Stonega Police Department
- Toms Creek Police Department
- Urbanna Police Department
- Virginia Defense Force Military Police Company - Dissolved in major force-wide reorganization in fall 2013
- Virginia Department of Prohibition Enforcement - Absorbed by Virginia Department of Alcoholic Beverage Control
- Wakefield Police Department
- Waverly Police Department - Police Services Agreement with Sussex County Sheriff's Office effective May 1, 2021
- Wilson Workforce and Rehabilitation Center Police Department - Converted to Security in June 2025 by order of VA DARS
