= List of killings by law enforcement officers in the United States, December 2015 =

This is a list of people reported killed by non-military law enforcement officers in the United States in December 2015, whether in the line of duty or not, and regardless of reason or method. The listing documents the occurrence of a death, making no implications regarding wrongdoing or justification on the part of the person killed or officer involved. Killings are arranged by date of the incident that caused death. Different death dates, if known, are noted in the description. The table below lists 103 people.

== December 2015 ==
Date	Name (age) of deceased	Race	State (city)	Description
2015-12-31	Keith Childress Jr. (23)	Black	Nevada (Las Vegas)	Childress, a suspect in an attempted murder, was confronted by police in a residential neighborhood. He had a cell phone in one hand, which police on scene said they believed was a firearm. They opened fire on him.
2015-12-30	John Randell Veach (39)	Unknown race	Wyoming (Rawlins)	A man was shot by police outside a Kum & Go gas station.
2015-12-30	Fred Perez (55)	Hispanic	California (Fresno)	Police responded to several 911 calls reporting a man beating a woman at a Fresno motel near N. Weber and N. Thorne Avenues. Upon arrival the officers saw a man stabbing a woman. They entered the room and fired a bean bag at him, but he continued stabbing the woman. They fired their weapons striking the man who died a few hours later. The woman who had suffered at least 12 stab wounds was in stable condition at a local hospital.
2015-12-29	Tien Hua (33)	Asian	California (Rosemead)	Hua, a suspect in a Hollywood Hills murder, was shot and killed after a six-hour SWAT stand-off at his home.
2015-12-29	Paul Testa (44)	White	Florida (Jacksonville)	
2015-12-29	Siolosega Velega-Nuufolau (50)	Native Hawaiian or Pacific Islander	California (Santa Nella)	Someone called 911 because Velega-Nuufolau was in the neighbor's driveway, screaming for someone to call 911. When the Sheriffs deputy arrived, Velega-Nuufolau, holding a knife, charged at the deputy. He shot her and she died at the scene. A Sheriffs office spokesman said that Velega-Nuufolau had a history of mental problems and run-ins with the officers.
2015-12-28	Corey Achstein (28)	White	Virginia (Suffolk)	Suffolk Police received multiple calls at around 5:15 p.m. about an armed individual chasing someone. According to police, Achstein was threatening to kill three juveniles while pointing a gun at them. Police said in a press release, "Based upon actions of the suspect and concern for safety, an officer fired one shot striking the suspect. A handgun was recovered in close proximity to the suspect. The investigation has revealed that the gun was actually a realistic style pneumatic bb gun."
2015-12-28	Román, Frank (49)	Hispanic	Puerto Rico (Ponce)	Police officer Guarionex Candelario shot and killed three of his colleagues after a hostage situation.
2015-12-28	Soto Segarra, Luz M. (49)	Hispanic	Puerto Rico (Ponce)	Police officer Guarionex Candelario shot and killed three of his colleagues after a hostage situation.
2015-12-28	Hernández de Hoyos, Rosario (42)	Hispanic	Puerto Rico (Ponce)	Police officer Guarionex Candelario shot and killed three of his colleagues after a hostage situation.
2015-12-27	Gayneaux Paul Trahan (52)	White	Franklin, LA	
2015-12-27	Michael Parker (36)	White	Lucedale, MS	
2015-12-27	Sean Mould (34)	White	Arizona (Tempe)	
2015-12-26	Quintonio Legrier (19)	Black	Illinois (Chicago)	After he was threatened by his teenage son with an aluminum bat, the father called police in the early hours of Boxing Day. The Northern Illinois University student was fatally shot in the house together with a downstairs neighbor around 4:25 a.m. while charging at entering police officers.
2015-12-26	Gilberto Heredia (38)	Hispanic	Homedale, ID	
2015-12-26	Bettie Jones (55)	Black	Illinois (Chicago)	Mrs. Jones was accidentally shot by a law enforcement officer after opening the entrance door for the police at the request of her upstairs neighbor Antonio LeGrier.
2015-12-26	Lonnie Niesen (41)	White	Arizona (Phoenix)	After striking a police car with a heavy object, Niesen threw objects, believed to be rocks or bricks, at the police precinct, shattering the front glass to the lobby. Niesen then walked away, still clutching the objects. When the officers approached him, he refused to stop, drop the objects or obey any police commands. He then turned toward two officers and attempted to hit one in the head with the object, hitting the officer's hand. That officer returned by shooting one time with his gun, striking the suspect.
2015-12-25	William David Raff (31)	White	California (Palo Alto)	A man armed with a knife was shot by police outside a mental health clinic in downtown Palo Alto.
2015-12-24	Daquan Antonio Westbrook (18)	Black	North Carolina (Charlotte)	At Northlake Mall, a man armed with a firearm shot another man during an altercation. An off-duty police officer who was working for mall security shot dead the alleged gunman.
2015-12-24	Schuylar Gunning (36)	White	Winnsboro, LA	
2015-12-24	Terrozza Tyree Griffin (24)	Black	Lansing, MI	
2015-12-24	Gregory Sanders (54)	Unknown race	Pride, LA	
2015-12-24	Omar Ventura (23)	Hispanic	California (Porterville)	Police were interviewing a woman at the scene of a domestic disturbance when the suspect (Omar Ventura), armed with a knife, returned. He advanced toward the woman, not dropping the knife as the officers ordered. One of the officers fired, killing Ventura.
2015-12-23	Kevin Matthews (35)	Black	Dearborn, MI	
2015-12-22	Jose Rodriguez (19)	Hispanic	New Mexico (Albuquerque)	
2015-12-22	Michael Hilber (29)	White	Brooksville, FL	
2015-12-22	Charles Reynolds (61)	White	Ludlow, KY	
2015-12-22	Kenneth Stephens (56)	White	Burlington, VT	
2015-12-21	Brandon Barsnick (30)	White	California (Smartsville)	A regional SWAT team from Yuba County Sheriffs Department and Marysville Police Department went to Barsnick's home to serve a warrant and found him sitting outside the home, holding a rifle. When he pointed the rifle at the officers they shot and killed him.
2015-12-21	Robert Teter (39)	White	Deltona, FL	
2015-12-21	Bobby Daniels (48)	Black	Douglasville, GA	
2015-12-21	Michael Noel (32)	Black	St Martinville, LA	
2015-12-21	Chan Leith (25)	Black	Denver, CO	
2015-12-21	Derek DeGroat (21)	White	Canaan Township, PA	
2015-12-21	Alfredo Barrientos (47)	Hispanic	Laredo, TX	
2015-12-21	Guadalupe Quiroz (34)	Hispanic	California (Hemet)	Hemet Police officers responded to an early-morning call about a man waving a gun in a mobile home park. When they arrived about 3 a.m. and confronted the man, he brandished the gun so they shot and killed him.
2015-12-20	Jeffrey Hiltz (35)	White	Danvers, NH	
2015-12-20	Mark Ramirez (31)	Hispanic	Amarillo, TX	
2015-12-20	Lionel Waters (35)	Black	Harrington, DE	
2015-12-20	Leroy Browning (30)	Black	California (Palmdale)	Los Angeles County Sheriffs Deputies were investigating an accident where an apparently drunken man had crashed into a fast food restaurant. They had placed the DUI suspect in the back of a patrol car. When they attempted to place him in handcuffs and arrest him he fought the deputies. A Sheriffs' Department spokesperson said he attempted to grab a deputy's gun and another deputy shot and killed him.
2015-12-19	Ruben Herrera (26)	Hispanic	California (Torrance)	Herrera had been injured during his arrest for vandalism and was taken for treatment to Harbor-UCLA Medical Center. He was treated without incident and handcuffed to a gurney. When the handcuffs were briefly taken off he picked up a chair and swung it as a weapon. In the struggle he reached for the officer's weapon. The officer then shot and killed him.
2015-12-19	Trevon Scruggs (24)	Black	Concord, VA	
2015-12-19	Nelson, Roy (42)		California (Hayward)	Hayward Police responded about 1:00 am to a request for an emergency mental health evaluation. They put Roy Nelson in the back seat of their car and during the drive to the hospital he began to kick at the back window. They stopped to place him in a leg restraint. The police say he suffered a "medical emergency." Emergency services were called but were unable to revive him. He was pronounced dead at a hospital.
2015-12-18	Erica Lauro (22)	White	Northwood, OH	
2015-12-18	Amos Frerichs (32)	White	Knoxville, TN	
2015-12-18	Edel Moreland (32)	White	Linthicum Heights, MD	
2015-12-18	Robert L. Martinez (58)	Hispanic	Taos, NM	
2015-12-17	Douglas Yon (25)	White	Kent, OH	
2015-12-17	Christopher Fletcher (24)	White	California (Modesto)	Modesto police attempted to stop Fletcher who was riding his bike on a sidewalk about 2:10 p.m. They followed him into a parking garage and saw that he was carrying a weapon. When he failed to drop his weapon as ordered, the two officers fired several shots, mortally wounding Fletcher. He died at a local hospital. Police say he was on probation.
2015-12-16	Bryant Duncan (23)	White	California (Camarillo)	Duncan took a cordless telephone from a convenience store and called 911 to report that a crime was about to take place. When an officer from the Ventura County Sheriffs Department arrived Duncan, holding a knife, walked toward the officer and told the officer to kill him. As Duncan approached, the officer fired several shots, killing him.
2015-12-15	Ronnie Dubose Carr (51)	Black	Dallas, NC	
2015-12-15	Shun Ma (64)	Asian	Seattle, WA	
2015-12-14	Mark Toney (33)	White	West Virginia (Mount Hope)	Law enforcement were dispatched to a home in response to an intoxicated man with a knife. When Mount Hope Police officers first arrived on scene, the man was allegedly carrying a shotgun in the front yard. When police asked the suspect to drop his weapon, he pointed the firearm in the direction of oncoming officers. Mount Hope Police responded to firing several shots at the man. He was pronounced dead on the scene.
2015-12-14	Brenda Dean Kimberling (48)	White	Las Vegas, NV	
2015-12-14	Calvin McKinnis (33)	Black	New Orleans, LA	
2015-12-14	Roberto Ortiz Sanchez (45)	Hispanic	Las Vegas, NV	
2015-12-14	Jeffrey Evans (52)	White	Middle River, MD	
2015-12-14	Michael Thomason (56)	White	Milan, TN	
2015-12-14	Mharloun Verdejo Saycon (39)	Asian	California (Long Beach)	Long Beach Police were called to a business because a man was waving a knife around and customers were afraid. When officers arrived Saycon was seated, still holding the knife. When he did not obey officers' orders to drop the knife they used their "electronic devices" and then batons to try to subdue him. During the struggle police shot and killed Saycon. The family, in their legal claim filed later, say that he had been diagnosed with bipolar schizophrenia.
2015-12-14	Hector Alvarez (19)	Hispanic	California (Gilroy)	Gilroy Police officers were directed to a domestic disturbance call. When officers arrived at the carport area, Alvarez confronted one of them charging at the officer. One of the officers shot and killed Alvarez. The shooting occurred within ninety seconds of the officer's arrival.
2015-12-13	Ryan McMillan (21)	White	Denton, TX	
2015-12-13	Shirley Weis (51)	White	Arlington, TX	
2015-12-13	Enrique Gonzalez (32)	Hispanic	Denver, CO	
2015-12-13	Feagaiga Tausaga "Nephi" Leiataua (30)	Native Hawaiian or Pacific Islander	Lacey, Washington	Deputies responded to reports of a victim with multiple stab wounds saying he'd been attacked by his cousin, Leiataua, who was now holding a 3-year-old hostage with a knife. After a three hour standoff, a police sharp shooter killed Leiataua, "due to imminent concern" for the safety of the child.
2015-12-12	Nicholas Robertson (28)	Black	California (Lynwood)	Multiple 911 calls reported a man firing a gun in the air while walking through a residential area. Los Angeles County Sheriff's deputies confronted Robertson in front of a gas station. They shot him 33 times after he refused to drop the gun.
2015-12-12	Roy Carreon (49)	Hispanic	California (San Bernardino)	San Bernardino Police officers were flagged down for a disturbance and saw Carreron in an apartment holding a woman and threatening her with a knife. The woman got away but Carreron did not follow officers' order to drop the knife. The police shot four or five times, striking Carreron who later died at a hospital.
2015-12-12	Jonathan Wardlow (36)	White	Healdton, OK	
2015-12-12	Javario Shante Eagle (24)	Black	Chattanooga, TN	
2015-12-12	Efrain Villanueva	Unknown race	Aurora, CO	
2015-12-12	Andrew Joseph Todd (20)	White	Pennsylvania (East Stroudsburg)	Todd was reportedly suicidal, and was brandishing two firearms and a machete at customers inside a Wal-Mart. Police ordered him to drop it, and then opened fire on Todd.
2015-12-12	Christopher Goodlow (25)	Black	Indiana (Indianapolis)	
2015-12-11	Steven Wickert (36)	White	Arizona (Tucson)	
2015-12-10	Thomas Gendreau Jr (54)	White	California (Marina)	When a woman called 911 to report her husband was attacking her, Marina Police officers responded. When they arrived Thomas Gendereau continued to stab his wife. One officer shot Genderau. Both Genderau and his wife were taken to a hospital, where both died.
2015-12-10	Name Withheld	Unknown	California (Hemet)	Hemet Police officers shot and killed a man whom they report was agitated and brandishing a handgun. They also say he was wanted on a felony warrant. They withheld his name.
2015-12-10	Charles Edward Rosemond Sr (55)	Black	Taylors, SC	
2015-12-10	Jason Bryant (34)	White	Indiana (Indianapolis)	
2015-12-09	Christopher Higdon (66)	White	Leitchfield, KY	
2015-12-09	Sammy Echols (51)	White	Sportsmen Acres, OK	
2015-12-09	Dimitrie L. Penny (32)	Black	Tallahassee, FL	
2015-12-08	James Paul Bertuglia (40)	White	Amherst, VA	
2015-12-08	Derek Stokes (33)	Black	Ohio (Cleveland)	
2015-12-08	Miguel Espinal (36)	Black	Yonkers, NY	
2015-12-07	Devon Holder (30)	Black	New York (New York)	
2015-12-06	Raymond Azevedo (35)	White	Seattle, Washington	Employees at a downtown coffee shop reported seeing a man with a gun to police. The man, Azevedo, fled, carjacking a series of vehicles and firing at police as they pursued him. Azevedo was shot dead after aiming his car at officers.
2015-12-06	Carlumandarlo Zaramo (46)	Black	Richmond Heights, OH	
2015-12-06	John Britton (48)	White	Laramie, WY	
2015-12-05	Colten Marcellus (24)	White	Irving, TX	
2015-12-05	David Winesett (51)	White	Miami Beach, FL	
2015-12-05	Michael Funk (60)	White	Neenah, WI	
2015-12-05	Sheilah Huck (61)	White	Florissant, MO	
2015-12-05	Juan Perez (38)	Hispanic	California (Indio)	An Indio Police officer investigating a theft of a golf cart encountered a suspect matching the description given. The officer attempted to apprehend the suspect who was armed, and shots were exchanged. Juan Perez was killed.
2015-12-04	Raymone Davis (21)	Black	Pennsylvania (Pittsburgh)	
2015-12-04	Jason Brady (40)	White	Waverly, OH	
2015-12-04	Ivan Krstic (47)	White	Arizona (Mesa)	
2015-12-03	Neil Stretesky (66)	White	Big Springs, NE	
2015-12-02	Farook, Syed Rizwan (28)	Asian	California (San Bernardino)	After committing a terrorist attack during a staff meeting at the Inland Regional Center around 11.00 am together with his wife, both were stopped in their black Ford Expedition SUV after a tip off around 4 hours later on East San Bernardino Avenue and killed in a shootout with law enforcement officers.
2015-12-02	Malik, Tashfeen (29)	Asian	California (San Bernardino)	Committed together with her husband the San Bernardino terrorist attack and was killed together with him about four hours later.
2015-12-02	Allen Pacheco (32)	Hispanic	San Antonio, TX	
2015-12-02	Mario Woods (26)	Black	California (San Francisco)	Woods, a suspect in the stabbing and wounding of a man the same day, was allegedly armed with a kitchen knife while he was confronted by at least five police officers in Bayview-Hunters Point. A video captured by a bystander showed Woods having his arms towards his sides and slowly walking towards one officer and away from four other officers. One officer stepped towards Woods, and opened fire. At least fifteen shots were fired by the officers.
2015-12-02	Phillip Munoz (35)	Hispanic	Denver, CO	
2015-12-02	Florencio Lucero (36)	Hispanic	Deming, NM	
2015-12-01	John Anthony Gonzalez (18)	Hispanic	California (Norwalk)	Gonzalez and another man were stopped as pedestrians by deputies from the Los Angeles County Sheriffs Department working with the Department's "Safe Streets" program. As the two deputies approached, one man drew and dropped a weapon; Gonzalez pointed his weapon at the deputies. The deputies shot and killed Gonzalez. The other man was arrested. A sheriffs department spokesman said both men were gang members.
2015-12-01	Joshua Jozefowicz (23)	White	Bangor, ME	

== See also ==
- Death in custody § United States
- Henry A. Wallace Police Crime Public Database
- List of cases of police brutality
- List of countries with annual rates and counts for killings by law enforcement officers
- List of law enforcement officers killed in the line of duty in the United States
- List of law enforcement officers convicted for an on-duty killing in the United States
- List of shootings by US immigration agents
- List of police reforms related to the George Floyd protests
- List of unarmed African Americans killed by law enforcement officers in the United States
- Lists of killings by law enforcement officers
- Police brutality in the United States
- Police misconduct § United States
- Police riot § United States
- Police use of deadly force in the United States
