= Alexandria Police Department =

Law enforcement agency in Alexandria, VA, United States

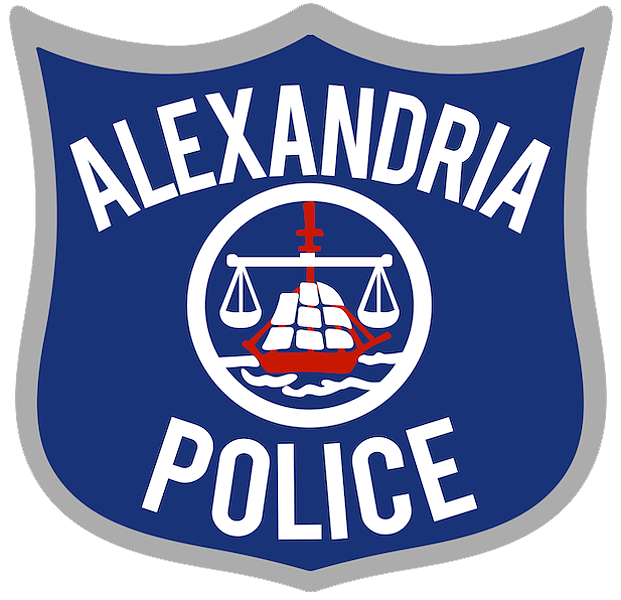
- Common name: Alexandria Police
- Abbreviation: APD

Agency overview
- Formed: 1870
- Superseding agency: City of Alexandria, Virginia
- Employees: 475
- Volunteers: 80
- Annual budget: $63.66 million

Jurisdictional structure
- Operations jurisdiction: Alexandria, Virginia, U.S.
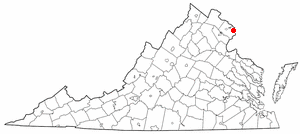
- Map of Alexandria Police Department's jurisdiction
- Area: 15.4 square miles (40 km^{2})
- Population: 155,810
- Legal jurisdiction: Alexandria, Virginia
- Governing body: City
- General nature: Local civilian police

Operational structure
- Headquarters: Alexandria, Virginia
- Police Officers: 323
- Civilian employees: 152
- Agency executive: Tarrick Mcguire, Chief of Police

Website
- alexandriava.gov/police

The Alexandria Police Department (APD) is the primary law enforcement agency servicing 155,810 people within 15.4 square miles (40 km^{2}) of jurisdiction within Alexandria, Virginia. The APD has been internationally accredited by the Commission on Accreditation for Law Enforcement Agencies (CALEA) since 1986 (38 consecutive years as of 2024). The APD has 323 sworn officers and 152 civilian employees. New officers are trained at the Northern Virginia Criminal Justice Training Academy.

City of Alexandria police officers have jurisdiction of Virginian crimes and crimes legislated by the City of Alexandria local government. Physical jurisdiction extends one mile into neighboring jurisdictions of Arlington County and Fairfax County.

== History ==
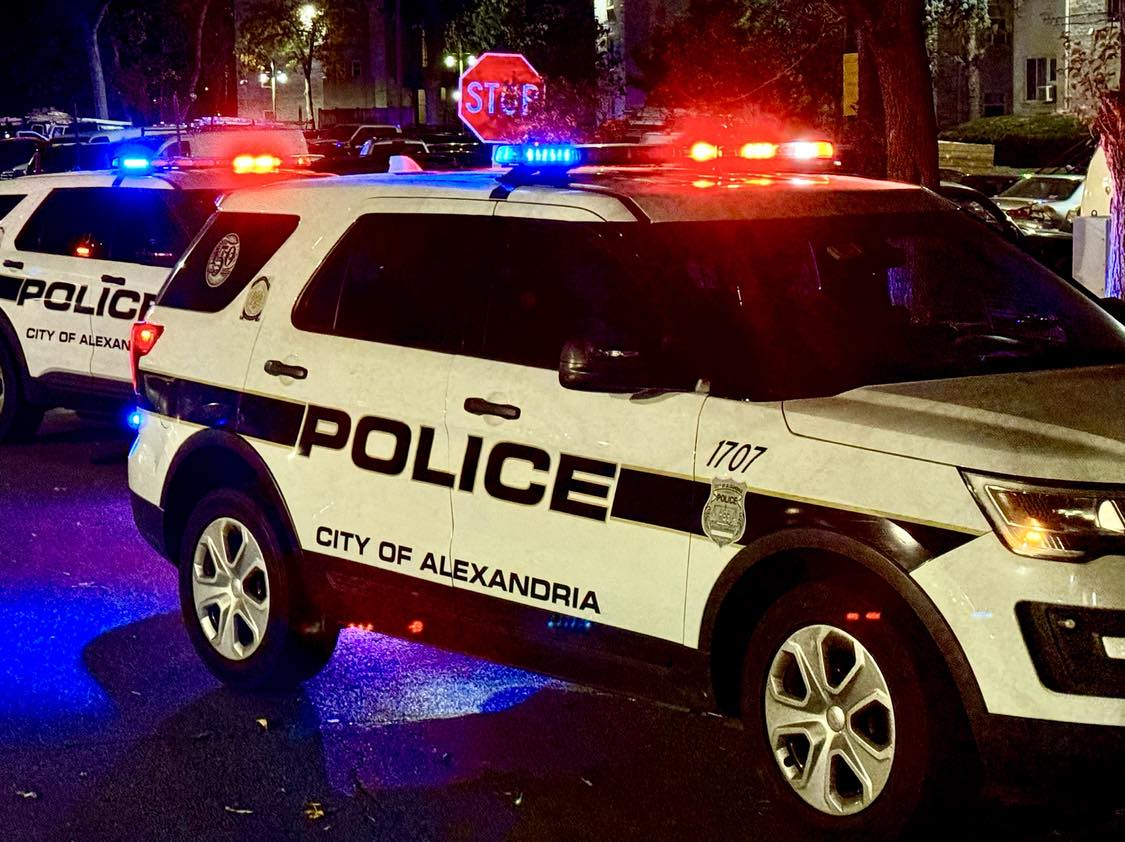
An Alexandria police cruiser

Night watchmen and constables were employed by the city since 1797 with the starting pay of $150 annually.

The Alexandria Police Department was founded on July 15, 1870. In 1918, the Alexandria Police Department founded the Motor Unit with the purchase of one Harley-Davidson motorcycle for use in answering emergency calls.

In 2009, then Deputy Chief Earl L. Cook became the first African-American Chief of Police in Alexandria replacing Chief David P. Baker.

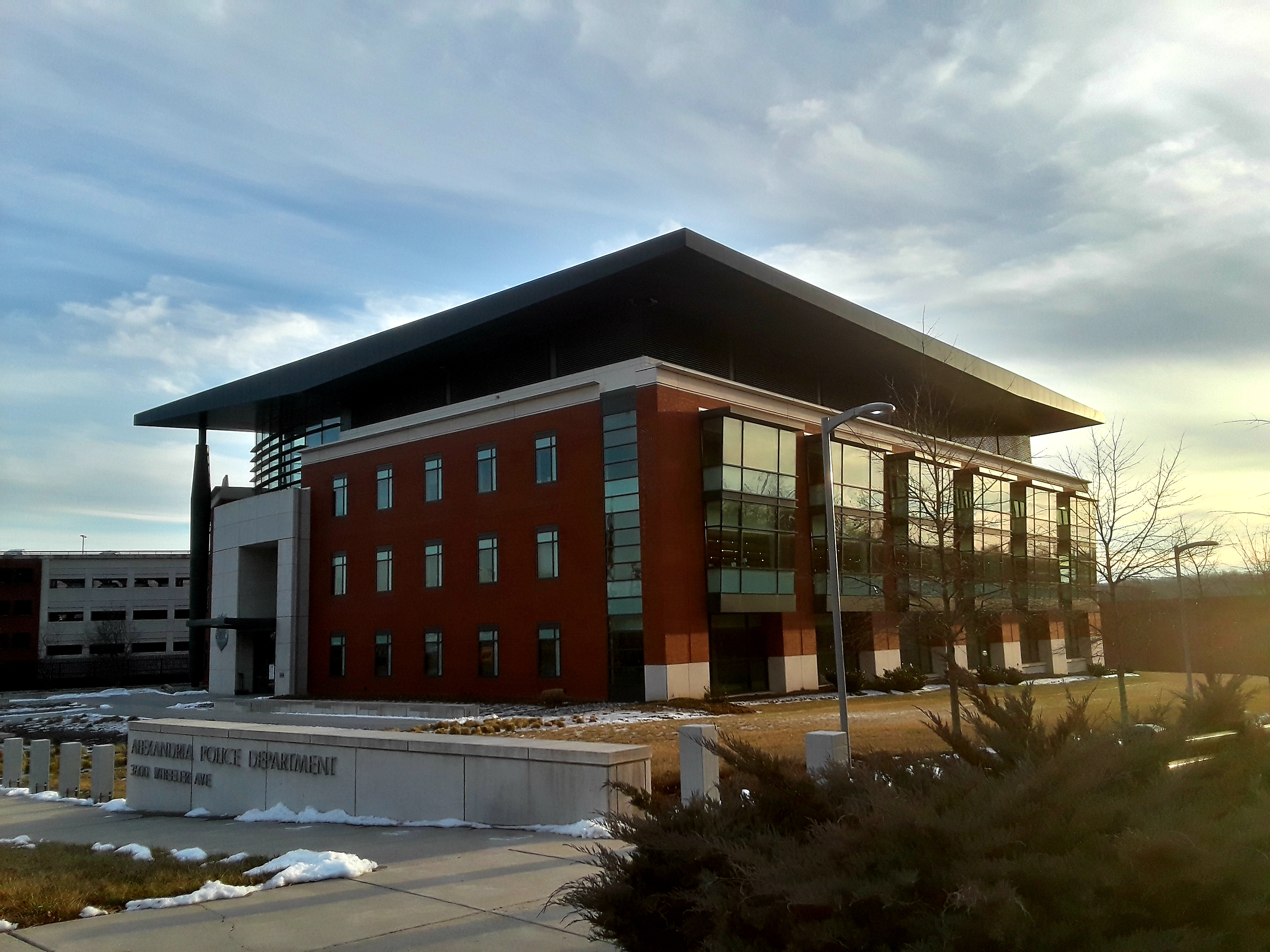
Headquarters of the Alexandria Police Department

In November 2011, construction was completed on their current headquarters in the West End section of Alexandria, on Wheeler Avenue immediately south of Duke Street.

On October 1, 2016, Chief Earl Cook retired after 37 years and Deputy Chief David Huchler was appointed Interim Chief of Police while the IACP searched for a replacement. On January 16 Michael L. Brown, former Chief of Police for the California Highway Patrol was announced as the successor to Earl Cook.

In June 2021, Chief Michael Brown retired and Asst. Chief Don Hayes was named Acting Chief. Acting Chief Don Hayes was appointed Chief in April 2022.

In December 2021, the police department reported having trouble hiring and retaining staff and officers due to pay being not competitive with other nearby police agencies.

In February 2024, Chief Don Hayes was tapped for a federal assignment. Raul Pedroso was named Interim chief of police.

On December 10, The City of Alexandria's new Police Chief, Tarrick McGuire was officially sworn in. McGuire comes from the Arlington, Texas Police Department where he served as Assistant Chief of Police.

== Organization ==
=== Field Operations Bureau ===
The Field Operations Bureau is responsible for patrolling neighborhoods and responding to 9-1-1 calls. They also provide traffic enforcement and conduct preliminary investigations of crimes.

Patrol Sectors:

- Patrol Sector 1 - Old Town
- Patrol Sector 2 - Del Ray/Arlandria
- Patrol Sector 3 - West End

Patrol Support

- Community Oriented Policing Section (COPS)
- Special Operations Team (SOT)
- K-9
- Motors
- Traffic Safety Section (TSS)
- School Resource Officers (SRO)
- Parking Enforcement
- School Crossing Guards
- Hack Inspector
- Office of Homeland Security and Operational Preparedness (HS/OP)

=== Investigative Services Bureau ===
The Investigations Bureau investigates crimes and officer misconduct. The bureau consists of 45 detectives and civilian employees. Sections:

- Criminal Investigation Section
- Crime Scene Investigation Section
- Vice Narcotics Section
- Media Services Unit
- Internal Investigations

=== Administrative Services Bureau ===
The Administrative Services Bureau includes the following division and units:

Human Resources, Recruitment & Training Division

Support Services Division

- Fleet Management
- Facilities and Security Management Section
- Property and Evidence Section
- Policy, Accreditation and Directives Section
- Capital Projects

Technology, Data and Analysis Division

- Crime Analysis Unit
- Information Services Section
- System Operations Section
- Tactical Computers Section

Fiscal Management Unit

Emergency Readiness & Operational Planning Division

== Notable Incidents ==
On September 11, 2001, the Alexandria Police Department responded to the Pentagon in response to the September 11 attacks as mutual aid to support the Arlington County Police Department, the jurisdiction in which the attacks occurred.

The department responded to shots fired on June 14, 2017, to a quiet Del Ray neighborhood. Officers from both Alexandria and the United States Capitol Police shot and killed James Hodgkinson after a 10-minute gun battle with the assailant, an event that became known as the Congressional baseball shooting. Hodgkinson was attempting to kill Republican congressmen who were practicing on the Monroe Street baseball field for the annual Congressional Baseball Game for Charity. Three officers from the Alexandria Police Department received the Public Safety Officer Medal of Valor on July 27, 2017, in recognition of their heroism during the shooting. The Medal of Valor is the highest decoration for bravery exhibited by public safety officers in the United States.

== See also ==
- List of law enforcement agencies in Virginia
