= Suffolk Police =

Suffolk Police may refer to:

- Suffolk Constabulary, East Anglia, England
- Suffolk County Sheriff's Department, in Massachusetts
- Suffolk County Police Department, in New York
- Suffolk Police Department, in Virginia
