= Virginia Marine Police =

- Abbreviation: VMP

Agency overview
- Formed: 1875
- Preceding agency: Virginia Fish Commission

Jurisdictional structure
- Operations jurisdiction: United States

Operational structure
- Headquarters: Fort Monroe, Virginia
- Parent agency: Virginia Marine Resources Commission

Website
- https://mrc.virginia.gov/MP/leoverview.shtm

The Virginia Marine Police is the law enforcement division of the Virginia Marine Resources Commission, an agency of the Commonwealth of Virginia, United States.

== Mission ==
The primary functions of the Virginia Marine Police, as the front-line defenders of Virginia's tidal natural resources, remain consistent with its establishment as Virginia's Oyster Navy in 1864. The uniform patrol section's main duties include enforcement of commercial and saltwater recreational fisheries, boating safety enforcement, boat accident investigation, search and rescue, and counter-terrorism patrols and protection of Virginia's high-value maritime assets.

In addition to state fisheries laws and regulations, many Marine Police Officers are deputized Federal Officers through the National Oceanic and Atmospheric Administration's National Marine Fisheries Service and can enforce NMFS and U.S. Fish and Wildlife Service laws. In coordination with the National Shellfish Sanitation Program and the Virginia Department of Health, Division of Shellfish Sanitation, Officers are responsible for regular patrols of condemned shellfish areas to ensure harvest restrictions are adhered to.

== Organization ==
=== Administration ===
The administrative section of the Virginia Marine Police is located at the Virginia Marine Resources Commission headquarters in historic Fort Monroe, Virginia. The Division is currently headed by Colonel Matthew Rogers, whose appointment to the position was announced in May 2020. The Colonel is assisted by a Lieutenant Colonel, a Training Lieutenant, and an Operations Lieutenant.

=== Uniform Patrol ===
The uniform patrol section comprises a majority of the Marine Police division. The section is split into four geographic work areas, each headed by a Captain and two First Sergeants, who oversee the day-to-day operations of the patrol officers. Regular patrols are done by air, land, and sea. The agency operates a single engine fixed-wing aircraft, and many marked and unmarked vessels and vehicles.

==== Northern Area ====
This area's responsibility includes the Rappahannock River, the upper portion of Virginia's Chesapeake Bay, the Potomac River, and tributaries of these bodies of water. Its office is located in Wicomico Church, Virginia. Geographically, the Northern Area covers the Northern Neck of Virginia and Northern Virginia.

==== Middle Area ====
This area's responsibility includes the Rappahannock River, the middle portion of the Chesapeake Bay, Mobjack Bay, the York River, the Poquoson River, and tributaries of these bodies of water. Its office is located in Gloucester, Virginia. Geographically, the Middle Area covers the Middle Peninsula of Virginia, and portions of the Hampton Roads area.

==== Southern Area ====
This area's responsibility includes the James River, Elizabeth River, Nansemond River, their tributaries, and others in the area. Its office is located at the Marine Police Division's Operations Station in Newport News, Virginia, overlooking the James River.

==== Eastern Shore ====
This area's responsibility includes both the Chesapeake Bay and Atlantic Ocean side of Virginia's Eastern Shore. Its office is located in Belle Haven, Virginia.

=== Special Investigations Unit ===
The Special Investigations Unit operates state-wide and handles a number of high-priority investigations, often working closely with federal partners.

=== Operations ===
"Operations" as it is known, encompasses several sub-sections, which include a Maintenance section and Communications section. These sections are based at the Division's Operations Station in Newport News, Virginia.

==== Maintenance ====
The maintenance section is responsible for the day-to-day repair, maintenance, and rigging of vessels. The agency currently has 46 vessels in service.

==== Communications ====
The communications section are the primary dispatchers for the Uniform Patrol officers in the field. The communications section coordinates responses with other state, local, and federal agencies.

== Origins and history ==
=== 1864 ===
Following the American Civil War it was a time of exploitation and open conflict between watermen over the boundaries and rights to oyster beds. This prompted the establishment of the Virginia Oyster Navy (and Maryland Oyster Navy) whose job it was to enforce order, boundaries, and prevent poaching. At that time the Oyster Navy operated two Oyster Schooners, the Tangier and the Pocomoke.

=== 1897 ===
In 1897, the Virginia Oyster Navy and the Board of the Chesapeake were transferred to the Virginia Fisheries Commission, which was established in 1875. At this time, the Oyster Navy operated two steamers, the Chesapeake and the Accomac, in addition to the two schooners.

=== 1917 ===
With The Great War underway, the entire marine patrol of the Virginia Fisheries Commission was placed in the United States Naval Reserve and provided harbor patrol and security in Virginia's waters. The Virginia Marine Police are still responsible for providing security and patrols of high-value assets in the Commonwealth.

=== 1920 ===
A system of State-employed district Oyster Inspectors was established in 1920. Prior to that time, a network of county oyster inspectors and county surveyors administered oyster bed leasing in the localities. The inspectors were compensated by retaining a portion of fines and other fees collected. Their oyster inspection work was generally a sideline to other jobs held in the communities. When the State Fisheries Commission assumed full control of oyster administration in 1920, nineteen oyster districts were established. One full-time inspector was employed for each district at $60.00 per month.

=== 1960s to 1980s ===
Throughout the mid-twentieth century, additional roles and responsibilities were given to the Virginia Fisheries Commission. In 1968, by an act of the Virginia General Assembly, the Fish Commission was renamed the Virginia Marine Resources Commission to better reflect its growing mission.

In the mid to late 1980's the "Inspectors" role changed as the agency transitioned to the Marine Patrol, where its members became sworn law enforcement officers with police powers.

The primary responsibility is the enforcement of state commercial and recreational fishery regulations as well as federal wildlife laws of the National Marine Fisheries Service and the U.S. Fish & Wildlife Service. Virginia Marine Police are also authorized to perform other law enforcement duties including investigation of criminal activities and boating accidents. The agency provides resources for search and rescue operations.

== See also ==
- Virginia Marine Resources Commission
- List of law enforcement agencies in Virginia
