= Prince William County Sheriff's Office =

- Abbreviation: PWCSO

Agency overview
- Formed: 1731
- Employees: 106
- Annual budget: $11.8 million (FY20)

Jurisdictional structure
- Operations jurisdiction: Prince William, Virginia, USA
- Map of Prince William County Sheriff's Office's jurisdiction
- Area: 348 square miles (900 km^{2})
- Population: 402,002
- Legal jurisdiction: Prince William County, Manassas and Manassas Park
- Governing body: County (United States)
- Constituting instrument: Yes
- General nature: Local civilian police

Operational structure
- Headquarters: Manassas, Virginia
- Deputys: 88
- Civilians: 11
- Agency executive: Glendell Hill, Sheriff

Facilities
- Stations: 1

Website
- Official Website

The Prince William County, Virginia Sheriff's Office was established in 1731 to provide law enforcement and jailers for the County. In 1970, the Board of County Supervisors established the Prince William County Police Department which assumed the primary responsibility for law enforcement. In 1982, the Prince William County Adult Detention Center opened and assumed the duties of jailers. The Sheriff is a constitutional office elected by the Prince William County, City of Manassas and City of Manassas Park to provide certain public safety services.

== History ==
The PWCSO was founded in 1731 and was the sole law enforcement agency for the county until 1970, when most patrol and investigations duties were turned over to the newly-formed Police Department. The agency is now responsible for courtroom security, all jail and prisoner operations, court orders and civil process operations, and fugitive tracking and apprehension.

As of 2022 the sheriff is Sheriff Glendell Hill (R), who has held the position since 2004. Hill is the county's first Black sheriff.

In 2005, the Sheriff's Office achieved re-accreditation for a second time.

In January 2021, after the identity of a deputy was revealed as advocating violence against Supreme Court Chief Justice John Roberts on Parler, the deputy was immediately fired. He had been a deputy for 15 years. He stated his account was hacked, though an anti-fascist activist was able to verify his identity through several sites.

== See also ==
- List of law enforcement agencies in Virginia
- Prince William County Police Department
