= Arlington County Sheriff's Office =

Law enforcement agency in Virginia, United States

- Abbreviation: ACSO

Agency overview
- Formed: 1869
- Employees: 265

Jurisdictional structure
- Operations jurisdiction: Arlington, Virginia, USA
- Map of Arlington County Sheriff's Office's jurisdiction
- Area: 26 square miles (67 km^{2})
- Population: 207,627
- Legal jurisdiction: Arlington County
- Governing body: County
- Constituting instrument: Yes
- General nature: Local civilian police

Operational structure
- Headquarters: Arlington, Virginia
- Agency executive: Jose Quiroz (D), Sheriff

Website
- Official website

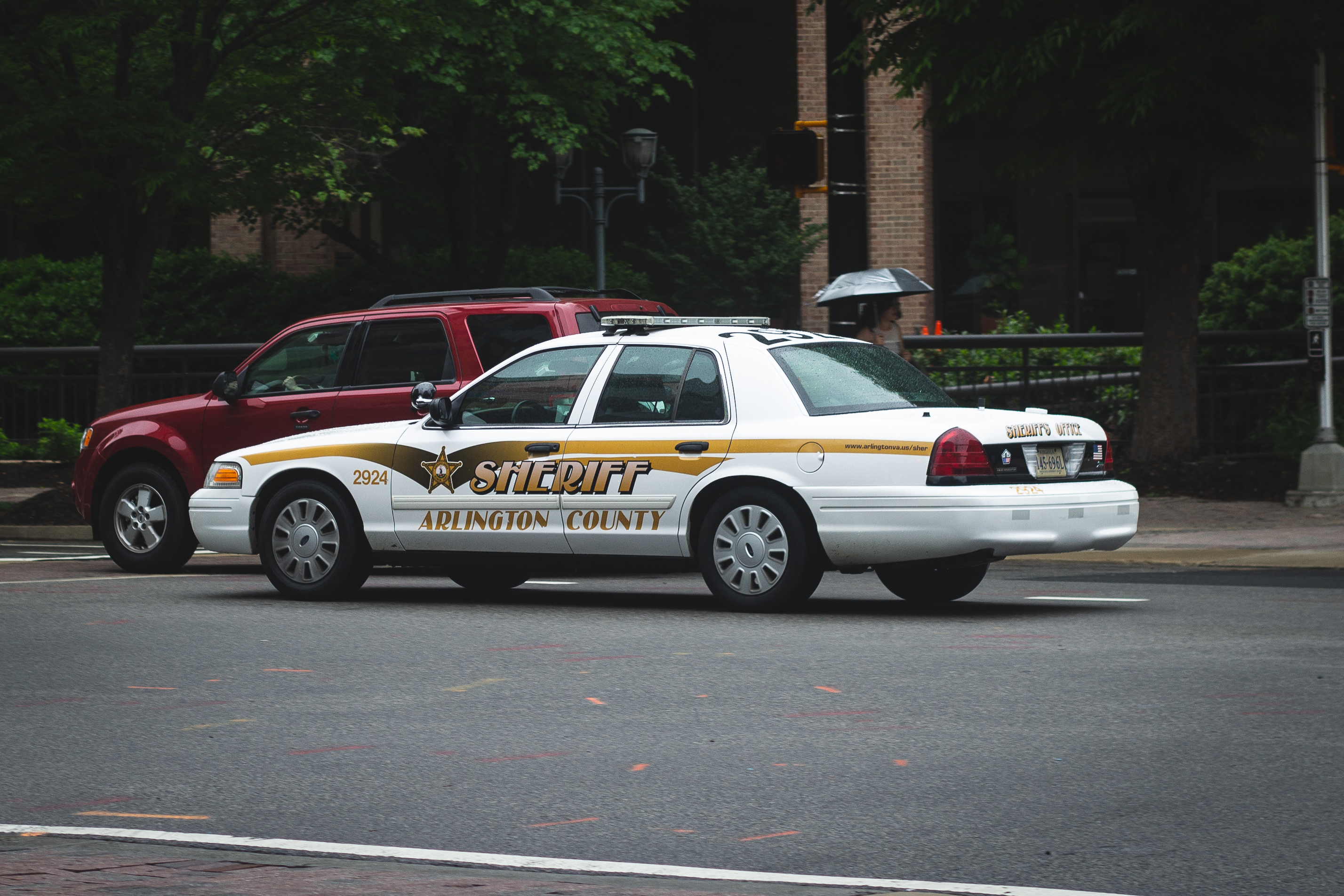
An Arlington County Sheriff's vehicle

The Arlington County Sheriff's Office (ACSO) provides law enforcement services for 207,627 people within 26 square miles (67 km^{2}) of jurisdiction within Arlington County, Virginia. These services include responsibility for the operation of the local jail, courthouse security and service of civil papers. The Sheriff may also execute criminal warrants. Unlike the Arlington County Police Department, it is not responsible for patrol or investigations.

== History ==
The ACSO was created in 1869 when I.C. O'Neil was appointed as the first sheriff. The ACSO is a Nationally Accredited Public Safety Agency.

In 2016, the office settled with the federal government over alleged violations of the Americans with Disabilities Act of 1990 regarding a deaf prison inmate.

In 2022, after seven men of color had died in the Arlington county jail over the previous seven years, the Arlington branch of the NAACP requested a federal investigation of the county jail. A $10 million lawsuit was independently filed regarding one of these deaths.

== Jail ==
The facility employs a total of approximately 200 staff members, 160 being Deputy Sheriffs.

== See also ==
- List of law enforcement agencies in Virginia
- Arlington County Police Department
