= Prince William County Police Department =

Police department in Virginia, United States

- Abbreviation: PWCPD

Agency overview
- Formed: July 1, 1970
- Employees: 950
- Annual budget: $180,178,540 (FY27)

Jurisdictional structure
- Operations jurisdiction: Prince William, Virginia, USA
- Map of Prince William County Police Department's jurisdiction
- Area: 348 square miles (900 km^{2})
- Population: 469,236
- Governing body: County (United States)
- General nature: Local civilian police

Operational structure
- Headquarters: Woodbridge, Virginia
- Police Officers: 747
- Civilians: 250
- Agency executive: Peter J. Newsham, Chief of Police

Facilities
- Districts: 3
- Boats: 2

Notables
- Anniversary: July 1, 2020 (50th Anniversary)
- Award: CALEA TRI-ARC Excellence Award & Enhanced Certificate of Meritorious Accreditation

Website
- Official Website

Prince William County Police Department (PWCPD) is a county police department in Prince William County, Virginia, United States. PWCPD has primary jurisdiction in all towns within the county, including Dumfries, Occoquan, Haymarket, and Quantico, which also have their own police departments. The County Police department also has limited enforcement jurisdiction in the independent city of Manassas through a Memorandum of Understanding (MOU).

== History ==
PWCPD began operations on July 1, 1970, and it has been fully accredited by the Commission on Accreditation for Law Enforcement Agencies (CALEA) since 1987.

The Prince William County Police Department found itself in the news in July 2017 for issuing an arrest warrant for Lucky Whitehead, a player in the National Football League. At the time of the incident, Whitehead, a local native of Manassas, Virginia, was a player for the Dallas Cowboys. On June 22, 2017, officers from the Prince William County Police Department arrested an individual for petit larceny who verbally provided the name Rodney Darnell "Lucky" Whitehead Jr. to officers. The officers from the Prince William County Police Department did not validate the individual's identity via a government issued photo identification, nor did officers take a mug shot of the individual at the time he was arrested. Subsequently, an arrest warrant was issued for Whitehead for failure to appear in court. At the time of incident in Virginia, Whitehead was in the state of Texas, a fact not investigated by Prince William County officers. As a direct result of the arrest warrant, Whitehead was released from his contract with the Dallas Cowboys.

A spokesman for Prince William County police, Jonathan Perok, issued several contradictory official statements on the matter. In July 2017, the final statement from Perok indicated that Prince William police still do not know the true identity of the individual they arrested and, "The police department is working with the Prince William County Commonwealth Attorney's Office to clear Mr. Whitehead from this investigation. The police department regrets the impact these events had on Mr. Whitehead and his family."

== Gallery ==
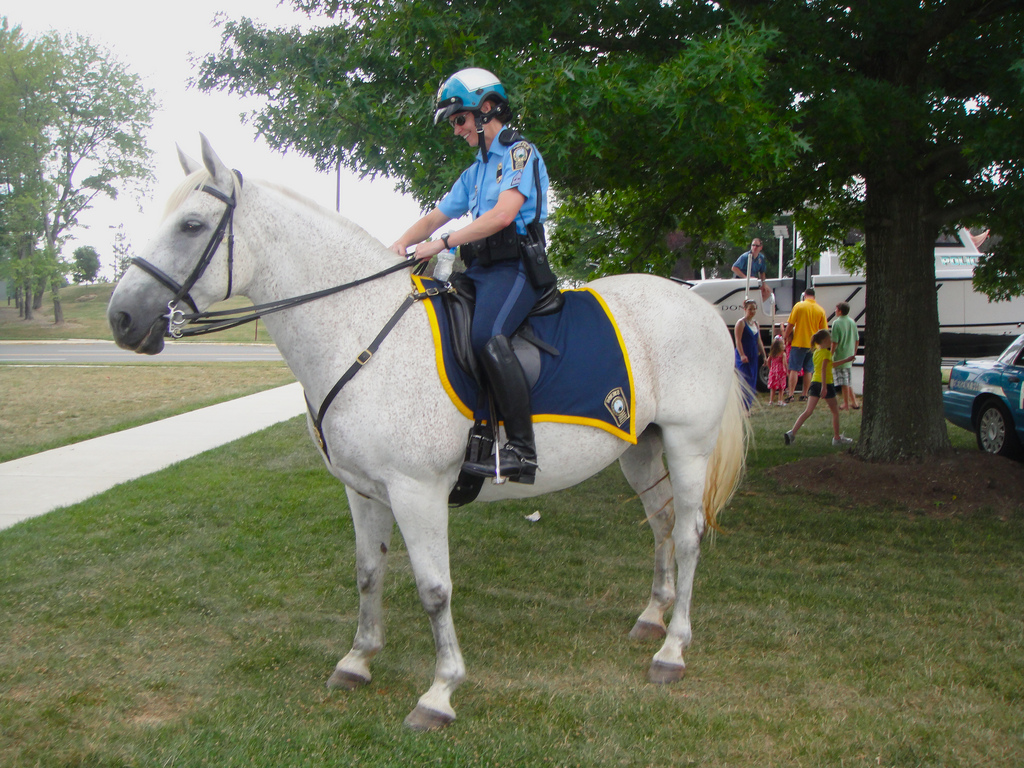
Prince William County Police Mounted Patrol

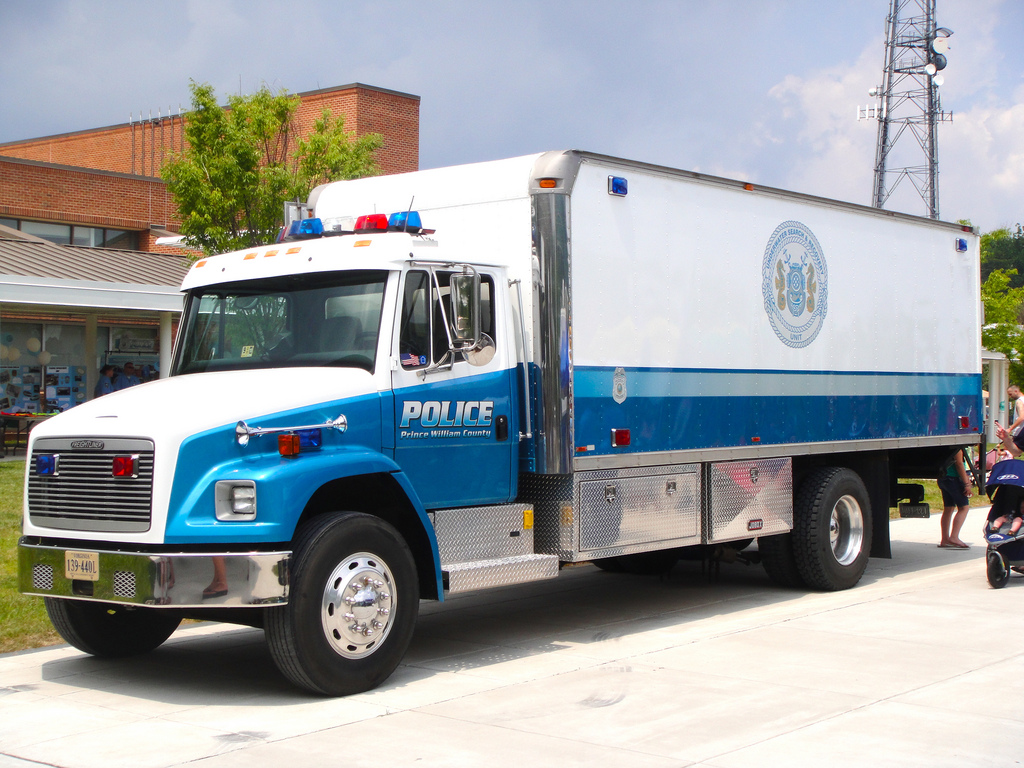
Prince William County Police Underwater Search & Rescue Unit

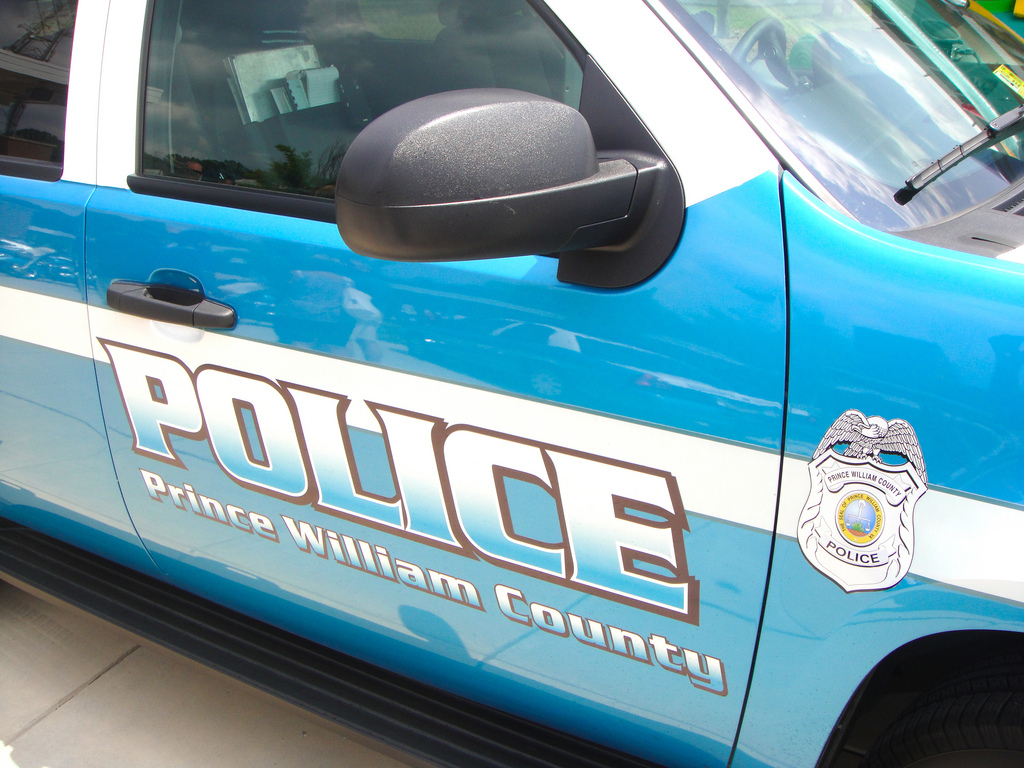
Prince William County Police Crash Investigation Unit

== See also ==
- List of law enforcement agencies in Virginia
- Prince William County Sheriff's Office
