= Metro Transit Police Department =

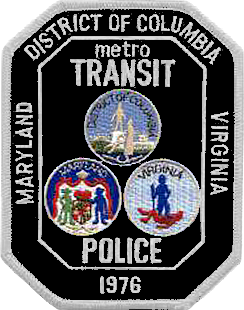
- Patch of the Metro Transit Police Department

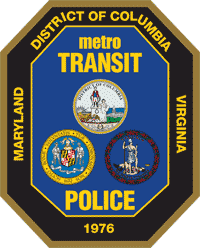
- Emblem of the MTPD

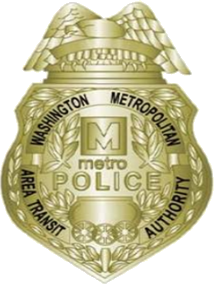
- Badge of the Metro Transit Police Department
- Common name: Metro Transit Police
- Abbreviation: MTPD

Agency overview
- Formed: June 4, 1976
- Employees: 550

Jurisdictional structure
- Operations jurisdiction: U.S.
- Legal jurisdiction: District of Columbia, Maryland, Virginia
- Governing body: Washington Metropolitan Area Transit Authority
- General nature: Civilian police

Operational structure
- Headquarters: 3421 Pennsy Drive, Hyattsville, Maryland, U.S. 38.935952°N 76.878300°W
- Agency executive: Michael Anzallo, Chief of Police

Facilities
- Patrol cars: Chevrolet Tahoes, Chevrolet Suburbans, Ford Crown Victoria Police Interceptors
- Motorcycles: Harley-Davidson FLs

Website
- www.wmata.com/about/transit-police/

The Metro Transit Police Department (MTPD) is the transit police agency of the Washington Metropolitan Area Transit Authority (WMATA), created by the WMATA Compact on June 4, 1976.

The MTPD is unique in U.S. law enforcement as it is the only U.S. police agency that has full police authority in relation to a multi-state metro system. The MTPD has authority in three jurisdictions: Maryland, Virginia, and Washington, D.C.

== Officers and training ==
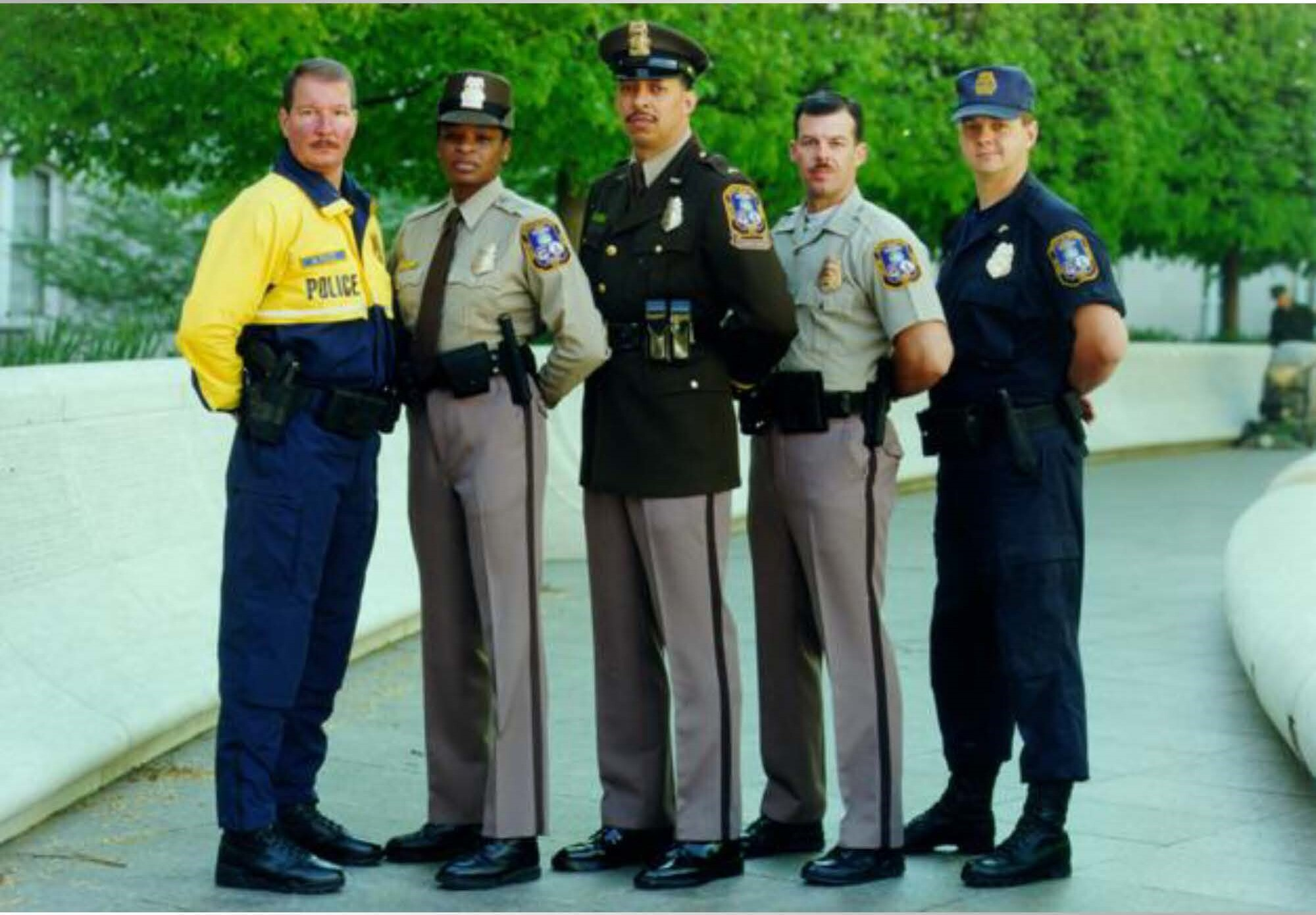
MTPD officers at the National Law Enforcement Officers Memorial in Washington, D.C. c. 1999.

The department has an authorized strength of 490 sworn officers, 170 special police officers, and more than 100 civilian personnel.

Newly sworn officers complete 23 weeks of initial training at the Northern Virginia Criminal Justice Training Academy, followed by 15 weeks of training at the Metro Transit Police Academy, which includes training in Maryland and District of Columbia law, then conclude with 10 weeks of field training under the supervision of a field training officer.

Upon completion of training, all sworn officers are fully accredited police officers within the State of Maryland, the District of Columbia, the Commonwealth of Virginia, and have the same police authority as the local police departments located within the boundaries of the Metro service area.

The MTPD is accredited by the Commission on Accreditation for Law Enforcement Agencies.

== Patrols ==
Former patch of the MTPD, used from the 1990s to 2016.

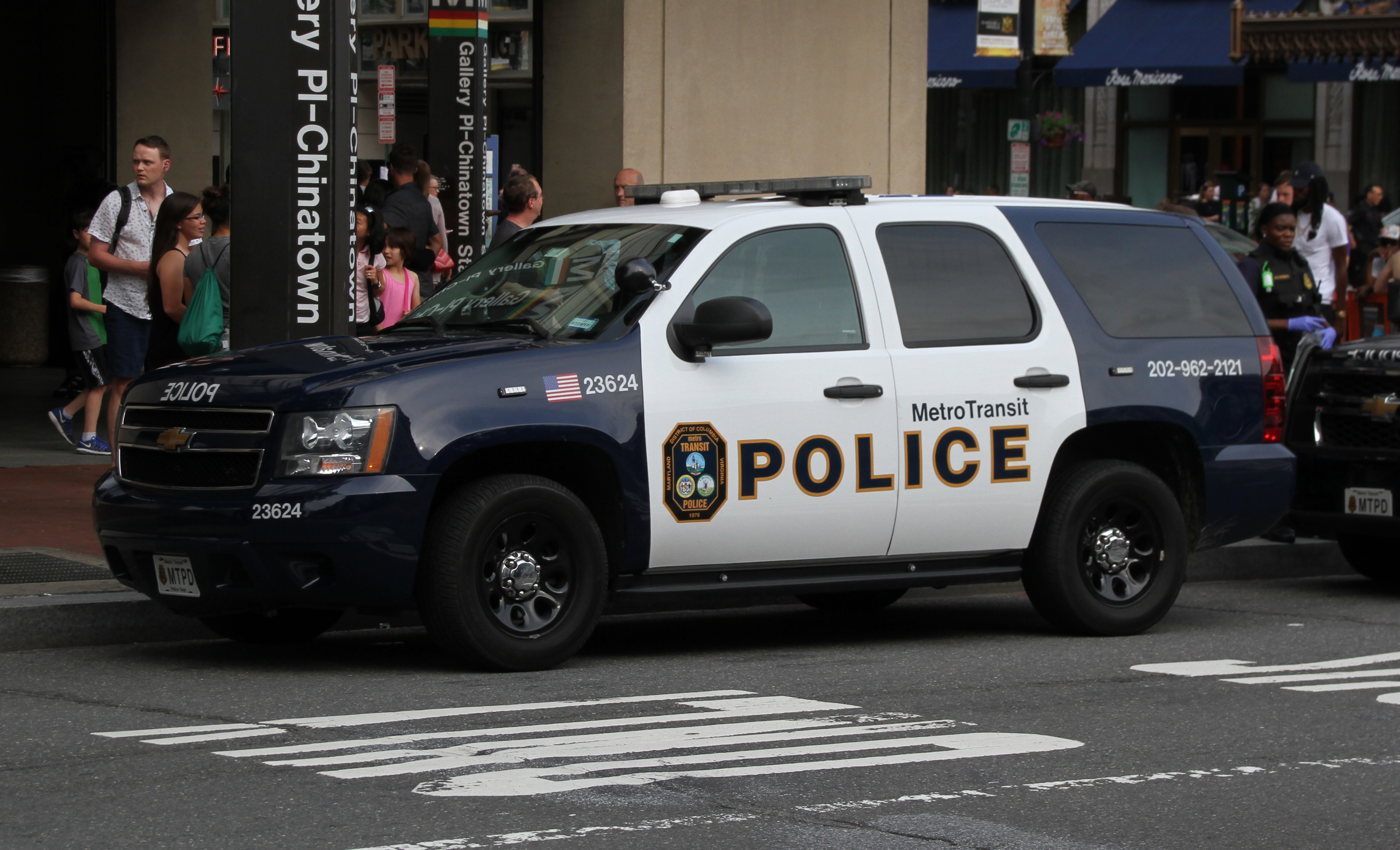
A Chevrolet Tahoe of the MTPD

Uniformed and plainclothes Transit Police officers patrol the Metrorail and Metrobus systems on foot, bicycles, motorcycles, and marked and unmarked police cars. Transit Police detectives provide investigative support.

== Jurisdiction ==
Transit Police officers have jurisdiction and arrest powers throughout the 1,500-square-mile (3,900 km^{2}) Metro service area for crimes and traffic infractions that occur on facilities owned, controlled or operated by the Transit Authority (including bus stops), within 150 feet (46 m) of a Metrobus stop, or that endanger Metro property or patrons.

These jurisdictional boundaries do not limit the Metro Transit Police from making arrests in the Transit Zone for violations committed upon, to or against such facilities, while in hot or close pursuit, or to execute traffic citations and criminal process. Due to mutual aid and memorandums of understanding, while on uniformed patrol, Metro Transit Police have the authority to take police action if they observe a serious crime or infraction in progress within the Metro service area, but outside of the jurisdiction established by the Compact.

The Metro Transit Police have concurrent jurisdiction in performance of their duties with the duly constituted law enforcement agencies of the signatories and of the political subdivisions thereof in which any Transit facility of the Authority is located, or in which the Authority operates any service.

== Duties ==
Metro Transit Police Department therapy dog and handler, 2026

Transit Police are actively involved in protecting Metro passengers, Metro infrastructure, and the local communities from terrorist threats. After the September 11, 2001 attacks, the 2004 Madrid train bombings, and the July 7, 2005 London subway bombings, and periodically since, members of the Metro Transit Police Special Response Team conduct security sweeps of the rail system in tactical gear, carrying long rifles and submachine guns, and supported by explosive ordnance detection K-9 teams. The department has a dedicated explosive disposal team and K-9 unit, and often assists local and federal law enforcement agencies with their resources in those fields.

Officers are currently issued the SIG Sauer P320 Carry 9 mm which is used as the standard issue sidearm. Prior to this, officers carried a SIG Sauer P226 or P229, chambered for .40 S&W. Officers are also trained and certified to carry pepperball launchers and shotguns.

== Units ==
The MTPD has various units within it to fulfil its obligations, these include:

- Bicycle Patrol Officer
- Motorcycle Officers
- Civil Disturbance Unit

- Crime Scene Search Officers
- Crime Analysis and Records Division
- Criminal Investigation Division

- Digital Evidence Unit
- Explosive Detection Canine
- Explosive Ordinance Disposal

- Police Communication Division
- Property and Evidence Unit

- Special Response Team
- Tactical Operations Division
- Training Division
- Warrant and Fugitive Unit

- Youth Services Division
- Community Outreach Branch

== Fallen officers ==
Since the establishment of the Metro Transit Police Department, two officers have been killed in the line of duty. Officer Harry Davis, Jr., was shot and killed in Landover, Maryland, while investigating a stolen vehicle parked at a Metro facility near the Landover station on December 20, 1993. Officer Marlon Morales was shot in the District of Columbia by a fare evasion suspect at the U Street Metro station on June 10, 2001. Morales succumbed to his wounds and died on June 13, 2001. The suspects in both murders were identified, captured, tried, and convicted. Davis' killer was convicted of first degree murder, and Morales' killer was sentenced to life in prison without the possibility of parole on July 30, 2004.

== Policies of Metro Transit ==
=== Eating and drinking ===
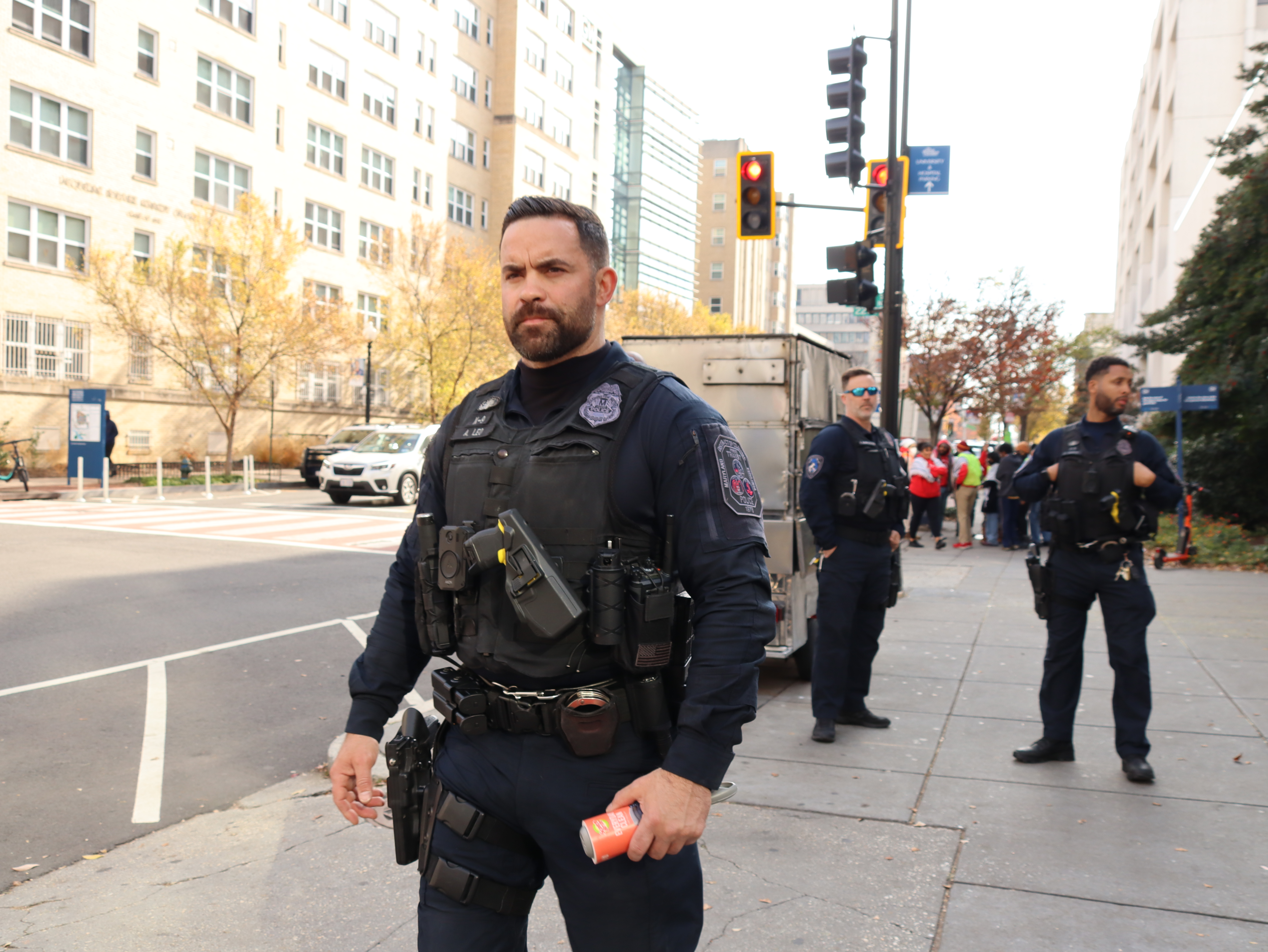
A Transit Police Officer in uniform

Local ordinances strictly forbid riders from eating or drinking while on board a Metrobus, Metrorail train, or inside stations. Officers are required to take police action when they observe any criminal activity, but arrests for these minor violations are rare. One exception was on October 23, 2000, when a 12-year-old girl was arrested, searched, and handcuffed for refusing to stop eating french fries while in the Tenleytown–AU Metro station. She was taken to a police juvenile processing area where she was booked, fingerprinted, and detained until her mother arrived to pick her up. At the time of the incident, the officer had no legal authority to take any formal action against a juvenile other than make an arrest. This policy has since been changed and MTPD officers may now issue written warnings to juvenile offenders. Another widely noted case occurred on July 16, 2004, when an EPA employee entered the Metro Center station with a PayDay candy bar. Before passing through the fare gates, patrolling police officers told her to finish eating before she could enter the paid area. Instead, she popped the last bite of the bar into her mouth, continuing to chew it while in the station. She was subsequently arrested after refusing to cooperate with the issuance of a citation for the offense.

Doug Berman, creator producer of NPR shows Car Talk and Wait Wait... Don't Tell Me!, was often credited on the former by the nickname "Subway Fugitive", supposedly dating to an incident where he was being ticketed for consuming coffee in a Metro station, but slipped onto a train, escaping the citation. Another passenger was issued a citation for peeling and eating a banana.

While sometimes seen as excessive, Metro's zero-tolerance policy when it comes to crime and disorder, but also seemingly inconsequential actions such as eating, drinking, or littering, embodies the broken windows philosophy of crime reduction. According to criminal justice author Nancy G. La Vigne, Metro's attempts to reduce crime, combined with how the station environments were designed with crime prevention in mind, has contributed to the fact that Washington Metro was regarded to be among the safest and cleanest subway systems in the United States in 1996. This has recently been challenged in the media and community after several safety incidents including a full day shutdown on March 15, 2016.

=== Restrooms ===
The broken windows philosophy also extends to use of station restroom facilities. Metro's long-standing policy restricts use of restrooms to only employees in order to prevent undesirable activity such as graffiti. One widely publicized example of this was when a pregnant woman was denied access to the bathroom by a station manager at the Shady Grove station in June 2016. Metro now allows the use of restrooms by passengers who gain a station manager's permission, except during periods of heightened terror alerts.

=== Random bag searches ===
On October 27, 2008, the Metro Transit Police announced plans to immediately begin random searches of backpacks, purses, and other bags. Transit police would search riders at random before boarding a bus or entering a station. It also explained its intent to stop anyone acting suspiciously. Metro claims that "Legal authority to inspect packages brought into the Metro system has been established by the court system on similar types of inspections in mass transit properties, airports, military facilities and courthouses." Metro Transit Police Chief Michael Taborn stated that, if someone were to turn around and simply enter the system through another escalator or elevator, Metro has "a plan to address suspicious behavior". Security expert Bruce Schneier characterized the plan as "security theater against a movie plot threat" and does not believe random bag searches actually improve security.

The Metro Riders' Advisory Council recommended to WMATA's board of directors that Metro hold at least one public meeting regarding the search program. As of December 2008, Metro had not conducted a single bag search.

In 2010 Metro once again announced that it would implement random bag searches, and conducted the first such searches on December 21, 2010. The searches consist of swabbing bags and packages for explosive residue, and X-raying or opening any packages which turned up positive. On the first day of searches, at least one false positive for explosives was produced, which Metro officials indicated could occur for a variety of reasons including if a passenger had recently been in contact with firearms or been to a firing range. The D.C. Bill of Rights Coalition and the Montgomery County Civil Rights Coalition circulated a petition against random bag searches, taking the position that the practice violates the Fourth Amendment to the United States Constitution and would not improve security. On January 3, 2011, Metro held a public forum for the searches at a Metro Riders' Advisory Council meeting, at which more than 50 riders spoke out, most of them in opposition to the searches. Despite this, Metro officials called the random bag inspections a "success" and stated that few riders had complained.

As of 2022, random bag searches have not been conducted in several years.

== See also ==
- Maryland Transportation Authority Police
- List of law enforcement agencies in the District of Columbia
