= Dorchester, Virginia =

Unincorporated community in Virginia, US

Coordinates: 37°28′3″N 77°28′29″W

Dorchester is an unincorporated community in the City of Richmond, in the U.S. state of Virginia.
