= Virginia Marine Resources Commission =

State agency focusing on marine and aquatic life

Virginia Marine Resources Commission's patch

The Virginia Marine Resources Commission is a state agency charged with overseeing Virginia's marine and aquatic resources, and its tidal waters and homelands. One of the primary functions of the Commission is to zone water areas for outdoor swimming, for oyster and clamming grounds, and for fishing use.

== See also ==
- Virginia Marine Police
- Virginia Department of Wildlife Resources
