= Suffolk Police Department =

Law Enforcement Agency in Suffolk, Virginia

- Color patch of the Suffolk Police Department

- Abbreviation: SPD

Agency overview
- Formed: January 1, 1974
- Preceding agencies: Suffolk Police Department (1858-1973); Nansemond County Police Department (1970-1973)

Jurisdictional structure
- Operations jurisdiction: Suffolk, Virginia, United States
- General nature: Local civilian police

Operational structure
- Headquarters: Suffolk, Virginia

Facilities
- Stations: 2 Precincts

Website
- www.suffolkva.us/288/Police

The Suffolk Police Department (SPD) is the primary law enforcement agency in Suffolk, Virginia. The department has about 200 full-time staff in total, serving around 100,000 people in an area 428.91 sq mi (1,110.86 km2).

== History ==
In 1858, the City of Suffolk was granted a charter establishing the position of town sergeant. On August 1, 1884, James E. Ballard was appointed as a special policeman under the town sergeant, with a pay of $12.50 a month. In 1910, the position of town sergeant was renamed to the Chief of Police. In October 1934, an AM radio broadcast system was installed for department use by a radio engineer from New Jersey. The primary antenna was located at the rear of city hall and was 117 feet tall; radios were also installed in the patrol cars as well as the vehicles used by the Chief of Police. This was replaced with an FM Radio system in June 1945 by a Richmond company.

The 8-hour work day formally started on July 2, 1938, with three shifts per day. Each shift would consist of several patrol officers, and a sergeant. This is the same basic system in use as of May 2026. In September 1962, the Suffolk Police Department moved their headquarters to 120 North Wellons Street, where it turns into Market Street. The department moved again to a new Headquarters located at 111 Henley Place on August 4, 2009. The Nansemond County Police Department was awarded a grant by the Virginia Council on Criminal Justice in 1971 that would permit them to interface with a system known as the Tidewater Police Information Network (TENPEN), which itself was connected to the National Crime Information Center. The Suffolk Police Department would share access to this system with Nansemond County. On January 1, 1974, when the Cities of Suffolk and Nansemond merged into the new City of Suffolk, the respective law enforcement agencies officially consolidated, with the head of the former Nansemond County Police Department Henry L. Mundie being selected as the Chief of Police.

In November 2000, the Suffolk Police Department began to use livescan equipment for fingerprinting instead of ink; The Department of Criminal Justice Services provided the department with the grant to purchase the technology.

=== Notable Events ===
In April 2026, the Suffolk Police Department, Norfolk DEA, and US Customs and Border Protection seized approximately 350lbs (159kg) of cocaine valued at an estimated $6,000,000 from a location within the city.

== Organization ==
The Suffolk Police Department is led by a Chief of Police, who is appointed by the City Manager. Underneath the Chief of Police are three Deputy Chiefs, each responsible for one of the three divisions within the department (Operations, Investigations, and Administration).

=== Operations ===
The Operations Command oversees both of the Suffolk Police Precincts as well as the Special Operations division, which includes the police auxiliary, K-9 Unit, Marine Patrol, Motor Carrier Unit, School Resource Officers, Search and Rescue Squad, Dive field team, Mobile field force, and the Traffic Unit

Starting August 7, 2025, Major Robert Fahrman is the Deputy Chief assigned to the Operations Command.

=== Investigations ===
The Investigations Command is responsible for the investigation of criminal activity within the city, and oversees Criminal and Special Investigations divisions, Neighborhood Enforcement Teams, Forensics, and Criminal Intelligence and Analysis.

=== Administrative ===
The Administrative Command oversees the Administrative Division, Animal Control, the Professional Standards Division, as well as the department's volunteer programs.

The Administrative Division consists of the Administrative Analyst, Central Records, the Emergency Communications Center, the Fugitive Unit, Property and Evidence, the department's quartermaster, and Staff Coordination.

The Professional Standards division consists of Internal Affairs, Accreditation and Inspections, Training, Recruitment, and Background Investigators.

As of August 2024, Major Jesse Epperson is the Deputy Chief assigned to the Administrative Command.

== Area of Operations ==
The Suffolk Police Department is headquartered at 111 Henley Place, on the corner with West Washington Street, directly across from the Suffolk Municipal Center. The city is divided into two police precincts (or Sectors), with Precinct One mostly serving the downtown area, and the countryside from US 58 south to the Virginia-North Carolina border, and Precinct Two mostly serving the rest of the city from US 58 north to the James River.

=== Headquarters ===
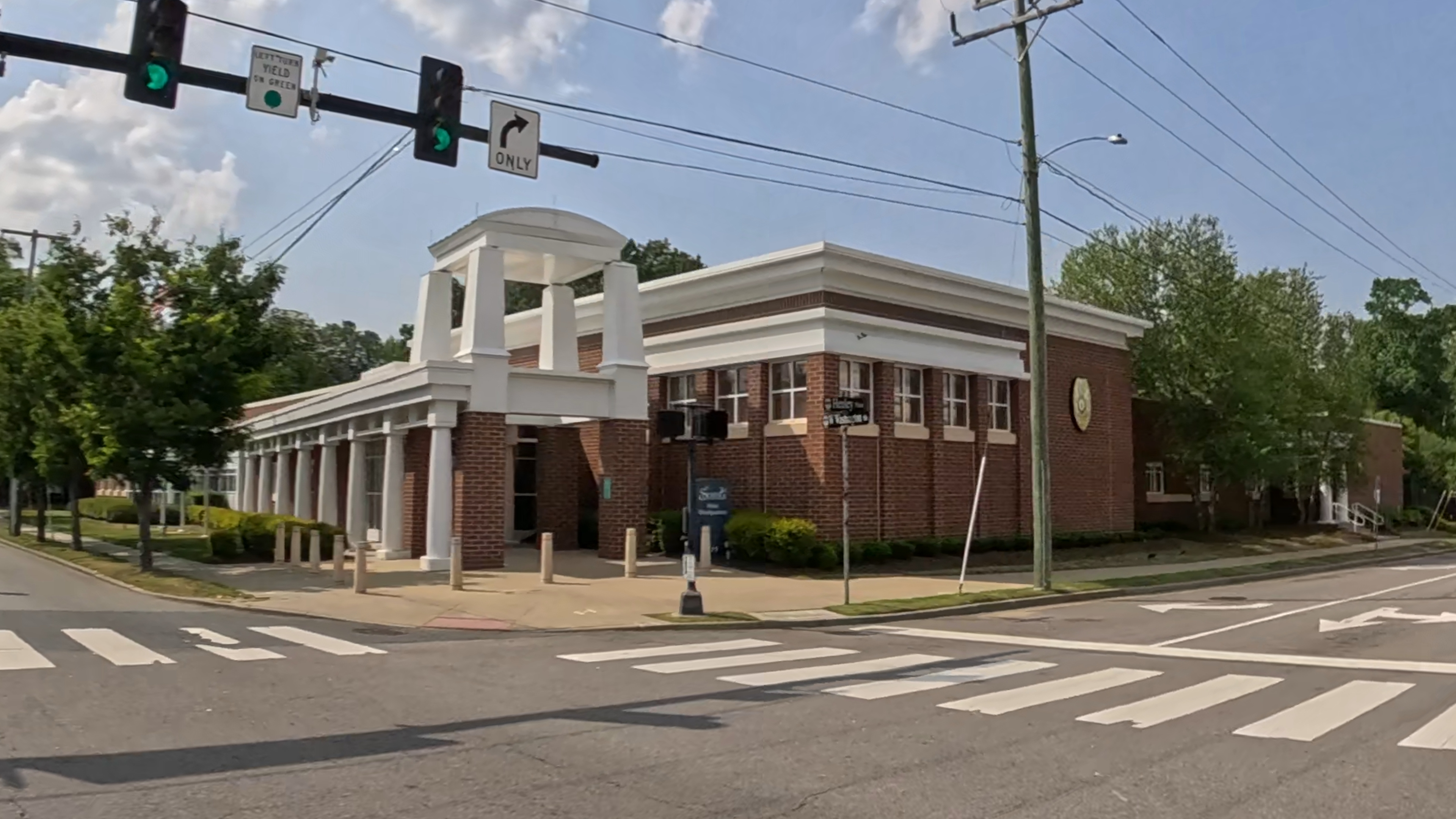
Suffolk Police Headquarters, Apr 2026

Located at 111 Henley Place; holds offices for the Administrative Command Division and parts of the Investigations Division.

While uniform patrol officers are not stationed at headquarters, the location does house the Command Staff, including the Chief of Police, as well as the Detective Bureau and most of the Special Investigations Unit. In addition, CSI, Recruiting, Central Records, and Property & Evidence are all located within this building.

=== Sector One ===
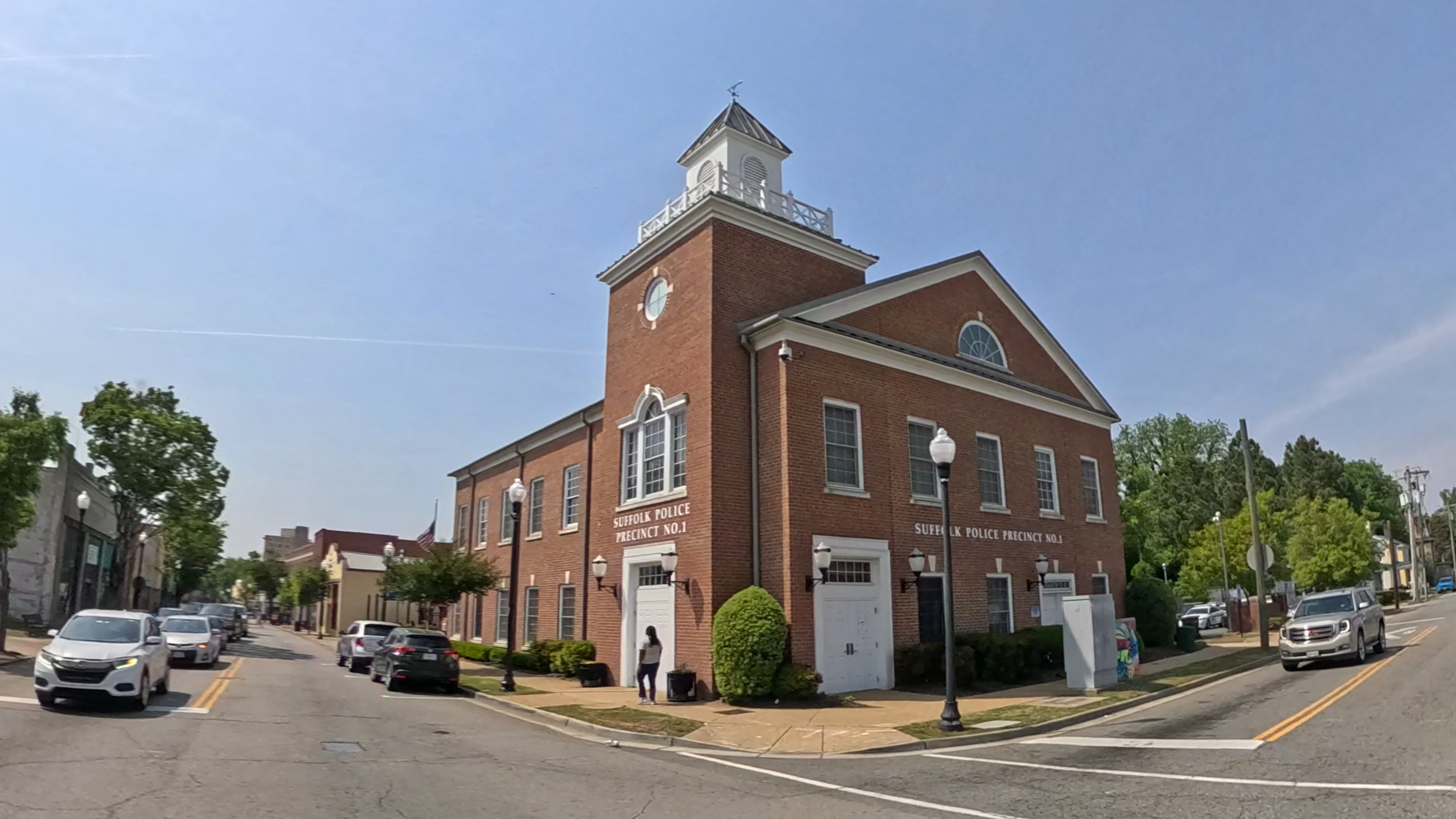
Sector One as seen from Pinner and East Washington, Apr 2026

Located at 230 East Washington Street, Sector One has 57 sworn officers, responsible for 310 sq mi (802.896 km2) of the city, comprising 46% of the population.

=== Sector Two ===
Located at 3903 Bridge Road, Sector Two has approx. 35% of the uniform patrol, as well as the Special Operations Division, responsible for 120 sq mi (310.799km2) of the city.

== See Also ==
- Suffolk, Virginia
- List of law enforcement agencies in Virginia
