= Arlington County Police Department =

Police department in Virginia, U.S.

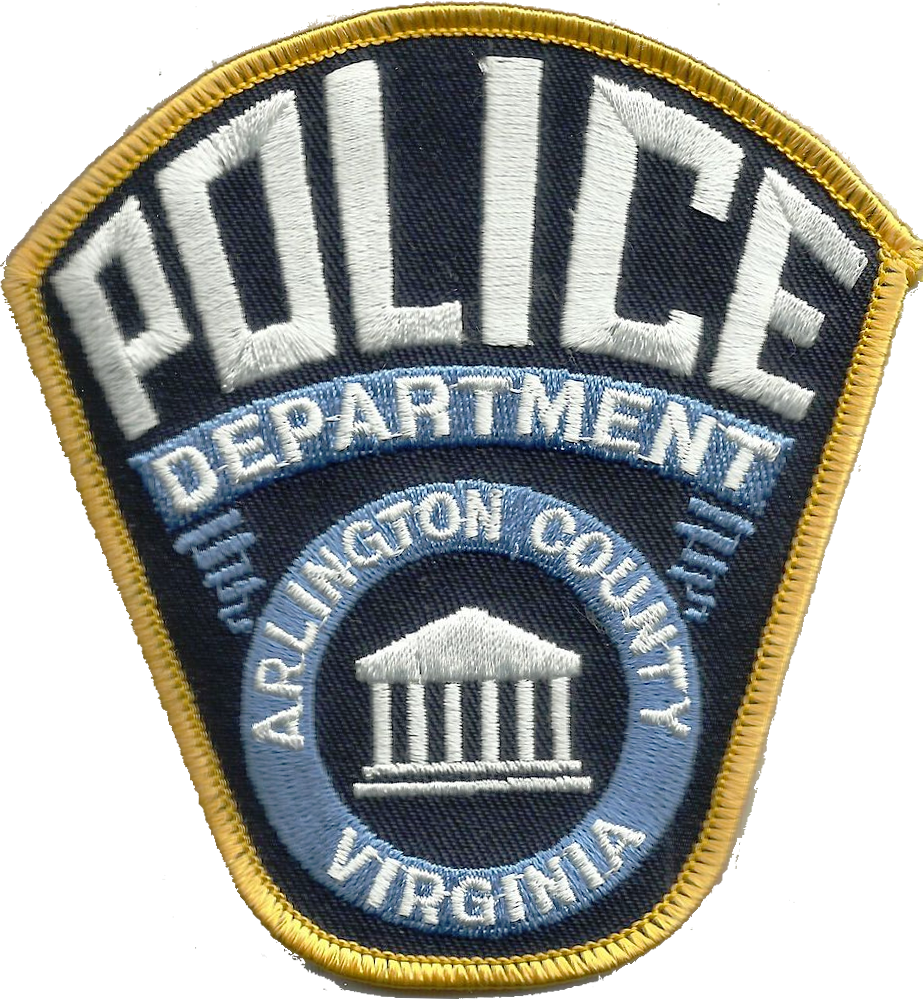

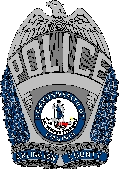
- Badge of an Arlington County Police Department officer

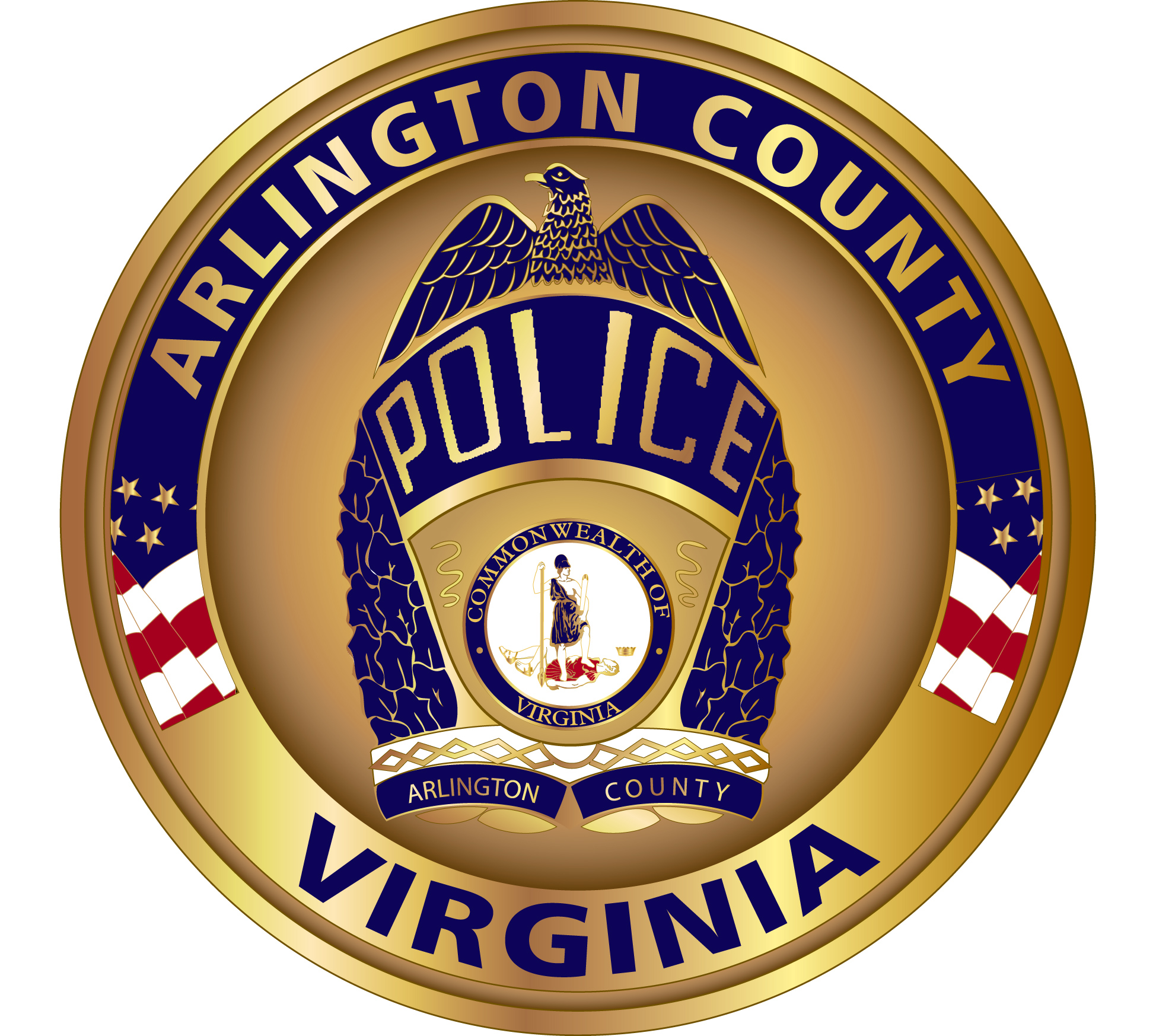
- Seal of the Arlington County Police Department
- Common name: Arlington County P.D.
- Abbreviation: ACPD

Agency overview
- Formed: October 1, 1963
- Preceding agency: Arlington County Division of Police (February 1940 – October 1963)
- Employees: 465
- Annual budget: $58 million

Jurisdictional structure
- Operations jurisdiction: Arlington, Virginia, USA
- Map of Arlington County Police Department's jurisdiction
- Area: 26 square miles (67 km^{2})
- Population: 238,643
- Legal jurisdiction: Arlington County
- Governing body: County of Arlington
- Constituting instrument: Yes
- General nature: Local civilian police

Operational structure
- Headquarters: Arlington County, Virginia
- Police officers: 300
- Civilians: 104
- Agency executive: Charles Penn, Chief of Police

Website
- Official Website

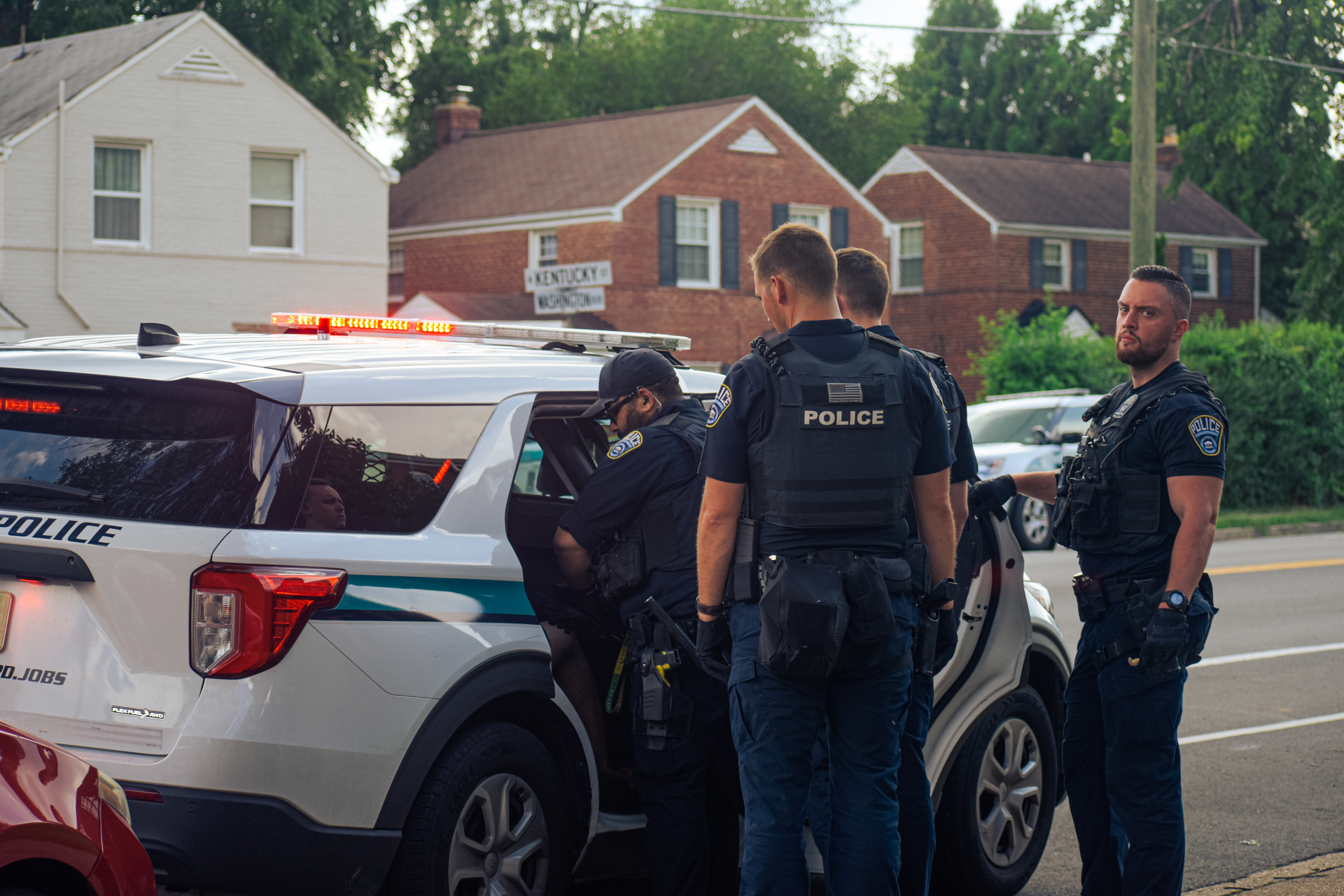
Arlington police officers apprehending a suspect from the Westover Apartments (2024).

The Arlington County Police Department (ACPD) is the municipal law enforcement agency servicing the 238,643 residents of the 26 square miles (67 km^{2}) of jurisdiction within Arlington County, Virginia. It is the primary law enforcement agency in the county for all levels of law enforcement, although the many federal reservations, enclaves and special jurisdictions in the county often maintain their own law enforcement agencies, which often collaborate with the County Police on many of their larger issues.

== History ==
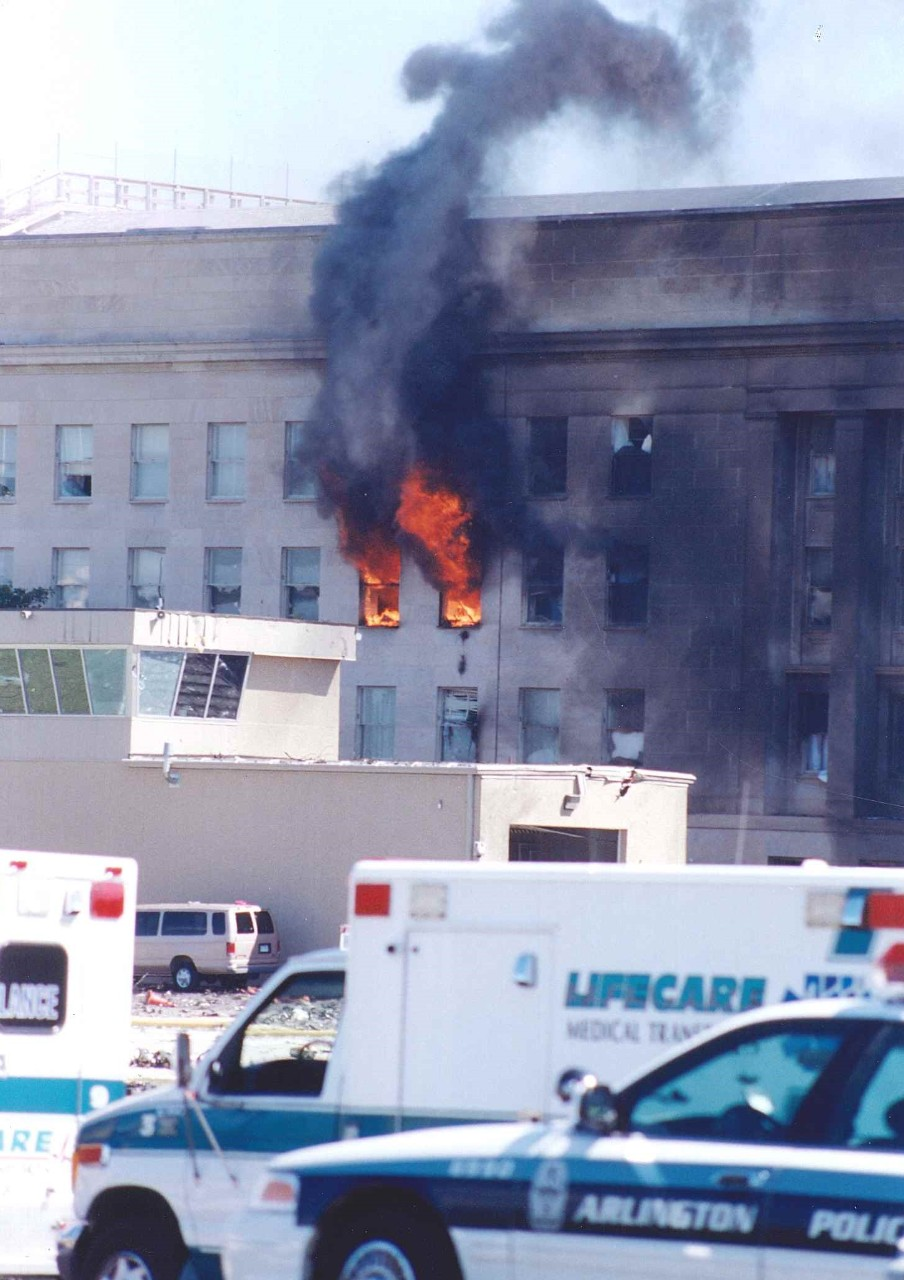

The ACPD was created on February 1, 1940, as the Arlington County Division of Police with Harry Woodyard as the first Chief of Police. A few years later, the first ACPD auxiliary force was created.

In 1960, Arlington County Police arrested people for violating Virginia's segregation and anti-miscegenation laws.

On October 1, 1963, after a departmental reorganization, the agency assumed its present name.

In September 2001, the Arlington County P.D. responded to the Pentagon after terrorists attacked it during the September 11 attacks, as the building is located in the county.

In June 2020, Arlington County withdrew its personnel from the District of Columbia after Arlington County Police Department officers were involved in an incident in which protesters were forcefully cleared from Lafayette Park. An Arlington County Police Department captain was later named in a federal lawsuit related to the incident.

In September 2020, Charles "Andy" Penn became Acting Chief of Police following the retirement of former Chief of Police Murray Jay Farr. On June 4, 2021, Penn was appointed to be the permanent Chief of Police by Arlington County Manager Mark Schwartz. Farr had served as Chief of Police since 2015.

== Line of duty deaths ==
Since the establishment of the Arlington County Police Department, 7 officers have died in the line of duty, the most recent in 2016 as a result of an illness caused by the September 11 attacks of 2001.

== Gallery ==
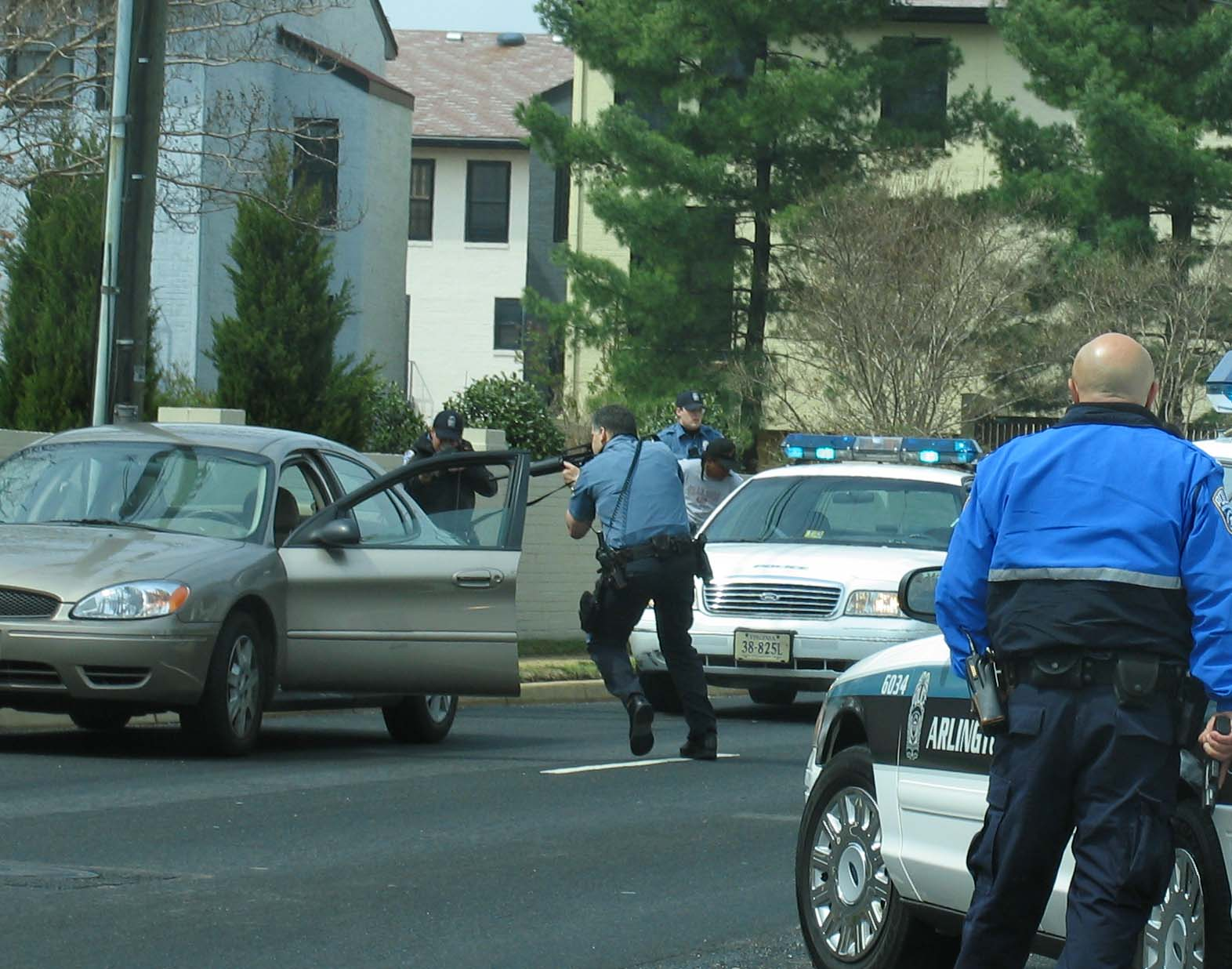
ACPD policemen apprehending a bank robber in 2006

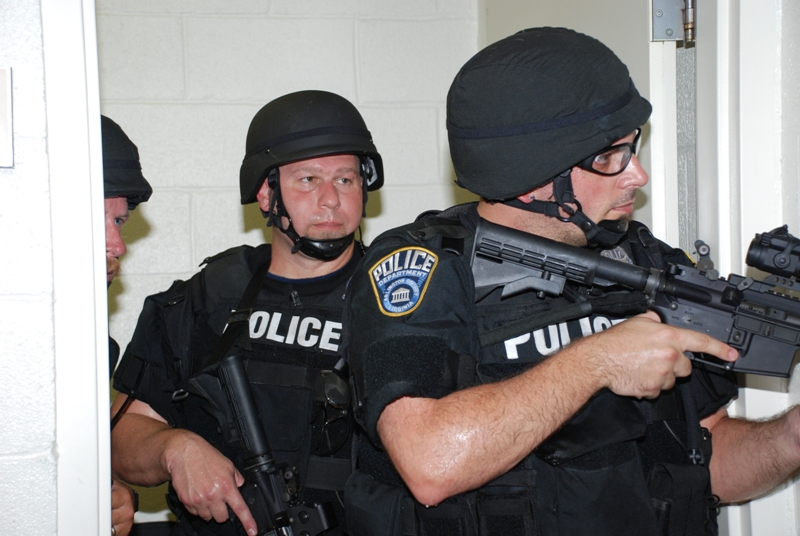
ACPD SWAT officers in 2007

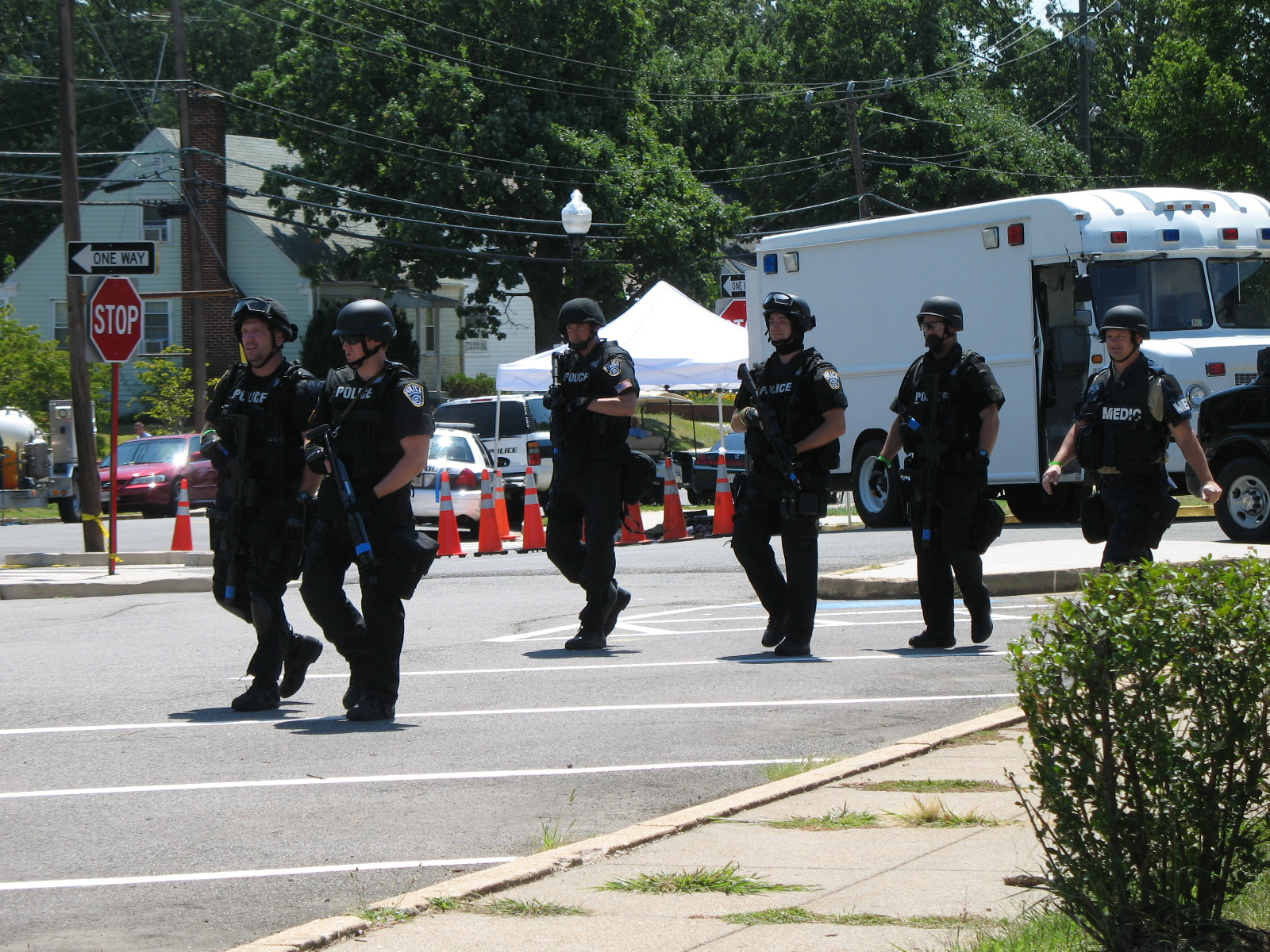
ACPD SWAT officers in 2008

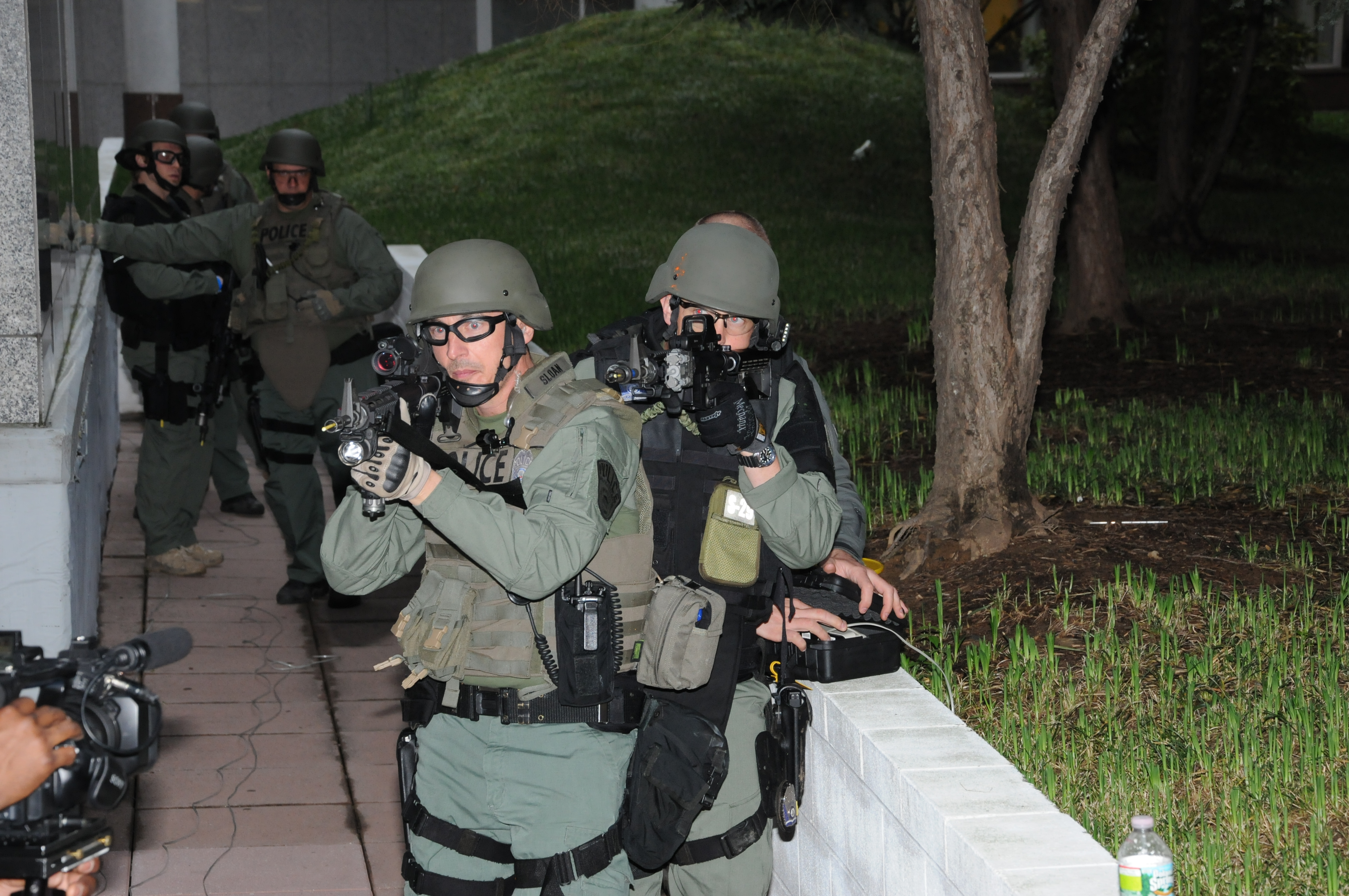
ACPD SWAT officers in 2012

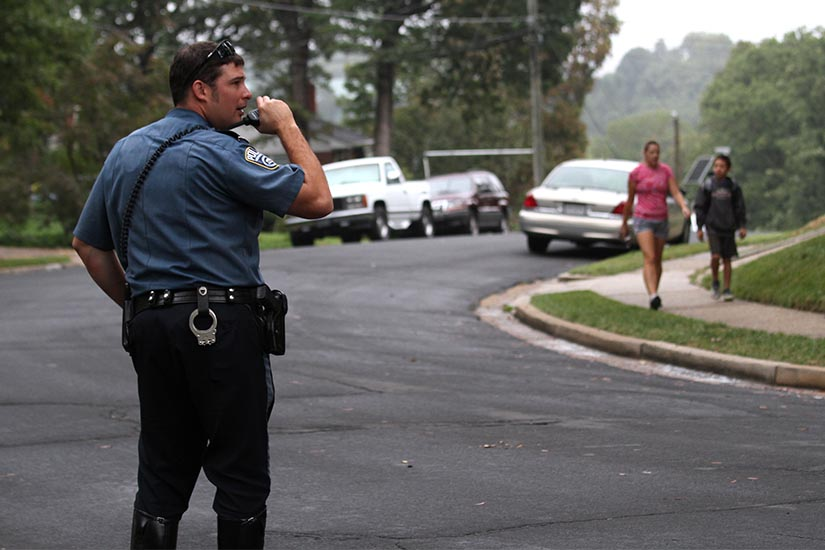
An ACPD policeman supervising schoolchildren in 2012

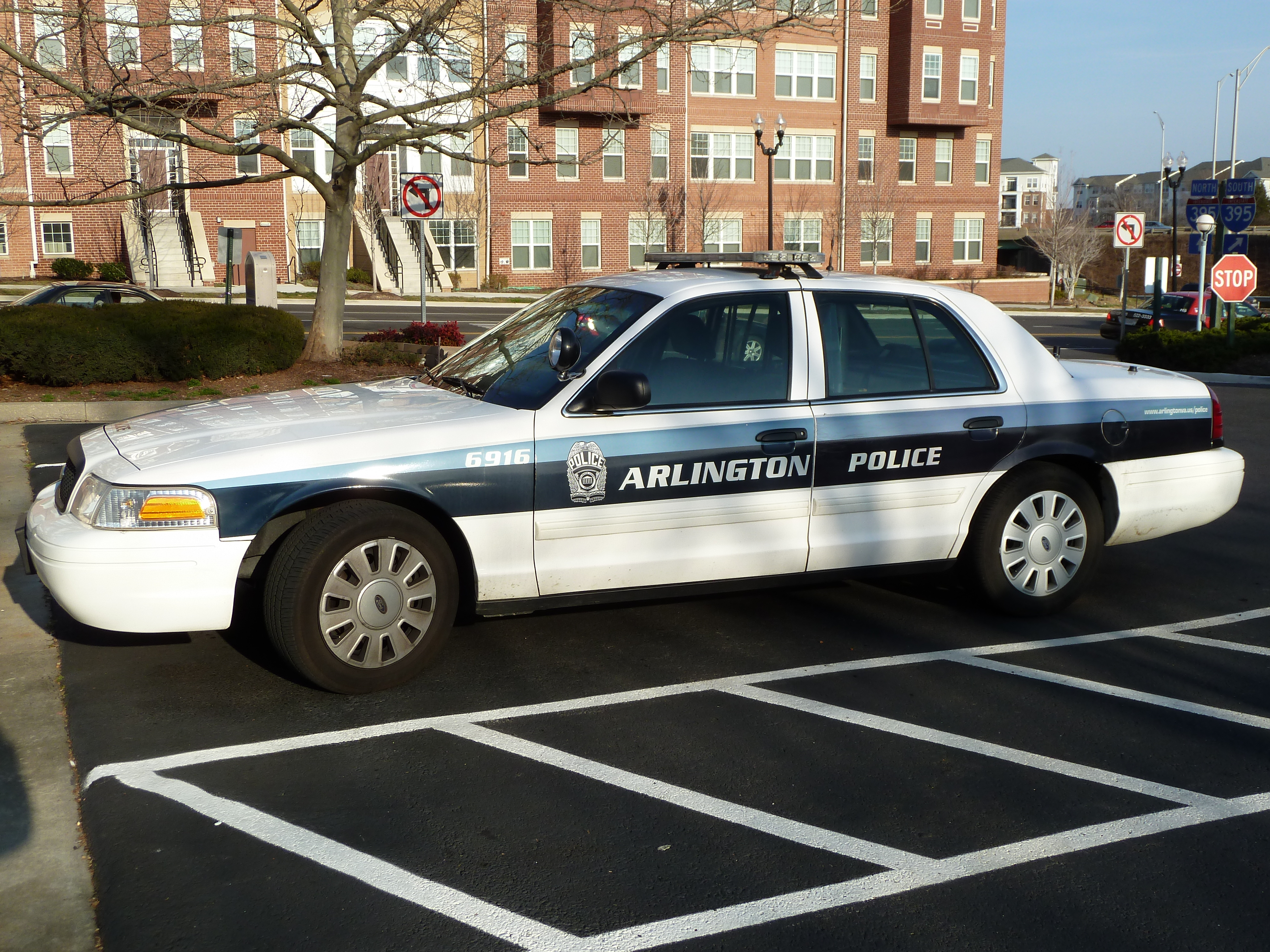
ACPD Ford Crown Victoria

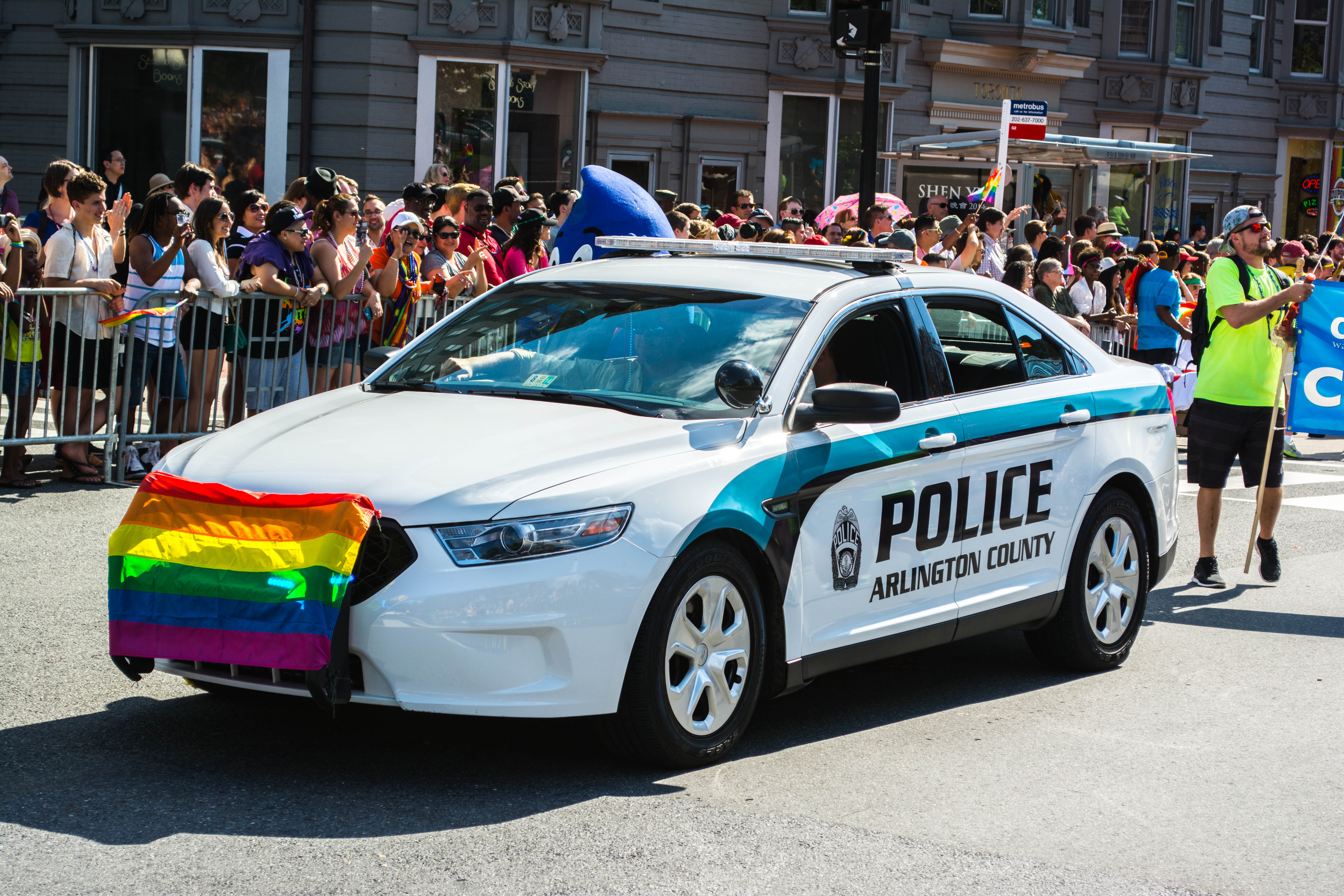
ACPD police car at Capital Pride

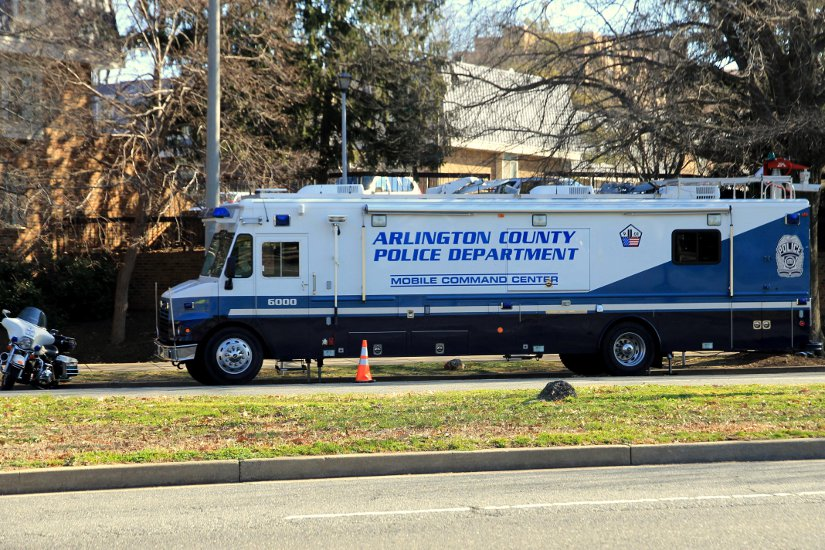
An ACPD mobile command post in 2012

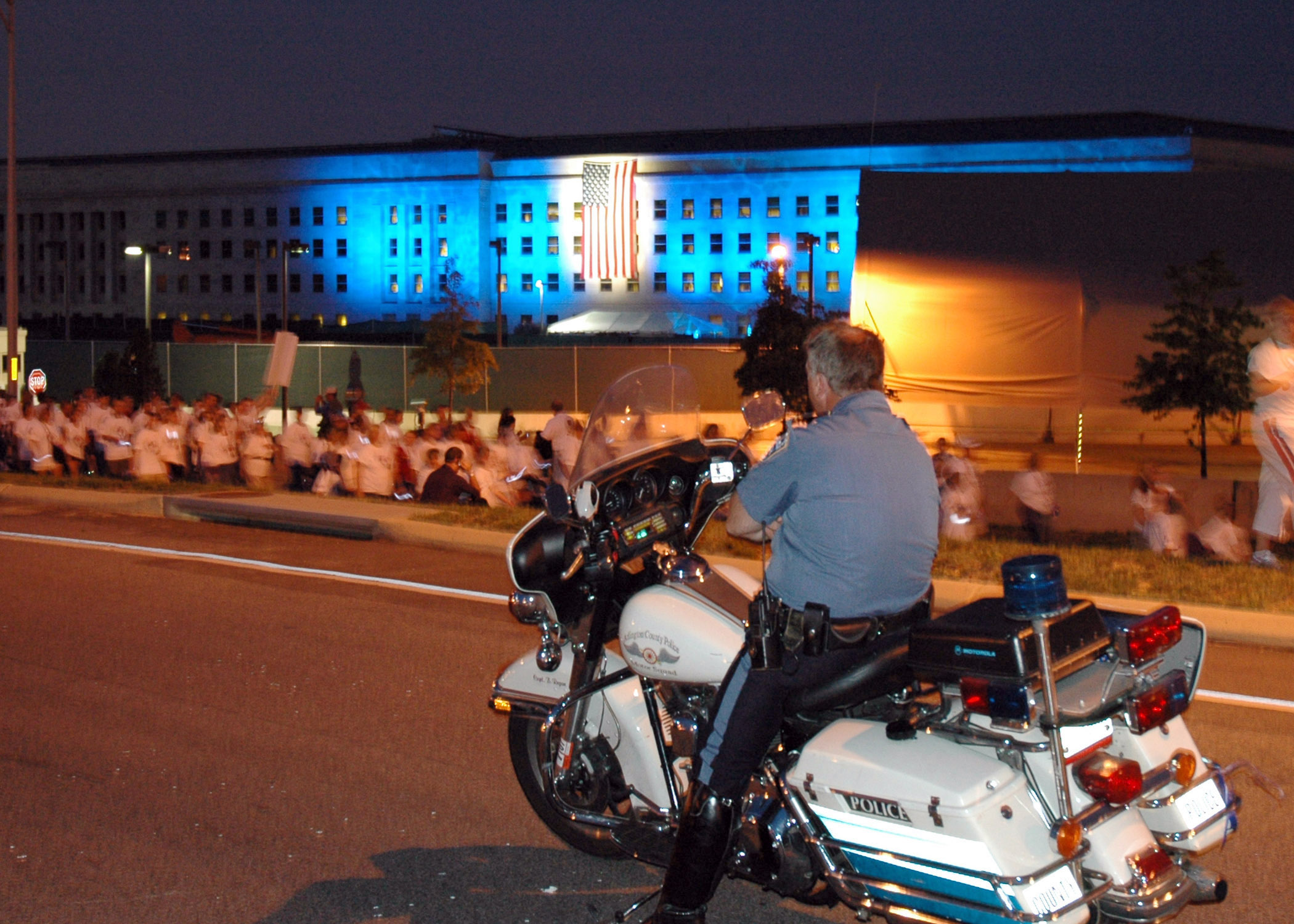
An ACPD motorcycle unit in front of the Pentagon in 2006

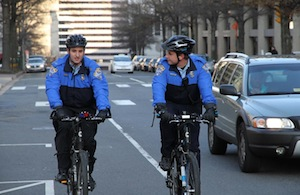
An ACPD bicycle unit on patrol in 2010

== See also ==
- List of law enforcement agencies in Virginia
- Arlington County Sheriff's Office
