= Arthur Ashe Monument =

Monument in Richmond, Virginia, U.S.

- The monument in 2015
- Artist: Paul DiPasquale
- Year: 1996
- Medium: Bronze sculpture
- Subject: Arthur Ashe
- Dimensions: 8.5 m (28 ft); 3.7 m (12 ft; sculpture only)
- Location: Richmond, Virginia, U.S.; 37.5651°N 77.4790°W

The Arthur Ashe Monument is a bronze sculpture by Paul DiPasquale installed along Richmond, Virginia's Monument Avenue. The statue depicts tennis player Arthur Ashe, who was born, raised and buried in Richmond.

== Description ==
The statue is situated on a 16-foot granite pedestal on a traffic island, at the intersection of Monument Avenue and Roseneath Road. The 12-foot tall bronze sculpture depicts Arthur Ashe holding a tennis racket in one hand and books in the other, surrounded by children. The books are raised higher than the tennis racket; this was requested by Ashe himself, as he tended to emphasize education over sports. Ashe's depiction faces west and the children face east.

== Background ==
=== Arthur Ashe ===
Ashe was born at Richmond's St. Philip Hospital for Negroes on March 10, 1943. During his childhood, Richmond was segregated, and he was denied entry to tennis tournaments and was not allowed to practice on the city's best courts. In 1960, Ashe moved to St. Louis to attend Sumner High School. In the following years, Ashe would become the first black player selected to the United States Davis Cup team (1963), and was the only black man to win the singles title at the US Open (1968), the Australian Open (1975), and Wimbledon (1975) tennis tournaments. He retired in April 1980. Following his death of AIDS-related pneumonia on February 6, 1993, Ashe's body lay in state at Virginia's Executive Mansion, located in Richmond.

=== Monument Avenue ===
At the time of the statue's construction, Monument Avenue had statues of several Generals of the Confederate States Army, as well as Confederate States Navy Commander Matthew Fontaine Maury and Confederate President Jefferson Davis. Among the tallest were the Robert E. Lee Monument, which stood 21 feet tall atop a 40-foot pedestal, and the Davis Memorial, which sat on a 65-foot column. The monuments, constructed from 1890 to 1929, were likely influenced by the then-popular belief that the Confederacy was just and heroic, an ideology also referred to as the Lost Cause of the Confederacy.

== History ==
DiPasquale met Ashe in 1992 when Wyatt Kingston introduced them, and received permission to design a statue of him. Nine crayon and pencil studies of Ashe were created before his death in 1993. Following his death, Ashe's widow Jeanne Moutoussamy-Ashe approved the studies, and recommended Virginia Heroes Incorporated for funding. The designs were first unveiled, in plaster form, in December 1994 at the Ashe Center.

With the urging of City Manager Robert Bobb, the Richmond City Council approved the placement of the statue on Monument Avenue in June 1995. This decision was met with opposition by both black and white people, both objecting to its placement beside statues of Confederate generals. One alternative location, supported by Mayor Leonidas B. Young II, was in the formerly whites-only Byrd Park.

On July 17, city council held an eight hour long hearing on the location of the statue, eventually voting 7-0 in favor of the Monument Avenue location. Several council members said that the hearing changed their opinions on the matter, especially comments by Ashe's brother and widow. The groundbreaking was eventually held on August 15. 500 attended the event, and several people raised Confederate flags behind the stage.

On January 1, 1996, the Richmond Times-Dispatch published a letter by Moutoussamy-Ashe. In the letter, she argued that the monument "honors Richmond, Virginia, more than it does its son, his legacy, and his life's work." According to Moutossamy-Ashe, her husband had expected the monument to go in front of an African-American sports hall-of-fame. Several days later, Moutoussamy-Ashe reached an agreement with Citizens for Excellence in Public Art, a group led by gallery owner Beverly Reynolds, wherein both parties would help raise $20 million for the envisioned hall-of-fame, and the DiPasquale statue would be moved there upon completion. At this point, CEMA would hold a $1 million international competition to find a better design to be placed at Monument Avenue. The group had raised $200 thousand by the time Richmond City Council shot their plan down.

The statue was cast by DiPasquale in Waynesboro, Virginia and shipped to Richmond on a flatbed truck driven by Robbie Drumheller. The statue was placed upon its pedestal on July 3, 1996, and unveiled on July 10.

=== George Floyd protests ===
On July 1, 2020, amid the George Floyd protests, Mayor Levar Stoney ordered all statues to Confederate generals on city property taken down; as a result, the only statue remaining on Monument Avenue is that of Ashe.

On July 16, the pedestal of the monument was vandalized with spray paint reading "White Lives Matter" and "WLM." A man claiming to be the vandal spoke to passers-by, saying "You put it on our statues, I'll put it on yours." Ashe's family gave the city of Richmond permission to remove the statue if this was needed to protect it from further harm; this was initially misreported as a request to remove the statue.

== Reception ==
In 2017, Mental Floss named the monument #3 on its listicle "10 Unintentionally Horrifying Statues of Famous People," writing that Ashe was "frozen forever in a state of seemingly mocking [the children] for their lack of height." When reached out to by Salon, sculptor DiPasquale said that "If you always see what you always saw, you will always get what you always got," and that "judging art, like life, depends on what you bring to it, I'm sure."
