= Lee Medical Building =

Historic building in Virginia, US

- U.S. National Register of Historic Places
- Virginia Landmarks Register
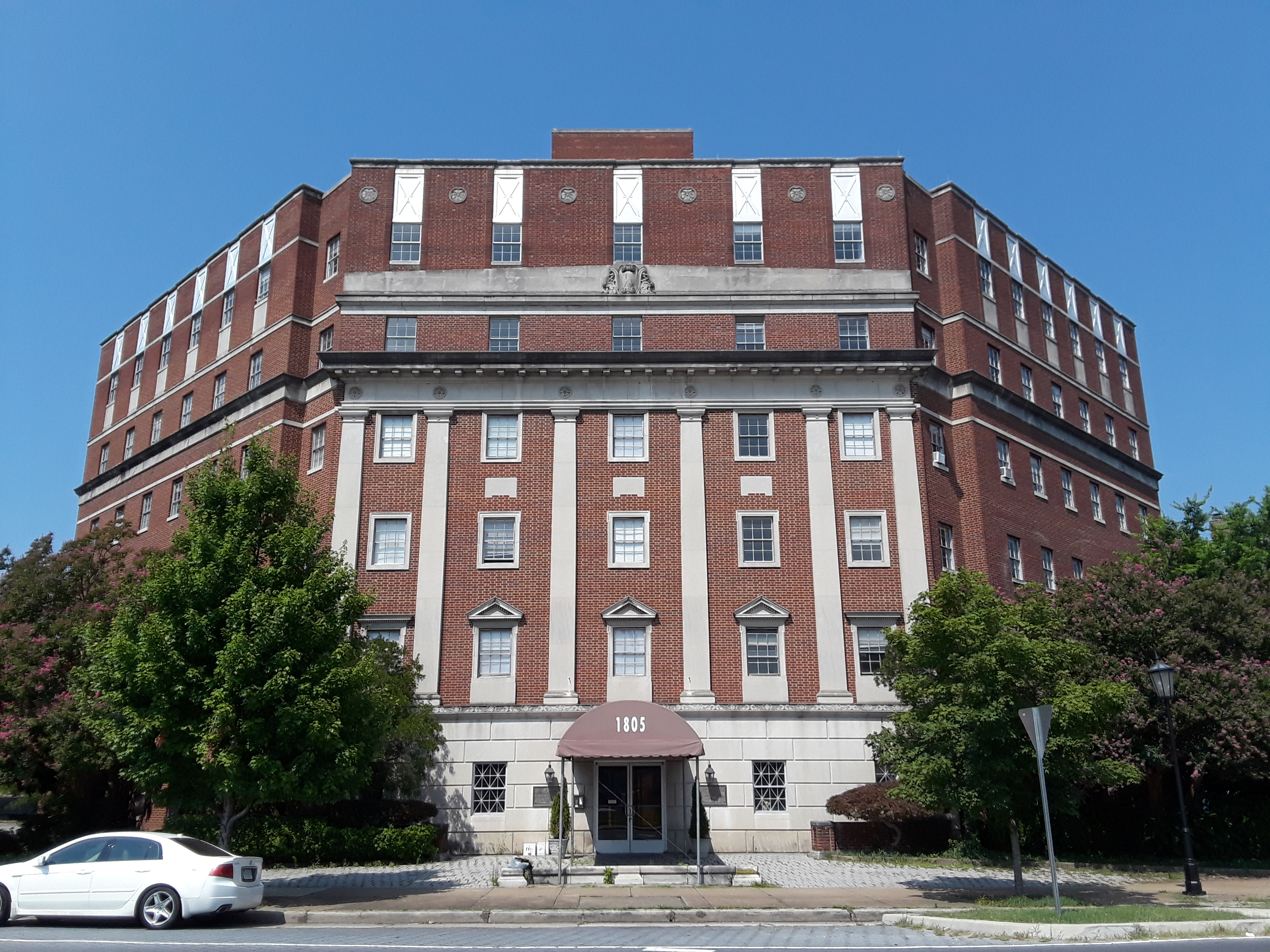
- Lee Medical Building in 2018

- Location within Virginia Location within the United States
- Location: 1805 Monument Avenue, Richmond, Virginia
- Coordinates: 37°33′14″N 77°27′39″W
- Area: 0.3979 acres (0.1610 ha)
- Built: 1952
- Architect: W. Harrison Pringle
- Architectural style: Colonial Revival
- NRHP reference No.: 100002356
- VLR No.: 127-0174-0393

Significant dates
- Added to NRHP: April 17, 2018
- Designated VLR: December 14, 2017

The Lee Medical Building is a historic office building located in Richmond, Virginia. It was constructed in 1952, and is a six-story, 40,000-square-foot (3,700 m^{2}) building designed in the Colonial Revival style. The building occupies a prominent site on Monument Avenue in the city, located on a corner lot across from and facing the since-removed Robert E. Lee Monument, and was the first commercial building on that primarily residential street.

It resides within the Monument Avenue Historic District, but was built outside of that area's period of significance and so is not a contributing structure. The office building itself was listed to the National Register of Historic Places in 2018.

== History ==
The history of Monument Avenue dates to 1887, when it was decided to place a monument to Robert E. Lee in a field west of the city of Richmond. The area surrounding the monument was platted and sold to speculators, and city services were extended to the vicinity, but the panic of 1893 cooled the real estate market. Though the monument to Lee was dedicated in 1890, it was 1903 before the first house was built on Monument Avenue.

The majority of the street and surrounding neighborhoods had been developed by the early 1940s. A number of the lots located around the avenue's statues were undeveloped, however, which may have been due to their irregular shape as well as a hesitancy to reside in such high profile locations. By 1950, the southwest portion of Lee Circle was empty, its property lines demarcated by a hedge.

In that year, the land came under the ownership of Franklin A. Trice, a Richmond-area developer who had previously worked on numerous residential projects in the city. Trice recognized the need for medical office space in the newly developed district, and decided to build a five-story tower for that purpose in Lee Circle. He met significant opposition to the proposal from area residents concerned about the effect of the office building on their property values. Previous changes to local zoning laws allowed for such development, however, though the building would be the first commercial structure on Monument Avenue. Trice's first attempt at obtaining a building permit was denied for not allowing enough of a setback from the road and neighboring structures. To remedy this issue, Trice had his architect, W. Harrison Pringle, reduce the design's square footage per floor and add a sixth story. The modification was approved, and Trice received his permit in June 1950.

Pringle's final design was for a multi-faceted, seven-sided building arranged to take advantage of the site's wedge-shaped layout. It was done in the Colonial Revival style, faced with brick and limestone, with six broad limestone pilasters separating the front facade's five bays. The facade is further decorated with carved dogwood blossoms as well as a shield displaying both the caduceus and the Rod of Asclepius.

The building's interior was constructed with six symmetrical, nearly identical floors containing suites of offices intended for medical and dental professionals. The offices were occasionally modified and renovated to accommodate their various tenants, but generally included space for reception and waiting, examination and operating rooms, and laboratories.

In addition to opposition to the building's initial permit, Trice also met considerable resistance to his attempt to open a pharmacy on the structure's ground floor. Neighborhood residents, concerned that a soda fountain would operate in the pharmacy, feared the facility would attract "teen-agers and bobby-soxers". While the zoning ordinance allowed for "uses customarily incident" to the building's operation, which Trice argued a pharmacy qualified as, the courts determined that the pharmacy's additional function of selling soda and candy was overly broad and did not qualify.

In 1953, just over a year after its opening, Trice sold the medical building to a consortium of doctors for the price of $750,000. The building had sufficient occupancy that no tenants were forced out of the building due to its sale. Within a decade of opening the building was home to roughly 60 separate practices. As the 20th century progressed and medical professionals required larger spaces, those tenants vacated the building and were gradually replaced by practices such as massage therapy and mental health treatment.

The building was listed to the National Register of Historic Places in 2018. In 2019, the property was again the center of a permit debate when a city councilwoman objected to the site's potential conversion into apartments. The following year, Lee Circle was the location of numerous protests in the wake of the murder of George Floyd. In June of that year, following a candlelight vigil celebrating Juneteenth at the site, an airport security officer was arrested at the Lee Medical Building. He had been seen on the roof of the then-vacant building, and was armed with a handgun when police arrived. The man was charged with trespassing but the police found that the gun was carried lawfully.
