= North Thompson Street Historic District =

Historic district in Virginia, United States

- U.S. National Register of Historic Places
- U.S. Historic district
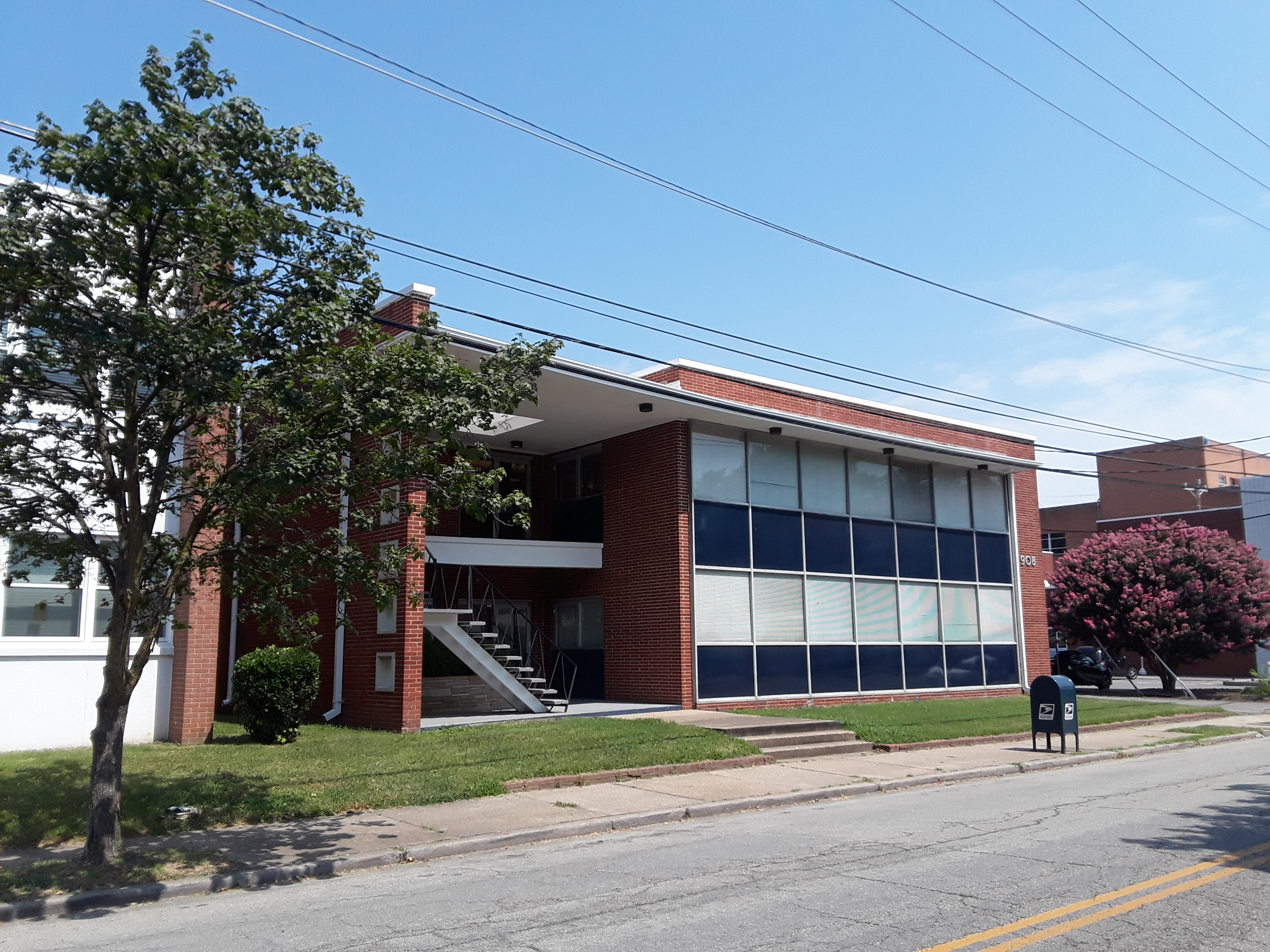

- Location within Virginia Location within the United States
- Location: N. Thompson St. between Broad St. and Monument Ave., Richmond, Virginia
- Coordinates: 37°34′2″N 77°28′46″W
- Area: 5 acres (2.0 ha)
- Built: 1955-59
- Architectural style: International Style
- NRHP reference No.: 100001644
- Added to NRHP: September 18, 2017

The North Thompson Street Historic District encompasses a collection of six International Style commercial buildings on North Thompson Street, between Monument Avenue and Broad Street, in Richmond, Virginia, United States. All are built of steel, brick, and concrete, and feature expanses of glass and asymmetrical plans. They were built between 1955 and 1959, as part of a buffer zone of "quiet commerce" between the Beltline Expressway on one side and the residential area on the other.

The district was listed on the National Register of Historic Places in 2017.

== See also ==
- National Register of Historic Places listings in Richmond, Virginia
