= Stonewall Jackson Monument =

Removed Confederate statue

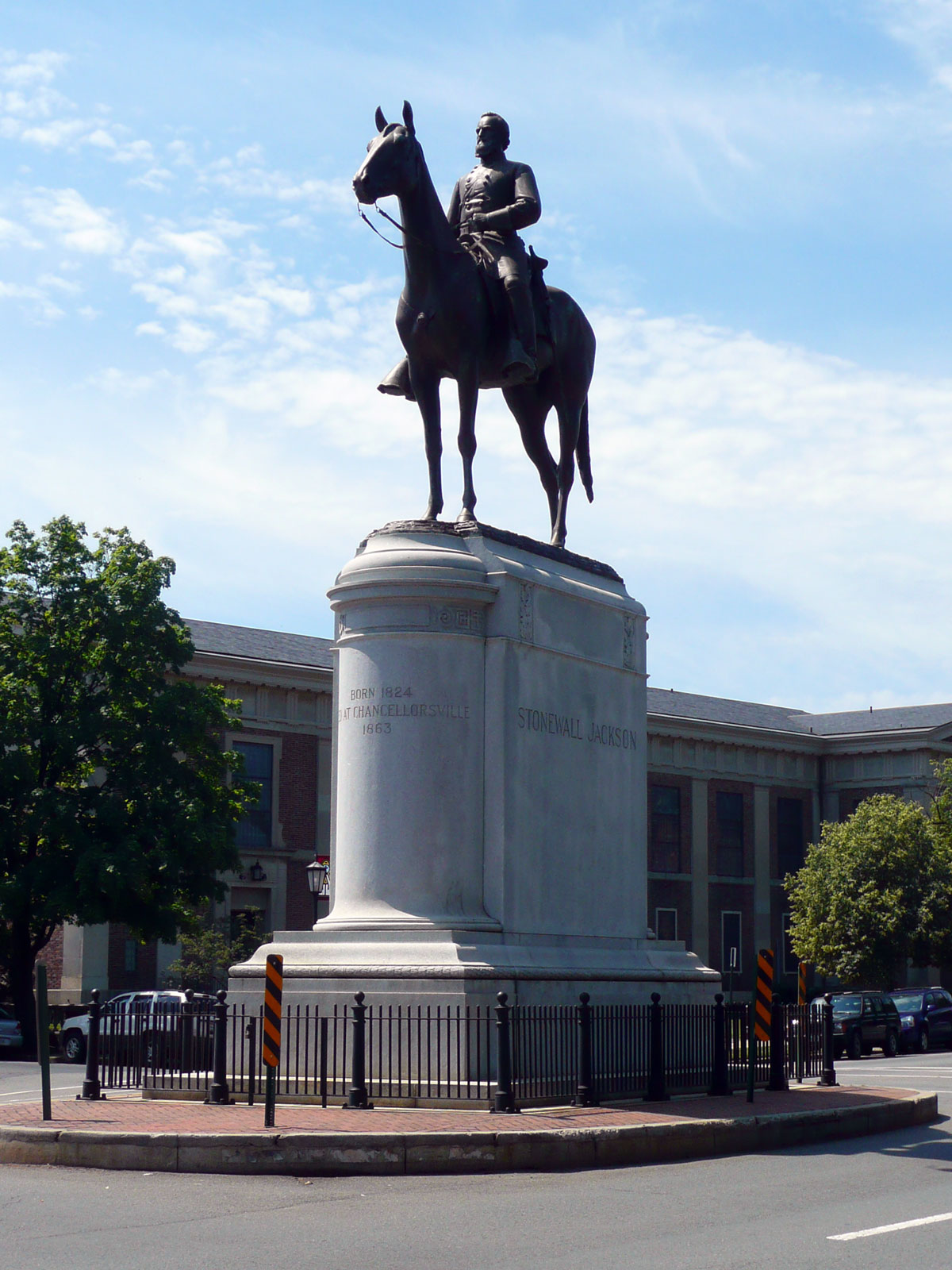
- Statue of Thomas 'Stonewall' Jackson in 2009
- Artist: Frederick William Sievers
- Year: 1919
- Completion date: 1919
- Medium: Bronze sculpture; granite (base)
- Subject: Stonewall Jackson
- Condition: Removed in July 2020
- Location: Richmond, Virginia, U.S.; 37.56063°N 77.47111°W

The Stonewall Jackson Monument in Richmond, Virginia, was erected in honor of Thomas Jonathan "Stonewall" Jackson, a Confederate general. The monument was located at the centre of the crossing of Monument Avenue and North Arthur Ashe Boulevard, in Richmond, Virginia. The bronze equestrian statue was unveiled in 1919. Along this avenue were other statues including Robert E. Lee, J. E. B. Stewart, Jefferson Davis, Matthew Maury and more recently Arthur Ashe. Thomas Jackson is best known as one of Robert E. Lee's most trusted commanders throughout the early period of the American Civil War between Southern Confederate states and Northern Union states. He rose to prominence after his vital role in the Confederate victory at the First Battle of Bull Run in July 1861, continuing to command troops until his untimely death on May 10, 1863, after falling fatally ill following the amputation of his wounded arm.

Several memorials were commissioned in his honor including the statue in Richmond, with perhaps the most well-known the Confederate Memorial Carving at Stone Mountain, commemorating Thomas Jackson, Robert E. Lee and Jefferson Davis. In Southern states, generals were often revered with statues erected for notable Confederate men at times satisfying a need of the Confederate states to extract virtues from past "heroes" and self-identify with them for the future, perpetuating the Lost Cause mythology. Many of these statues, including the Jackson monument in Richmond, have recently come into controversy in the aftermath of the murder of George Floyd and the renewed attention to Black Lives Matter (BLM) Movement that seeks to more accurately represent history and the racial inequalities black people continue to endure. Jackson's statue along with several others commemorating generals were either torn down by protesters supporting BLM or were removed on the mayor's orders during June and July 2020. Being polled for the issue among several organizations, state residents were split among full removal of the monuments and leaving them in place and adding informative context such as signage.

== Commissioning ==
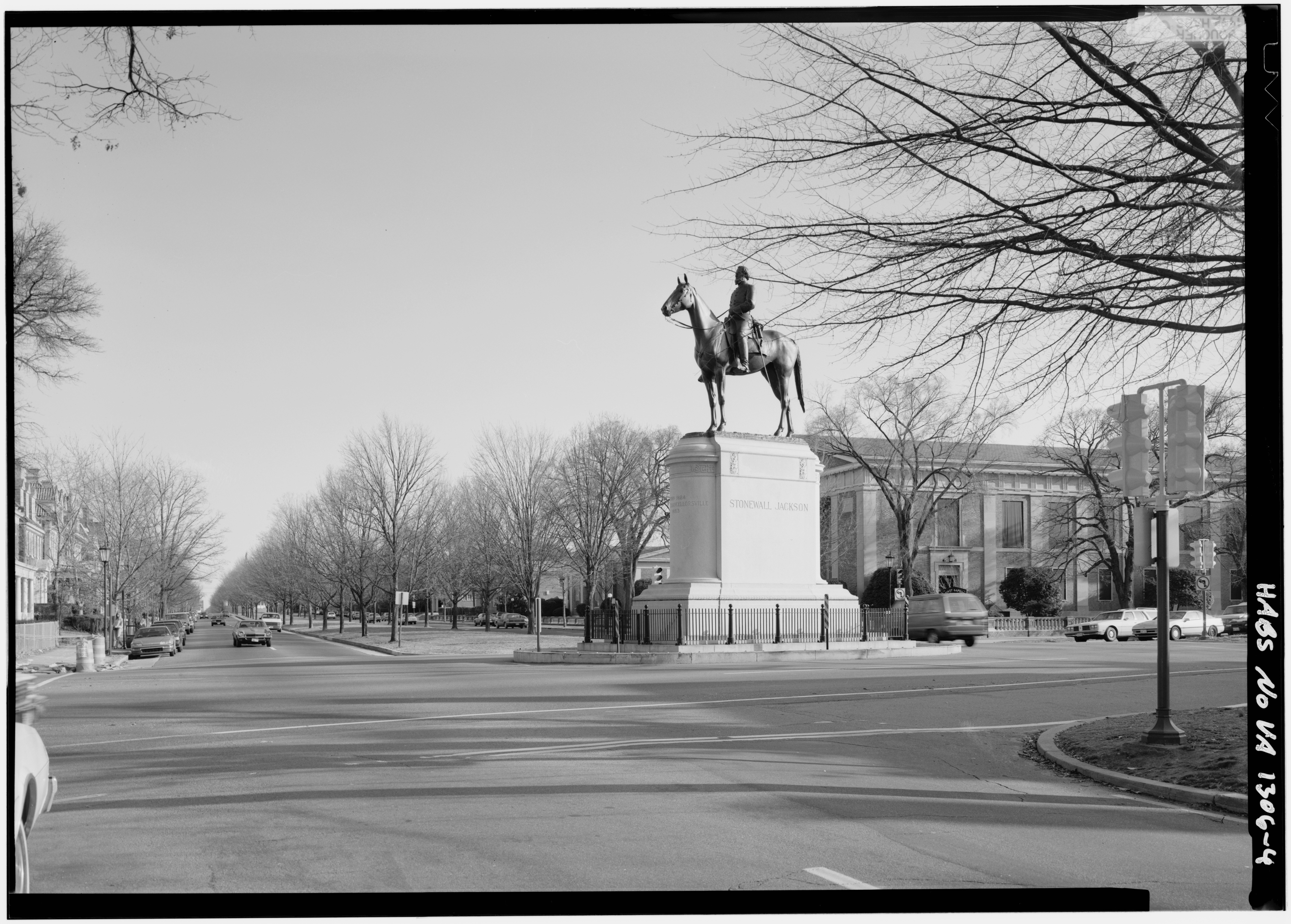
Picture of the monument with the First Baptist Church in the background, circa 1990

Under the supervision of local civic groups from 1890 till 1919 several statues were erected at successive street intersections along Monument Avenue in Richmond, commemorating great Confederate men. The 'Stonewall' Jackson statue like other statues along this Avenue were publicly funded. A local Richmond sculptor Frederick William Sievers, sculpted both Jackson's and Mathew Maury's statues. The first cornerstone of Jackson's monument was laid on June 3, 1915, with it being fully unveiled on October 11, 1919, shortly after the end of the First World War. The official commemorative service on October 11, 1919, was attended by the Governor of Richmond with Robert E. Lee's grandson speaking at the service, Thomas Jackson's granddaughter and the sculptor's son pulled the ropes to unveil the completed monument. This was followed by a parade of Virginia Military Institute cadets, Virginia National Guards and school children who marched to the newly unveiled monument. It was suggested that the timely completion of the statue, may be a reminder of the model 'young brave soldier' who were now returning from another major war.

== Significance ==
The statues were commission and erected along Monument Avenue from 1890 till 1919 as the narrative and support for the Confederate cause re-emerged. The commemoration of the Confederate leaders is one of the few times in history where a losing side in a national civil war had the platform during their lifetime to celebrate their cause. It highlights the Confederate states' desire and ability to raise memorials a generation after their failure to establish an independent slaveholding republic, representing a need to vindicate and legitimize the Confederate experience in American national history. The Confederate cause is commonly known as the Lost Cause which has come to describe the legitimization and, at times, the idealization of the Confederate motives to go to war against the Union states. This narrative sought to absolve Confederate states of charges of treason, legitimize their reasoning for going to war to maintain states' rights and sovereignty over its territory and people, primarily the continuation of slavery on the basis that it was just and ethical and to find moral victory in military defeat. The Lost Cause narrative further sought to minimize the centrality of slavery and white supremacy in the build-up and outbreak of the Civil War. Richmond was a focal point for the narrative of the Lost Cause with several of the most well-known Confederate men's statues along Monument Avenue in Lee, Jackson and Davis. These Confederate leaders were often depicted as brave and virtuous and were celebrated with parades and events occurring annually along Monument Avenue. Thomas Jackson is of particular importance to the Lost Cause, as he was one of the leading and most influential Confederate commanders until his death in 1863. The statues and monuments erected throughout Southern states are now widely seen as symbolizing the Lost Cause narrative thereby perpetuating racism and racist power structures within America, more prominently in Southern states.

== Removal ==
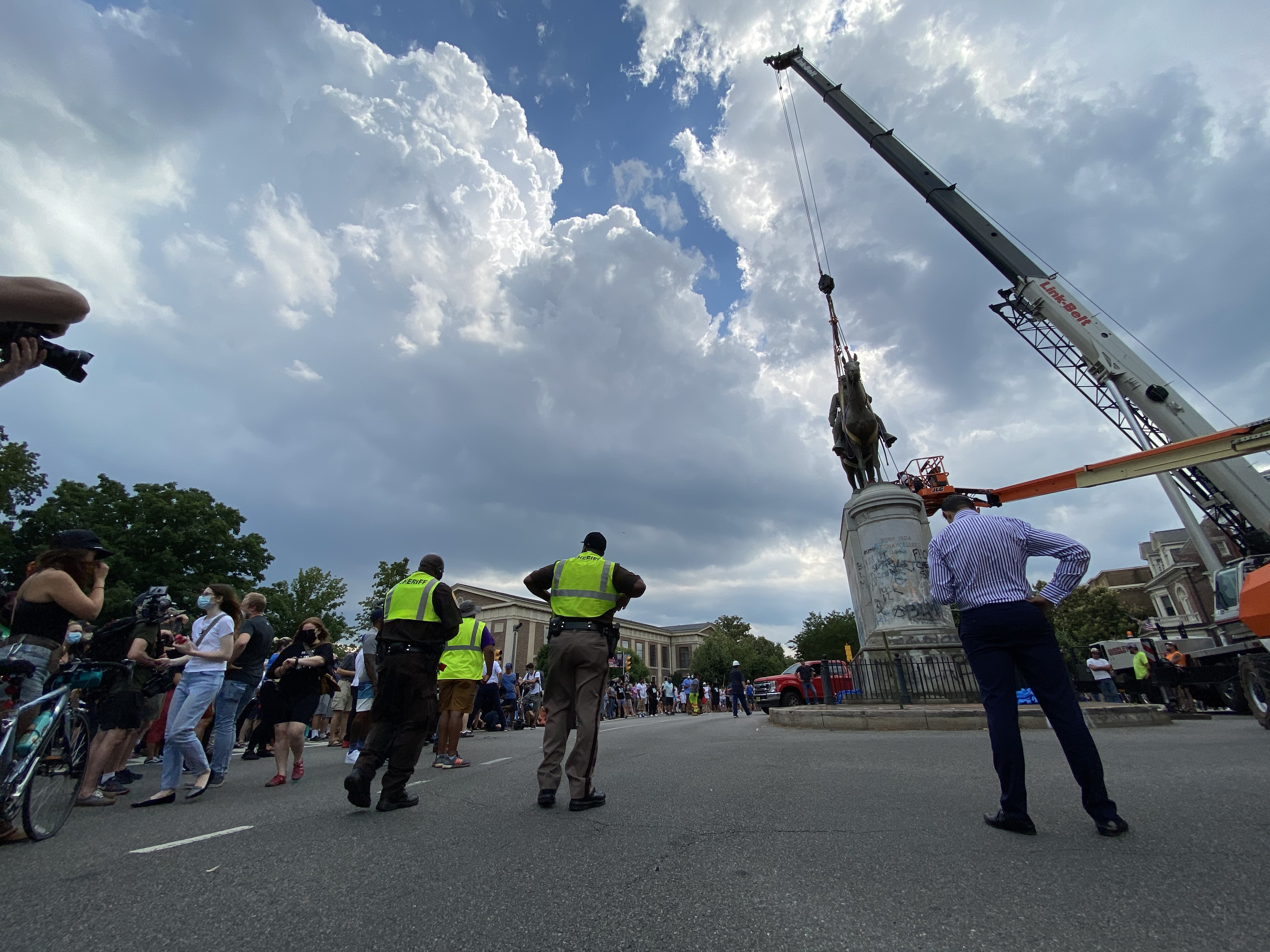
Removal of the Stonewall Jackson statue, on July 1, 2020

There was opposition to the commissioning of the statues along Monument Avenue from the very onset, with John Mitchell, a black city councilman, in the 1870s, strongly opposing paying tribute to "blood and treason" and paying for these statues with public funds. He vowed there would come a time when African Americans would be there to take these statues down. More recently, the statues on Monument Avenue came under scrutiny after the murder of George Floyd and the renewed global attention on the importance of the Black Lives Matter Movement. The movement was founded in 2013 in response to the acquittal of Trayvon Martin's killer. It aims "to eradicate white supremacy and build local power to intervene in violence inflicted on Black communities by the state and vigilantes". Through protesting, the BLM movement seeks to illustrate how statues of Confederate commanders came to symbolize the lack of freedom, liberty and justice black people had, historically and today. With Richmond being a focal point for celebration of the Confederate cause, BLM protests were extensive with great importance placed on the need to remove statues of Confederate generals, one of whom is Thomas Jackson. The statues are now widely viewed as paying tribute to the Lost Cause, particularly the gradual rationalization of the necessity of institutionalized slavery and the perpetuation of racial inequalities. As part of the BLM protests, Jackson's monument was vandalized and on July 1, 2020, the equestrian statue was removed on the mayor's orders, with the base the only remaining feature. His statue along with James Stewart, Jefferson Davis, Matthew Maury and later Robert E. Lee were removed while the Arthur Ashe monument is the only remaining one. The shifting status quo is perhaps best described in a letter to the Richmond Mayor, Levar Stoney and members of the Monument Avenue Commission from descendants of Thomas Jackson. They requested the removal of the Jackson statue as well as all Confederate statues along this Avenue as in their opinion they are overt symbols of racism and white supremacy and they recognize the need to stop commemorating symbols of racial injustice. This represented a global shift away from honoring figures who attempted to maintain great inequalities in society, as issues of racial injustice and discrimination are being addressed and publicly condemned.

One year and seven months after the removal of the statue, the vacant pedestal was also removed on 1 February 2022, and the site paved over to make it into an ordinary road junction.

== Design ==
The equestrian statue depicts the Confederate general, on his horse, Sorrel, holding the horse's reins in his left hand. The bronze sculpture measures 20 x 7 x 18 ft, with Mt. Airy granite base measuring 20 x 9 x 18 ft, surrounded by a wrought iron fence. There are oak leaves adorning the base of the statue which may reference the stoic nature of Jackson, while there is a Greek style art deco frieze lining the top of the base. The inscription on the east and west side of the granite base reads "STONEWALL JACKSON" while the inscription on the north side says "BORN 1824/DIED AT CHANCELLORSVILLE/1863". Jackson's statue faced north which some suggest reference as if to continue the fight.
