= Jefferson Davis Memorial (Richmond, Virginia) =

Former monument in Virginia, US

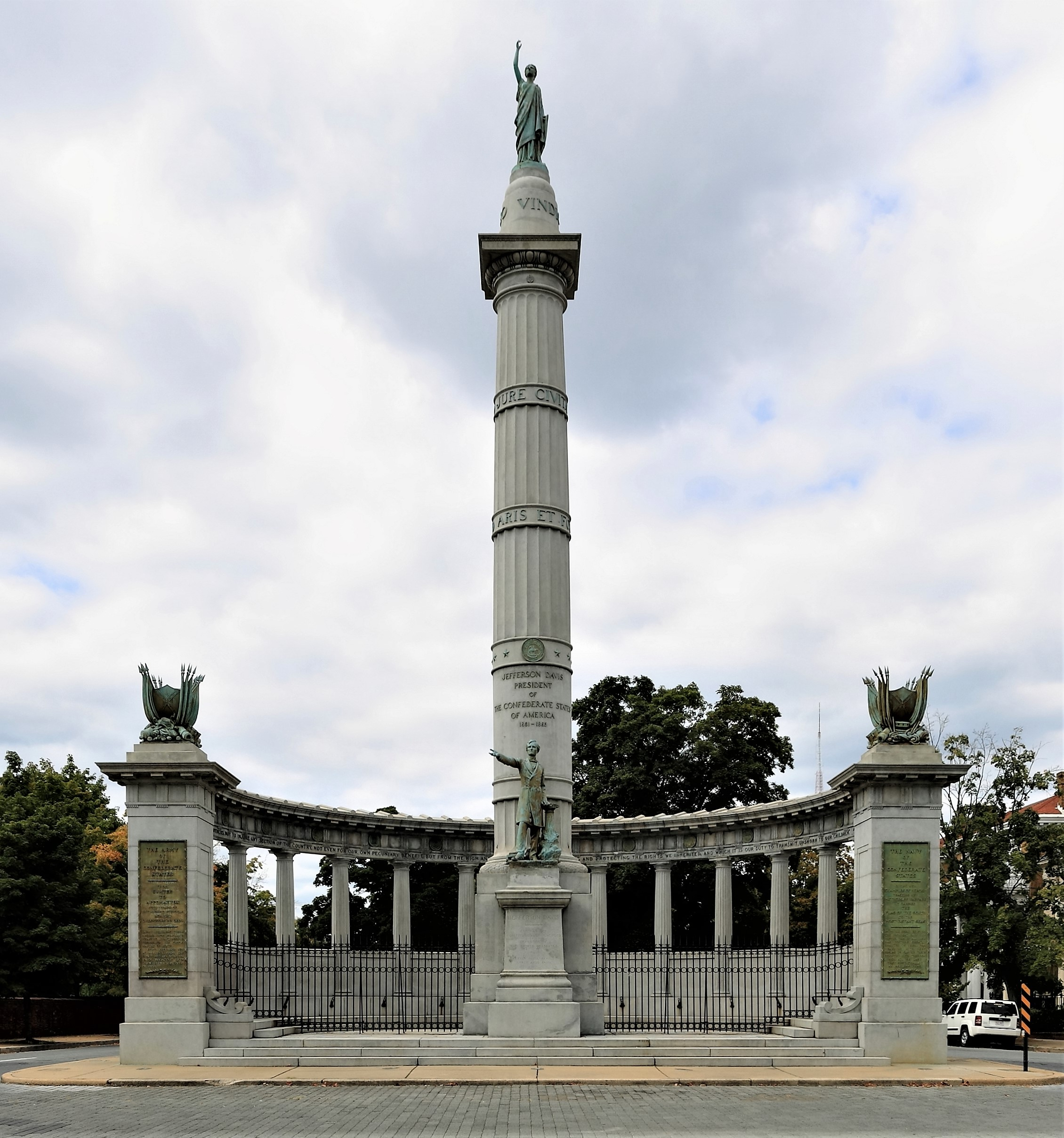
- (2013)
- Artist: statues: Edward Valentine
- Year: 1907
- Medium: statues: bronze
- Dimensions: Doric column: 67 feet (20 m) tall Colonnade: 50 feet (15 m) tall
- Condition: Entire monument removed
- Location: Richmond, Virginia, U.S.; 37°33′31″N 77°28′04″W

The Jefferson Davis Memorial was a memorial for Jefferson Davis (1808–1889), president of the Confederate States of America from 1861 to 1865, installed along Richmond, Virginia's Monument Avenue, in the United States. The monument was unveiled on Davis' birthday, June 3, 1907, a day celebrated in Virginia and many other Southern states as Confederate Memorial Day. It consisted of a bronze statue of Davis by Richmond sculptor Edward Valentine surrounded by a colonnade of 13 columns representing the Southern states, and a tall Doric column topped by a bronze statue, also by Valentine, representing Southern womanhood.

The statue of Davis was toppled by protesters during the George Floyd protests in June 2020. The rest of the monument was taken down in February 2022. Being polled for the issue among several organizations, state residents were split among full removal of the monuments and leaving them in place and adding informative context such as signage.

== Description ==
The east-facing monument sported a 67-foot-tall (20 m) Doric column topped by a female bronze figure called Vindicatrix, an allegorical representation of Southern womanhood. (Note: A souvenir book printed for the unveiling of the monument in 1907 described the statue as a representation of "the Vindicatrix ... the emblem of Southern womanhood ... the immortal spirit of her land shining unquenched within her eyes, and her hand uplifted in an eternal appeal to the God of justice and truth".) There were thirteen columns, eleven bronze seals representing the seceding states and two representing states that sent troops for the Confederacy. Two square piers at either end of the colonnade are topped with eagles and faced with plaques. The bronze statues, Vindacatrix and Jefferson Davis in the center – the latter situated atop a block of granite – were designed by Edward Virginius Valentine; the arrangement was planned by William C. Noland.

The statue of Davis shows him with an outstretched arm, lecturing from a history book. The frieze carries words Jefferson Davis spoke in his farewell address to the U.S. Senate on January 21, 1861.

This is done not in hostility to others, not to injure any section of the country, not even for our own pecuniary benefit; but from the high and solemn motive of defending and protecting the rights we inherited, and which it is our sacred duty to transmit unshorn to our children.

The plaque on the left end of the monument reads [both plaques originally all in caps]:

The Army of the Confederate States
------------------------------------------------
From Sumter to Appomattox four years of unflinching struggle against overwhelming odds
------------------------------------------------
Glory ineffable these around their dear land wrapping wrapt around themselves the purple mantle of death.
Dying, they died not at all, but, from the grave and its shadow, valor invincible lifts them glorified ever on high.

The plaque on the right end of the monument reads:

The Navy of the Confederate States
------------------------------------------------
Giving new examples of heroism teaching new methods of warfare it carried the flag of the South to the most distant seas
------------------------------------------------
If to die nobly be ever the proudest glory of virtue, this of all men has fortune greatly granted to them, for,
yearning with deep desire to clothe their country with freedom now at the last they rest full of an ageless fame

== History ==
During the many years required to raise the funds needed for the memorial, various designs and placements in the city were considered. Unveiled in 1907 on Confederate Memorial Day – June 3 – on what would have been Davis' 99th birthday, the monument was funded by the Jefferson Davis Monument Association and the United Daughters of the Confederacy. (Note: The United Confederate Veterans were originally in charge of raising funds, but requested the cooperation of the United Daughters of the Confederacy, who had a better track record of fund raising. The UDC agreed to help, but only if they were given full responsibility.) The unveiling was scheduled in conjunction with a reunion of the United Confederate Veterans, and attracted a large crowd of between 80,000 and 200,000 people. A parade of veterans followed by prayers and speeches preceded the unveiling, which was effected by one of Davis's daughters, Margaret Davis Hayes, and two of his grandchildren.

A local newspaper said of the memorial at the time, "The entire monument ... typifies the vindication of Mr. Davis and the cause of the Confederacy for which he stood before the world..."

"These objects are so powerful and were made for a very particular intention, for a group of people to try and convey their dominance over other free Americans. [...] To have them off of public streets where you can't consent, to into a public institution of education and learning, to me is only natural."

— Josh Epperson, co-curator of The Valentine museum

=== Removal ===
During the protests in the wake of the murder of George Floyd, the bronze statue of Davis was torn down by protesters on June 10, 2020.

The statue of Vindicatrix, representing Southern womanhood, on top of the central column, was removed by the City of Richmond on July 8, 2020.

The remainder of the monument, including the main column and colonnade, was dismantled altogether in February 2022. A time capsule was found while the work took place. No trace of the monument now remains on its original site.

The vandalized Davis statue was displayed at The Valentine in Richmond—a museum whose first president was Edward Virginius Valentine, the statue's sculptor—as part of the museum's This is Richmond, Virginia exhibit. The statue was on loan from the Black History Museum and Cultural Center of Virginia. It was displayed lying horizontally in its "2020 state": there is damage to the statue's head and right arm, and splatters of pink paint remain on the statue, as well as torn pieces of toilet paper around the statue's collar. Valentine curator Christina Vida stated that, "we wanted to make sure that paint stays applied. That the damage that occurred to it when it was pulled down by protesters that it stays just that way."

In 2025, the Davis statue and Vindicatrix were both included in the exhibition Monuments at the Museum of Contemporary Art, Los Angeles, alongside other decommissioned Confederate monuments and new works by contemporary artists.

== Gallery ==
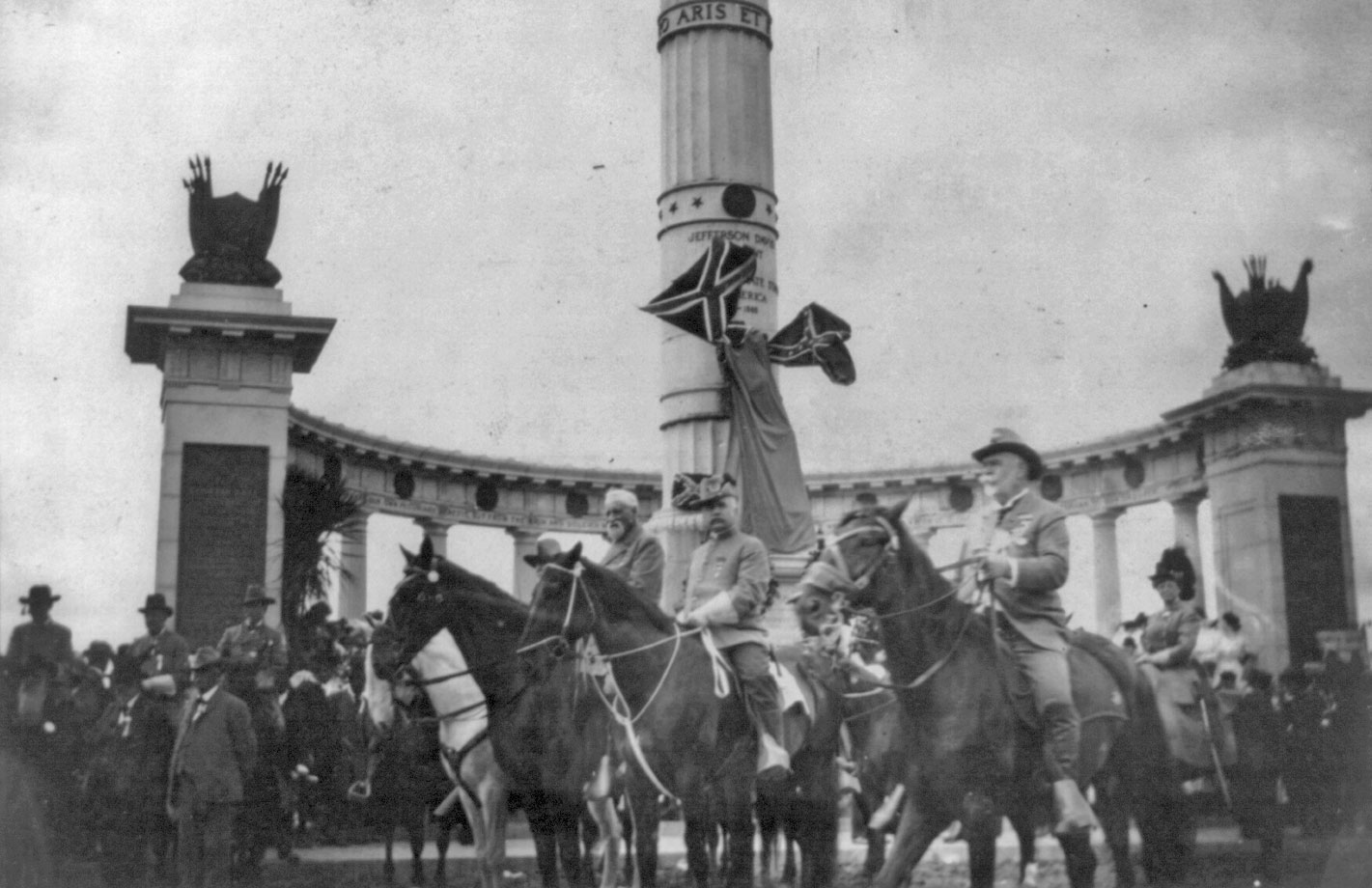
George Washington Custis Lee on horseback, with staff reviewing Confederate Reunion Parade on June 3, 1907, in front of the monument

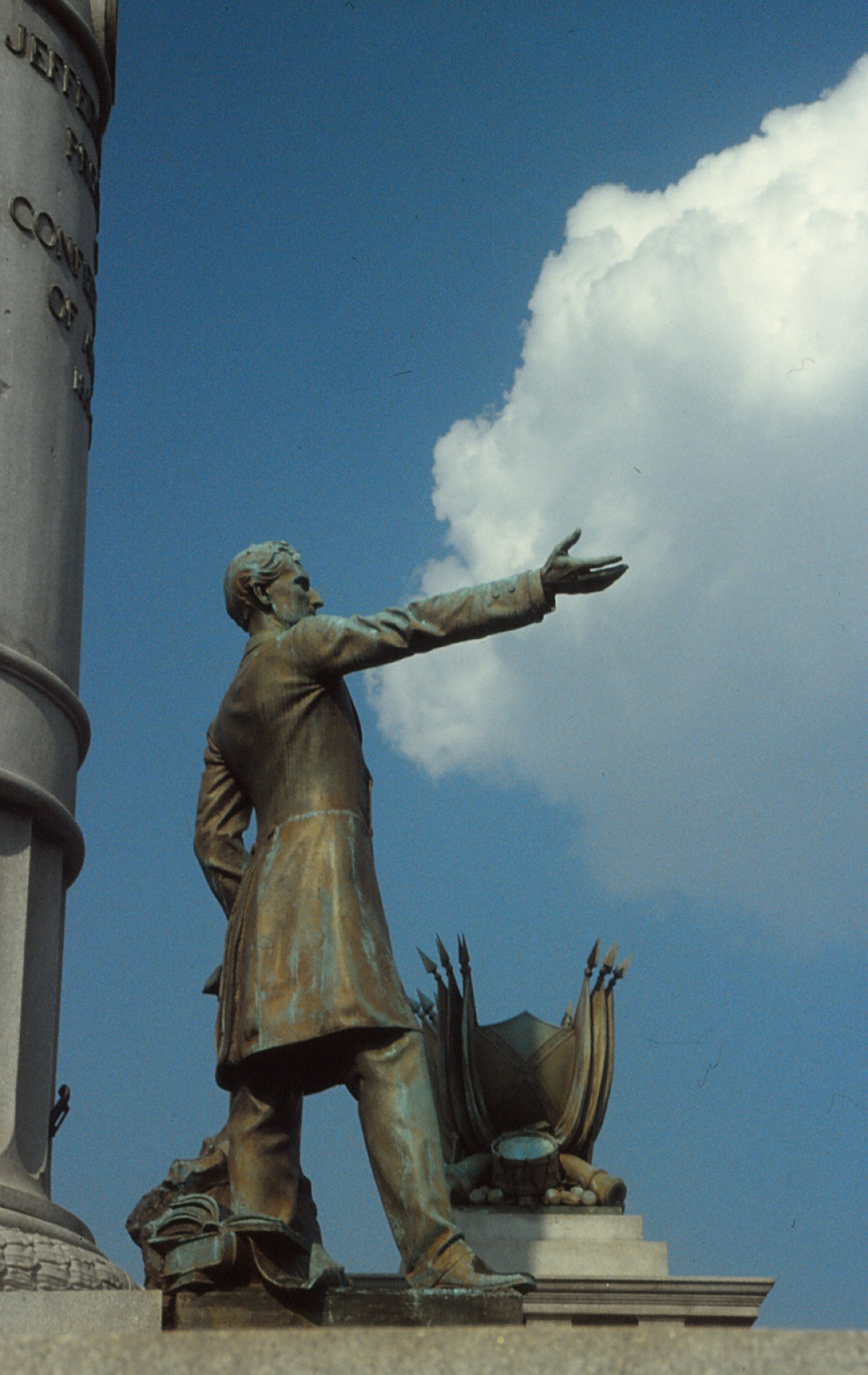
The statue as it appeared in 2018.

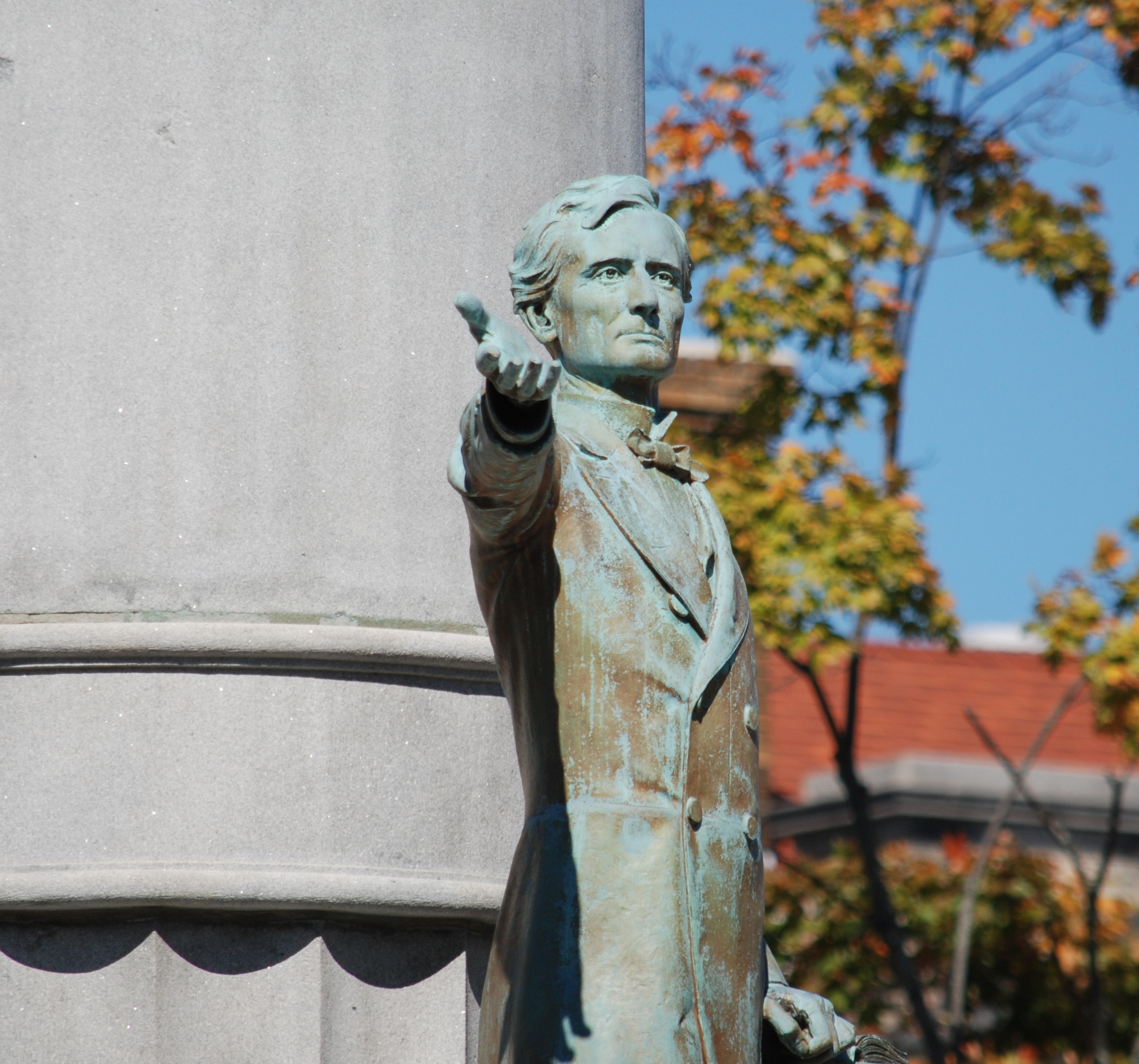
Detail of the statue of Jefferson Davis

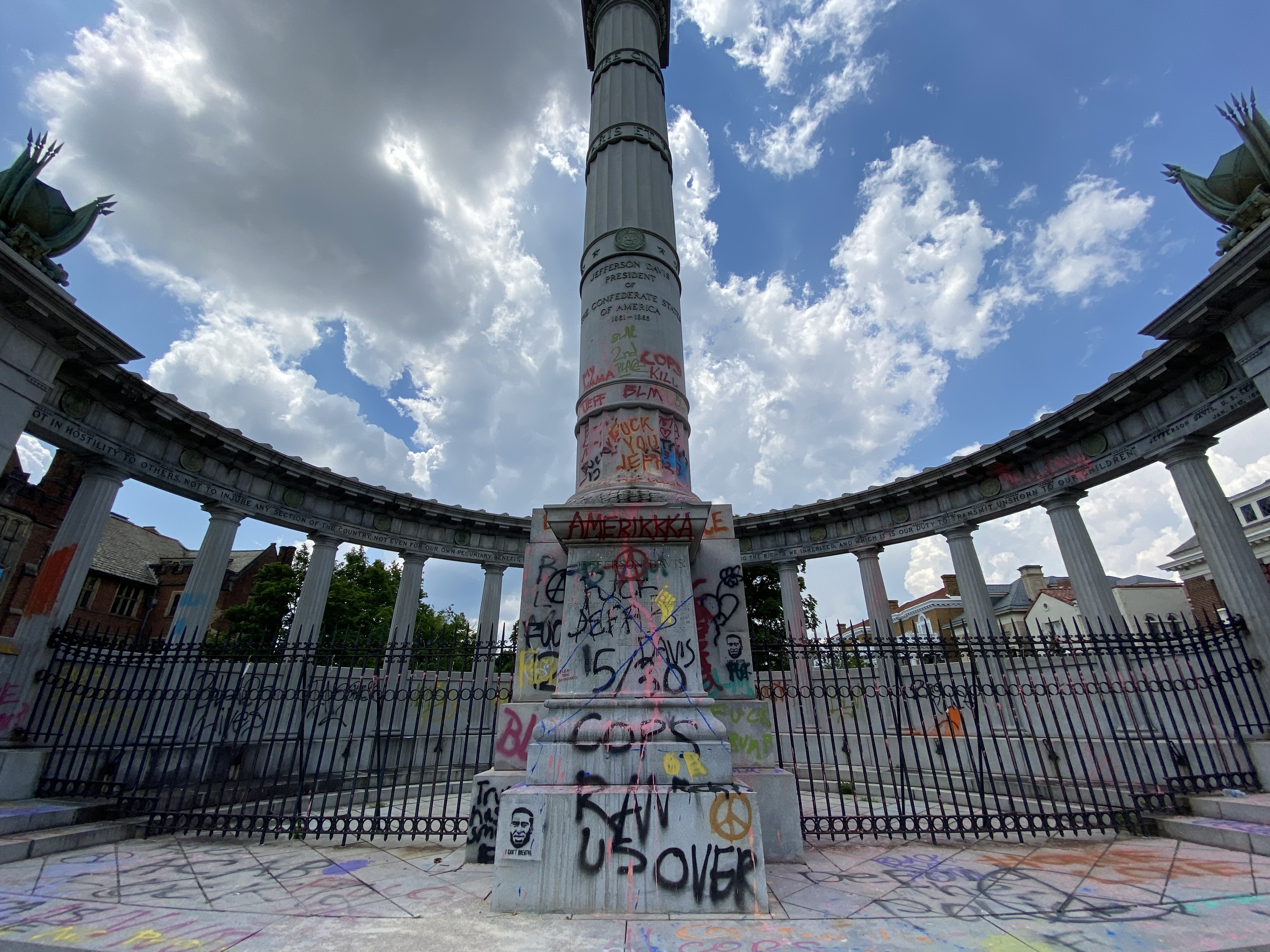
The memorial as it stood in July, 2020 after the removal of the Davis statue

== See also ==
- List of monuments and memorials removed during the George Floyd protests
