= Paul DiPasquale =

American sculptor

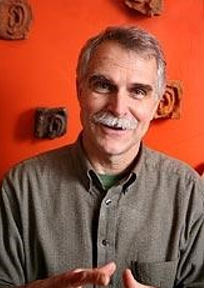
Paul DiPasquale at his exhibition Ears at art6 in Richmond

Paul DiPasquale is a sculptor living and working in Richmond, Virginia. He has designed several public sculptures in Virginia, including the Arthur Ashe Monument on Richmond's Monument Avenue and King Neptune on Virginia Beach's boardwalk.

== Education ==
DiPasquale's undergraduate degree was in the field of sociology with an art minor at the University of Virginia. He trained at the Boston Architectural College and received his Master's degree in sculpture from Virginia Commonwealth University in 1977. He has been associated as an instructor, resident artist, or visiting artist at Northern Virginia Community College, Maryland Institute, American Academy in Rome, International City of the Arts in Paris, William and Mary College and Virginia Commonwealth University.

== Career ==
DiPasquale's studio is located at his home in Fulton Hill. DiPasquale was twice a visiting sculptor at the American Academy in Rome.

In 2012, DiPasquale presented an exhibition, Ears, at art6 Gallery. He also participated in an event presented by Gasa Gasa, a Freret Street club in New Orleans. In Richmond, he participated in gallery exhibitions at Art6 and Artspace.

=== Public works ===
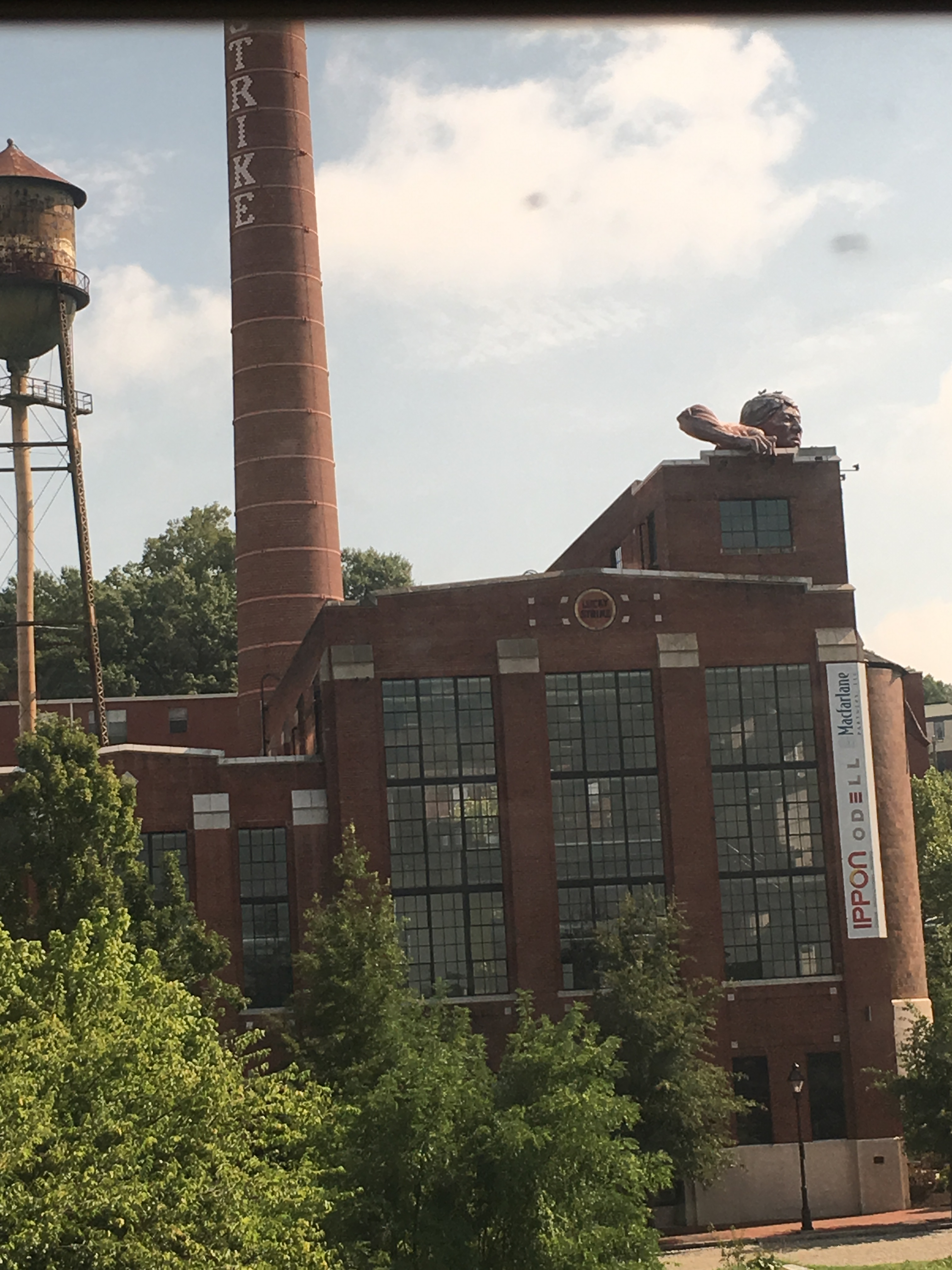
Connecticut in 2017

DiPasquale created his Connecticut statue, a 10 foot tall, 25 foot wide depiction of a Native American, for a Washington D.C. liquor store, but installation was blocked by a dispute within the family that owned the store. It was later leased to Best Products, who installed it at their Bethesda, Maryland showroom in 1983, where it remained for eight months. In 1985, the statue was installed in Richmond's The Diamond, home stadium of the Richmond Braves. Following that team's move to Georgia in 2008, the statue was moved to the Lucky Strike building in Shockoe Bottom where it was located until removal in 2019.

Headman, a fiberglass depiction of an African American canal boatman, was installed on Brown's Island in 1988. In May of the following year, the statue went missing; that October, it was found with hundreds of bullet holes. A replacement, cast in bronze, would later be installed.

DiPasquale received permission to design a monument for Richmond-born tennis player Arthur Ashe shortly before Ashe's 1993 death. The Arthur Ashe Monument was installed on Monument Avenue in 1996, to significant controversy.

King Neptune, a depiction of the Roman god, was designed in 2003 for Virginia Beach's Neptune Festival. The statue would be installed on the boardwalk in 2005.
