= William Churchill Noland =

American architect

- Born: 1865; Hanover County, Virginia, U.S.
- Died: August 18, 1951; Richmond, Virginia, U.S.
- Occupation: Architect
- Spouse: Mary Bleecker Miller Noland
- Children: 1 son, 2 daughters

William Churchill Noland (1865 – August 18, 1951) was an American architect. A partner in Noland and Baskervill, he designed the wings of the Virginia State Capitol and several houses on Monument Avenue in Richmond, Virginia.

== Life ==
Noland was born in 1865 in Hanover County, Virginia.

Noland was a fellow of the American Institute of Architects. From 1897 to 1917, he was a partner in Noland and Baskervill, an architectural firm he co-founded with electrical engineer Henry Baskervill, and the two men built houses on Monument Avenue in Richmond, Virginia. They designed the wings of the Virginia State Capitol in 1903. After the firm dissolved, Noland designed buildings and structures in his own right from 1920 to 1940, including churches in Richmond.

Noland married Mary Bleecker Miller; they had a son, Nelson Berkeley Noland, and two daughters. Noland died on August 18, 1951, in Richmond.
