= King Neptune (statue) =

Bronze statue in Virginia

- King Neptune in 2026
- Interactive map of King Neptune
- Location: Boardwalk near Laskin Road, Virginia Beach, Virginia
- Coordinates: 36°51′35″N 75°58′38″W
- Designer: Paul DiPasquale
- Type: Statue
- Material: Bronze
- Height: 34 feet (10 m)
- Completion date: 2005

King Neptune is a large bronze statue located in Virginia Beach, Virginia designed by Paul DiPasquale. It stands at the entrance of Neptune Park on the Virginia Beach Boardwalk at 31st Street, and depicts the mythological god Neptune.

The sculpture weighs 12.5 tons and is 34 feet (10 m) tall. Production of the statue began in 2003 and was completed and dedicated on September 30, 2005.

The design consists of a 12-foot tall rock base surrounded by various fish, two dolphins spanning 17 feet (5.2 m) and 15 feet (4.6 m) respectively, and an 8 feet (2.4 m) octopus climbing the base of the statue. Above this base, the figure of Neptune begins, starting with his waist. Neptune holds a trident in his right hand and rests his left hand on a loggerhead turtle that is 11 feet (3.4 m) in diameter.

== Design and creation ==
In 2003, the Neptune Festival requested submission designs for a statue. Cameron Kitchin, the Director of the Contemporary Arts Center of Virginia Beach (now known as Virginia Museum of Contemporary Art) asked DiPasquale to submit his design of a statue of King Neptune. DiPasquale sent the clay model to the Festival's sculpture committee. After approval and years of planning, the statue was cast in China by Zhang Cong, who used traditional local methods.

Upon arriving in the United States, the three pieces needed interior support before being reassembled. Due to exceeding its budget, the Chinese manufacturers inserted a weak metal to support the statue. This material was cleared out and substituted by a stainless steel skeletal support. According to DiPasquale, replacing the interior and reorganizing the individual pieces together required a month and a half of welding.

The statue was dedicated to the City of Virginia Beach on September 30, 2005, during the Neptune Festival Boardwalk Weekend.

In 2015, the 7 foot maquette that served as a model for the sculpture was donated for display at the Cape Charles boardwalk.

== In popular culture ==
- The King Neptune statue is featured in scenes depicting Pharrell Williams hometown of Virginia Beach in his 2024 biographical documentary Piece by Piece. The prongs on the statue's trident are built using Bionicle pieces.
