= Frederick William Sievers =

American sculptor

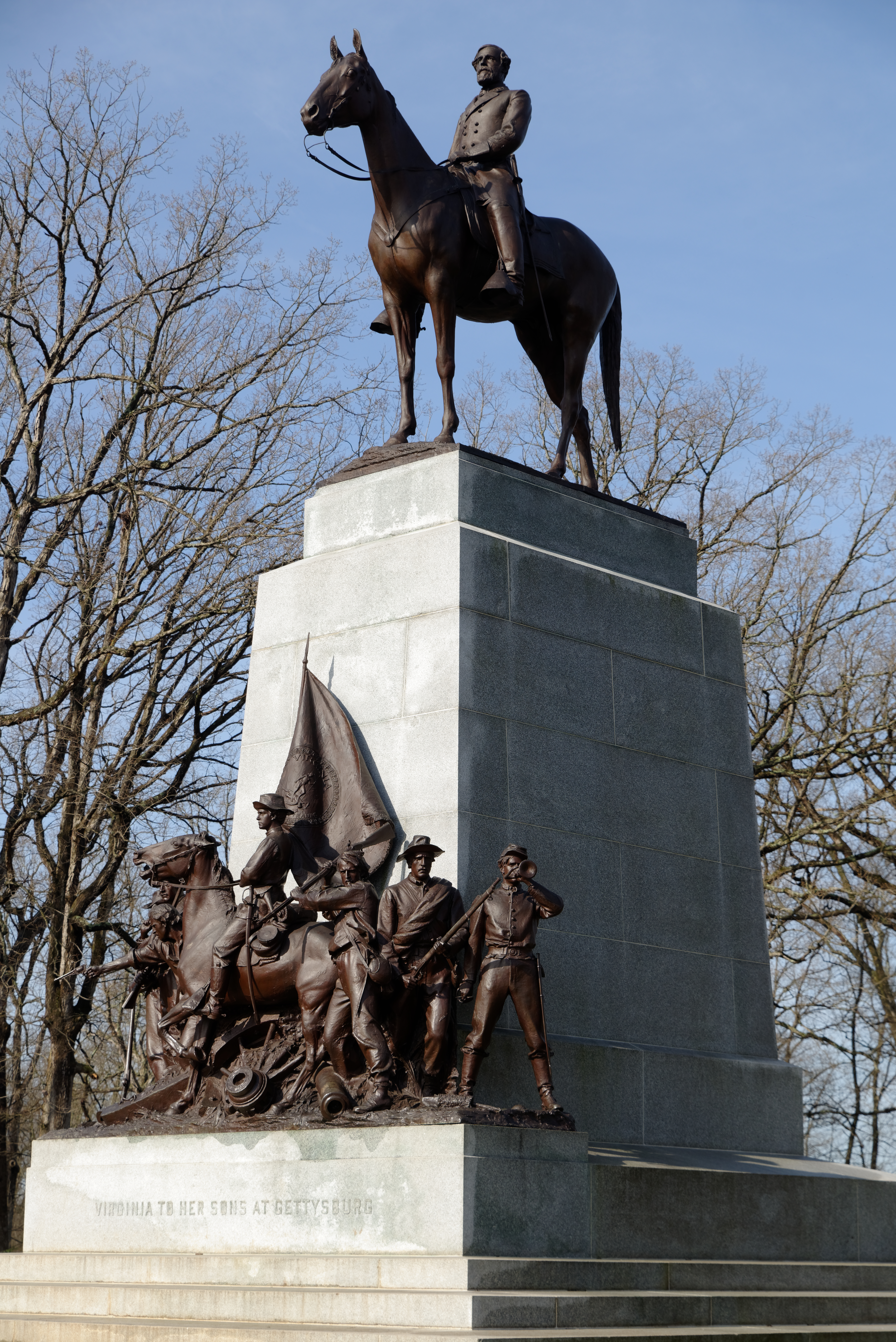
Virginia Memorial, Gettysburg Battlefield, Gettysburg, Pennsylvania.

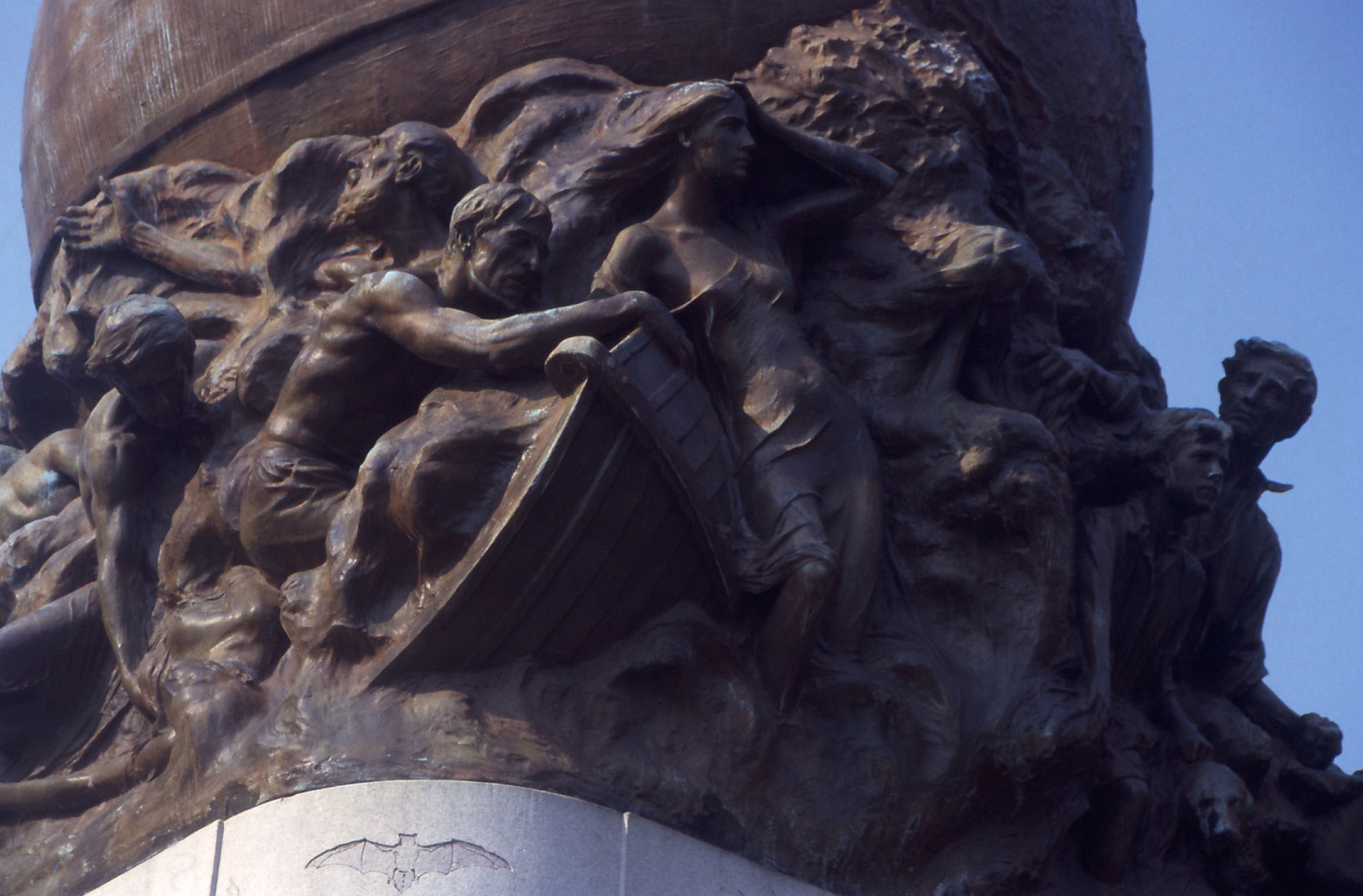
Details atop the Matthew Fontaine Maury Monument, Richmond, Virginia.

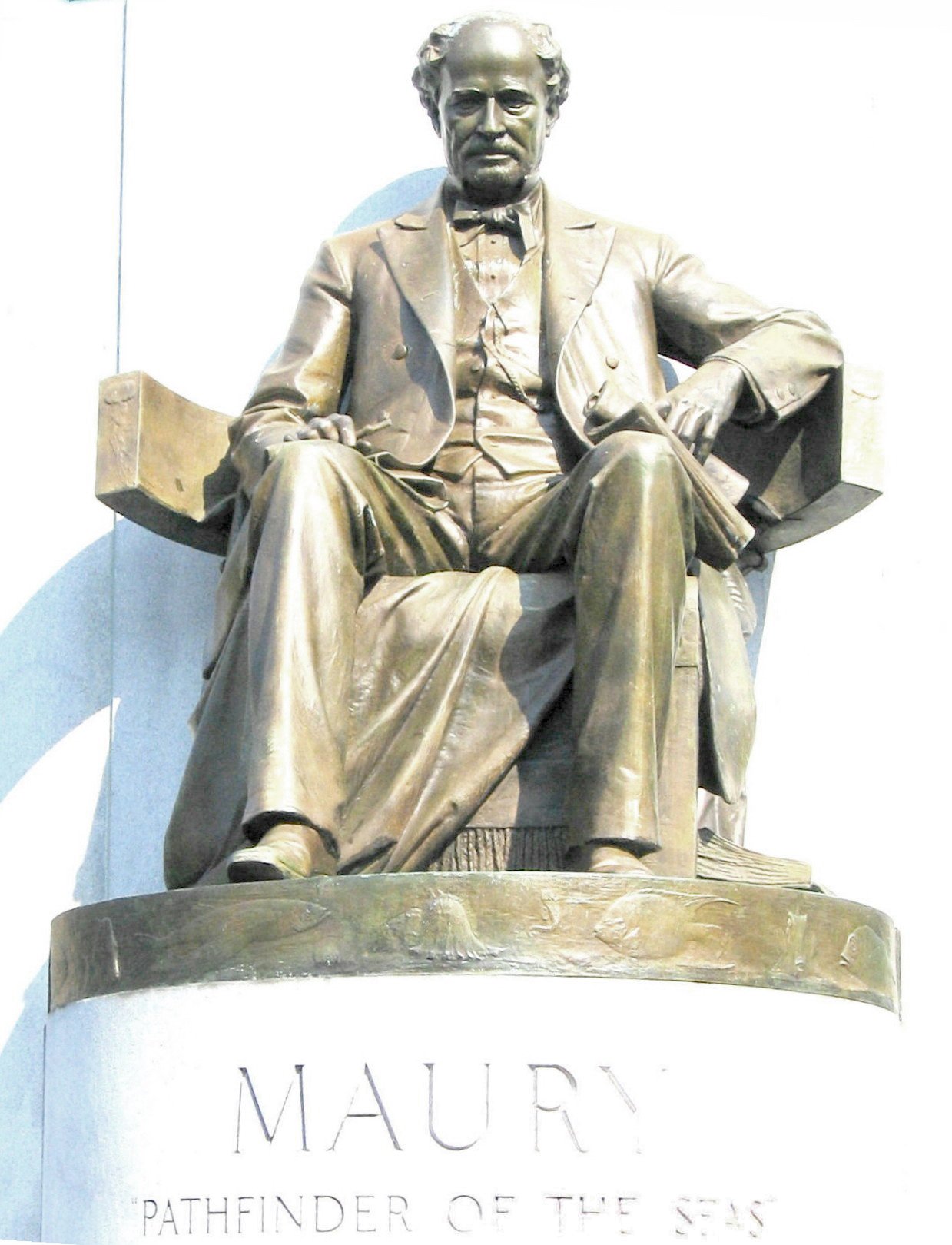
Details of bottom of Maury Pathfinder of the Seas monument.

Frederick William Sievers (October 26, 1872 – 1966) was an American sculptor, born in Fort Wayne, Indiana. Sievers moved to Richmond, Virginia, as a young man, furthering his art studies by attending the Royal Academy of Fine Arts in Rome, where he studied under Ettore Ferrari and the Académie Julian in Paris. In 1910 when Sievers was commissioned to create the Virginia Monument at Gettysburg, Pennsylvania, he opened a studio in Richmond.

Following the success of the Virginia Monument at Gettysburg, Sievers sculpted a number of other statues commemorating the American Civil War, including the Confederate Monument in Woodlawn Cemetery, Elmira, New York, and others in Abingdon, Leesburg, Louisa, and Pulaski County, Virginia.

He further produced monuments to specific Confederate leaders, General Tilghman at Vicksburg, Mississippi and General Stonewall Jackson and Matthew Fontaine Maury, both on Monument Avenue in Richmond. The latter two have been removed.

There are four portrait statues by Sievers in the Virginia Capitol, of United States Presidents James Madison and Zachary Taylor and two others, of Patrick Henry and Sam Houston.

Sievers is buried in Forest Lawn Cemetery (Richmond, Virginia). There, a historical marker commemorating his workshop in the yard of a home on West 43rd Street stands in South Richmond.
