= Matthew Fontaine Maury Monument =

Monument formerly in Richmond, Virginia

Coordinates: 37°33′47″N 77°28′31″W

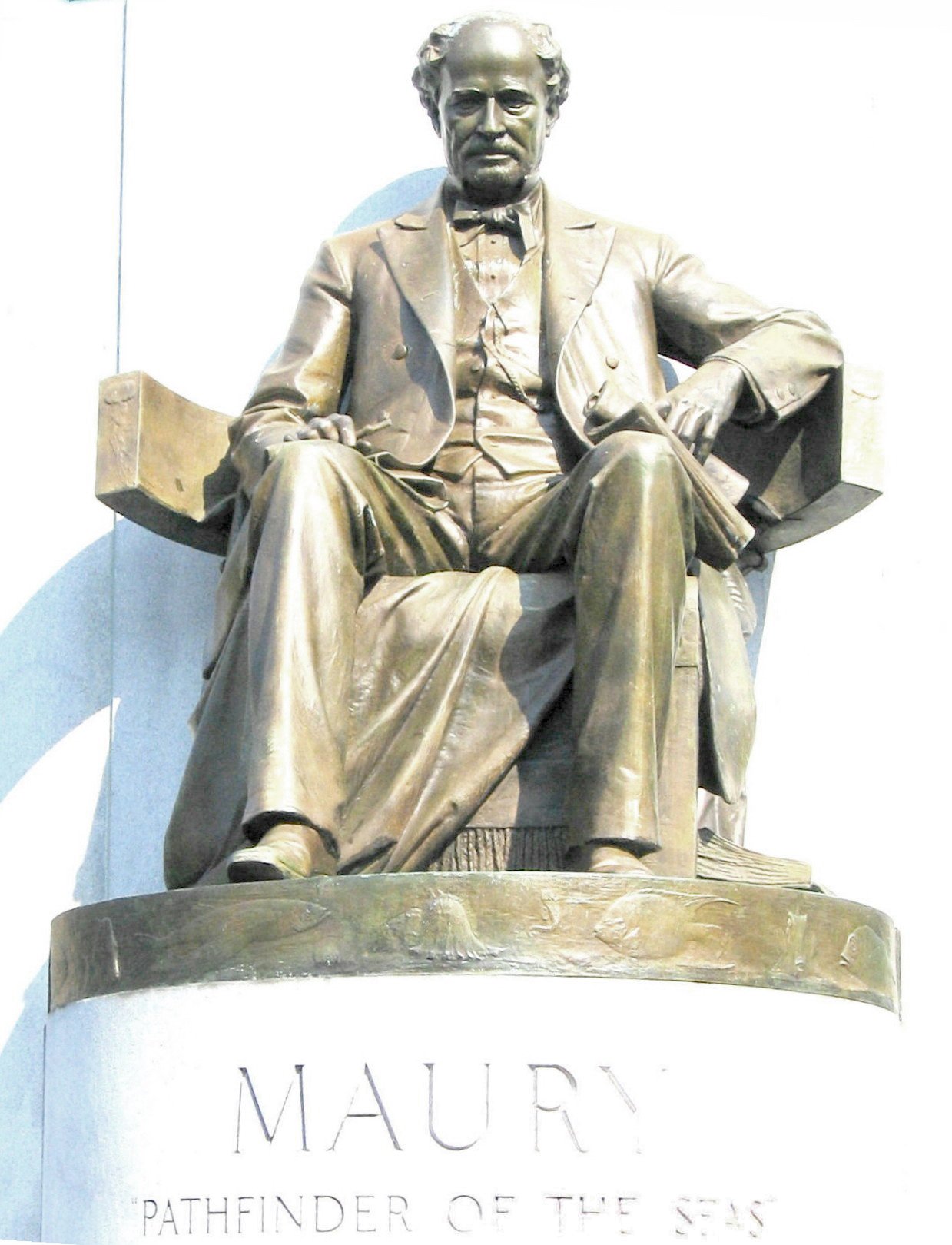
- The statue c. 1983
- Interactive map of Matthew Fontaine Maury Monument
- Location: Richmond, Virginia, U.S.
- Designer: Frederick William Sievers
- Opening date: 1929
- Dedicated to: Matthew Fontaine Maury
- Dismantled date: July 3, 2020

The Matthew Fontaine Maury Monument, was a memorial installed along Richmond, Virginia's Monument Avenue depicting Matthew Fontaine Maury and commemorating his Confederate naval service and contributions to oceanography and naval meteorology. It featured the engraved moniker "Pathfinder of the Seas". In July 2020, the bronze statue of Maury and other sculptural elements were removed from the monument by the city of Richmond, in response to local protests connected to nationwide unrest sparked by the murder of George Floyd in police custody in Minneapolis; the rest of the monument was removed in February 2022.

== Conception and creation ==
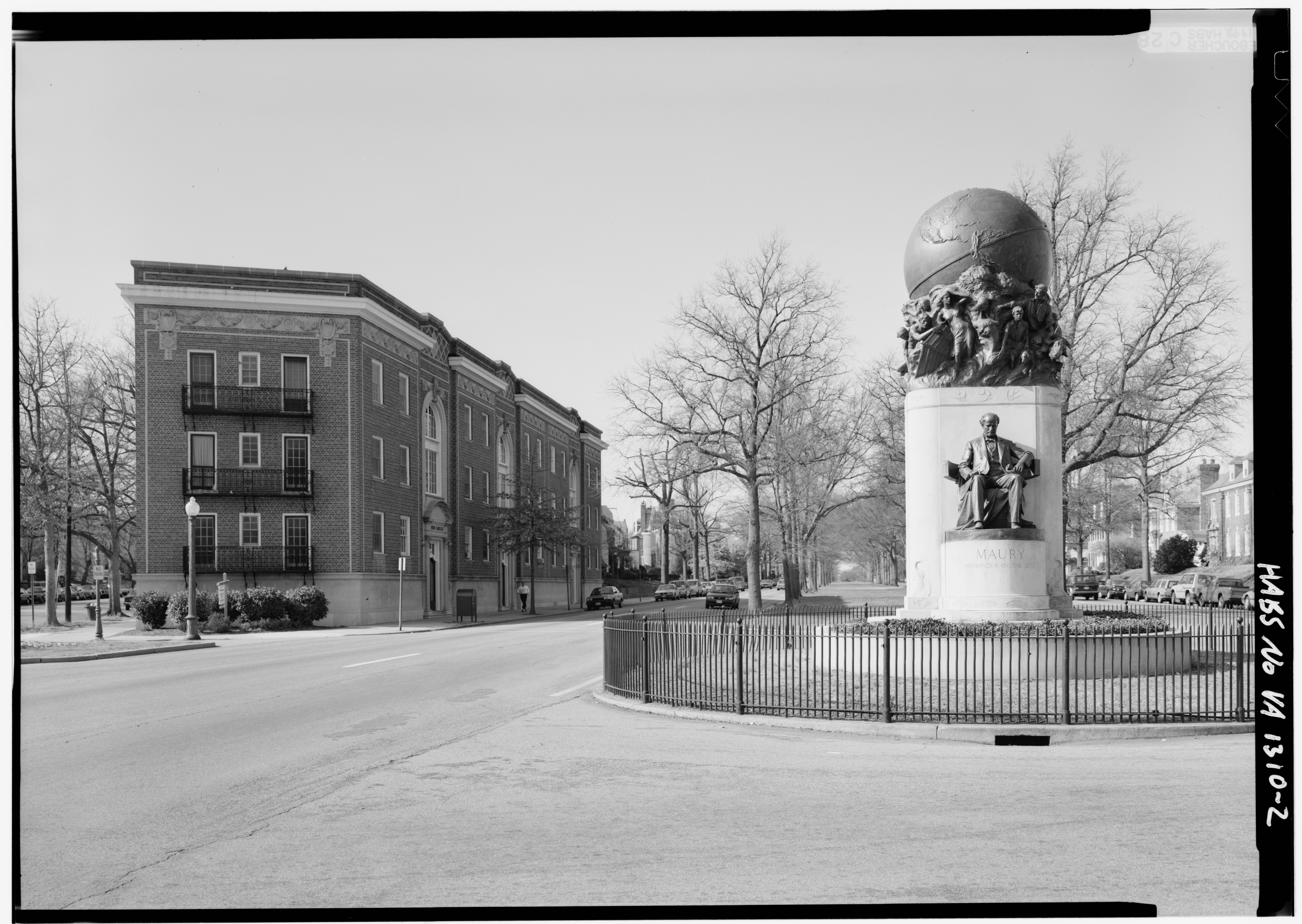
Maury Monument at 3100 block of Monument Ave. in Richmond Virginia

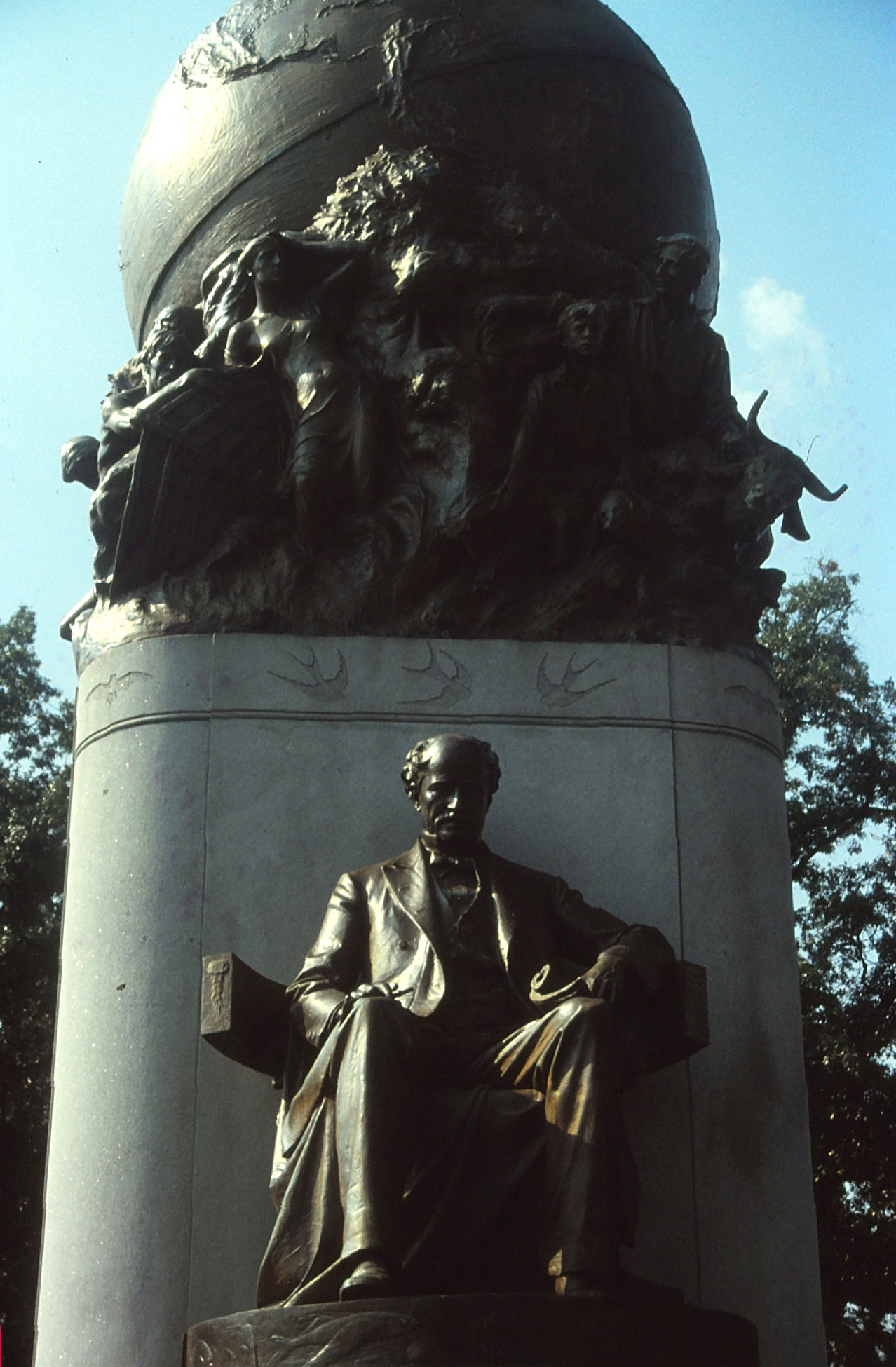
Maury Memorial showing primary and sub-pedestals with globe and seated Maury

The sculpture was designed by Frederick William Sievers and unveiled on November 11, 1929. The "Pathfinder of the Seas" monument of Matthew Fontaine Maury is located on Monument Avenue at Belmont Avenue.

In 1915 the Matthew Fontaine Maury Association was founded with the purpose of erecting a monument to Maury though serious fundraising did not happen until after the end of the First World War. Eventually the United Daughters of the Confederacy joined in the fundraising, the State of Virginia and the City of Richmond each donated $1,000, and even President Wilson, a native Virginian, joined the Association.

The committee selected Richmond sculptor Frederick William Sievers, the author of many Lost Cause memorials, to produce the work and he created the "most allegorical of Richmond's monuments." The monument was unveiled as part of an Armistice Day celebration on November 11, 1929.

The seated figure of Maury faced eastward, toward the Atlantic Ocean that the "Pathfinder of the Seas" charted. He holds in his left hand a pencil and compass and in his right hand a copy of his charts. Beside his left foot is his book, Physical Geography of the Sea, as well as a Bible, indicating the central role that faith played in Maury's life. A globe of the Earth mounted on the upper pedestal is tilted slightly on its axis behind his head. It represents both land and sea, and the woman standing calmly is a representation of Mother Nature between the land and sea. Around the base of the globe are depictions of people clinging to a sinking boat in bad weather representing the dangers of the sea with a woman in the center, and on the right (north) side of the globe there is a farmer, boy and a dog representing Maury's work promoting land weather service, which dates back further than 1853.

== Dismantling ==
On July 3, 2020, during an emergency declaration by Governor of Virginia Ralph Northam due to unrest following police brutality in Minneapolis, parts of the memorial were taken down at the direction of the mayor of Richmond, Levar Stoney. The bronze statue of a chair-seated Maury (representing his handicap) on the lower semi-circular sub-pedestal was quickly removed due to its small size and accessibility; a bronze sculpture higher up on the round main pedestal, featuring a globe sculpture with various figures representing Maury's oceanographic travel and work remained until a week later on July 9 and was removed amid litigation to stop removal of additional memorials temporarily due to concern that the mayor was without authority to remove any of the historic monuments.

While the statue of Maury and the globe were removed, the pedestal and sub-pedestal portions of the monument remained. As of October 2020, the statue's next permanent destination remained unclear. The vacant pedestal and sub-pedestal were finally removed on February 1, 2022, and the site has been made into a garden.

== See also ==
- 1929 in art
- Removal of Confederate monuments and memorials
