= Robert E. Lee Monument (Richmond, Virginia) =

Former public sculpture

- U.S. National Register of Historic Places
- U.S. National Historic Landmark District – Contributing property
- Virginia Landmarks Register
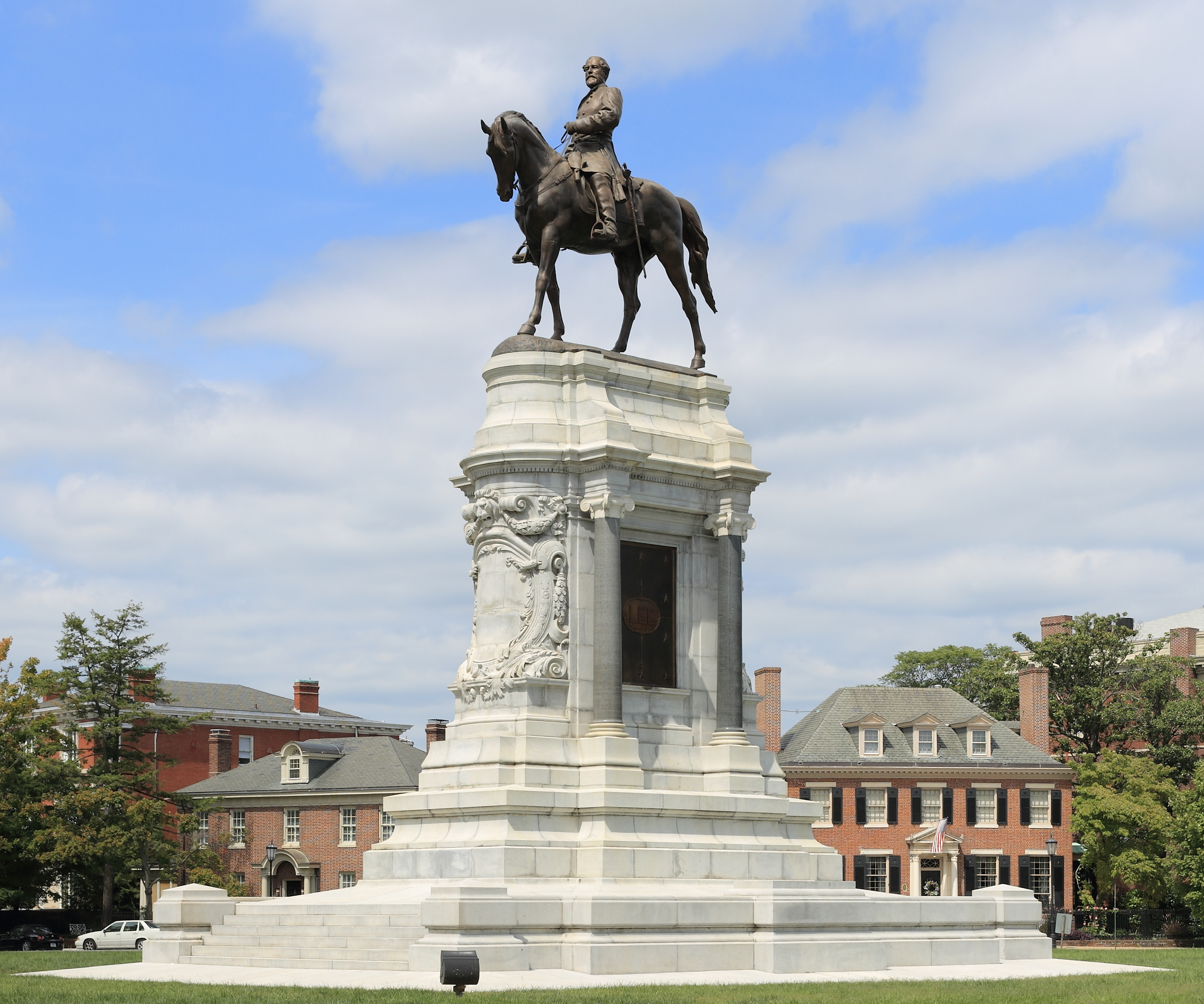
- The monument in 2013

- Location within Virginia Location within the United States
- Location: 1700 Monument Ave., jct. of Monument and Allen Aves., Richmond, Virginia
- Coordinates: 37.55384°N 77.46012°W
- Area: less than one acre
- Built: 1890
- Architect: Paul Pujol (pedestal)
- Sculptor: Marius Jean Antonin Mercié
- Demolished: September 8, 2021 (removal of statue), February 2022 (dismantling of pedestal)
- Part of: Monument Avenue Historic District (ID70000883)
- NRHP reference No.: 06001213
- VLR No.: 127-0181

Significant dates
- Added to NRHP: January 5, 2007
- Designated NHLDCP: December 9, 1997
- Designated VLR: September 6, 2006

The Robert E. Lee Monument in Richmond, Virginia, was the first installation on Monument Avenue in 1890, and would ultimately be the last Confederate monument removed from the site. Before its removal on September 8, 2021, the monument honored Confederate General Robert E. Lee, depicted on a horseback atop a large marble base that stood over 60 feet (18 m) tall. Constructed in France and shipped to Virginia, it remained the largest installation on Monument Avenue for over a century; it was first listed on the National Register of Historic Places in 2007 and the Virginia Landmarks Register in 2006.

After the murder of George Floyd in 2020, the controversial monument was vandalized in graffiti, and many activists had called for its removal. Ralph Northam, the Governor of Virginia, ordered for the statue to be removed on June 4, 2020, but was blocked by a state court pending the outcome of a lawsuit. The state court ultimately ruled in Northam's favor in October 2020, but the decision was again put on hold pending appeal. The Supreme Court of Virginia heard oral arguments in June 2021, ruling on September 2 that the restrictive covenants from 1887 and 1890 were no longer enforceable, and the monument could be removed by the state; the bronze sculpture was removed from its plinth six days later. The vacant plinth was dismantled in February 2022, and now no trace of the monument remains on its original site.

== Description and location ==
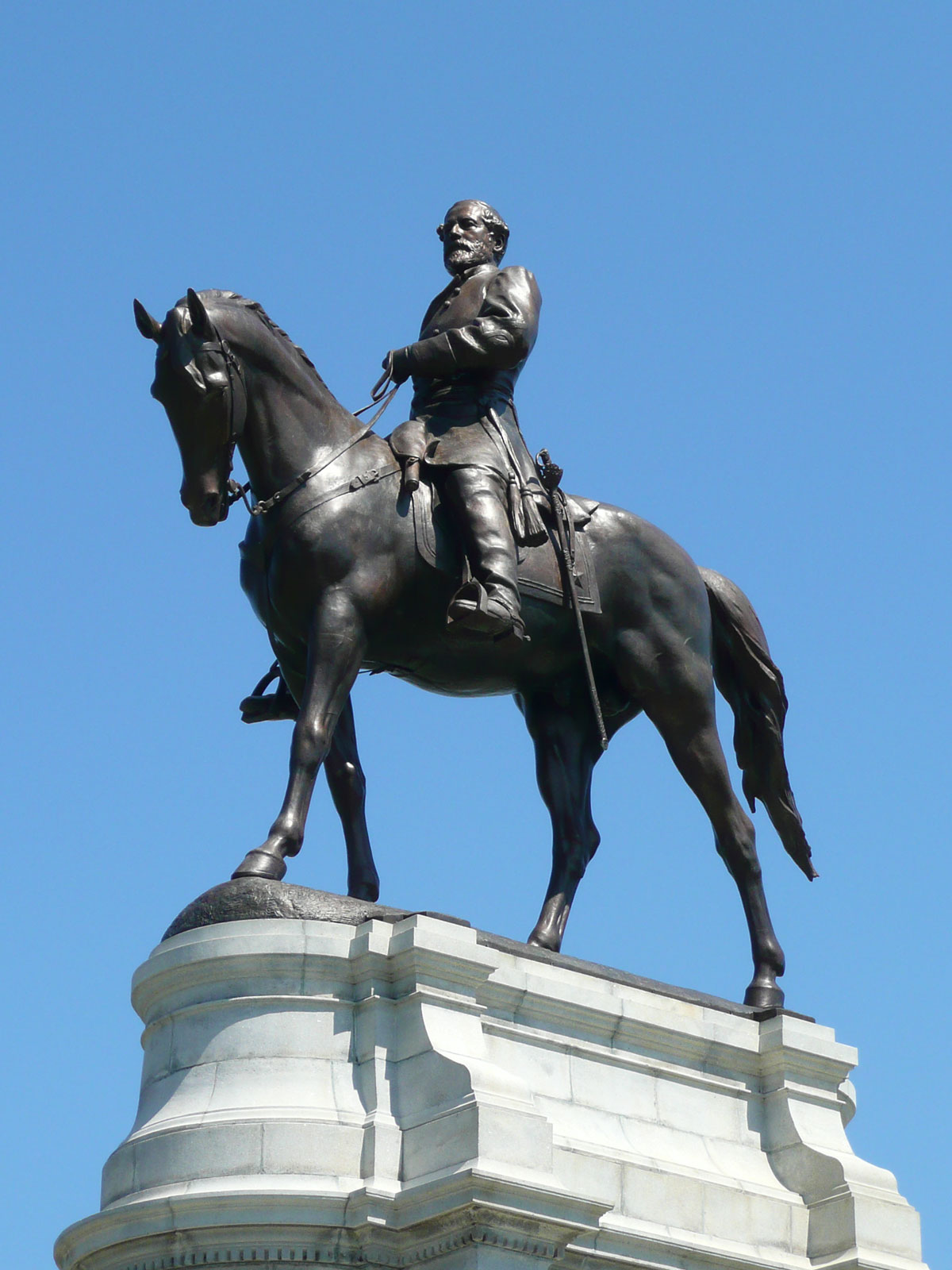
The equestrian statue

The bronze statue, sculpted by Antonin Mercié, depicted Confederate general Robert E. Lee atop a horse. A friend of Augustus Saint-Gaudens, who likely helped him secure the commission, Mercié was chosen due to his international stature. The horse was not a representation of Robert E. Lee's horse Traveller, whose modest scale Mercié believed would not suit the overall composition. Traveller was replaced by a stronger looking thoroughbred. Lee stood 14 feet (4.3 m) high atop his horse and the entire statue was 60 feet (18 m) tall including a stone base designed by Paul Pujol. A time capsule was embedded in the base pedestal when the monument was first erected.

The state-controlled land around the statue's former site serves as a traffic circle at the intersection of Monument Avenue and Allen Avenue (named after Otway Allen, the developer who donated the land to the association). The Lee Monument was a focal point for Richmond. (Most popular online maps depict the "Lee Circle" as the center of Richmond). It was originally the front gate of the Virginia Base Ball Park, where the Richmond Virginians used to play.

== History ==
=== Background ===
Throughout the war, Southerners generally viewed Lee as a war hero and a master strategist. Following the death of Robert E. Lee in 1870, several organizations were formed with the goal of erecting a monument to Lee in Richmond. These included survivors of Lee's Army of Northern Virginia, the Lee Monument Association led by Confederate General Jubal Early, and the Ladies' Lee Monument Association. These organizations were merged into the Lee Monument Commission in 1886, led by Lee's nephew and Virginia governor Fitzhugh Lee and together the funds combined to $52,000.

=== Construction and dedication ===
When the construction of the monument was complete, the Lee Monument Association of Virginia sent a representative to France to inspect the work and issue the final payment of $20,000. The journalist Lida McCabe reported on the transaction between the American businessman and the French sculptor, observing that the transaction was forced and uneasy. The Monument Association representative seemed to have little interest in the monument itself and simply occupied himself with his financial duties. McCabe's reporting focused on the dedication that Mercié put into the sculpture. After listening to Mercié, McCabe discovered that he had researched the Civil War and General Lee extensively. McCabe reported that Mercié had acquired different props such as saddles and stirrups, coats, and boots to make sure that the monument was as accurate as possible.

In early October 1887, preparations for the laying of the cornerstone were underway. "Gen. George W. Morgan, of Ohio, a gallant Union soldier, responding to an invitation to attend the laying of the corner stone of the Lee monument at Richmond, says: 'We of the North and West highly appreciate the grand simplicity, strength and loftiness of Robert E. Lee's character. As a public enemy we respected him, while we fought against his cause and for the preservation of the Union. As a gentleman we admired him for his integrity, and placed a high estimate on the wisdom of his course after the restoration of peace'." Newspapers throughout the U.S. printed similar items.

The cornerstone for the monument was placed on October 27, 1887. The statue arrived in Richmond by rail on May 4, 1890. Newspaper accounts indicate that 10,000 people helped pull four wagons with the pieces of the monument. The completed statue was unveiled on May 29, 1890. Two of Lee's daughters, Mary Custis Lee and Mildred Childe Lee, attended the dedication. One group of U.S. army veterans in Illinois passed a resolution entitled "treason must be made odious" that protested "the display of rebel flags at the Lee monument dedication to the exclusion of the flag of our country."

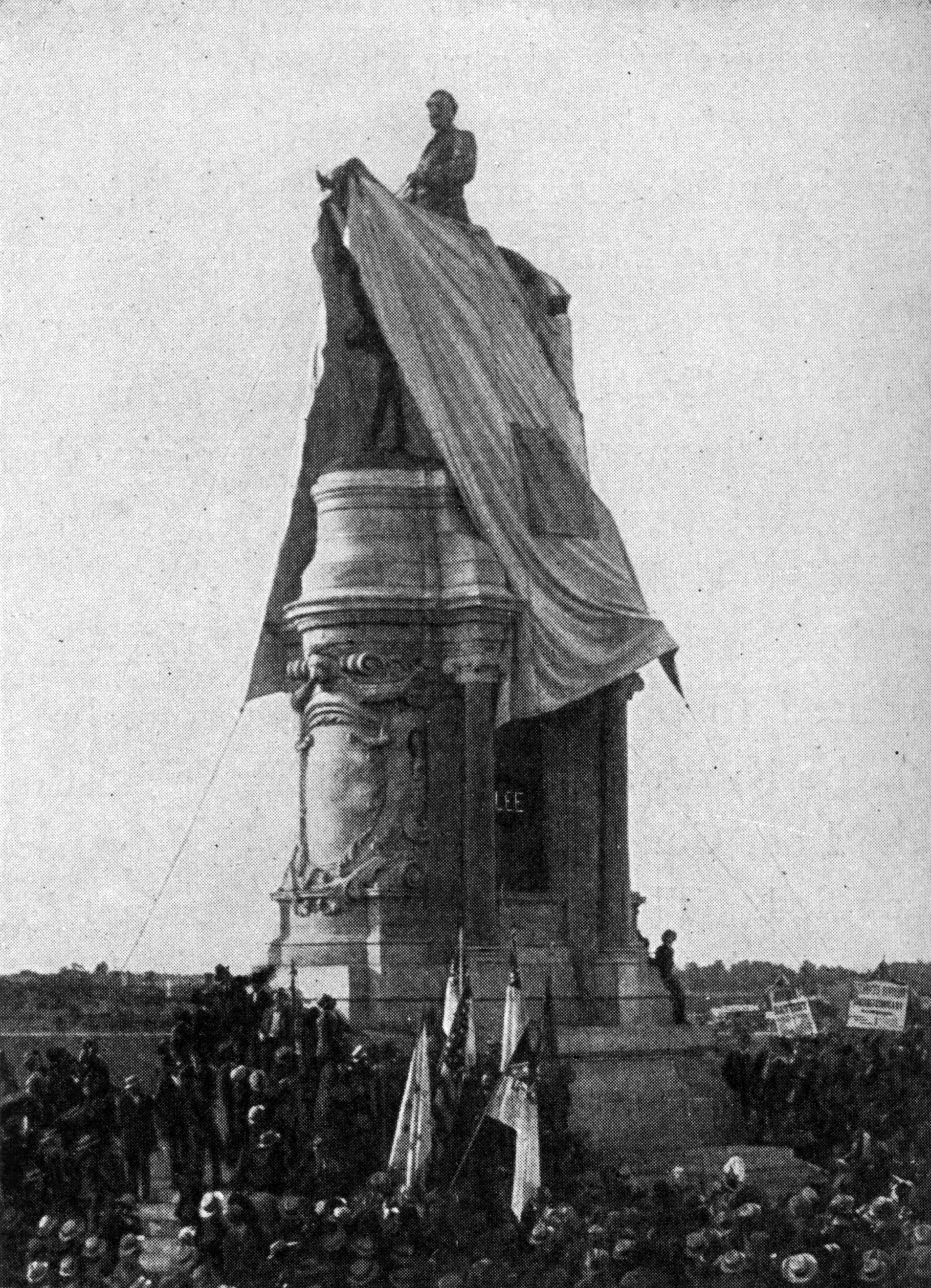
Unveiling of the monument, 1890

The site for the statue originally was offered in 1886. Richmond City annexed the land in 1892, but economic difficulties meant that the Lee Monument stood alone for several years in the middle of a tobacco field before development resumed in the early 1900s.

In 1992, the iron fence around the monument was removed, in part because drivers unfamiliar with traffic circles would run into the fence from time to time and force costly repairs. After the fences came down, the stone base became a popular sunbathing spot. In December 2006, the state completed an extensive cleaning and repair of the monument.

It was listed on the National Register of Historic Places in 2007, the Virginia Landmarks Register since 2006, and was located in the Monument Avenue Historic District.

=== Time capsule ===
During the construction of the Lee Monument, a time capsule from 1887 was reportedly placed in or under one of the cornerstones of the monument base. The original time capsule was said to have roughly 60 items from 30 families and businesses. A state-supervised search for the time capsule at the base of the plinth proved fruitless and was discontinued on September 9, 2021. Three months later, however, on December 17, crews dismantling the plinth's tower extracted a building block that appeared to contain the time capsule in question. The lead box recovered from the block instead contained mementos from members of the monument's planning commission that dated no earlier than 1889, after the original time capsule had been assembled. A copper box containing a second time capsule was found on December 28 underneath the monument's northeastern cornerstone, as expected. Lists of the contents of these capsules have been published by the Virginia Department of Historic Resources (DHR) and are available on its website (see external links).

On June 22, 2021, Governor Ralph Northam announced plans to replace the 1887 time capsule located at the Lee Monument site. Individuals could submit items to be placed in the new time capsule that they either owned or could obtain. On September 7, Governor Northam announced that the new artifacts would be placed in a new time capsule. Among the 39 items included were artifacts from the COVID-19 vaccination campaign, a personalized cloth face mask donated by Virginia First Lady Pamela Northam, items from the Mattaponi and Pamunkey nations, a fragment of tarp that covered the Rumors of War statue at its unveiling and a railroad spike found near the Shockoe Bottom African Burial Ground in Richmond. The time capsule will likely be buried near the site of the former memorial.

=== Controversy ===
Historians and activists have offered a range of opinions on the monument; some have pointed out its problematic perpetuation of what had been identified as The Lost Cause of the Confederacy. In August 2017, after the violence that occurred at the 2017 Unite the Right rally, protestors called for the removal of the Lee statues in Charlottesville and Richmond.

=== Vandalism and calls for removal ===
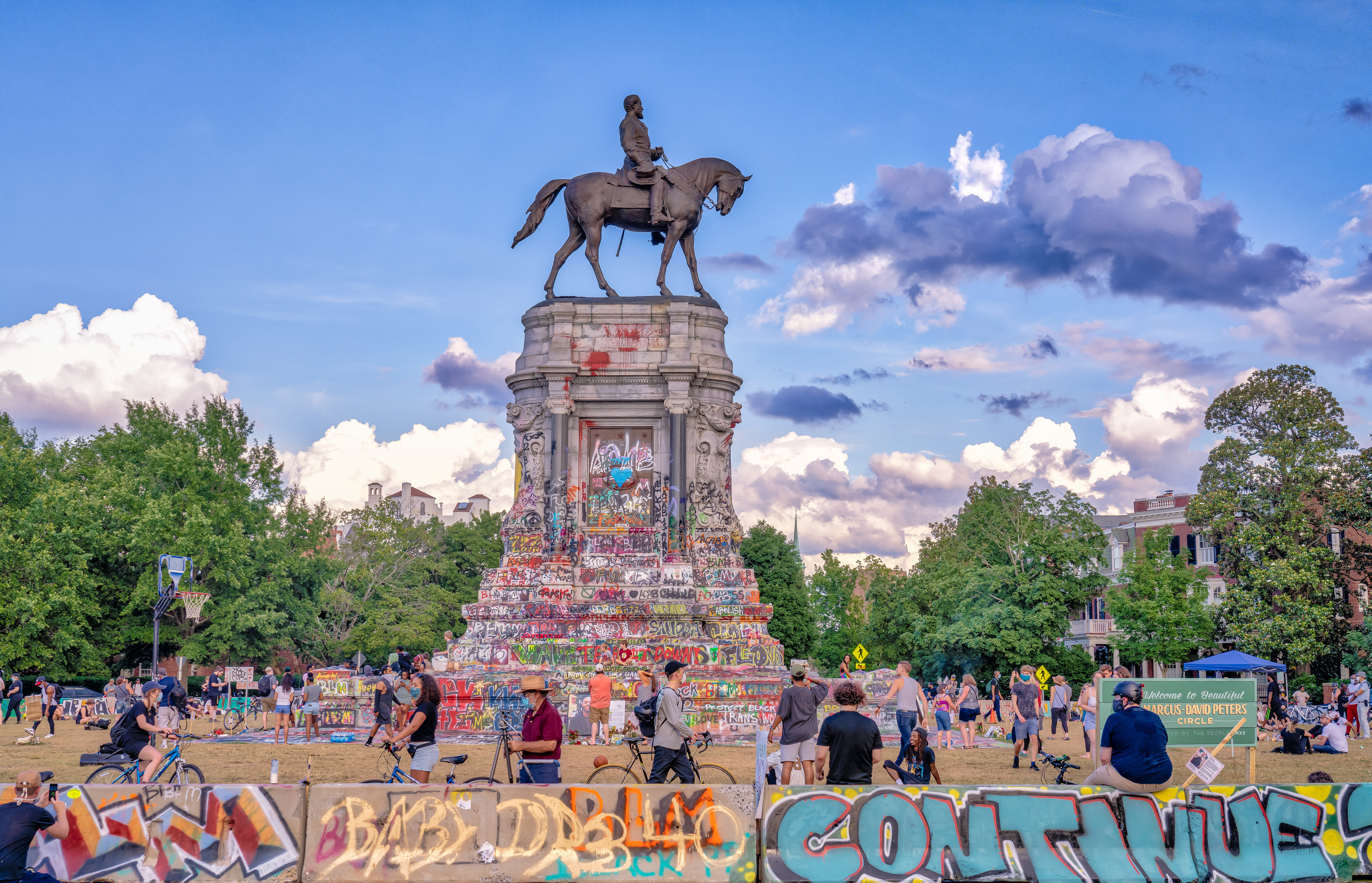
Vandalism of the monument, June 2020

On June 4, 2020, Virginia governor Ralph Northam announced that the Richmond statue would be removed in response to the protests that followed the murder of George Floyd. On June 8, a judge in Richmond Circuit Court issued a temporary injunction against the monument's removal, citing a lawsuit filed by William C. Gregory, who claims the Commonwealth promised to "faithfully guard" and "affectionately protect" the statue in the deed that originally annexed the property to the state. Subsequent legal proceedings led to a hearing on July 23, which concluded without a ruling on the monument's future. A new 90-day injunction against the monument's removal began August 3. After nearby residents filed a lawsuit to keep the statue in its place, Virginia's Attorney General filed a motion to dismiss the suit; circuit court Judge W. Reilly Marchant ruled August 25, 2020 that the matter would proceed to trial. The October 19 trial resulted in a halted decision pending appeal.

On September 2, 2021, the Supreme Court of Virginia ruled unanimously in the two separate cases affirming the power of Governor Ralph Northam to order the statue removed from state-owned property.

=== Protest actions ===
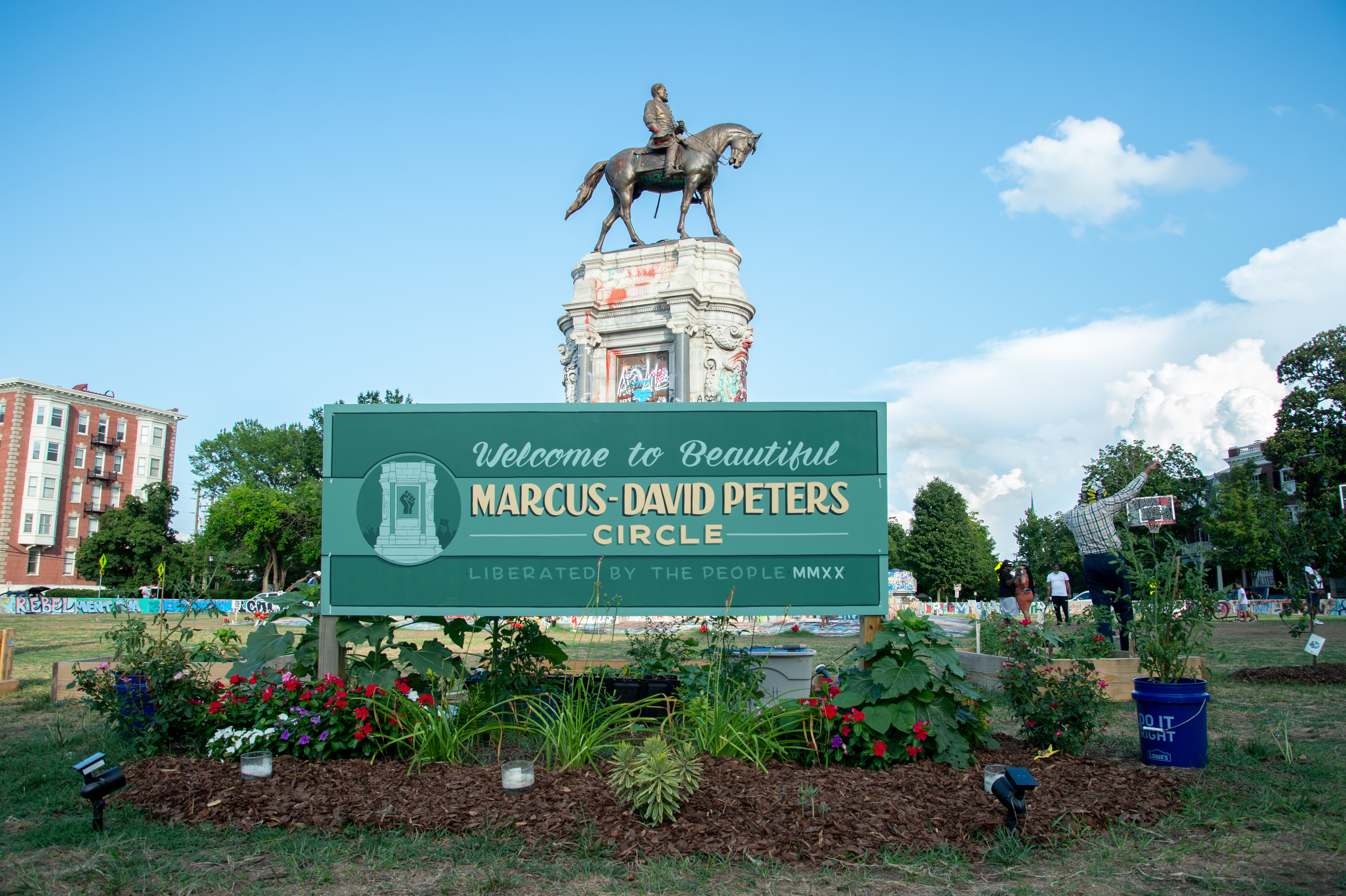
Marcus-David Peters Circle, August 2020

Following Black Lives Matter protests in June 2020, the traffic circle where the statue stood was unofficially updated with a sign that reads "Welcome to Beautiful Marcus-David Peters Circle, Liberated by the People MMXX": memorializing Marcus-David Peters, a Black man from Richmond who was shot and killed by the police in 2018, while naked and unarmed, after threatening to kill the officer. The area contained signs that told the story of Peters and milestones he missed since his death. The location is often used as a protest site to remember all who have died from police brutality.

In the wake of protests, the graffiti-covered monument increasingly became a venue to portray images of racial justice and empowerment: from ballerinas dancing at the base of the plinth to video projections of George Floyd, Malcolm X, Angela Davis (and others) onto the statue itself. In October 2020 the graffiti-covered monument was deemed among the most influential American protest artworks since World War II according to the New York Times.

It has all since been removed.

=== Removal ===
Following the ruling of the State Supreme Court, the Commonwealth of Virginia approved the removal and the statue was taken down on September 8, 2021, then sent to storage.

Governor Ralph Northam issued a statement on the removal of the Lee Monument immediately following the removal:

"After 133 years, the statue of Robert E. Lee has finally come down—the last Confederate statue on Monument Avenue, and the largest in the South. The public monuments reflect the story we choose to tell about who we are as a people. It is time to display history as history, and use the public memorials to honor the full and inclusive truth of who we are today and in the future."

The Emancipation and Freedom Monument was installed on September 22, 2021 at Brown's Island.

The transfer of the Lee statue and other monuments to the Black History Museum and Cultural Center of Virginia, was announced December 30, 2021 and given unanimous approval by the Richmond City Council the next month.

The vacant pedestal was dismantled in February 2022, and the traffic circle is now a bare patch of grass.

== See also ==
- 1890 in art
- Virginia Regiment
- List of Confederate monuments and memorials
- List of monuments and memorials removed during the George Floyd protests
