= Monument Avenue =

- Monument Avenue Historic District
- U.S. National Register of Historic Places
- U.S. National Historic Landmark District
- Virginia Landmarks Register
- Richmond City Historic District
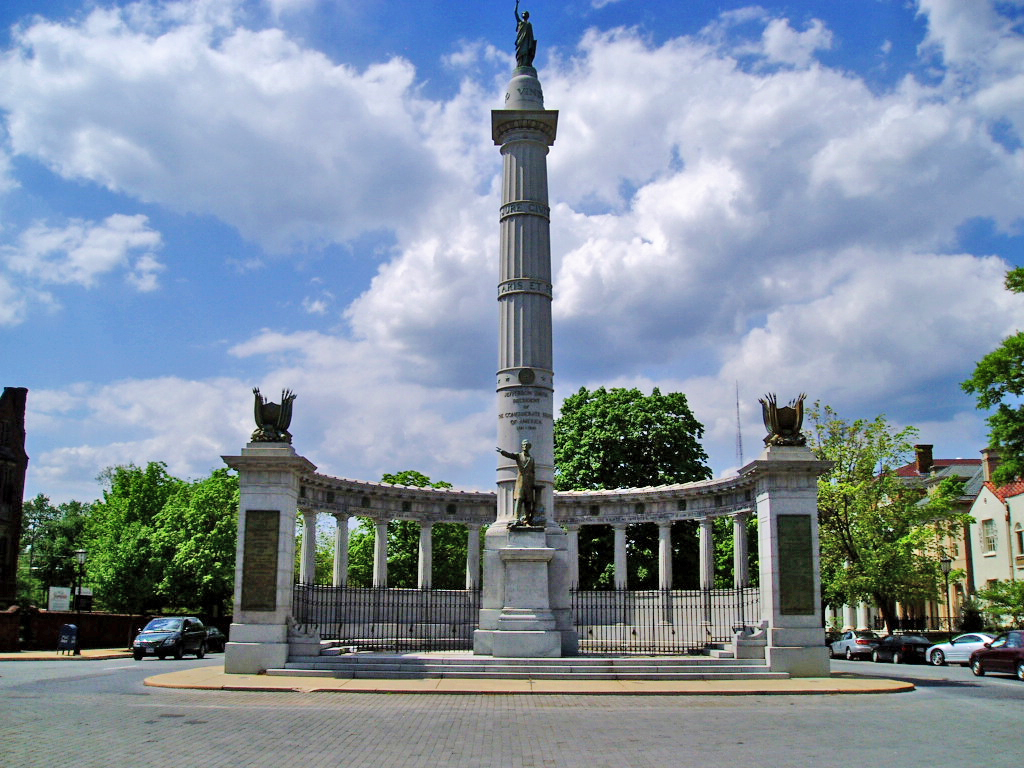
- Former location of Jefferson Davis Memorial on Monument Avenue, Richmond, Virginia

- Location within Virginia Location within the United States
- Location: Bounded by Grace and Birch sts., Park Ave., and Roseneath Rd.; roughly, Franklin St. from Roseneath Rd. to Cleveland St., Richmond, Virginia
- Coordinates: 37°33′30″N 77°28′04″W
- Architect: John Russell Pope
- Architectural style: Georgian, Gothic Revival
- NRHP reference No.: 70000883
- VLR No.: 127-0174

Significant dates
- Added to NRHP: February 16, 1970
- Designated NHLD: December 9, 1997
- Designated VLR: December 2, 1969, December 12, 1989

Monument Avenue is a tree-lined grassy mall dividing the eastbound and westbound traffic in Richmond, Virginia, originally named for its emblematic complex of structures honoring those who fought during the American Civil War for the Confederacy, which had its capital in the city. Between 1900 and 1925, Monument Avenue greatly expanded with architecturally significant houses, churches, and apartment buildings. Four of the bronze statues representing J. E. B. Stuart, Stonewall Jackson, Jefferson Davis and Matthew Fontaine Maury were removed from their memorial pedestals amidst civil unrest in July 2020. The Robert E. Lee Monument, dedicated in 1890, was removed on September 8, 2021. All these monuments, including their pedestals, have now been removed completely from the Avenue. The last remaining statue on Monument Avenue is the Arthur Ashe Monument, memorializing the African-American tennis champion, dedicated in 1996.

In the wake of the protests that followed the murder of George Floyd in 2020, the Davis monument was torn down by protestors, while the Lee monument, owned by the Commonwealth, was ordered to be removed by Governor Ralph Northam. In July 2020, Richmond mayor Levar Stoney directed removal of the remaining Confederate monuments on city-owned land including J.E.B. Stuart, Stonewall Jackson, Matthew Fontaine Maury, the cannons marking the Richmond Defenses, and other monuments around the Richmond area. Public opinion regarding the removal or retention of the statues was close to evenly split in several polls, with varying support for retaining the statues with historical context or moving them elsewhere.

Monument Avenue is the site of several annual events, particularly in the spring, including an annual Monument Avenue 10K race and "Easter on Parade", when many Richmonders stroll the avenue wearing Easter bonnets and other finery. Prior to 2020, at various times (such as Robert E. Lee's birthday and Confederate History Month), the Sons of Confederate Veterans gathered along Monument Avenue in period military costumes.

"Monument Avenue Historic District" includes the part of Monument Avenue beginning at the traffic circle in the east at the intersection of West Franklin Street and North Lombardy Street, extending westward for some fourteen blocks to Roseneath Avenue, and is listed on the National Register of Historic Places as a National Historic Landmark District.

The American Planning Association selected Monument Avenue as one of the "10 Great Streets in America for 2007" based upon the corridor's historical residential design and craftsmanship, diversity of land uses, the integration of multiple forms of transportation, and the commitment of the community to preserve its legacy.

== History ==
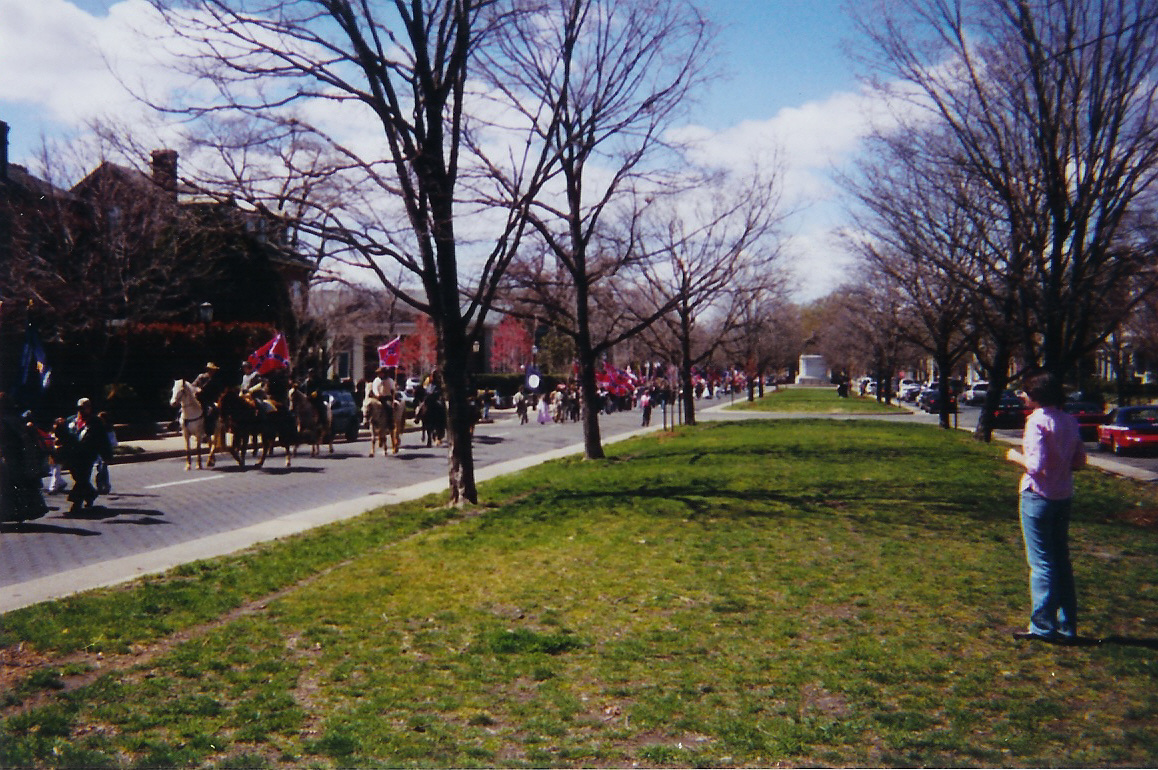
Confederate Parade on Monument Ave., in the early 2000s

The former capital of the Confederacy, Richmond became a central location of the Lost Cause of the Confederacy mythos. The Southern economy was largely devastated due to the war; former Confederates therefore held onto their pride and demanded respect. Monument Avenue was conceived during a site search for a memorial statue of General Robert E. Lee after Lee's death in 1870. Richmond citizens had been wanting to erect statues for three Virginians who had helped defend the city (two of whom were killed in the defense). City plans as early as 1887 show the proposed site, a circle of land, just past the end of West Franklin Street, a premier uptown residential avenue at the time. The land was owned by a wealthy Richmonder, Otway C. Allen. The plan for the statue included building a grand avenue extending west lined with trees along a central grassy median, in accordance with the “City Beautiful” style of urban planning and civic design during this time. The plan shows building plots which Allen intended to sell to developers and those wishing to build houses on the new grand avenue.

On May 29, 1890, crowds were estimated at 100,000 to view the unveiling of the first monument, a massive memorial to Robert E. Lee.

It would take about 10 years for wealthy Richmonders and speculative developers to start buying the lots and building houses along the avenue, but in the years between 1900 and 1925 Monument Avenue exploded with architecturally significant houses, churches and apartment buildings. The architects who built on Monument Avenue practiced in the region and nationally, and included the firms of John Russell Pope, William Bottomley, Duncan Lee, Marcellus Wright, Claude Howell, Henry Baskervill, D. Wiley Anderson, Albert Huntt, and Walter Dabney Blair. Speculative builders such as W. J. Payne, Harvey C. Brown and the Davis Brothers bought lots and built many houses to sell to those not designing with an architect.

The street was once a favored residential area for Richmond's upper class. The Fan District section, in particular, is lined with large mansions from the end of the Gilded Age. The Museum District part of Monument Avenue includes a combination of large houses (especially in the 3100 block), apartment buildings, and smaller single-family houses. West of Interstate 195, Monument Avenue becomes a more typically suburban avenue, although it continues the wide lanes and expansive grassy median with a variety of trees through to its termination a little over two miles past the current city limits in Henrico County.

Through the decades, the avenue has had its ups and downs. As early as 1910, but mostly during the 1950s and '60s, many of the large homes were subdivided into apartments, or interior rooms and carriage houses were let to boarders as Richmond's upper class largely abandoned Monument Avenue for newer suburban neighborhoods in the West End many of which are outside the city limits in predominantly white Henrico County. A few houses were demolished to make way for parking lots or building expansions, and several modern additions were tucked between earlier existing buildings. But protections put in place by the city by designating Monument Avenue as an Old and Historic Neighborhood have helped maintain the integrity of the neighborhood. In 1969, a group was incorporated called The Residents and Associates for the Preservation of Monument Avenue, led by Zayde Rennolds Dotts (Mrs. Walter Dotts, Jr.), granddaughter of Beulah and John Kerr Branch, a banker who had commissioned a Jacobean mansion on Monument Avenue in 1914 by the firm of John Russell Pope. In 1970 the group changed its name to the Monument Avenue Preservation Society (MAPS).

Monument Avenue is designated as State Route 418, though not signed as such publicly.

From 1981 to 1988, just over 1 mile (1.6 km) of Monument Avenue between Malvern Avenue (VA 197) and Arthur Ashe Boulevard (VA 161) was officially designated as unsigned State Route 418.

In August 2017, following the Unite the Right rally and a vehicle attack in Charlottesville, Virginia, Richmond Mayor Levar Stoney announced that the city's Monument Avenue commission would look at providing contextual markers around the Confederate monuments as an option for dealing with the issues raised by statues honoring men who fought to preserve slavery and fracture the Union. At that time, removal of such statues was not permitted at the local level under Virginia law. In April 2020, the Democratic Party took over the Virginia legislature and changed the law, allowing local jurisdictions to remove monuments other than in cemeteries and the Virginia Military Institute; the changes were to take effect in July 2020. On June 10, 2020, protestors tore down the statue of Jefferson Davis from its pedestal. Because the new law permitting local removal was not yet in effect, a law firm developed a legal strategy that enabled Mayor Stoney to invoke the Mayor's emergency powers to successfully remove Confederate monuments from municipal property. On the first day the new law was in effect, July 1, 2020, Mayor Stoney had a State of Emergency extended to justify the removal of the statue of Stonewall Jackson by a City of Richmond contract, followed with the removal of the Maury statue and the defensive cannon display on July 2. Mayor Stoney then announced plans to remove a total of 11 Confederate memorials. There was an investigation into the awarding of the contract for removal by Stoney as political patronage, but Augusta County Commonwealth Attorney Tim Martin found because of the circumstances (where most contractors rejected bidding on the removal due to the perception of possible threats against their business for doing so), that the contracted contractor created a new company to carry out the work specifically to avoid those threats, and that the bid price was justified for the circumstances, nor was it connected to the mayor's campaign at all, clearing Stoney and the contractor of any wrongdoing.

== Monuments ==
External videos
- Monument Avenue (5:34), C-SPAN

Monument Avenue is home to the Arthur Ashe Monument, a memorial to Richmond native Arthur Ashe. Sculpted by Paul DiPasquale, it was unveiled on July 10, 1996.

The Avenue previously included several statues dedicated to Confederate military and political figures, including:

Monument	Sculptor	Unveiled	Removed
Robert E. Lee Monument	Antonin Mercié	May 29, 1890	September 8, 2021
J. E. B. Stuart Monument	Frederick Moynihan	May 30, 1907	July 7, 2020
Jefferson Davis Memorial	Edward Valentine	June 3, 1907	June 10, 2020
Stonewall Jackson Monument	Frederick William Sievers	October 11, 1919	July 1, 2020
Matthew Fontaine Maury Monument	Frederick William Sievers	November 11, 1929	July 2, 2020

=== Robert E. Lee Monument ===
The Robert E. Lee Monument was located in the traffic circle at the intersection of Monument Avenue and Allen Street. Dedicated in 1890, the Lee Monument was the first and the largest of the street's monuments. It was removed on September 8, 2021 by the Commonwealth of Virginia following a state Supreme Court ruling. At the time it was removed, the Lee statue was the last existing Confederate monument on Monument Avenue.

=== J.E.B. Stuart Monument ===
The J. E. B. Stuart Monument was located in the traffic circle at the intersection of West Franklin Street and North Lombardy Street. The statue of Stuart was removed by the City of Richmond on July 7, 2020. The empty pedestal stood until February 2022, when it too was removed, and the traffic circle has been made into a garden.

=== Jefferson Davis Memorial ===
The Jefferson Davis Memorial was located at the intersection of Monument Avenue and North Davis Street. The statue was toppled on June 10, 2020, during the protests following the murder of George Floyd.

=== Stonewall Jackson Monument ===
The equestrian statue of Stonewall Jackson was located at the intersection of Monument Avenue and North Boulevard.

Mayor Stoney had the monument removed on July 1, 2020. In February 2022 the empty pedestal was removed and the site has been paved over, making it a "normal" traffic junction.

=== Matthew Fontaine Maury Monument ===
The monument of Matthew Fontaine Maury was located on Monument Avenue at Belmont Avenue. The statue of Maury was removed on July 2, 2020, and the globe followed on July 9. The empty pedestal was removed in February 2022 and the site is now a garden.

=== Arthur Ashe Monument ===
Nearly a century after the original monuments were put in place, the Richmond community approved a statue of Arthur Ashe by Paul DiPasquale to be placed on Monument Avenue. The statue's placement lacked a correlation between the tennis star and the Confederate leaders already represented on the Avenue. Some residents thought the monument should be placed at the Arthur Ashe Athletic Center. The monument became a significant discussion point in the city around the times of its commission and its unveiling. Many of the city's residents cited Ashe's distinguished place in the modern history of the city as a reason for inclusion, while some residents and other parties rejected it as inappropriate for Monument Avenue, which had contained only statues of men with a relationship to the Confederate States of America.

Ashe's statue was the farthest one placed on the Avenue, situated in what is known as the Museum District, just west of the city's Fan district. Ashe stands, racket in hand, on a pedestal bearing the Biblical quote: “Since we are surrounded by so great a cloud of witnesses, let us lay aside every weight, and the sin which so easily ensnares us, and let us run with endurance the race that is set before us.”

== Controversy ==
The Confederate memorials on Monument Avenue have been a source of controversy from time to time since they were first built. Opponents have pointed to their roots in the "Lost Cause" and Virginia's "Massive Resistance" to racial integration of public schools to argue that the statues symbolize white supremacy and should be removed or revised. Proponents of preservation recognize the monuments as veterans' memorials erected to commemorate the hundreds of thousands of Confederate soldiers and citizens who died fighting to defend Richmond during the Civil War. The removal movement gained momentum following a similar controversy with Charlottesville, Virginia's Robert E. Lee statue and the subsequent events of the "Unite The Right" rally on August 11–12, 2017.

In late 2017, Mayor Levar Stoney announced the formation of a "Monument Avenue Commission" that was chartered to solicit the public's input and ultimately provide recommendations on the future of the monuments. In mid-2018, the Commission issued its recommendations, calling for the removal of the Jefferson Davis monument while expressing a desire to attach signage "reinterpreting" the Lee, Jackson, Stuart and Maury monuments.

During the 2020 protests that erupted after the murder of George Floyd in Minneapolis, the statues again became a focal point in Richmond. They became a frequent site for both peaceful as well as violent protests. Throughout this period, the statues were covered in graffiti and surrounded with materials such as signs, artwork, candles, and flowers. Richmond-based artists Dustin Klein and Alex Criqui created Reclaiming the Monument, a series of light projections that transformed the Confederate statues at night, in particular the Robert E. Lee Monument. In June 2020, Governor Ralph Northam announced he had been working for a full year on plans to remove the Lee monument from the avenue. Immediately following Gov. Northam's announcement, Richmond's Mayor Stoney announced plans to remove the other four Confederate statues along with seven additional related monuments throughout the city. The City of Richmond began work to remove the city-controlled statues, beginning with the Stonewall Jackson monument, on July 1, 2020. Matthew Maury's statue was removed on July 2, and J. E. B. Stuart's on July 7. The Lee Monument was removed by the Commonwealth of Virginia on September 8, 2021.

== Disposition of the monuments ==
The statues are presently in an open-air industrial area in Richmond, whose location has been withheld. Richmond recently transferred ownership of the fallen memorials to the Black History Museum and Cultural Center of Virginia; it is now up to the institution to decide what to do with them.

In the fall of 2023, the Jefferson Davis statue will travel to Los Angeles, where it will be exhibited as part of a display of toppled Confederate art works.

== See also ==
- Lee–Jackson–King Day, a Virginia holiday from 1984 to 2000 honoring two Confederate leaders and Martin Luther King, Jr.
- List of Confederate monuments and memorials
- List of monuments and memorials removed during the George Floyd protests#Confederate monuments
- List of National Historic Landmarks in Virginia
- List of works by Antonin Mercié
- Lost Cause of the Confederacy
- National Register of Historic Places listings in Richmond, Virginia
