= Timeline of Virginia history =

This article is a timeline of the history of the Commonwealth of Virginia in the United States.

== Pre-European Era and 16th century ==
- Prior to the arrival of Europeans, the Great Indian Warpath had a branch that led from present-day Lynchburg to present-day Richmond.
- 1585 – Walter Raleigh is granted a charter by Queen Elizabeth I, naming the North American coast "Virginia" in tribute to her. This leads to the establishment of a colony on Roanoke Island with 108 men.
- 1590 – John White and the Watts expedition men discover the Roanoke Colony abandoned

== 16th century ==
=== 1600s ===
- 1602 – Captain Bartholomew Gosnold, Captain Bartholomew Gilbert, Captain Gabriel Archer, and others explore the New World coast with the intention of starting a colony but occupy Cuttyhunk Island for only a few weeks before returning to England
- 1606
  - April 10 – Virginia Company of London is formed by Bartholomew Gosnold from a charter from King James I of England, with plans to create a proprietary colony in "Virginia" (which describes coastline that is now known as Carolinas and north to New England)
  - Drought begins in Eastern Virginia and the Tidewater region. It will last six-years, affecting colonists and natives alike.
- 1607
  - Chief Powhatan inherits the Powhatan Confederacy of about 4–6 tribes, with its base at the Fall Line near present-day Richmond and with political domain over much of eastern Tidewater Virginia, an area known to the Powhatans as "Tsenacommacah."
  - April 26 – First landing of the English settlers occurs at Cape Henry
  - April 30 – European settlers arrived at Old Point Comfort and established settlement of Mill Creek (later Phoebus) just outside the Algonquin village of Kecoughtan.
  - May – Settlers deposit three pigs on Hog Island for safekeeping.
  - May 14 – Jamestown Island is selected (by decree of Edward Maria Wingfield) as the settlement site. The settlement is named "James His Towne" in tribute to James I of England.
  - May 21 – Christopher Newport, Gabriel Archer, and other explorers visit the Weanock native people
  - June 15 – Initial construction of James Fort concludes.
  - June 22 – Jamestown colonists begin to succumb to disease due to non-potable water and mosquito-borne illnesses. Chief Powhatan sends corn and venison to the malnourished Jamestown settlers.
  - September 10 – Council President Edward Maria Wingfield is deposed/impeached and arrested for allegedly hoarding food. John Ratcliffe becomes president. George Kendall is imprisoned for mutiny, and held on the Discovery.
  - December – John Smith is taken by Opechancanough to Werowocomoco, either to be inducted as a ceremonial tribe member or to be executed. Pocahantas participates.
- 1608
  - January – Only 38 to 40 colonists remain alive.
- 1609
  - Fort Algernon is built near Jamestown.
  - September – Captain John Smith, now President of Virginia Colony, sends another force of 120 men under Francis West to settle "West's Fort" in what is now the Rockett's neighborhood; Smith then purchases the Powhatan village from the chief Parahunt and renames it "Nonsuch", however, the native inhabitants resist the settlers, forcing them to return to Jamestown.

=== 1610s ===
- 1611
  - Fort Algernon, Fort Charles, and Fort Henry were built.
  - First Anglo-Powhatan War begins, resulting in a seven-year "Peace of Pocahontas" between the English and the Powhatan confederacy.
  - May 24 – Thomas Gates and Thomas Dale issue Lawes Divine, Morall and Martiall [sic], also known as "Dale's Code", a martial law/authoritarian system of government.
  - July 9 – European settlers permanently drove out the Native Americans from Kecoughtan.
- 1611
  - Henricus is founded on Farrar's Island
  - Puritan Reverend Alexander Whitaker arrives in Jamestown.
  - John Rolfe cultivates Nicotiana tabacum as a viable cash crop for smoking tobacco (marketed as "Orinoco tobacco")
- 1612
  - Drought in Eastern Virginia and the Tidewater region finally ends.
  - The town of "New London" (later named St. George's) is founded, becoming the oldest continuously inhabited British town in the New World.
- 1613
  - Thomas Dale founds "Bermuda Cittie", which was renamed to be "Charles City" (and then later, City Point, Virginia)
  - April 13 – Samuel Argall abducts Pocahontas for use in prisoner exchange for return of English captives by Powhatan
- 1614
  - First Anglo-Powhatan War ends.
- 1615 – Pocahontas gives birth to a son, Thomas Rolfe, at Varina Farms
- 1619
  - July 30 – The first Virginia General Assembly convenes at the Jamestown Church. Dale's Code is no longer law.
  - August – First Africans in Virginia landed at Point Comfort.

=== 1620s ===
- 1622
  - Second Anglo-Powhatan War made living away from Jamestown treacherous for colonial settlers. Attempts to continue settlement at Henricus continued, but only 22 inhabitants and 10 "dwelling houses" were there in May 1625.
  - December 20 – Ship Abigail arrives with hungry, diseased passengers. The colony is reduced to 500 settlers over the winter.
- 1623
  - The Virginia House of Burgesses creates a five-member appellate court, which is to meet quarterly to hear appeals from the lower courts.
- 1624
  - May 24 – The Virginia Company's royal charter is revoked due to overwhelming financial and political problems, making the Colony of Virginia a Crown colony (under royal authority) instead of a proprietary colony. The General Assembly is dissolved.
- 1629 – Charles I of England grants his attorney general, Robert Heath, title and land south of Virginia. Dubbed "Carolana", it comprised present-day North Carolina, Georgia, and other parts of the Deep South.

=== 1630s ===
- 1632 – Second Anglo-Powhatan War ends.
- 1634 – Syms School is established, becoming America's first free public school.
- 1635 – Captain Thomas Harris plants a tobacco farm at Curles Neck.
- 1639
  - The King formally approves the restoration of the General Assembly.
  - Lynnhaven Parish Church is built.

=== 1640s ===
- 1644 – Third Anglo-Powhatan War begins.
- 1645
  - Third Anglo-Powhatan War ends.
  - To secure the border between the English and the Native Americans, the English built Fort Charles built at falls of the James and Fort Henry (commanded by Abraham Wood) at the falls of the Appomattox River.
- 1646
  - Opchanacanough dies, and leaves Necotowance as the Weroance (chief) of the Pamunkey tribe.
  - Peace Treaty of 1646 ends Anglo-Powhatan War by giving English control of territory as far west as Mowhemencho (now Bernard's Creek on the James in Powhatan County, Virginia), as well as granted an exclusive enclave between the York and Blackwater Rivers. This physically separated the Nansemonds, Weyanokes and Appomattox, who retreated southward, from the other Powhatan tribes then occupying the Middle Peninsula and Northern Neck, and effectively ends the Powhatan Confederacy

=== 1650s ===
- 1654 – New Kent County was created from York County. The county's name originated because several prominent inhabitants, including William Claiborne, recently had been forced from their settlement at Kent Island, Maryland by Lord Baltimore upon the formation of Maryland.
- 1656
  - Battle of Bloody Run -- Mahocks, Nahyssans and Rehecrechians, recently defeated by the Five Nations in the Beaver Wars, camp at what is now called Church Hill. They combat a combined force of English and Pamunkey, and the spring runs red with blood, including that of dead Pamunkey chief Totopotomoi. Cockacoeske becomes chief of the Pamunkeys.
- 1658 — The first Indian reservation in the New World, the Pamunkey Indian Reservation, is established east of present-day Richmond.

=== 1670s ===
- 1676
  - July 30 – Declaration of the People of Virginia.
  - September 18 – Jamestown is burned/torched by Bacon's Rebellion forces. The Pamunkeys (led by Cockacoeske) and other tribes assist Nathaniel Bacon in his rebellion.
  - October – Nathaniel Bacon dies, marking a death knell to the rebellion.
  - Legislature temporarily uses Middle Plantation as a statehouse.

=== 1680s ===
- 1680 – Town of Hampton was established per "Act of Cohabitation."
- 1682 – Norfolk Town founded.

=== 1690s ===
- 1691 – King and Queen County is created from New Kent County.
- 1693 – College of William & Mary is established by royal charter.
- 1697 – Population estimate for the Virginia colony is 70,000.
- 1699 – Jamestown Colony capital permanently moves to Middle Plantation, which is renamed Williamsburg.

== 17th century ==
=== 1700s ===
- 1702
  - King William County is created out of King and Queen County

=== 1710s ===
- 1710 William Randolph's 2nd son Thomas begins building Tuckahoe Plantation at Manakin Town.
- 1715 – Hampton designated seat of Elizabeth City County.
- 1718 – Head of dead pirate Blackbeard was displayed on a pole at place later known as "Blackbeard's Point."
- 1719 – Hanover County was created on November 26, 1719, from the area of New Kent County called St. Paul's Parish.

=== 1720s ===
- 1728
  - Goochland County (named after the new royal lieutenant governor Sir William Gooch is formed; this is the first county formed from Henrico Shire.
  - Caroline County was established from Essex, King and Queen, and King William counties.

=== 1730s ===
- 1733 – Richmond named by William Byrd II, after Richmond upon Thames, England.
- 1735
  - Amelia County was created from parts of Prince George and Brunswick counties. It was named in honor of Princess Amelia of Great Britain.
- 1736 – Town of Newport News
- attains borough status.

=== 1740s ===
- 1742 – Town of Richmond incorporated.
- 1743 – Thomas Jefferson is born at Shadwell Plantation.
- 1744
  - Virginia General Assembly creates Albemarle County from the western portion of Goochland County.
- 1749
  - Augusta Academy is founded.
  - Alexandria founded.
  - Chesterfield County is created from land carved out of Henrico County.
  - Cumberland County is created from land carved out of Goochland County.
  - The Coastal Hurricane of 1749 hit the Hampton Roads area, destroyed Fort George and created Willoughby Spit.

=== 1750s ===
- 1752
  - February – Virginia House of Burgesses grants the fourth city charter in Virginia to Winchester.
  - Portsmouth founded by politician William Crawford; named after Portsmouth, England.
- 1753
  - August 10 – Edmund Randolph is born in Williamsburg.

=== 1760s ===
- 1767 – Gosport Shipyard, later renamed the Norfolk Naval Shipyard, founded by Andrew Sprowle.

=== 1770s ===
- 1775
  - Second Virginia Convention held at St. John's Episcopal Church where Patrick Henry proclaims "Give me liberty or give me death!."
  - James River bateau begin to ply the waters between Lynchburg and Richmond.
  - Hampden–Sydney College is founded in Hampden Sydney, Virginia. It is the oldest privately chartered college in the Southern United States.
  - October 24 – British troops directed by John Murray, 4th Earl of Dunmore raided Hampton, but were repulsed by patriot Virginia Militia
  - November 15 – Battle of Kemp's Landing.
- 1776
  - Augusta Academy is renamed Liberty Hall Academy.
  - January 1 – Burning of Norfolk.
  - July 5 – Patrick Henry becomes the 1st Governor of Virginia.
- 1777
  - May – the Virginia General Assembly creates Powhatan County out of land from the eastern portion of Cumberland County between the Appomattox and James rivers.
- 1779
  - The Supreme Court of Appeals is established. It later becomes the Supreme Court of Virginia and is one of the oldest continuously active judicial bodies in the United States.
  - Town of Alexandria incorporated.
  - June 1 – Thomas Jefferson becomes the 2nd Governor of Virginia.

=== 1780s ===
- 1780
  - Under Governor Thomas Jefferson, the Virginia capital moves to Richmond from Williamsburg to make it more secure from British attack.
- 1781
  - January 1 — Raid of Richmond begins. Turncoat Benedict Arnold sets fire to the city and area plantations.
  - January 19 — Raid of Richmond ends.
  - June 4 – William Fleming becomes the 3rd Governor of Virginia, serving for only eight days.
  - June 12 – Thomas Nelson Jr. becomes the 4th Governor of Virginia.
  - September 5 — Battle of the Chesapeake. A British fleet led by Rear Admiral Sir Thomas Graves and a French fleet led by Rear Admiral François Joseph Paul battle near the mouth of the Chesapeake Bay. The French win, providing the Franco-American army with siege artillery and French reinforcements. These proved decisive in the Siege of Yorktown, effectively securing independence for the Thirteen Colonies.
  - December 1 – Benjamin Harrison V becomes the 5th Governor of Virginia.
- 1784
  - December 1 – Patrick Henry becomes the 6th Governor of Virginia, after previously serving as the 1st Governor of Virginia from 1776–1779.
- 1785
  - Virginia State Capitol building constructed.
  - Mason's Hall built.
  - One of the Midlothian's first coal mines, Black Heath opens.
- 1786
  - Lynchburg founded.
  - Richmond Theatre opens.
  - December 1 – Edmund Randolph becomes the 7th Governor of Virginia.
- 1788
  - Virginia Ratifying Convention meets at Richmond's theater in Court End from June 2 through June 27 and agrees to ratify the US Constitution.
  - Legislative acts take Nottoway Parish, a district of Amelia County, and establish a new county, Nottoway County.
  - Kahal Kadosh Beth Shalome forms the first Jewish congregation in Virginia and the sixth oldest congregation in the United States. The congregation would not build a synagogue until 1822.
  - December 1 – Beverley Randolph becomes the 8th Governor of Virginia.
- 1789 – A portion of Fairfax County, including Alexandria, is ceded to the federal government.

=== 1790s ===
- 1790
  - James River Company opens the first commercial canal in the United States, stretching from Richmond to Westham and paralleling the James for 7 miles (11 km).
- 1791
  - December 1 – Henry Lee III becomes the 9th Governor of Virginia.
- 1794
  - December 1 – Robert Brooke becomes the 10th Governor of Virginia.
- 1795 – Fort Norfolk built.
- 1796
  - December 1 – James Wood becomes the 11th Governor of Virginia.
- 1799
  - December 28 – James Monroe becomes the 12th Governor of Virginia.

== 18th century ==
=== 1800s ===
- 1800
  - Gabriel's Rebellion.
- 1802
  - December 1 – John Page becomes the 13th Governor of Virginia.
- 1805
  - Syms School and Eaton School are merged by act of the Virginia General Assembly and are jointly called Hampton Academy.
  - Dismal Swamp Canal opens.
  - Town of Lynchburg incorporated.
  - December 7 – William H. Cabell becomes the 14th Governor of Virginia.
- 1806
  - Construction of Thomas Jefferson's Poplar Forest begins near Lynchburg.
- 1807
  - Chief Justice of the United States John Marshall (a resident of Richmond) presides over the Burr conspiracy trial in Richmond.
- 1808
  - December 1 – John Tyler Sr. becomes the 15th Governor of Virginia.

=== 1810s ===
- 1811
  - January 16 – James Monroe becomes the 16th Governor of Virginia, after having served as the 12th Governor of Virginia from 1799–1802.
  - April 3 – George William Smith becomes the 17th Governor of Virginia.
  - Richmond Theatre fire in Court End kills many prominent citizens.
  - Virginia Governor's Mansion built.
  - One of Virginia's first charitable institutions, the Female Humane Association is founded in Richmond.
  - December 26 – Peyton Randolph becomes the acting Governor of Virginia for eight days.
- 1812
  - January 3 – James Barbour becomes the 18th Governor of Virginia.
  - June 18 – War of 1812 begins
- 1813
  - Hampton was taken by British forces during the War of 1812.
  - Augusta Academy is renamed Washington College.
- 1814
  - December 1 – Wilson Cary Nicholas becomes the 19th Governor of Virginia.
- 1815 – War of 1812 ends.
- 1816
  - December 1 – James Patton Preston becomes the 20th Governor of Virginia.
- 1819
  - Thomas Jefferson founds the University of Virginia in Charlottesville. The original governing Board of Visitors includes three U.S. presidents: Jefferson, James Madison, and James Monroe.
  - December 1 – Thomas Mann Randolph Jr. becomes the 21st Governor of Virginia.

=== 1820s ===
- 1822
  - December 1 – James Pleasants becomes the 22nd Governor of Virginia.
- 1823
  - Virginia Theological Seminary founded.
  - State Library founded.
  - Colonization Society of Virginia formed.
- 1825
  - December 10 – John Tyler becomes the 23rd Governor of Virginia.
- 1827
  - Norfolk Naval Hospital opens. It would later be renamed Naval Medical Center Portsmouth.
  - March 4 – William Branch Giles becomes the 24th Governor of Virginia.
- 1828 – Franklin and Armfield slave traders in business.

=== 1830s ===
- 1830
  - Randolph–Macon College is founded in Boydton.
  - March 4 – John Floyd becomes the 25th Governor of Virginia.
  - June 8 – At a meeting of the Baptist General Association of Virginia it was decided "that the Baptists of this State form an education society for the improvement of the ministry."
  - August – Dunlora Academy is founded.
- 1832
  - July 1 – Dunlora Academy becomes Virginia Baptist Seminary.
- 1834
  - March 31 – Littleton Waller Tazewell becomes the 26th Governor of Virginia.
- 1836
  - Wyndham Robertson becomes the acting Governor of Virginia until 1837.
  - Emory and Henry University is founded in Emory.
- 1837
  - March 31 – David Campbell becomes the 27th Governor of Virginia.

=== 1840s ===
- 1840
  - James River and Kanawha Canal from Lynchburg to Richmond opens.
  - March 31 – Thomas Walker Gilmer becomes the 28th Governor of Virginia.
- 1841
  - March 20 – John M. Patton becomes the acting Governor of Virginia for 11 days.
  - March 31 – John Rutherfoord becomes the acting Governor of Virginia for one year.
- 1842
  - March 31 – John Munford Gregory becomes the acting Governor of Virginia until January 1, 1843.
- 1843
  - Alexandria Canal to Georgetown opens.
  - Virginia Baptist Seminary becomes Richmond College.
  - January 1 – James McDowell becomes the 29th Governor of Virginia.
- 1846
  - January 1 – William Smith becomes the 30th Governor of Virginia.
- 1847 – Alexandria retroceded to Virginia.
- 1849
  - January 1 – John B. Floyd becomes the 31st Governor of Virginia.
  - March – Town of Hampton incorporated.
  - December – Town of Hampton's incorporation repealed.

=== 1850s ===
- 1852
  - Town of Hampton incorporated again.
  - Virginia & Tennessee Railroad begins operating.
  - January 16 – Joseph Johnson becomes the 32nd Governor of Virginia.
- 1855 – Yellow fever outbreak in Norfolk and Portsmouth; over 3,000 people die.
- 1856 – January 1 – Henry A. Wise becomes the 33rd Governor of Virginia.
- 1857 – Chesapeake Female College was built.
- 1858
  - City of Portsmouth incorporated as an independent city (separated from Norfolk County)
  - Norfolk and Petersburg Railroad laid out.

=== 1860s ===
- 1860
  - Town of Hampton's incorporation repealed again.
  - January 1 – John Letcher becomes the 34th Governor of Virginia.
- 1861
  - April 12 – Civil War begins. Virginia joins the Confederate States of America.
  - May 15 – Francis Harrison Pierpont becomes the Governor of the Restored Government of Virginia.
  - May 19 – Battle of Sewell's Point.
  - December 20 – Battle of Dranesville.
- 1862
  - March 8 – Battle of Hampton Roads.
  - March 23 – First Battle of Kernstown
  - May 25 – First Battle of Winchester
  - August 22 – First Battle of Rappahannock Station.
  - August 28 – Battle of Thoroughfare Gap. Confederate victory.
- 1863
  - January 1 – The Emancipation Proclamation frees enslaved people in states in rebellion against the United States.
  - March 17 – Battle of Kelly's Ford.
  - April 2 – Bread riot.
  - June 9 – Battle of Brandy Station.
  - June 17 – Battle of Aldie.
  - June 19 – Battle of Middleburg.
- June 20 – The Restored Government of Virginia becomes part of West Virginia and Arthur I. Boreman replaces Francis Harrison Pierpont, becoming the 1st Governor of West Virginia. Francis Harrison Pierpont remains a disputed Unionist Governor of Virginia.
  - June 21 – Battle of Upperville.
  - July 23 – Battle of Manassas Gap.
  - August – Alexandria becomes seat of Restored Government of Virginia.
  - October 19 – Battle of Buckland Mills. Confederate victory.
  - November 7 – Second Battle of Rappahannock Station.
- 1864
  - January 1 – William Smith becomes the 35th Governor of Virginia for the Confederates, after previously serving as the 30th Governor of Virginia. Francis Harrison Pierpont remains the Unionist Governor of Virginia.
  - May 4 – Overland Campaign begins.
  - Bermuda Hundred Campaign.
    - May 6 –Battle of Port Walthall Junction. Port Walthall is destroyed.
    - May 9 – Battle of Swift Creek.
    - May 10 – Battle of Chester Station.
    - May 12 – Battle of Proctor's Creek begins.
    - May 16 – Battle of Proctor's Creek ends.
    - May 20 – Battle of Ware Bottom Church.
  - June 17 – Battle of Lynchburg.
  - June 9 – Siege of Petersburg begins.
  - June 24 – Overland Campaign ends.
  - July 17 – Battle of Cool Spring at Snicker's Gap.
  - July 24 – Second Battle of Kernstown.
  - September 3 – Battle of Berryville.
  - September 19 – Third Battle of Winchester.
  - October 19 – Battle of Cedar Creek.
- 1865
  - March 25 – Siege of Petersburg ends.
  - May 9 – Francis Harrison Pierpont is recognized by President Andrew Johnson as the official Governor of Virginia.
  - May 26 – Civil War ends. Mayor Joseph Mayo surrenders to Union Army forces at Tree Hill. Richmonder and Union Spy Elizabeth Van Lew is the first to hoist the US flag in Richmond.
  - December 6 – Thirteenth Amendment to the United States Constitution is ratified. Slavery is officially abolished in the U.S.
  - Convention of the Colored People of Virginia held in Alexandria.
- 1867
  - Black suffrage granted.
  - Virginia Baptist State Convention organized during a meeting in Portsmouth.
- 1868
  - Randolph–Macon College moves to Ashland.
  - April 4 – Henry H. Wells becomes the provisional Governor of Virginia.
  - September 21 – Gilbert C. Walker becomes the provisional Governor of Virginia. He later becomes the 36th Governor of Virginia.

=== 1870s ===
- 1870
  - Alexandria becomes independent of Alexandria County.
  - First Richmond municipal election where Freedmen can vote.
  - A tragic collapse at the Virginia State Capitol occurs as the overly large crowd seeks remove Reconstruction Era mayor George Chahoon. Sixty-two people were killed and 251 injured.
  - January 1 – Gilbert C. Walker becomes the 36th Governor of Virginia.
- 1871
  - Washington College is renamed Washington and Lee University.
- 1872
  - Virginia Agricultural and Mechanical College is founded with federal funds provided by the Morrill Act of 1862. It is a land-grant military institute. Addison Caldwell is the first student to register, registering on October 1, 1872, after hiking over 25 miles from his home in Craig County, Virginia.
- 1874 – January 1 – James L. Kemper becomes the 37th Governor of Virginia.
- 1877 – Norfolk and Portsmouth Cotton Exchange incorporated.
- 1878 – January 1 – Frederick W. M. Holliday becomes the 38th Governor of Virginia.

=== 1880s ===
- 1880
  - James Albert Bonsack invents cigarette rolling machine.
  - Old Dominion Land Company created by Collis Potter Huntington "to secure railway right-of-ways" on the Virginia Peninsula.
  - James H. Dooley opens the Richmond and Alleghany Railroad along the route of the James River and Kanawha Canal.
- 1882
  - Chesapeake and Ohio Railway begins operating.
  - January 1 – William E. Cameron becomes the 39th Governor of Virginia.
- 1886
  - January 1 – Fitzhugh Lee becomes the 40th Governor of Virginia.
- 1887 – Town of Hampton incorporated once again.
- 1888
  - Richmond Union Passenger Railway (electric trolley) begins operating.
  - Oceanfront Boardwalk built.
  - July – The Virginia State Bar Association is founded in Virginia Beach as a voluntary statewide organization to promote the ethical practice of law in the state.

=== 1890s ===
- 1890
  - January 1 – Philip W. McKinney becomes the 41st Governor of Virginia.
- 1893 – Randolph-Macon Woman's College opens.
- 1894
  - The city of Richmond opens a brand new gothic-styled City Hall.
  - Confederate Soldiers and Sailors Monument unveiled.
  - After the Richmond Terminal Company went bankrupt in 1892, J. P. Morgan merged the Richmond and Danville Railroad, the Richmond and York River Railroad, and other holdings into the Southern Railway (U.S.) based in Washington, D.C.
  - January 1 – Charles T. O'Ferrall becomes the 42nd Governor of Virginia.
- 1896
  - Virginia Agricultural and Mechanical College is renamed Virginia Agricultural and Mechanical College and Polytechnic Institute.
  - Syms-Eaton Academy becomes Hampton High School.
- 1897
  - April 22 – The lynching of Joseph H. McCoy in Alexandria.
  - July 21 – First Annual Hampton Negro Conference was held at the Hampton Institute.
- 1898
  - Union Theological Seminary relocates to Richmond.
  - January 1 – James Hoge Tyler becomes the 43rd Governor of Virginia.
- 1899
  - August 8 – The lynching of Benjamin Thomas in Alexandria.

== 19th century ==
=== 1900s ===
- 1902
  - John Roll McLean, Stephen Benton Elkins and Jean-Pierre Guenard purchase a charter for the Great Falls and Old Dominion Railroad.
  - January 1 – Andrew Jackson Montague becomes the 44th Governor of Virginia.
- 1903
  - Richmond Times-Dispatch newspaper begins publication.
  - Virginia Christian College founded.
- 1906
  - Town of Virginia Beach incorporated.
  - McLean railroad completed, connecting the Northern Virginia with Washington, D.C.
  - February 1 – Claude A. Swanson becomes the 45th Governor of Virginia.
- 1907 – Doumar's Cones and BBQ opens in Norfolk.
- 1908
  - Virginia State School for Colored Deaf and Blind Children opens.

=== 1910s ===
- 1910
  - Community of McLean established, when the communities of Lewinsville and Langley merge.
  - State Normal and Industrial School for Women at Radford is founded.
  - February 10 – William Hodges Mann becomes the 46th Governor of Virginia.
- 1914
  - February 1 – Henry Carter Stuart becomes the 47th Governor of Virginia.
  - July 28 – World War I begins.
- 1917
  - U.S. military Langley Field (airfield) and its Langley Memorial Aeronautical Laboratory (later NASA Langley Research Center) begin operating.
  - U.S. Naval Station Norfolk opens on Sewell's Point peninsula
- 1918
  - In Portsmouth, the Truxtun neighborhood is developed by the United States Housing Corporation to meet the housing needs for the influx of workers at the Norfolk Naval Shipyard during World War I. It is the first wartime government housing project constructed exclusively for African-American residents.
  - February 1 – Westmoreland Davis becomes the 48th Governor of Virginia.
  - November 11 – World War I ends.

=== 1920s ===
- 1920
  - September 21 – Richmond College is renamed the University of Richmond.
- 1921
  - Virginia Polytechnic Institute admits its first female students.
- 1922
  - Edgar Allan Poe Museum opens.
  - White Supremacist Earnest Sevier Cox and white musician John Powell founded the Anglo-Saxon Clubs of America in Richmond and begin to agitate for Anti-miscegenation laws and, eventually, Virginia's Racial Integrity Act of 1924.
  - February 1 – E. Lee Trinkle becomes the 49th Governor of Virginia.
- 1924
  - State Normal and Industrial School for Women at Radford is renamed State Teachers College at Radford.
- 1926
  - February 1 – Harry F. Byrd becomes the 50th Governor of Virginia.
- 1927
  - Richard Evelyn Byrd Flying Field is dedicated.
- 1928
  - James River Bridge opens.
  - After four years of planning and site selection, construction of the Virginia World War I Memorial Carillon begins in Byrd Park in 1928. It was dedicated in 1932.
  - Byrd Theatre opens.

=== 1930s ===
- 1930
  - Mariners' Museum founded.
  - January 15 – John Garland Pollard becomes the 51st Governor of Virginia.
- 1934
  - Tri-State Gang members (Walter Leganza, Bobby Mais, and others) terrorize Richmond by hijacking a federal reserve truck behind Broad Street Station. They were executed in Richmond in 1935. The three-state crime spree was later dramatized in the 1950 film Highway 301
  - January 18 – George C. Peery becomes the 52nd Governor of Virginia.
- 1935 – Norfolk Unit of Virginia State University opens. In 1969, it became Norfolk State College and a university in 1979.
- 1936
  - Richmond National Battlefield Park established.
  - Virginia Museum of Fine Arts opens.
- 1938
  - The Virginia General Assembly passes a law establishing the Virginia State Bar, the administrative agency of the Supreme Court of Virginia. Membership in good standing is mandatory for attorneys wishing to practice law in Virginia.
  - January 19 – James Hubert Price becomes the 53rd Governor of Virginia.
- 1939
  - September 1 – World War II begins.

=== 1940s ===
- 1940
  - US War Department re-establishes Camp Lee for the purpose of training Quartermaster soldiers for World War II.
- 1942
  - January 21 – Colgate Darden becomes the 54th Governor of Virginia.
- 1943
  - U.S. Langley Research Center's racially segregated West Area Computers began operating.
  - State Teachers College at Radford merges with Virginia Polytechnic Institute.
- 1944
  - Virginia Polytechnic Institute is renamed Virginia Agricultural and Mechanical College and Polytechnic Institute.
- 1945
  - September 2 – World War II ends.
- 1946
  - January 16 – William M. Tuck becomes the 55th Governor of Virginia.

=== 1950s ===
- 1950
  - January 18 – John S. Battle becomes the 56th Governor of Virginia.
- 1952
  - City of Virginia Beach incorporated.
  - Marden House designed by Frank Lloyd Wright in McLean.
  - July 1: Elizabeth City County consolidated into city of Hampton.
- 1954
  - Davis v. County School Board of Prince Edward County is decided as part of the 1954 Brown v. Board of Education ruling (officially overturned racial segregation in U.S. public schools). the Davis case was the work of Richmond civil rights attorneys Oliver Hill and Spottswood William Robinson III who took on the state's law firm of Hunton & Williams, also based in Richmond.
  - January 20 – Thomas B. Stanley becomes the 57th Governor of Virginia.
- 1958
  - January 11 – J. Lindsay Almond becomes the 58th Governor of Virginia.

=== 1960s ===
- 1960
  - Interstate 64 highway construction was completed.
- 1961
  - Children's Hospital of The King's Daughters opens.
  - Christopher Newport College opens.
  - The George Bush Center for Intelligence headquarters of the Central Intelligence Agency opens in McLean (formally unnamed, renamed in 1999)
  - The Portsmouth-Norfolk Tides begin playing.
- 1962
  - January 13 – Albertis Harrison becomes the 59th Governor of Virginia.
- 1964
  - The merger between the State Teachers College at Radford and Virginia Polytechnic Institute ends. Radford College is established.
- 1966
  - Great Falls Park is established by the National Park Service.
  - January 15 – Mills Godwin becomes the 60th Governor of Virginia.
- 1967
  - June 12 – Loving v. Virginia is decided. The U.S. Supreme Court rules that the laws banning interracial marriage violate the Equal Protection and Due Process Clauses of the Fourteenth Amendment to the U.S. Constitution.
  - John Tyler Community College established in Chester.
- 1968
  - Virginia General Assembly merged Medical College of Virginia with the Richmond Professional Institute to create Virginia Commonwealth University.
  - Opening of Tysons Corner Center, one of the first fully enclosed, climate-controlled shopping malls in the Washington metropolitan area.
- 1969
  - Norfolk State College becomes independent from Petersburg's Virginia State College. In 1979, it becomes a university.
  - Econo-Travel motel, the first in the United States, opens for business in Norfolk. As of 2018, it is still operating.

=== 1970s ===
- 1970
  - Judge Robert R. Merhige Jr. orders the University of Virginia to admit women.
  - Hampton Coliseum was opened.
  - The state legislature grants Virginia Polytechnic College university status and gives it its present legal name, Virginia Polytechnic Institute and State University.
  - January 17 – Linwood Holton becomes the 61st Governor of Virginia.
- 1971
  - Norfolk Scope conventional hall opens.
  - Lynchburg Baptist College (later Liberty University) founded.
  - September – School "court-ordered busing" begins.
- 1972
  - Chrysler Hall opens.
  - Radford College becomes a coeducational institution.
  - The General Assembly establishes the first two public defender offices in Staunton and Virginia Beach. This becomes the Public Defender Commission.
  - January – Judge Robert R. Merhige Jr. rules that students in Henrico and Chesterfield counties have to be bused to the Richmond city schools in order to decrease the high percentage of black students in Richmond's schools.
- 1974
  - Virginia Opera is formed.
  - January 12 – Mills Godwin becomes the 62nd Governor of Virginia, after previously serving as the 60th Governor of Virginia.
- 1977
  - Christendom College, a private, Catholic college, is founded in Front Royal.
  - Christian Broadcasting Network University is founded in Virginia Beach. It would later be renamed Regent University.
- 1978
  - January 14 – John N. Dalton becomes the 63rd Governor of Virginia.
- 1979
  - Radford College is granted the status of university.
  - Hampton Roads Naval Museum is established.
  - September – Hurricane David.

=== 1980s ===
- 1980 – The Tidewater Children's Museum is established by volunteers from the Portsmouth Service League in the basement of the Portsmouth Library's main branch.
- 1981 – Richard Joseph Davis is elected Lieutenant Governor of Virginia, becoming the first Catholic elected to a statewide office in Virginia history.
- 1982
  - Finite element machine is invented at NASA Langley Research Center (approximate date).
  - January 16 – Chuck Robb becomes the 64th Governor of Virginia.
- 1984
  - Hampton University becomes active.
  - Angelos Bible College opens.
- 1986
  - January 18 – Gerald Baliles becomes the 65th Governor of Virginia.
- 1989 – Virginia Museum of Contemporary Art opens.

=== 1990s ===
- 1990
  - January 13 – Douglas Wilder becomes the 66th Governor of Virginia.
- 1992
  - Virginia Air and Space Center is established.
  - Monitor–Merrimac Memorial Bridge–Tunnel opens.
  - Newport News/Williamsburg International Airport new terminal built.
- 1993
  - Harbor Park stadium opens.
- 1994
  - Nauticus, The National Maritime Center museum, opens in Downtown Norfolk.
  - January 15 – George Allen becomes the 67th Governor of Virginia.
- 1996
  - July – Hurricane Bertha.
- 1998
  - January 17 – Jim Gilmore becomes the 68th Governor of Virginia.

== 20th century ==
=== 2000s ===
- 2000 – Patrick Henry College is established in Purcellville.
- 2001 – First Apple Store in the world opens in McLean.
- 2002
  - January 12 – Mark Warner becomes the 69th Governor of Virginia.
- 2004
  - The General Assembly establishes the Virginia Indigent Defense Commission, replacing the Public Defender Commission.
- 2006
  - January 14 – Tim Kaine becomes the 70th Governor of Virginia.
- 2007
  - April 16 – Virginia Tech shooting. Seung-Hui Cho, an undergraduate student at the university, kills 32 people and wounds 17 others with two semi-automatic pistols before committing suicide. Six others are injured jumping out of windows to escape Cho.

=== 2010s ===
- 2010
  - January 16 – Bob McDonnell becomes the 71st Governor of Virginia.
- 2014
  - January 11 – Terry McAuliffe becomes the 72nd Governor of Virginia.
- 2018
  - January 18 – Ralph Northam becomes the 73rd Governor of Virginia.
- 2019 – The Virginia Beach shooting occurs.

=== 2020s ===
- 2020 – Louise Lucas becomes the first woman and first African-American President pro tempore of the Senate of Virginia.
- 2021
  - March – Virginia bans capital punishment.
- 2022
  - January 15 – Glenn Youngkin becomes the 74th Governor of Virginia.
- 2023
  - Rivers Casino Portsmouth, the first permanent Casino in Virginia History, opens in Portsmouth on Victory Blvd.
  - Don Scott is unanimously nominated by his caucus to become the first black Speaker of the Virginia House of Delegates.

== See also ==
- Timeline of Alexandria, Virginia
- Timeline of Fauquier County, Virginia, in the American Civil War
- Timeline of Great Falls, Virginia
- Timeline of Hampton, Virginia
- Timeline of Jamestown, Virginia
- Timeline of Lynchburg, Virginia
- Timeline of McLean, Virginia
- Timeline of Newport News, Virginia
- Timeline of Norfolk, Virginia
- Timeline of Portsmouth, Virginia
- Timeline of Richmond, Virginia
- Timeline of Roanoke, Virginia
- Timeline of Virginia Beach, Virginia
- Timeline of women's suffrage in Virginia

== Bibliography ==
- "Hampton (Virginia)" . Encyclopædia Britannica. Vol. 12 (11th ed.). 1910. p. 906.
- Paul T. Hellmann (2006). "Virginia: Hampton". Historical Gazetteer of the United States. Taylor & Francis. ISBN 1-135-94859-3.
- Federal Writers' Project (1941), "Lynchburg", Virginia: a Guide to the Old Dominion, American Guide Series, Oxford University Press, pp. 246+, ISBN 9780403021956 – via Google Books
- Melissa Simpson (June 25, 1996), "Glance At 100 Years: A City's History 1896–Present", Daily Press, archived from the original on January 21, 2011
- Robert W. Lamb, ed. (1888). Our Twin Cities of the Nineteenth Century (Norfolk and Portsmouth). Barcroft.
- Peter Wallenstein (2000). "Richmond". In Paul Finkelman (ed.). Encyclopedia of the United States in the Nineteenth Century. Charles Scribner's Sons. ISBN 0-684-80500-6.
