= Timeline of Great Falls, Virginia =

The following is a timeline of the history of the census-designated place (CDP) of Great Falls, Virginia, USA.

== Prior to 20th century ==
- c. 1400 - Land inhabited by indigenous peoples, likely the Doeg people.
- 1608 - Expedition of region by Captain John Smith.
- c. 1700s - Colonial farm settlements begin to form in the Great Falls area.
- c. 1750s - Area surveyed by George Washington
- 1785 - The Patowmack Canal, which George Washington partially funded, began operating to give small barges the opportunity to skirt around the falls and to distribute manufactured goods and raw materials.
- c. 1800s - Area was unofficially referred to as the village of Forestville, with two churches, a grist mill and sawmill, a general store, and a two-room schoolhouse.
- 1861 - Battle of Dranesville Civil War skirmish occurred on December 20, 1861.
- 1878 - Great Falls Post Office opens.

== 20th century ==
- 1902 - John Roll McLean, Stephen Benton Elkins and Jean-Pierre Guenard purchase a charter for the Great Falls and Old Dominion Railroad.
- 1906 - Railroad completed, connecting the Great Falls area with Washington, D.C.
- 1909 - Great Falls and Old Dominion Railroad extends to Great Falls Park.
- 1920 - Great Falls Grange established.
- 1942 - Community fire department is formed.
- 1945 - Community members begin referring to the Forestville area as "Great Falls" and encourage the name change.
- 1955 - Area formally renamed Great Falls in local organizations and offices, including the Fire Department.
- 1959 - On November 15, 1959, the second Great Falls Post Office opens in theold Forestville School House, which is preserved on the Grange grounds.
- 1966 - Great Falls Park is established by the National Park Service.
- 1990 - Population: 6,945

== 21st century ==
- 2000 - Population: 8,549
- 2010 - Population: 15,427
- 2020 - Population: 14,872
- 2022 - Great Falls included in Veranda magazine's list of wealthiest cities in the United States.

== See also ==
- Great Falls, Virginia
- Timelines of other places in Virginia: Alexandria, Hampton, Lynchburg, McLean, Newport News, Norfolk, Portsmouth, Richmond, Roanoke, Virginia Beach, Virginia
