= Timeline of McLean, Virginia =

The following is a timeline of the history of the unincorporated community and census-designated place (CDP) of McLean, Virginia, USA.

== Prior to 20th century ==
- c. 1400 - Land inhabited by indigenous peoples, likely the Doeg people.
- 1608 - Expedition of region by Captain John Smith.
- c. 1750s - Area surveyed by George Washington
- c. 1790 - Construction of the Salona plantation by Richard Bland Lee
- 1814 - U.S. President James Madison and Dolley Madison seek refuge at Salona during the Burning of Washington in August 1814.
- 1826 - Duel between Henry Clay and John Randolph fought in McLean.
- 1861 - Union Army establishes Camp Griffin in the area during the Civil War.
- 1862 - Union Army establishes Fort Marcy in the area during the Civil War.
- c. 1870 - Construction of the Hickory Hill estate by George Walter.
- 1877 - St. John’s Episcopal Church built in McLean.

== 20th century ==
- 1902 - John Roll McLean, Stephen Benton Elkins and Jean-Pierre Guenard purchase a charter for the Great Falls and Old Dominion Railroad.
- 1906 - McLean railroad completed, connecting the area with Washington, D.C.
- 1910 - Community of McLean established, when the communities of Lewinsville and Langley merge.
- 1911 - McLean Post Office opens.
- 1914 - The Franklin Sherman School, Fairfax County's first consolidated public school, opens in McLean with 29 students.
- 1916 - Meetings held to establish the McLean Volunteer Fire Department.
- 1919 - Merrywood estate built in McLean.
- 1921 - Sharon Masonic Temple built in McLean.
- 1923 - McLean Baptist Church opens in McLean.
- 1931 - Madeira School moves to McLean.
- 1933 - Farm Credit Administration established - headquartered in McLean.
- 1948 - Potomac School moves to McLean.
- 1950 - U.S. Department of Transportation Turner-Fairbank Highway Research Center opens in McLean.
- 1952 - Marden House designed by Frank Lloyd Wright in McLean.
- 1955 - Opening of McLean High School
- 1955 - Hickory Hill estate purchased by John F. Kennedy and his wife, Jacqueline.
- 1957 - Dolley Madison Library opens in McLean.
- 1958 - The Washington Japanese Language School, a supplementary weekend Japanese school, is established in McLean - the oldest Japanese government-sponsored supplementary school in the U.S.
- 1961 - The George Bush Center for Intelligence headquarters of the Central Intelligence Agency opens in McLean (formally unnamed, renamed in 1999)
- 1965 - Opening of Langley High School
- 1968 - Opening of Tysons Corner Center, one of the first fully enclosed, climate-controlled shopping malls in the Washington metropolitan area.
- 1970 - Population: 17,698
- 1970 - Opening of Scott's Run Nature Preserve.
- 1973 - Opening of Claude Moore Colonial Farm.
- 1984 - Mars, Incorporated establishes its headquarters in McLean.
- 1980 - Population: 35,664
- 1988 - Opening of Tysons Galleria

== 21st century ==
- 2000 - Population: 38,929
- 2000 - Geebo founded in McLean
- 2001 - First Apple Store in the world opens in McLean.
- 2001 - USA Today moves its main headquarters to McLean.
- 2004 - Headquarters of the Office of the Director of National Intelligence opens in McLean.
- 2005 - The Girls' All-Star Softball Team from McLean Little League win the Little League Softball World Series Championship.
- 2009 - Hilton Hotels & Resorts relocated its global headquarters to McLean.
- 2012 - First Spanx store in the world opens in McLean.
- 2014 - McLean Station Washington Metro station begins operation
- 2018 - Identified in American Community Survey as the third wealthiest place in the United States, based on median household income of $190,258 and 2.6% poverty rate.
- 2020 - Population: 50,773
- 2021 - McLean is home to the nation’s 12th largest business district in the United States.

== See also ==
- McLean, Virginia
- Timelines of other places in Virginia: Alexandria, Hampton, Lynchburg, Newport News, Norfolk, Portsmouth, Richmond, Roanoke, Virginia Beach, Virginia
