= Timeline of Alexandria, Virginia =

The following is a timeline of the history of the city of Alexandria, Virginia, USA.

== 18th and 19th centuries ==
- 1749 – Alexandria founded.
- 1752 – Carlyle House (residence) built.
- 1754 – Fairfax County Courthouse built.
- 1773 – Christ Church consecrated.
- 1779 – Town of Alexandria incorporated.
- 1783 – Masonic lodge No. 39 (now Alexandria-Washington Lodge No. 22) established.
- 1784 – Virginia Journal and Alexandria Advertiser begins publication.
- 1789 – A portion of Fairfax County, including Alexandria, is ceded to the federal government.
- 1790
  - Presbyterian Meeting House built.
  - Population: 2,748.
- 1792
  - Bank of Alexandria established.
  - Stabler Apothecary in business.
- 1794
  - Gadsby's Tavern in business.
  - Alexandria Library founded.
- 1801 – Alexandria organized as a county of the District of Columbia.
- 1817 – Market House built.
- 1818 – St. Paul's Episcopal Church consecrated.
- 1823 – Virginia Theological Seminary founded.
- 1825 – Hallowell School opens.
- 1828 – Franklin and Armfield slave traders in business.
- 1830 – Population: 8,241.
- 1833 – St. John's Academy established.
- 1834 – Alexandria Gazette newspaper in publication.
- 1839
  - Lyceum built.
  - Episcopal High School founded.
- 1840 – Population: 8,459.
- 1843 – Alexandria Canal to Georgetown opens.
- 1847 – Alexandria retroceded to Virginia.
- 1852 – City of Alexandria incorporated.
- 1860 – Population: 12,652.
- 1863 – August: Alexandria becomes seat of Restored Government of Virginia.
- 1865 – Convention of the Colored People of Virginia held in city.
- 1870 – City becomes independent of Alexandria County.
- 1873 – Alexandria City Hall rebuilt.
- 1897 – The lynching of Joseph H. McCoy.
- 1899 – The lynching of Benjamin Thomas.

== 20th century ==
- 1906 – Union Station built.
- 1923 – Cornerstone of the George Washington Masonic National Memorial laid.
- 1930 – Potomac becomes part of city.
- 1937 – Alexandria Free Public Library opens.
- 1940 – Robinson Library and Vernon Theatre open.
- 1945 – Centre Theatre built.
- 1946 – Old Town Alexandria historic district established.
- 1952 - Part of Fairfax County annexed to city.
- 1954 – Historic Alexandria Foundation chartered.
- 1960 – Population: 91,023.
- 1961
  - Woodrow Wilson Bridge opens.
  - Frank E. Mann becomes mayor.
- 1967 – Charles E. Beatley becomes mayor.
- 1974 – Torpedo Factory Art Center opens.
- 1975
  - Alexandria Packet newspaper begins publication.
  - City archaeological commission formed.
- 1976 – Gadsby's Tavern museum opens.
- 1983
  - Washington Metro King Street–Old Town station, Braddock Road station, and Eisenhower Avenue station open.
  - Gifts in Kind International headquartered in Alexandria.
- 1985
  - Vola Lawson becomes city manager, the first woman to hold the position.
  - Jim Moran becomes mayor.
- 1990 – Population: 111,182.
- 1991
  - Van Dorn Street station opens.
  - Patsy Ticer becomes mayor.
- 1996
  - City website online.
  - Kerry J. Donley becomes mayor.

== 21st century ==
- 2003 – William D. Euille becomes mayor.
- 2005 – United States Patent and Trademark Office headquartered in city.
- 2010 – Population: 139,966.
- 2015 – Don Beyer becomes U.S. representative for Virginia's 8th congressional district.
- 2016 – Allison Silberberg becomes mayor.
- 2017
  - Congressional baseball shooting occurs on June 14.
  - The National Science Foundation relocates their headquarters to the Eisenhower Valley neighborhood from Arlington.
- 2019
  - Justin Wilson becomes mayor.
  - Construction begins on Potomac Yard station, slated to be the fifth Washington Metro station in the city,
- 2020 – Population reaches 159,467.
- 2022 – Landmark Mall is demolished as work begins on its redevelopment.

== See also ==
- History of Alexandria, Virginia
- National Register of Historic Places listings in Alexandria, Virginia
- List of mayors of Alexandria, Virginia
- History of Virginia
- Timeline of Washington, D.C.
- Timelines of other cities in Virginia: Hampton, Lynchburg, Newport News, Norfolk, Portsmouth, Richmond, Roanoke, Virginia Beach

== Bibliography ==
- F.H. Richardson (1905). "Alexandria, Va.". Richardson's Southern Guide. Chicago: Monarch Book Company – via Internet Archive.
- Federal Writers' Project (1941), "Alexandria", Virginia: a Guide to the Old Dominion, American Guide Series, Oxford University Press, OL 24223083M
- Diane Riker (2008), Timeline of Alexandria's Waterfront (PDF), Virginia: City of Alexandria
- Ted Pulliam; City of Alexandria (2011). Historic Alexandria: An Illustrated History. Historical Publishing Network. ISBN 978-1-935377-41-2.
