= Timeline of Hampton, Virginia =

The following is a timeline of the history of the city of Hampton, Virginia, United States.

== 17th century ==
- 1607 - April 30: European settlers arrived at Old Point Comfort and established settlement of Mill Creek (later Phoebus) just outside the Algonquin village of Kecoughtan
- 1610
  - July 9 - European settlers permanently drove out the Native Americans from Kecoughtan.
  - Fort Algernon, Fort Charles, and Fort Henry were built.
  - St. John's Church was founded.
- 1619
  - Mill Creek settlement became part of newly formed Elizabeth Cittie.
  - August: 1619 First Africans in Virginia landed at Point Comfort
- 1630 – Trading post was established.
- 1634 – Settlement became part of newly formed Elizabeth City County.
- 1680 – Town of Hampton was established per "Act of Cohabitation."

== 18th century ==
- 1705 – Hampton became a "port of entry."
- 1715 – Hampton designated seat of Elizabeth City County.
- 1718 – Head of dead pirate Blackbeard was displayed on a pole at place later known as "Blackbeard's Point."
- 1727 – St John’s church was rebuilt.
- 1728 - Fort George was built at Old Point Comfort.
- 1749 - The Coastal Hurricane of 1749 hit area, destroyed Fort George and created Willoughby Spit
- 1755 – "1,000 Acadian" travellers stayed temporarily in Hampton.
- 1775 - October 24–27: British troops directed by John Murray, 4th Earl of Dunmore raided Hampton, but were repulsed by patriot Virginia Militia
- 1788 – Hampton became part of the new U.S. state of Virginia.

== 19th century ==
- 1805 – Hampton Academy became active.
- 1813 – Hampton was taken by British forces during the War of 1812.
- 1823 – U.S. Fort Monroe was built.
- 1849
  - March: Town of Hampton incorporated.
  - December: Town incorporation repealed.
- 1852 – Town incorporated again.
- 1857 – Chesapeake Female College was built.
- 1860
  - Town incorporation repealed again.
  - Population expanded up to 1,848.
- 1861 – August: Residents set fire to town in order to repel Union forces during the American Civil War.
- 1865 – February 3: U.S.- Confederate Hampton Roads Conference held aboard the steamboat River Queen to discuss terms to end the American Civil War.
- 1868 – Hampton Agricultural and Industrial Institute and its museum were established.
- 1870 – National Home for Disabled Volunteer Soldiers Southern Branch began operating.
- 1871 – Hampton Institute Press was founded.
- 1872 – Hampton Institute's Southern Workman journal began publication.
- 1875 – Booker T. Washington graduated from Hampton Institute.
- 1876
  - Hampton Monitor newspaper began publication.
  - County courthouse was built.
- 1878 – Little England Chapel was built.
- 1882 – Railroad began operating.
- 1884
  - Fire.
  - Bulletin newspaper began publication.
- 1887 – Town incorporated again once more.
- 1889
  - Citizens Railway (trolley) began operating.
  - People's Building and Loan Association in business.
- 1890 – Population increased up to 2,513.
- 1891 – Dixie Hospital nursing school was established.
- 1897 – Annual Hampton Negro Conference was held at the Hampton Institute.
- 1900 – Population increased up to 2,764.

== 20th century ==
- 1903 – Hampton Institute's Huntington Memorial Library was built.
- 1908
  - March 4: City of Hampton was incorporated.
  - B’nai Israel synagogue was built.
- 1912 – American Theatre was built.
- 1915 – Apollo Theatre in business.
- 1916 – Braddock monument was erected.
- 1917 – U.S. military Langley Field (airfield) and its Langley Memorial Aeronautical Laboratory (later NASA Langley Research Center) began operating.
- 1920
  - Scott Theatre was opened.
  - Population grew up to 6,138.
- 1922 – February 21: U.S. military airship Roma exploded during test flight.
- 1926 – Taylor Memorial Library was opened.
- 1928 – Chamberlin Hotel was built.
- 1930 – "Hampton Veterans' Facility" began operating.
- 1937 – Aberdeen Gardens (housing) was built by U.S. Interior Department's Subsistence Homesteads Division.
- 1939 – Hampton City Hall was built.
- 1943 – U.S. Langley Research Center's racially segregated West Area Computers began operating.
- 1948
  - WVEC radio began broadcasting.
  - Green Acres Auto Theatre (drove-in cinema) in business.
- 1950 – Population expanded up to 5,966.
- 1952
  - July 1: Elizabeth City County (including Phoebus) was consolidated into city of Hampton.
  - Fort Wool historic site was established.
- 1954 – October: Hurricane Hazel occurred.
- 1957 – Hampton Roads Bridge–Tunnel to Norfolk was opened.
- 1960
  - Interstate 64 highway construction was completed.
  - Population increased up to 89,258.
- 1962
  - Kecoughtan High School was founded.
- 1964 – WHOV radio began broadcasting.
- 1968
  - Thomas Nelson Community College was founded.
  - Bethel High School was built.
- 1970 – Hampton Coliseum was opened.
- 1973 – Coliseum Mall in business.
- 1979 – September: Hurricane David occurred.
- 1982 – Finite element machine was invented at NASA Langley Research Center (approximate date).
- 1984 – Hampton University became active.
- 1987 – Hampton Public Library new building was opened.
- 1992 – Virginia Air and Space Center was established.
- 1993 – Bobby Scott became U.S. representative for Virginia's 3rd congressional district.
- 1994 – Hampton Roads Voice newspaper began publication.
- 1996
  - July: Hurricane Bertha (1996) occurred.
  - City website started operating online (approximate date).

== 21st century ==
- 2003 – Hampton History Museum was opened.
- 2008 – Molly Joseph Ward became mayor.
- 2010
  - U.S. military Joint Base Langley–Eustis started its operation near city.
  - Population rose up to 137,436.
- 2011
  - Fort Monroe was decommissioned by the U.S. military
- 2016
  - Donnie Tuck became mayor.
  - Hidden Figures movie was released, partially set in Hampton.

== See also ==
- Hampton history
- List of mayors of Hampton, Virginia
- National Register of Historic Places listings in Hampton, Virginia
- History of Hampton Roads area
- Timelines of other cities in Virginia: Alexandria, Lynchburg, Newport News, Norfolk, Portsmouth, Richmond, Roanoke, Virginia Beach

== Bibliography ==
- Richard Edwards, ed. (1855), "Hampton", Statistical Gazetteer of the State of Virginia, Richmond
- J.H. Chataigne, ed. (1882). "Elizabeth City County". Chesapeake & Ohio Railway Directory. Richmond. (Includes information about Hampton)
- Thomas Whitehead; Virginia State Board of Agriculture (1893). "Elizabeth City". Virginia: a Hand-Book. Richmond. (Includes information about Hampton)
- Ordinances of the Town of Hampton, Virginia, 1897
- Newport News, Hampton, Phoebus and Old Point, Va. Directory: 1910, Richmond: Hill Directory Company, 1909
  - 1917 ed.
- "Hampton (Virginia)" . Encyclopædia Britannica. Vol. 12 (11th ed.). 1910. p. 906.
- Lyon G. Tyler (1922). History of Hampton and Elizabeth City County, Virginia. Board of Supervisors of Elizabeth City County.
- Gillie Cary McCabe (1929). Story of an Old Town: Hampton, Virginia. Richmond, Va.: Old Dominion Press.
- Federal Writers' Project (1941), "Hampton", Virginia: a Guide to the Old Dominion, American Guide Series, Oxford University Press, pp. 227+
- Parke Rouse Jr. (1986). Good Old Days in Hampton and Newport News. Richmond: Dietz Press. OCLC 13983158.
- Colita Nichols Fairfax (2005). Hampton, Virginia. Black America. Charleston, South Carolina: Arcadia.
- Paul T. Hellmann (2006). "Virginia: Hampton". Historical Gazetteer of the United States. Taylor & Francis. ISBN 1-135-94859-3.
