= Hampton High School (Virginia) =

Location
- 1491 West Queen Street; Hampton, Virginia 23669; United States; 37°01′26″N 76°22′56″W

Information
- School type: Public high school
- Founded: 1875
- School district: Hampton City Schools
- Superintendent: Dr. Raymond Haynes
- Principal: Haneef Majied
- Staff: 106.44 (FTE)
- Grades: 9-12
- Enrollment: 1,501 (2017-18)
- Student to teacher ratio: 14.10
- Language: English
- Campus: Suburban
- Colors: red Red and White
- Mascot: Crabbers
- Website: http://hhs.sbo.hampton.k12.va.us/

Hampton High School is a public secondary school in Hampton, Virginia. It is the oldest of the four current high schools in Hampton Public Schools, built in 1956. It is an International Baccalaureate World School with the Diploma Programme. Hampton High is the first high school in the Hampton city high school division.

== History ==
Hampton High School traces its roots to the first free school founded in the American Colonies, the Syms-Eaton Academy, which opened on February 12, 1634, as the Syms Free School. Syms is the oldest free school and the first endowed educational institution in the United States. In 1634 Benjamin Syms left 200 acres (0.81 km^{2}) and eight cows to provide a free school for children of the parish.

In 1659 Thomas Eaton, a 'cururgeon' (surgeon), left 500 acres (2.0 km^{2}), buildings, livestock, and two slaves for a school to serve Elizabeth City County. The schools were so popular that in 1759 an act was necessary to provide for the attendance of only poor children at Eaton School.

In 1805 the schools were merged by act of the General Assembly and called Hampton Academy, which in 1852 became part of the public school system. Its building was burned in 1861 and rebuilt after the war, taking the official name of Hampton High. The first graduating class was in 1896, consisting of two students: Miss Bessie Birdsall and Miss Blance Bullifant.

From the early 20th century, Hampton High was ranked in the top ten of schools in Virginia, and the West Point Military Academy acknowledged that it accepted Hampton graduates without requiring them to take the West Point entrance exam. The current building for Hampton High dates to 1956; due to the layout of the building, it earned the nickname "Little Pentagon" because of its "seemingly endless hallways."

The school was featured in national news in the summer of 1995 for the celebration of the centennial graduating class (1996). There is a section of seating at football games for the alumni who are in their 70s and 80s.

== Accreditation and rankings ==
Hampton High School is fully accredited by the Virginia Department of Education based on its performance on the Virginia SOL Tests. It was included in Newsweek magazine's "Top 1200" high schools in 2008 and 2009 and the "Top 1600" (top 6%) in 2010.

In March 2019, for the first time in Hampton's history, the Band and Chorus earned Superior ratings at State Assessments, establishing Hampton High School as Blue Ribbon School, which is the highest musical honor a Band and Choral program can receive.

== Demographics ==
In the 2005-2006 school year, Hampton was 81% Black; 14% White; 3% Hispanic; and 2% Asian. In the 2025-2026 school year, Hampton was 91% Black; 4% White; 3% Asian; and 2% Hispanic

== Athletics and extracurricular ==
The school's official mascot is a crab, and athletic teams are referred to as the "Crabbers." Occasionally, Freddie the Crab can be found on the sidelines at football games. The Crabbers compete in Group AAA, the largest group in the state, Peninsula District and Eastern Region of the Virginia High School League.

=== Football ===
In the 1980s the Crabbers appeared in the state championship game 8 times in 10 years, winning 5. 1980, 1981, 1984, 1985, 1986, 1987, 1988, & 1990. The Crabbers have the Peninsula District/Eastern Region/State Record for most consecutive wins. Their most recent title was in 2005. The Crabbers have won 18 state titles the first in 1912 and two National High School titles 1996 and 1997. Hampton High School is ranked the #10 dynasty in the country in the history of football, 836 wins.

=== Basketball ===
Hampton is also known for its basketball teams. The girls' team is a perennial contender in the district, winning the district title more often than not in the last decade, including all of the last seven. The Lady Crabbers are the 2006-07 Eastern Region Champions and the VHSL Group AAA State Champions. The Hampton High boys' team finished first in the district in the 2011-2012 season going on to win the AAA state championship. In 2023, the Lady Crabbers won the Virginia State Championship in girls' basketball.

=== Scholastic Bowl ===
The 2006-07 season marked Hampton's first trip to the VHSL Eastern Region Scholastic Bowl. After finishing second in the PD Regular Season and Tournament, the Crabbers advanced to the regional meet and placed third, losing to frequent regional-champion Princess Anne High School by a mere 15 points — one question away from qualifying for the VHSL State meet.

=== Drama club ===
In 2011, the Hampton High School Drama Club competed in the District One Act Play competition, where they were second only to Menchville. They then went on the Regional level and took sixth place.

=== Concert and marching bands ===
In 2010-2011, the Hampton High School Band earned their first VBODA Virginia honor band title, which is the highest award any school in the state of Virginia can earn. In 2012 the Hampton High School band earned the title of Virginia Honor Band for the second year in a row, becoming the second school in Hampton to earn the title twice. In 2010 the band, for the first time in school history, attended State Marching Band Assessment. The bands earned superior ratings in their first attempt at assessment. In the spring, the concert bands performed grade 2 and grade 4 literature at State Concert Assessment and earned unanimous superior ratings.

In 2011, the marching bands earned 16 high awards and the Grand Championship award at the first annual Warhill Classic. In 2012, the Crabber Band earned 29 first place awards and the second place "Grand Champion" at the Warhill Classic, while going undefeated in class throughout the season. The Crabber marching band at the Hanover Hawk Invitational competed in the "AAA" class and earned Grand Champion, competing against 24 bands across the Commonwealth ranging from members 40-180. In spring 2012, the Symphonic Band earned straight superior ratings at State Concert Assessment in all categories from all four judges for the second year in a row. The band traveled to the Kings Dominion Festival of Music concert band competition and earned "Best High School Band" and "Grand Champion."

In 2012 The Crabbers once again continued their success in competitive marching band, earning over 26 first place awards, two grand championships and superior ratings with the concert groups at State Concert Assessment. Hampton hosted VBODA District 8 Concert Assessment. Hampton was only one of seven groups to earn superior ratings and only one of two schools (Grafton HS and Hampton HS) to have all performing groups earn unanimous superiors.

In 2013, the Crabbers earned VBODA Virginia Honor Band again. Both of the concert bands earned Superior Ratings in grade 4/5 and 3 music respectively. The marching band earned a combined score of 98 at State Marching Assessment, as well as all "A"s in all captions. The Percussion section went undefeated for the second year in a row in class. The bands earned Grand Championships at the Menchville Monarch Competition, the Hermitage Classic, and the Hanover Hawks Marching Invitational. This is in addition to winning their class at every competition in the 2013 season. The Band also participated in a concert band clinic at the University of Virginia, before the State Concert Assessment.

For four consecutive years, from 2010 to 2013, the Pride of the Peninsula has been the highest scoring band out of the City of Hampton at the annual Holiday Parade.

From 2010 to 2014 the bands were under the instruction of Justin Ratcliff. From 2014 to 2016 the bands were under the direction of Steven Kunka. The bands are currently under the direction of Ronzel Bell.

=== State championships ===
Hampton has won 36 state championships, which are:

- 2 High School Football National Championships (1996, 1997)
- 17 in football {10 in AAA (1936, 1942, 1948, 1950, 1969, 1975, 1977, 1980, 1981, 1985); two in AAA Division 6 (1986, 1988); five in AAA Division 5 (1995–1998, 2005)}
- 7 in boys' outdoor track (six in the now defunct Division B in 1926-30 and 1932; one in IA in 1961)
- 5 in boys' basketball (one in the now defunct Division I in 1939; one in the now defunct IA division in 1969; two in AAA in 1989 and 1997 and also one in 2012)
- 3 in AAA boys' cross country (1957, 1962, 1967)
- 3 in AAA girls' basketball (2001, 2007, 2023)

== Notable alumni ==
- Robert Arthur Jr., author, creator of The Three Investigators and contributor to several Alfred Hitchcock anthologies
- Robert Banks, former NFL linebacker/defensive end
- Cat Barber, professional basketball player
- Elton Brown, former NFL offensive lineman of the Arizona Cardinals
- Aijalon Cordoza, politician
- Ronald Curry, NFL wide receiver and receiver coach of the New Orleans Saints
- Chris Finwood, college baseball coach
- Marques Hagans, former National Football League quarterback/receiver with the Washington Redskins
- Chris Hanburger, nine-time pro bowl linebacker for the Washington Redskins, elected to the Pro Football Hall of Fame in 2011
- Cheryl Holcomb-McCoy, dean of American University School of Education
- Michael Husted, NFL kicker who played nine seasons in the NFL with the Tampa Bay Buccaneers and other teams
- John P. Jumper, retired 4-star General, former Chief of Staff of the US Air Force (1962)
- Petra Kelly, founder of the German Green Party
- Christopher C. Kraft Jr., retired NASA engineer and manager
- Darren W. McDew, 4-star General, United States Air Force
- Felonious Munk (as Dennis Banks), comedian known for The Nightly Show with Larry Wilmore on Comedy Central
- Robin Olds, triple ace and retired brigadier general in the United States Air Force
- Steve Riddick, 1976 Olympic Gold Medalist, Fastest Man in the World
- Tabitha Soren (Tabitha Sornberger), reporter for MTV News
- Dwight Stephenson, former NFL center for the Miami Dolphins and a member of the Pro Football Hall of Fame
- Tyrod Taylor, quarterback with the New York Giants
- Jill S. Tietjen (born 1954), electrical engineer and consultant
- Al Vandeweghe (1920–2014), professional football player for the All-America Football Conference's Buffalo Bisons in 1946
- David Watford, NFL wide receiver
- Lew Worsham (1917–1990), professional golfer
