= Blackbeard's Point =

Location in Virginia, United States

Blackbeard's Point is an area of land on the north side of the mouth of the Hampton River in Hampton Roads harbor in Virginia. It received its name in the early 18th century, when the pirate Blackbeard was menacing shipping on the American coast. When approached by North Carolina merchants seeking help in breaking up piracy along the Outer Banks, Virginia Lieutenant Governor Alexander Spotswood sent the Royal Navy, under the command of Lieutenant Robert Maynard, to capture Blackbeard. After the pirate was killed in a battle off the coast of North Carolina on November 22, 1718, Lieutenant Maynard had his head removed and hung from the bowsprit of his sloop. On arrival in Virginia, the lieutenant governor had Blackbeard's head hung from a pole at the mouth of the Hampton River as a warning to others who might be tempted by piracy. The head remained for many years and the site continues to be known as Blackbeard's Point today.
