= Lynching of Joseph H. McCoy =

Black lynching victim in Alexandria, VA (1897)

Joseph H. McCoy (1878/1879 – April 23, 1897) was a Black teenager who was lynched in Alexandria, Virginia, beginning the night of April 22, 1897, by a mob who fought their way through police officers to break him out of jail. The mob then beat McCoy severely before he was hanged to death. McCoy was born and raised in Alexandria, living with extended family. He had been arrested, without a warrant, for sexually assaulting three daughters of his white employer, Richard Lacy, for whom he had worked for 16 years. McCoy denied the charges. McCoy was one of two lynching victims in Alexandria, Virginia; the second, Benjamin Thomas, was lynched two years later, in 1899.

== Personal life ==
Joseph McCoy was born in Alexandria and lived on South Alfred Street, where much of his extended family lived. He was the youngest of five children. His maternal grandmother was a freed black woman and worked as a washerwoman.

== Lynching ==
McCoy was arrested the evening of April 22. A lieutenant from the Alexandria Police Department, after meeting with Lacy, who claimed McCoy had assaulted his daughters, and a neighbor, arrested McCoy without a warrant and brought him to the station house. The lieutenant, Smith, said "I did not tell him that he was arrested until I got him here. After I informed what he was arrested for he denied it."

Around 11 pm, approximately 150 men were at the station house. Sometime before midnight they began attacking the front door with a makeshift battering ram, and were able to enter the station. Police officers fired weapons into the air and forced the crowd outside while arresting four. The police began to barricade the station and Lt. Smith asked the crowd to go home, saying "I hope and pray that each and every citizen will go home; this man will...be given a fair and impartial trial, and I hope if he is guilty, he will get his just desserts, and I am satisfied he will."

The mob attacked again at 1 AM the morning of April 23 and successfully broke through doors and windows in spite of officers firing their weapons above their heads again. Officers claimed, after the fact, that they knew none of the men and "there were a great many strangers," while a reporter for the Washington Evening Times said "many prominent citizens took part in the affair." The crowd successfully overpowered the officers and, using an ax, broke open McCoy's cell door. Around 1:20 AM, Joseph McCoy was carried out into the street by the mob to cheers from the crowd. He was hit with the ax, stabbed, shot several times, and hanged from a lamppost for approximately 15 minutes before being cut down, dead.

The coroner found that his cause of death was "strangulation" and the results of the autopsy showed that he had a "burn on his face, likely from gunpowder; an open wound above his forehead and a contusion on the back of his head; and 3 gunshot wounds to the left breast."

== Aftermath ==
On the evening of April 24, reports arrived in Alexandria that "400 to 600 Negroes were marching toward the city to avenge the lynching of McCoy". Multiple alerts were sounded overnight via bells, causing groups of up to 5,000 armed white men to form around the corner of King and Washington St. The Washington Times reported that "every man on the street is armed, some with Winchesters, and others with old Confederate muskets, pistols, and every conceivable weapon". Ultimately, the majority of the overnight alarms were false alarms, including a false report that a policeman had been killed, a fire in southern Alexandria, and various false reports that armed groups of "negros" were beginning to enter the city. During the evening, up to 400 armed men attempted to guard Lacy's house.

== Funeral ==
McCoy's family refused to pay for a funeral, instead they wanted to put the cost on the city and state, as his aunt said upon viewing the body "as the people killed him, they will have to bury him." The funeral was held April 24 and the service was performed by Rev. William H. Gaines with about 25 black attendees and the exact time was not publicized before hand. He was interred at the Penny Hill Cemetery in the city.

== Legacy ==
The city of Alexandria, Virginia, began hosting remembrances of McCoy and his lynching in 2020 on its anniversary. In 2021, the city installed a historic marker at the site of the lynching, the corner of Lee and Cameron Streets in Old Town. In 2022, the Black community and the city collected soil as a memorial from locations close to McCoy's life to transport to the Equal Justice Initiative in Montgomery, Alabama.
