= Syms-Eaton Academy =

Defunct public school in Virginia, USA

Coordinates: 37°1.572′N 76°20.492′W

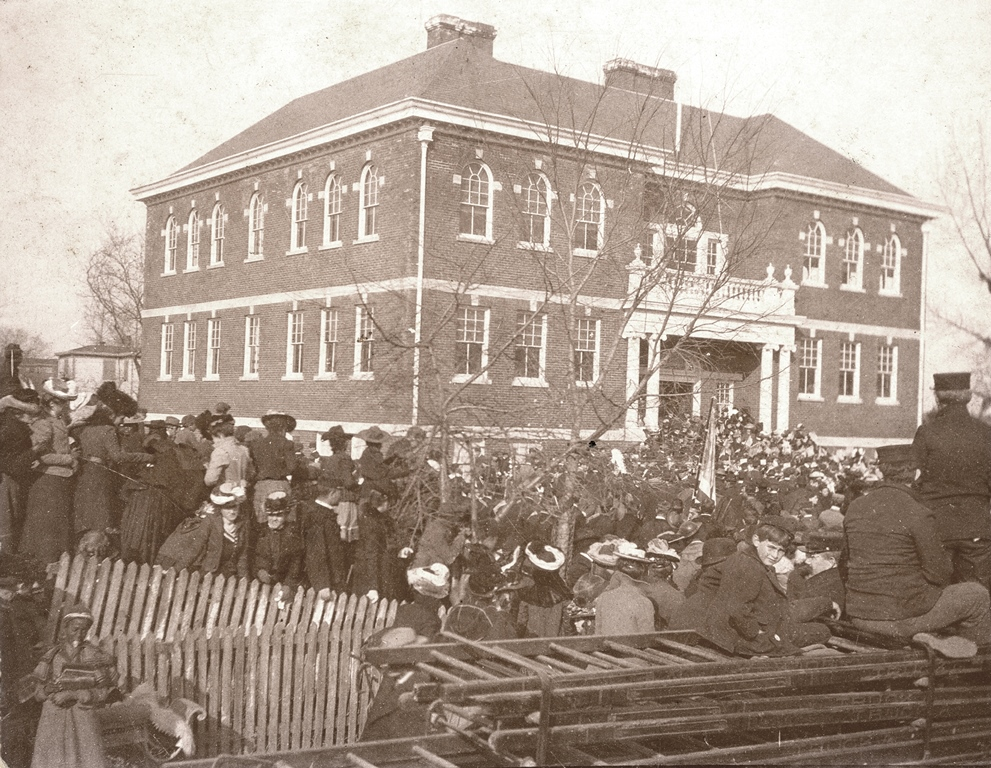
Reopening of the Syms-Eaton Academy school building in 1902

The Syms-Eaton Academy, also known as Syms-Eaton Free School, was a series of schools first established in Hampton, Virginia in 1634 as colonial America's first free public school. Colonists Benjamin Syms and Thomas Eaton both donated resources to provide education for the poor, and the schools they created later combined to become the Syms-Eaton Academy. The academy was eventually succeeded by Hampton High School and the academy's funding incorporated into the city's school system.

== History ==
The first free school was the Syms School, established through the donation of 200 acres (0.81 km^{2}) of land and eight cows for "a free school to educate and teach the children of the adjoining parishes of Elizabeth City and Poquoson from Marie's Mount downward to the Poquoson River", by Benjamin Syms on February 12, 1634. Twenty-five years later, in 1659, Thomas Eaton donated 500 acres (2.0 km^{2}), buildings, livestock, and two slaves for the Eaton Charity School to serve the poor of Elizabeth City County. The two schools were so popular that in 1759 a statute was passed to provide for the attendance of only poor children at Eaton School.

Citing years of disrepair, the schools were merged by act of the Virginia General Assembly in 1805 and renamed Hampton Academy. When the Virginia legislature authorized statewide free state schools in 1851, Hampton Academy become part of the new system. The remaining money in the trust fund established by the Syms and Eaton 17th century donations were conveyed to the Hampton public school system.

Confederate forces burned the school along with the rest of Hampton during the Civil War, in order to avoid the city and Fort Monroe being used by the Union army. However, Hampton Academy was rebuilt and reopened in 1870 after the war. In 1902, the school was again rebuilt and renamed Syms-Eaton Academy, before eventually being incorporated as part of Hampton High School.

== Successor schools ==
A number of schools are successors in name or location, including:

- Syms Middle School, a middle school feeding Kecoughtan High School, Hampton, Virginia
- Eaton School, a middle school feeding Phoebus High School, Hampton, Virginia
- Syms-Eaton Elementary School, a former school, now a pavilion in downtown Hampton, Virginia
- Hampton High School (Hampton, Virginia), is a public secondary school that is arguably a successor to the Syms-Eaton Academy
- Eaton Fundamental Middle School, a feeder to Bethel High School (Hampton, Virginia)
