= Lynching of Benjamin Thomas =

Black lynching victim in Alexandria, VA (1899)

Benjamin Thomas
- Born: 1883/1884; Alexandria, Virginia, U.S.
- Died: August 8, 1899; Alexandria, Virginia, U.S.
- Cause of death: Lynching by hanging
- Known for: Lynching victim in Alexandria, Virginia

Benjamin Thomas (1883/1884 – August 8, 1899) was a 16-year-old Black teenager who was lynched in Alexandria, Virginia on August 8, 1899. He had been arrested the day before and put into jail before a mob broke into the jail, dragging him outside, before beating him and ultimately he was hanged to death. He was the second of two reported lynching victims in Alexandria; the first, almost two years earlier, was Joseph H. McCoy.

== Lynching ==
Benjamin Thomas was arrested on August 7, 1899, accused of assaulting the 8-year-old daughter of a white neighbor. Thomas claimed his innocence. The evening of the next day, August 8, beginning around 10 PM a mob of hundreds of white residents surrounded the jail where was being held and demanded he be released to them. Around midnight they were able to break into the jail and forceably remove Thomas. He was then beaten, had a noose placed around his neck, and dragged approximately half a mile around the city. He was then lynched, hanged to death, at the corner of King and Fairfax streets.

== Legacy ==
Beginning in 2020, the city of Alexandria has begun honoring Benjamin Thomas on the anniversary of his lynching. In 2022, the city held a ceremony involving soil collected from locations connected to Thomas's life to transport to the Equal Justice Initiative in Montgomery, Alabama.
