= Timeline of Roanoke, Virginia =

Timeline of the history of Roanoke, Virginia

The following is a timeline of the history of the city of Roanoke, Virginia, United States.

== Prior to 20th century ==
- 1835 - Town of Gainesborough incorporated.
- 1838 - Roanoke County created.
- 1852 - Big Lick Depot built near Gainesborough; Virginia & Tennessee Railroad begins operating.
- 1865 - April: Big Lick settlement sacked by Federal forces during American Civil War.
- 1870 - Atlantic, Mississippi & Ohio Railroad begins operating.
- 1874
  - Town of Big Lick incorporated.
  - John Trout becomes mayor.
- 1878 - Big Lick News begins publication.
- 1882
  - Big Lick and Old Lick renamed "Roanoke".
  - Roanoke Machine Works in business.
  - Population: 5,276.
- 1883 - YMCA branch founded.
- 1884 - City of Roanoke incorporated.
- 1885 - Municipal market established.
- 1886 - Roanoke Daily Times newspaper begins publication.
- 1889 - Evening World newspaper begins publication.
- 1890
  - Roanoke Hospital founded.
  - Population: 16,159.
- 1891 - Roanoke Weekly Press newspaper begins publication.
- 1893 - September 20: "Lynch riot" occurs.

== 20th century ==
- 1902 - Beth Israel congregation formed.
- 1903 - Agricultural "Great Roanoke Fair" begins.
- 1904 - Chamber of Commerce founded.
- 1906 - Virginian Railway begins operating.
- 1910
  - City Health Department established.
  - Mill Mountain Incline (funicular) begins operating.
  - Population: 34,874.
- 1911 - Roanoke Theatre in business.
- 1913 - Bijou Theatre in business.
- 1914 - YWCA branch founded.
- 1919 - "Juvenile and Domestic Relations Court" established.
- 1920 - Population: 50,842.
- 1921
  - Public Library opens.
  - Ku Klux Klan branch active (approximate date).
- 1924 - WDBJ radio begins broadcasting.
- 1925 - Patrick Henry Hotel in business.
- 1926 - Memorial Bridge opens.
- 1930 - Big Lick Garden Club formed.
- 1933 - Roanoke Municipal Airport begins operating.
- 1936 - First Dr. Pepper plant east of the Mississippi River opened by John William "Bill" Davis; Roanoke soon becomes the Dr. Pepper Capitol of the World
- 1939 - Roanoke Tribune newspaper begins publication.
- 1950 - Population: 91,921.
- 1952
  - WSLS-TV (television) begins broadcasting.
  - Mill Mountain Zoo established.
- 1955 - WDBJ-TV (television) begins broadcasting.
- 1957 - Roanoke Historical Society founded.
- 1959 - Temple Emanuel Synagogue built.
- 1966 - Virginia Western Community College established.
- 1976 - Portion of Roanoke County becomes part of city.
- 1980 - Population: 100,220.
- 1985 - Valley View Mall in business.
- 1992 - David A. Bowers becomes mayor.
- 1993 - Bob Goodlatte becomes U.S. representative for Virginia's 6th congressional district.
- 2000 - City website online (approximate date).

== 21st century ==
- 2004 - O. Winston Link Museum opens.
- 2010 - Population: 97,032.
- 2016
  - October 25: FreightCar America shooting occurs.
  - Sherman P. Lea becomes mayor.
- 2020 - The Norfolk Southern locomotive shops cease production in Roanoke after 139 years of operations.

== See also ==
- Roanoke, Virginia history
- List of mayors of Roanoke, Virginia
- National Register of Historic Places listings in Roanoke, Virginia
- Timelines of other cities in Virginia: Alexandria, Hampton, Lynchburg, Newport News, Norfolk, Portsmouth, Richmond, Virginia Beach

== Bibliography ==
- Richard Edwards, ed. (1855), "Big Lick", Statistical Gazetteer of the State of Virginia, Richmond
- F.P. Smith (1891). Synopsis of Roanoke and Her Wonderful Prosperity. W. M. Yager and Co., Real Estate Brokers.
- "Reports of the City of Roanoke, Virginia", Department reports of the City of Roanoke1893 circa 1893-
- Picturesque Roanoke. The Stone Printing and Manufacturing Company. 1902.
- "Roanoke", Encyclopædia Britannica (11th ed.), New York, 1910, OCLC 14782424
- George S. Jack; E.B. Jacobs (1912). History of Roanoke County; History of Roanoke City. Stone.
- Frank William Hoffer (1928), Public and Private Welfare, Roanoke, Virginia, Roanoke City Planning and Zoning Commissions (Fulltext)
- Federal Writers' Project (1941), "Roanoke", Virginia: a Guide to the Old Dominion, American Guide Series, Oxford University Press, pp. 301–306, ISBN 978-0-403-02195-6 – via Google Books
- Journal of the Roanoke Historical Society, ISSN 0278-2936 circa 1964-
- Ory Mazar Nergal, ed. (1980), "Roanoke, VA", Encyclopedia of American Cities, New York: E.P. Dutton, OL 4120668M
- Mary Bishop (January 29, 1995), "Street by Street, Block by Block: How Urban Renewal Uprooted Black Roanoke", Roanoke Times – via Roanoke Public Libraries (Fulltext)
- Paul T. Hellmann (2006). "Virginia: Roanoke". Historical Gazetteer of the United States. Taylor & Francis. ISBN 1-135-94859-3.
- Rand Dotson (2008). Roanoke, Virginia, 1882-1912: Magic City of the New South. University of Tennessee Press. ISBN 978-1-57233-643-8.
