= Timeline of Richmond, Virginia =

The following is a timeline of the history of the city of Richmond, Virginia, United States

== Pre-European Era ==
- Prior to the arrival of Europeans, the Great Indian Warpath had a branch that led from present-day Lynchburg to present-day Richmond.
- By 1607, Chief Powhatan had inherited about 4–6 tribes from his mother, with its base at the Fall Line near present-day Richmond and with political domain over much of eastern Tidewater Virginia, an area known to the Powhatan as "Tsenacommacah."

== 17th century ==
=== 1600s-1610s ===
- 1607 (May) – Capt. Christopher Newport leads a party of Englishmen on an exploration and they first visit "Pawatah", one of the capitals of the Powhatan Confederacy, at Shockoe hill overlooking the falls.
- 1608 (September) – Newport returns to the falls with 120 soldiers, to explore the Monacan country upriver.
- 1609 (September) – Captain John Smith, now President of Virginia Colony, sends another force of 120 men under Francis West to settle "West's Fort" in what is now the Rockett's neighborhood; Smith then purchases the Powhatan village from the chief Parahunt and renames it "Nonsuch", however, the native inhabitants resist the settlers, forcing them to return to Jamestown.
- 1610–1614 – First Anglo-Powhatan War resulting in a seven-year "Peace of Pocahontas" between the English and the Powhatan confederacy.
- 1610 (Fall) – Lord De La Warr, brother of Francis West and now colony governor, makes another attempt to establish a fort at the falls, but it too is abandoned in early 1611. He ultimately established West and Sherley Hundred in 1613.
- 1611 – The English establish Henricus a few miles downstream and make no further attempt to occupy the falls of the James for the time being.
- 1612 – Sir Thomas Dale and 350 others move to the upper James with intent on developing a settlement outside Jamestown.
- 1613 – Sir Thomas Dale establishes Charles City Point at the confluence of the Appomattox and James rivers and remarks how this area (Bermuda Hundred) resembles the newly settled Virginia colony of Bermuda.
- 1614 – On April 5, John Rolfe marries Pocahontas and they move to Varina Farms (across the James River from Henricus). For the next two years, they develop Nicotiana tabacum tobacco as a viable cash crop. Their son Thomas Rolfe is born here in 1615.
- 1617 – Rector and charter colonist of Henricus Alexander Whitaker drowns in the James River.
- 1619
  - Falling Creek Ironworks is built at confluence of Falling Creek with the James River.
  - Thomas Dowse and John Polentine represent Henrico Cittie in the first meeting of the House of Burgesses at Jamestown
  - After 38 settlers arrive safely at Berkeley Hundred, Thanksgiving is celebrated Berkeley Plantation on December 4.
  - Samuel Jordan settles at Jordan's Journey (Jordan Point).

=== 1620s-1640s ===
- March 1622 – Henricus abandoned after Indian massacre of 1622
- From 1622 to 1632 the Second Anglo-Powhatan War made living away from Jamestown treacherous for colonial settlers. Attempts to continue settlement at Henricus continued, but only 22 inhabitants and 10 "dwelling houses" were there in May 1625.
- 1634 – The Virginia shire system is established, with most of Central Virginia included in Henrico Shire. with the county seat at Varina
- 1635 – Captain Thomas Harris plants a tobacco farm at Curles Neck
- 1636 – Fur trader Captain Henry Fleet drove the Appomattoc away from the falls of the Appomattox River, built a fort, and thereby opened that area for settlement.
- 1637 – William Farrar finally receives patent for the 2,000-acre tract around Henricus that he had abandoned in 1622. This ownership bestowed the family name to Farrar's Island.
- 1644–1645 – Third Anglo-Powhatan War
- 1645 – To secure the border between the English and the Native Americans, the English built Fort Charles built at falls of the James and Fort Henry (commanded by Abraham Wood) at the falls of the Appomattox River.
- 1646
  - Opchanacanough dies, and leaves Necotowance as the Weroance (chief) of the Pamunkey tribe.
  - Peace Treaty of 1646 ends Anglo-Powhatan War by giving English control of territory as far west as Mowhemencho (now Bernard's Creek on the James in Powhatan County, Virginia), as well as granted an exclusive enclave between the York and Blackwater Rivers. This physically separated the Nansemonds, Weyanokes and Appomattox, who retreated southward, from the other Powhatan tribes then occupying the Middle Peninsula and Northern Neck, and effectively ends the Powhatan Confederacy
- 1647 – Location of Fort Charles moved across the James River to "Manastoh", now Southside Richmond.
- 1649 – Necotowance dies, leaving Totopotomoi as the chief of the Pamunkeys.

=== 1650s-1670s ===
- 1654 – New Kent County was created from York County. The county's name originated because several prominent inhabitants, including William Claiborne, recently had been forced from their settlement at Kent Island, Maryland by Lord Baltimore upon the formation of Maryland.
- 1656
  - Battle of Bloody Run -- Mahocks, Nahyssans and Rehecrechians, recently defeated by the Five Nations in the Beaver Wars, camp at what is now called Church Hill. They combat a combined force of English and Pamunkey, and the spring runs red with blood, including that of dead Pamunkey chief Totopotomoi. Cockacoeske becomes chief of the Pamunkeys.
  - Theodorick Bland of Westover acquires the previously abandoned Jordan's Journey (Jordan Point) tract.
- 1658—The first Indian reservation in the New World, the Pamunkey Indian Reservation, is established east of present-day Richmond.
- 1660 -- Theodorick Bland of Westover marries Anne Bennett, the daughter of the former Puritan governor Richard Bennett. (Bennett had been appointed colonial governor under Oliver Cromwell April 30, 1652, to March 31, 1655.)
- 1663 – Henry Randolph I builds Swift Creek Mill (widely believed to be one of the first grist mills in the United States. )
- 1670s – between May and July, John Lederer leads an expedition from Fort Charles (now Richmond) exploring the eastern slope of the Blue Ridge Mountains to the Catawba River near what is now Charlotte He returns in July to Fort Henry (now Petersburg).
- 1670s – Nathaniel Bacon arrives from England and purchases land in the frontier of Virginia: at Curles Neck Plantation
- 1673 – William Byrd I is granted lands at the falls and establishes a trading post and small settlement.
- 1675 – Wood's son-in-law, Peter Jones commands Fort Henry and opens a trading post nearby, known as Peter's Point. (~75 years later, Peter's Point would be merged with nearby Blandford and incorporated as Petersburg, Virginia)
- 1676
  - The Pamunkeys (led by Cockacoeske) and other tribes assist Nathaniel Bacon in his rebellion.
  - After Bacon's Rebellion occurs at Jamestown, William Randolph (a recent arrival from England) purchases Bacon's land and other land holdings along the James River in Henrico.
- 1677 – Charles II of England signs the Treaty of 1677, making peace with Virginia Indians, including such Richmond-area tribes as the Monicans (west of the falls) and the Appomattoc (near modern-day Tricities, Virginia).

=== 1680s-1690s ===
- 1685 – Cleric James Blair arrives from London to become the rector of Henrico Parish in Varina.
- 1688 – Protestants King William and Queen Mary II of England depose Catholic James II of England in 1688 during the Glorious Revolution and institute the Toleration Act 1688. It is not immediately clear whether this act applies in the colonies, and Virginia remains largely Anglican (free of English Dissenters).
- 1689 -- Reverend Dr. James Blair, becomes became commissary (making him the Anglican bishop's representative in America and the Virginia colony's top religious leader).
- 1691 – King and Queen County is created from New Kent County
- 1693 – Blair obtains a royal charter/Letters patent for The College of William and Mary in Virginia, and departs Varina to Middle Plantation (soon to be Williamsburg) to become president for the next 50 years.
- 1699 – The Monacan abandon their town Mowhemencho, moving to North Carolina to escape Iroquois pressure.
- 1700 – King William III orders Virginia Governor Francis Nicholson to make land grants for settling French Huguenot refugees in the recently abandoned Monacan regions (in part to be a buffer between the Indians and English). Between November 1700 and August 1701, five shiploads of French Protestants arrive in Virginia and Mannakin Town is built, now Manakin-Sabot) to include a Non-Anglican church.

== 18th century ==
=== 1700s-1740s ===
- 1702
  - King William County is created out of King and Queen County
  - First burial in Blandford Cemetery.
- 1703 – Prince George County was formed from a portion of Charles City County south of the James River. It was named in honor of Prince George of Denmark, husband of Anne, Queen of Great Britain. (Anne reigned over Great Britain starting in 1702)
- 1704 William Byrd II inherits his father's estates
- 1710 William Randolph's 2nd son Thomas begins building Tuckahoe Plantation near Manakin Town.
- 1719 – Hanover County was created on November 26, 1719, from the area of New Kent County called St. Paul's Parish.
- 1728
  - Goochland County (named after the new royal lieutenant governor Sir William Gooch is formed; this is the first county formed from Henrico Shire.
  - Caroline County was established from Essex, King and Queen, and King William counties.
- 1730 -
  - the Tobacco Inspection Act of 1730 establishes a tobacco inspection at Warwick and at "Shockoe's upon Col. Byrd's land"
  - by this year, Three Notch'd Road is widely used to connect the Richmond area to the Shenandoah Valley
  - Henry Cary builds Ampthill at Falling Creek
- 1733 – Richmond named by William Byrd II, after Richmond upon Thames, England.
- 1735
  - Amelia County was created from parts of Prince George and Brunswick counties. It was named in honor of Princess Amelia of Great Britain.
  - Blandford Church build next to Blandford Cemetery
- 1737 – Street grid laid out.
- After George Whitefield's 1739–1740 tour (particularly his 1739 sermon at Williamsburg), the First Great Awakening takes hold in Virginia.
- 1741
  - St. John's Episcopal Church built.
  - William Randolph II dies, and his son Beverley inherits the Westham Plantation.
- 1742 – Town of Richmond incorporated.
  - Louisa County was established in 1742 from Hanover County
- 1744
  - William Byrd II dies. Byrd III goes to London to study law and will not return until 1748
  - Virginia General Assembly creates Albemarle County from the western portion of Goochland County.
  - Peter Jefferson moves his family (including two-year-old Thomas Jefferson) from his Shadwell estate (in Albemarle County) to Tuckahoe Plantation in Goochland County to become guardian of dying William Randolph III's four children.
- 1748 – Samuel Davies becomes the first non-Anglican minister licensed by the Virginia Governor's Council, and ministers to several non-Anglican churches in the area including Byrd Presbyterian Church (founded 1748) in Goochland, Polegreen Church (founded 1743) in Hanover County, and Providence Presbyterian Church (founded 1747) in Louisa County).
- 1749
  - Chesterfield County is created from land carved out of Henrico County.
  - Cumberland County is created from land carved out of Goochland County.

=== 1750s-1790s ===
- 1750
  - Old Stone House built (approximate date).
  - Archibald Cary opens up the Chesterfield Forge near his family plantation at Falling Creek
  - circa 1750, Wm Byrd III builds a "small but elegant" house called Belvedere on a parcel of land that is known today as Oregon Hill.
- 1751 – After Beverley Randolph dies, his brother Peter Randolph carries through plans to sell lots and create the town of Westham, Virginia. Westham provides merchants an upriver storage alternative to Byrd III's warehouse at the falls.
- 1752
  - The county seat of Henrico County moves from Varina to the falls of the James.
  - Dinwiddie County was formed May 1, 1752, from Prince George County. The county is named for Robert Dinwiddie, Lieutenant Governor of Virginia, 1751–58.
- 1755 – On October 3, Samuel Davies and regional presbyterian leaders founded the Hanover Presbytery
- 1756–1761 – William Byrd III serves in the French and Indian War and rises to command the Virginia Regiment
- 1762 – Petersburg expands by adding a 28-acre parcel of land north of the Appomattox River (this north parcel was known in 1749 as Wittontown and in 1752 as Pocahontas). For this reason, the original area of Petersburg became known as "Old Town."
- 1765 – Peter Randolph, William Byrd III, and Thomas Jefferson form a company to build a canal around the James River.
- 1768 – William Byrd III sells off many Richmond-area lots in a land lottery in a failed bid to cover his gambling debts. (He went broke and committed suicide in 1777)
- 1775
  - Second Virginia Convention held at St. John's Episcopal Church where Patrick Henry proclaims "Give me liberty or give me death!."
  - James River bateau begin to ply the waters between Lynchburg and Richmond.
- 1777 – In May 1777, the Virginia General Assembly created Powhatan County out of land from the eastern portion of Cumberland County between the Appomattox and James rivers.
- 1780
  - Under Governor Thomas Jefferson, the Virginia capital moves to Richmond from Williamsburg to make it more secure from British attack.
  - The Richmond Baptist Church was established, now known as First Baptist Church.
- 1781
  - January 1 – 19, 1781—Turncoat Benedict Arnold sets fire to the city and area plantations during his infamous Raid of Richmond
  - On April 25, 1781, the British, under the command of MG William Phillips defeat Baron Von Steuben, Peter Muhlenberg and 1000 men at the Battle of Blandford in the Petersburg area.
  - Later on, in May, the Marquis de Lafayette defends Richmond from the British.
  - May 20, Cornwallis reached Petersburg on May 20 and begins to pursue Lafayette around Central Virginia just prior to the culminating battle in Yorktown that occurred in October 1781.
  - On June 3, 1781, Tarleton departs from his camp on the North Anna River and heads towards Charlottesville to capture the Virginia State government that was in hiding there. Yankee Jack Jouett makes his famous 40-mile ride from Cuckoo Tavern to warn the Virginia government.
- 1785
  - Virginia State Capitol building constructed.
  - Mason's Hall built.
  - One of the Midlothian's first coal mines, Black Heath opens.
- 1786 – Richmond Theatre opens.
- 1788
  - Virginia Ratifying Convention meets at Richmond's theater in Court End from June 2 through June 27 and agrees to ratify the US Constitution.
  - Amicable Society organized.
  - Legislative acts take Nottoway Parish, a district of Amelia County, and establish a new county, Nottoway County.
  - Kahal Kadosh Beth Shalome forms the first Jewish congregation in Virginia and the sixth oldest congregation in the United States. The congregation would not build a synagogue until 1822.
- 1790
  - Population: 3,761.
  - James River Company opens the first commercial canal in the United States, stretching from Richmond to Westham and paralleling the James for 7 miles (11 km).
  - Then still a politician and lawyer, future Supreme Court justice John Marshall builds a house near the new state capitol building in Court End
- 1790s – Gallego Flour Mills starts up.
- 1795 – Bushrod Washington purchased William Byrd III's former estate, Belvidere, from outgoing Governor Light-Horse Harry Lee and lives there until his appointment to the Supreme Court in 1798
- 1799 - The City of Richmond purchased two parcels of land, for the main purpose of becoming the city's municipal burying grounds. Land acquired on the northern end of Shockoe Hill was originally intended for white interments (see Shockoe Hill Cemetery and Shockoe Hill Burying Ground Historic District). Land acquired in Shockoe Valley was used to establish the Burial Ground for Negroes, for the interment of free people of color and the enslaved. It is now referred to as the Shockoe Bottom African Burial Ground.
- 1800
  - Population: 5,704
  - Gabriel's Rebellion

== 19th century ==
=== 1800s-1810s ===
- 1803 – James T. Callender drowns in the James River. The controversial Scottish-American journalist was editor of the Federalist "Richmond Recorder" newspaper and had been slated to testify in the People v. Croswell case. Callender had also reported in a series of articles that Thomas Jefferson had fathered children by his slave Sally Hemings.
- 1804
  - Thomas Ritchie bought out the Republican newspaper the Richmond Enquirer in 1804, and as editor and publisher for 41 years, made it a financial and political success. Thomas Jefferson said of the Enquirer, "I read but a single newspaper, Ritchie's Enquirer, the best that is published or ever has been published in America."
  - a turnpike from Midlothian opens (although it does not reach the falls of the James until 1807).
  - Abraham B. Venable becomes founding president of the Bank of Virginia
- 1807
  - Chief Justice of the United States John Marshall (a resident of Richmond) presides over the Burr conspiracy trial in Richmond.
  - Soldier, statesman, and Burr jury foreman Edward Carrington begins the first of his two terms (1807–1808 and 1809–1810) as mayor of Richmond.
- 1810
  - Theatre built.
  - Major John Clarke and prominent lawyer William Wirt build the Bellona Foundry near the Midlothian coal mines on the James River above the rapids. (In 1816, the Bellona Arsenal would be built here by the US Government.)
- 1811
  - Richmond Theatre fire in Court End kills many prominent citizens.
  - Virginia Governor's Mansion built.
  - One of Virginia's first charitable institutions, the Female Humane Association is founded in Richmond.
- 1812 – Lawyer and businessman John Wickham builds his house on Clay Street in the fashionable Court End neighborhood.
- 1813 – June 16, 1813–11-year Society of the Cincinnati president and former governor (1796–1799) James Wood dies in Richmond.
- 1814 – Monumental Church (designed by architect Robert Mills) built in Court End on the site of the 1811 theater fire.
- 1815
  - Richmond Enquirer newspaper begins publication.
  - Phoenix Burying Ground founded, now part of the Barton Heights Cemeteries.
- 1816
  - The "Shockoe Hill African Burying Ground" was established by the City of Richmond on Shockoe Hill at 5th and Hospital Street. It was referred to at the time as the "Burying Ground for Free People of Colour" and the "Burying Ground for Negroes" (the enslaved) on the city's 1816 plan.
  - The "Shockoe Bottom African Burial Ground" (or African Burial Ground in Shockoe Bottom) historically known as the "Burial Ground for Negroes" in Shockoe Valley (Shockoe Bottom) was closed upon the opening of the Shockoe Hill African Burying ground.
- 1818 – Dr. John Brockenbrough, Scottish-born president of the Bank of Virginia, builds a house in Court End.

=== 1820s-1830s ===
- 1820
  - Pope Pius VII establishes the Roman Catholic Diocese of Richmond on July 11, 1820.
  - With burial grounds at St. John's churchyard largely full, Shockoe Hill Cemetery was established as the first city-owned burial ground in Richmond. The first burial did not take place until 1822.
  - The 2nd Baptist Church was founded July 12,1820.
- 1823
  - State Library founded.
  - Colonization Society of Virginia formed.
- 1824
  - During the Visit of the Marquis de Lafayette to the United States, Lafayette stops in Richmond at least twice; once in October 1824 and once in January/February 1825.
  - Mary Randolph publishes The Virginia House-Wife
- 1826 – a turnpike opens between Manchester (modern day downtown Richmond) and Petersburg, Virginia
- 1828 – Virginia Randolph Cary publishes "Letters on Female Character, Addressed to a Young Lady, on the Death of Her Mother," an influential advice book.
- 1830 – Population: 6,056.
- 1831
  - Virginia Historical and Philosophical Society founded.
  - Nicholas Mills opens the 13-mile Chesterfield Railroad to carry coal from Midlothian to the falls of the James.
- 1832 – Richmond College opens.
- 1833
  - Third Baptist Church (later known as Grace Street Baptist, and now Grace Baptist Church) was organized by members of Second Baptist Church.
  - Petersburg Railroad opens, connecting Petersburg to the North Carolina border in Garysburg, North Carolina
- 1834
  - Typographical Society formed.
  - Southern Literary Messenger opens (hires Edgar Allan Poe as a staff writer in 1835)
  - The first Catholic church in Richmond, St. Peter's Church is erected.
- 1835 -- Bosher Dam built across the James River and several Lock-Keeper's Houses built as part of the continued construction of the James River and Kanawha Canal.
- 1836
  - Midlothian Coal Mining Company is organized with A. S. Wooldridge as president. Four shafts are Pump Shaft, Middle Shaft, Grove Shaft, and Wood Shaft.
  - Richmond, Fredericksburg and Potomac Railroad opens from Richmond to Hazel Run in 1836. It would not reach Fredericksburg until January 23, 1837, and reach the rest of the way to the Potomac River at Aquia Creek until September 30, 1842.
- 1837 – Tredegar Iron Works in business.
- 1838
  - Richmond and Petersburg Railroad opens.
  - The Medical Department of Hampden-Sydney College (later known as the Medical College of Virginia) is founded in Richmond. It temporarily rents out the Union Hotel

=== 1840s-1850s ===
- 1840
  - Population: 20,153.
  - 1840: the Bosher Dam opens on the James river at the site of the Fore's Fish Dam that had been built in 1823.
  - A Baptist Seminary founded in 1830 was chartered by the Virginia General Assembly as Richmond College (First degree was not conferred until 1849)
- 1841
  - After the Panic of 1837 froze the railroad construction boom, the struggling Tredegar Iron Works hires Assistant State Engineer and Virginia Board of Public Works employee Joseph R. Anderson in 1841. By 1848, Anderson would become its owner.
  - First African Baptist Church founded.
  - Richmond Library Association formed.
  - With increased German and Eastern European immigration, 100 Jews break away from the Sephardic "Kahal Kadosh Beth Shalome" synagogue to form the Ashkenazi Congregation Beth Ahabah.
- 1842
  - The City of Richmond was officially part of Henrico County until 1842, when it became a fully independent city.
  - On March 17, Charles Dickens stays at the Exchange Hotel in Richmond and met with newspaperman Thomas Ritchie, politician James Lyons, Senate of Virginia members Charles J. Faulkner, William Ballard Preston, and acting governor John Rutherfoord.
  - German immigrant William Thalhimer opens Thalhimers dry goods store.
- 1843 – Saint John's German Lutheran Evangelical Church founded.
- 1844 – Robert Lumpkin purchases what would become an infamous a slave jail in Shockoe Bottom.
- 1845
  - Second Presbyterian Church founded.
  - The Medical Department of Hampden-Sydney College (later known as Medical College of Virginia) builds its first permanent structure, the Egyptian Building in Court End.
- 1847 – On March 9, 1847, the Richmond and Danville Railroad is chartered. Andrew Talcott began construction in 1849, reached Coalfield Station in 1850, and completed work to Danville in 1856.
- 1849 – Hollywood Cemetery established.
- 1850 – Population: 27,570.
  - Shockoe Hill Burying-ground is increased by 14 acres. Five acres were added to the walled Shockoe Hill Cemetery for white interments, and 9 acres, plus the grounds of the City Hospital were added to the portion of the Burying-ground for Coloured People (a.k.a. the Shockoe Hill African Burying Ground). (Common Council Minutes 1848–1852, January 16, 1850)
- 1851
  - Monroe Park laid out.
  - James River and Kanawha Canal built.
- 1852
  - Gesangverein Virginia formed.
  - Virginia State Agricultural Society organized.
- 1853 – Richmond and York River Railroad connects to York River port of West Point, Virginia
- 1854
  - Virginia Mechanics Institute founded.
  - Woman's College opens.
  - the Southside Railroad acquires City Point Railroad and completes connections between City Point and Lynchburg
- 1856
  - Richmond and Danville Railroad in operation; Ashland, Virginia founded as a mineral springs resort along the train line.
  - Oakwood Cemetery established.
- 1858
  - Ebenezer Baptist Church, originally known as the Third African Baptist Church was founded.
  - Washington Monument unveiled on the grounds of the Virginia State Capitol.
  - Thirty-one-year-old engineer William Mahone completes the Norfolk and Petersburg Railroad, lessening Richmond and Petersburg's role in export shipping trade.

=== 1860s-1870s ===
- 1860 - Population:37,910.
- 1861
  - Richmond becomes capital of Confederate States of America.
  - Chimborazo Hospital opens.
  - Libby Prison in operation.
- 1862
  - from March to July the Peninsula Campaign brings several Civil War battles near Richmond including the Seven Days Battles, Battle of Drewry's Bluff, Battle of Hanover Court House, and the Battle of Seven Pines.
  - Virginian and former US President John Tyler dies while staying at the Exchange Hotel and is buried in Hollywood Cemetery.
- 1863 – April 2: Bread riot.
- 1864
  - May 4 – June 24, 1864 Overland Campaign
  - May Bermuda Hundred Campaign
    - Port Walthall Junction (May 6–7, 1864) destroying Port Walthall
    - Swift Creek (May 9)
    - Chester Station (May 10)
    - Proctor's Creek (May 12–16)
    - Ware Bottom Church (May 20)
  - May 31 – June 12 Battle of Cold Harbor
- 1864–1865 – Richmond-Petersburg Campaign
- 1865 -
  - April 2 – Richmond business district burned by retreating Confederate forces.
  - THE WAR ENDS Mayor Joseph Mayo surrenders to Union Army forces at Tree Hill. Richmonder and Union Spy Elizabeth Van Lew is the first to hoist the US flag in Richmond.
  - April – Francis Harrison Pierpont relocates Restored Government of Virginia to Richmond.
  - Allen & Ginter Toboacco company forms.
  - State Planters Bank Of Commerce And Trusts (later Crestar Bank) is founded in Richmond.
  - American Baptist Home Mission Societies form two schools Richmond Theological Institute and Wayland Seminary to train freed blacks. These were merged to become Virginia Union University in 1899
- 1866 – Richmond National Cemetery established.
- 1867
  - Black suffrage granted.
  - Colver Institute organized.
- 1868
  - With passage of Reconstruction Acts, Richmond becomes part of First Military District during Reconstruction Era, which would last until 1870
  - Richmonder Williams Carter Wickham (president of the war-battered Virginia Central Railroad) becomes the president of Chesapeake and Ohio in 1868, when the Virginia Central merges with the Covington and Ohio Railroad to form the C&O.
  - Virginia Methodists relocate Randolph–Macon College from Boydton, Virginia in Southside Virginia to make it closer to rail service.
- 1870
  - A tragic collapse at the Virginia State Capitol occurs as the overly large crowd seeks remove Reconstruction Era mayor George Chahoon. Sixty-two people were killed and 251 injured.
  - Mann Valentine II formulates "Valentine's Meat Juice" to cure his ailing wife and begins to market it aggressively throughout the 1870s.
  - Population:51,038.
  - First municipal election where Freedmen can vote.
- 1871 – Life Insurance Company of Virginia forms in Petersburg and eventually moves to Richmond.
- 1873
  - Lewis Ginter returns from New York after Panic of 1873 and forms the Allen & Ginter tobacco company with John Allen.
  - Richmond achieves railroad connection to the Ohio River. The final spike ceremony for the 428-mile (689 km) long C&O line from Richmond to the Ohio River was held on January 29, 1873, at Hawk's Nest railroad bridge in the New River Valley, near the town of Ansted in Fayette County, West Virginia.
- 1874
  - P.H. Mayo & Bros. open a cigarette-manufacturing tobacco company in 1874, further expanding the city's economic importance to the tobacco industry.
  - Richmond's Board of Alderman approves the construction of Chimborazo Park which is completed over the following decade.
- 1875 – The city begins to acquire land that would become Byrd Park and construct a new municipal waterworks system around it.
- 1876 P.H. Mayo & Bros. have a tobacco display in the agricultural building at the Philadelphia, Pennsylvania's Centennial Exposition, the first official World's Fair in the United States
- 1877
  - Westmoreland Club formed.
  - Algernon Sidney Buford, Thomas M. Logan, and other members of the Richmond and Danville Railroad, form the Bon Air Land and Improvement Company to create Bon Air, Virginia on a tract of land Buford had purchased 2 years earlier.
- 1879 - The Shockoe Hill African Burying Ground was closed to new burials due to overcrowded conditions.

=== 1880s-1890s ===
- 1880
  - James H. Dooley opens the Richmond and Alleghany Railroad along the route of the James River and Kanawha Canal.
  - Population: 63,600.
  - Population: 63,600.
- 1881 – C&O completes its Peninsula_Extension (Richmond's Fulton Yard and Church Hill Tunnel are part of this development). The line enables West Virginia Coal to be shipped through Richmond to Newport News shipyards. It opens just in time for the Yorktown Centennial.
- 1882
  - A New Pump-House is constructed upriver from the old one, and New Reservoir Park opens (approximate date).
  - Virginia Normal and Collegiate Institute established in Ettrick (Virginia State University)
  - The Richmond Planet newspaper was founded by 13 of Richmond's former enslaved. It was initially edited by Edmund Archer Randolph, the first African American graduate of Yale Law School.
- 1883 – Hartshorn Memorial College opens.
  - Entertainer Bill "Bojangles" Robinson begins his career as a child, performing as a "pick" in Richmond area Minstrel shows.
- 1884
  - 21-year-old John Mitchell, Jr. joins the staff of the Richmond Planet, an African-American newspaper.
  - As the first major league baseball team in the south, the Richmond Virginians form in the American Association and last one year before folding.
- 1885
  - Miller, Rhoads, & Gerhart in business.
  - The Robert E. Lee Camp, No. 1 Confederate Soldier Home opens (current site of VMFA.
  - Chiswell Langhorne (tobacco auctioneer and railroad industrialist) moves family to Richmond. Langhorne's daughter Irene, would marry illustrator Charles Dana Gibson in 1895 and become one of the first Gibson Girl models.
- 1886 – Richmond Daily Times begins publication.
- 1887
  - German-American pharmacist Conrad Frederick Sauer founds the C. F. Sauer Company.
  - Richmond Locomotive Works opens
- 1888
  - Richmond Union Passenger Railway (electric trolley) begins operating.
  - The Richmond News Leader newspaper begins publication.
- 1889
  - Four years before the 1893 World's Columbian Exposition is to open, Chicago businessman Charles F. Gunther purchases Civil-War era Libby Prison, dismantles it brick-by-brick, and reassembles it in Chicago as a war museum for Northern veterans.
  - Association for the Preservation of Virginia Antiquities founded.
- 1890
  - A statue of Robert E. Lee is unveiled on the new Monument Avenue, one of six large monuments that will eventually be built.
  - Monopolistic practices by James B. Duke force Allen & Ginter to join the American Tobacco Company trust, with Lewis Ginter joining the ATC as a board member.
  - St. Catherine's School, a girls prep school, opens.
  - Richmond Camera Club founded.
  - Population: 81,388.
- 1891
  - Rosemary Library Association chartered.
  - Evergreen Cemetery, a private African-American cemetery in the East End, is founded.
- 1892 – Randolph-Macon Academy prep school opens in Ashland
- 1894
  - The city of Richmond opens a brand new gothic-styled City Hall.
  - Confederate Soldiers and Sailors Monument unveiled.
  - After the Richmond Terminal Company went bankrupt in 1892, J. P. Morgan merged the Richmond and Danville Railroad, the Richmond and York River Railroad, and other holdings into the Southern Railway (U.S.) based in Washington, D.C..
- 1895
  - Lewis Ginter opens both the Ginter Park development and his Jefferson Hotel.
  - Intense land development of the Fan district and Museum District begins westward from the Lee Monument
- 1896 – Sons of Confederate Veterans is formed in Richmond. Confederate Museum opens in Court End.
- 1898
  - Valentine Museum opens.
  - Union Theological Seminary relocates to Richmond.
- 1899
  - William R. Trigg Shipbuilding Company opens. On October 31, President William McKinley and members of his cabinet came to Richmond to watch the launch of the USS Shubrick (TB-31) Two months later, the USS Stockton (TB-32) launches.
  - Lewis Ginter convinces Hampden–Sydney College to move its theological department from Farmville, Virginia to Ginter Park, establishing what is now the Union Presbyterian Seminary. The Training School for Lay Workers would not be established until 1914.
- 1900
  - Population: 85,050.
  - James H. Dooley, veteran of several rail mergers in the South, helps organize the Seaboard Air Line Railroad and serves as chairman of SAL's executive council.
  - Seaboard Airline constructs part of its railroad tracks on top of the Shockoe Hill African Burying Ground, immediately south of the Bacon's Quarter Branch. This track connects directly to Main St. Station.

== 20th century ==
=== 1900s-1910s ===
- 1901
  - Main Street Station completed, built by the Seaboard Air Line Railroad (SAL) and the Chesapeake and Ohio Railway (C&O).
  - C&O also completes the 3-mile long Peninsula Subdivision Trestle as an alternative route to the Church Hill Tunnel. This establishes the Triple Crossing.
  - As part of the Southern Railway expansion under Samuel Spencer, the Hull Street Station opens just south of the James River in Manchester.
  - Maggie L. Walker announces her intent to found St. Luke Penny Savings Bank through the Independent Order of St. Luke
- 1903
  - Richmond Times-Dispatch newspaper begins publication.
  - The Richmond News Leader newspaper begins publication.
  - St. Luke Penny Savings Bank chartered. (bank approved by a new agency called the Virginia Corporation Commission, and opens November 2, 1903)
  - Gilded Age hotel Hotel Richmond built overlooking the State Capitol grounds.
- 1905
  - Population 92,000
  - Cathedral of the Sacred Heart built with funds from tobacco, insurance and transportation magnate Thomas Fortune Ryan.
  - Richmond Public Library Association formed.
  - Frank Jay Gould establishes the Richmond and Chesapeake Bay Railway interurban from Richmond to Ashland
  - As part of a drinking water project, Williams Island Dam is built west of the rapids and an L-shaped annex is added to the Byrd Park Pump House
- 1906 – Chester High School (current day Thomas Dale High School) opens in Chester, Virginia
- 1908
  - Treble Clef and Book Lovers' Club formed.
  - After the Richmond Colts formed in 1894 in the Virginia League (1894–1896) and joining another Virginia League in 1900, the Richmond Colts joined a third Virginia League in 1906 and won their first league championship in 1908 under the leadership of Perry Lipe.
- 1909 – Virginia Railway & Power Company formed by Frank Jay Gould.
- 1910
  - Manchester becomes part of city through annexation.
  - Population: 127,628.
  - The estate of Times-Dispatch editor Joseph Bryan donates Bryan Park to the City of Richmond.
- 1911 – The Chamberlayne School (a boy's prep school later known as St. Christopher's School) opens.
- 1912
  - George Ainslie becomes mayor, a position he would hold for the next 12 years.
  - After the 6-cylinder Kline Kar (invented in 1910 in York, Pennsylvania) begins to win national attention for winning auto races, a group of Richmond businessmen bring the Kline Motor Car Corporation factory to Richmond in 1912. Production on the Kline Kar would continue until 1923.
- 1913
  - Charles Gillette, prominent in the field of Colonial Revival architecture, begins his Virginia landscaping career by completing Warren H. Manning's landscape design of Richmond College grounds at Westhampton.
  - Society for the Betterment of Housing and Living Conditions incorporated.
  - Confederate Memorial Institute ("Battle Abbey") built.
- 1914
  - Federal Reserve Bank of Richmond headquartered in Richmond.
  - Richmond College moves to site of former Westhampton Amusement Park; Westhampton College for women opens.
  - Barton Heights, Fairmount, and Highland Park become part of city.
  - Hippodrome Theater opens in Jackson Ward
- 1915 – Douglas Southall Freeman becomes the editor of the Richmond News Leader, a position he would hold for the next 34 years
- 1916 – John Russell Pope designs and begins building the Branch House on Monument Avenue
- 1917
  - Broad Street Station completed by John Russell Pope.
  - Richmond School of Social Economy opens.
  - Richmond Professional Institute founded
  - The US War Department establishes Camp Lee in the Tricities, Virginia area for mobilization and training of World War I soldiers
- 1919
  - John Kerr Branch's Branch House is completed.
  - Stonewall Jackson equestrian sculpture by Frederick William Sievers unveiled October 11, 1919

=== 1920s-1930s ===
- 1920
  - Population: 171,677.
  - Richmond business men organize the Richmond-New York Steamship Company to replace the fact that Virginia Navigation Company and Old Dominion Steamship Company steamships to Norfolk were discontinued.
  - Richmond authors James Branch Cabell and Ellen Glasgow begin their collaborative friendship
- 1922
  - Edgar Allan Poe Museum opens.
  - White Supremacist Earnest Sevier Cox and white musician John Powell founded the Anglo-Saxon Clubs of America in Richmond and begin to agitate for Anti-miscegenation laws and, eventually, Virginia's Racial Integrity Act of 1924.
- 1923
- Chesterfield annexes the Henricus site from Henrico County.
  - Richmond farmers form the Virginia Seed Service that would be renamed "Southern States Cooperative" in the 1930s
  - Virginia Transit Co. begins implementing buses to augment its network of trolley lines.
  - National Theater built on Broad Street downtown.
- 1924 -- John Fulmer Bright begins his 16-year stint as mayor.
- 1925
  - WRVA radio begins broadcasting.
  - Church Hill Tunnel collapses.
  - Under the leadership of its chairman John Stuart Bryan, the Richmond Public Library opens in the former home of Lewis Ginter.
  - After the death of James H. Dooley and his wife Sallie, the Maymont property passes to the city
  - Boulevard Bridge is built nearby to Maymont
  - William Byrd Hotel built across the street from the new Broad Street Station.
- 1926
  - WMBG radio begins broadcasting.
  - As part of the Windsor Farms development near Byrd Park, Agecroft Hall shipped from England and reassembled in Richmond. Other neighborhood houses built in the style of Colonial Revival architecture.
- 1927
  - Richard Evelyn Byrd Flying Field dedicated.
  - After a decade of road improvements, the Jefferson Davis Highway officially opens as a major automobile thoroughfare
  - WRNL radio begins broadcasting.
  - DuPont purchases land near Ampthill/Bellwood for a large rayon and cellophane plant known as "Spruance Plant"
  - Inter-state traffic along Jefferson Davis Highway and its James River toll bridge leads to Belt Boulevard bypass development by 1933.
  - The Italian community dedicates a statue to Christopher Columbus in Byrd Park
  - Richmond Shriners open Acca Temple Shrine near Monroe Park, also known as "The Mosque" (later changed to the Landmark Theater in the 1990s and then the Altria theater in the 2010s).
- 1928
  - After four years of planning and site selection, construction of the Virginia World War I Memorial Carillon began in Byrd Park in 1928. It was dedicated in 1932.
  - Byrd Theatre opens.
  - Loew's Theatre opens.
- 1929
  - Warwick Priory shipped from England and reassembled as Virginia House in the Windsor Farms development in Richmond.
  - Richmond builds City Stadium near Byrd Park.
  - A fifth monument, Matthew Fontaine Maury, is unveiled on Monument Avenue. The sixth monument will not take place for another 67 years.
- 1930
  - Charles M. Robinson-designed Thomas Jefferson High School opens in Richmond's western suburbs
  - After receiving $500,000 from the Dooley estate in 1925, the Richmond Public Library opens the newly built Dooley Library near Linden Row, downtown.
  - Population: 182,929.
- 1932 – Forest Hill Amusement Park (that includes carousel, roller coaster, fun house, dance hall, penny arcade, and golf course) closes dues to impacts of the Great Depression; the city would purchase the property and raze the dilapidated amusements in 1933.
- 1934
  - Tri-State Gang members (Walter Leganza, Bobby Mais, and others) terrorize Richmond by hijacking a federal reserve truck behind Broad Street Station. They were executed in Richmond in 1935. The three-state crime spree was later dramatized in the 1950 film Highway 301
  - Parker Field is built on the site of the state fairgrounds.
  - The New York Deli (founded in 1929) moves to its current location in Carytown. The Sailor sandwich would be invented there in 1943.
  - Eighteen months after it was announced, the original Lee Bridge was dedicated November 4, 1934. The issue of whether the city should charge tolls would not be settled until July 1935 when the city negotiated with Richmond Bridge Corporation and the Virginia Electric and Power Company (VEPCO) to make the bridge toll-free.
- 1935 – Gottfried Krueger Brewery sells the first canned beer on January 24, 1935
- 1936
  - Richmond National Battlefield Park established.
  - Virginia Museum of Fine Arts opens.
  - Virginius Dabney became the editor of the Richmond Times Dispatch, a position he would hold for the next 33 years.
- 1937 – The Ukrop family opens their first of many Richmond-area grocery stores
- 1938
  - Reynolds Group Holdings moves its headquarters from New York to Richmond.
  - Cary Street Park and Shop Center opens in Carytown
  - the Swift Creek Recreational Demonstration Area opens
  - Department store William B. Thalhimer became national chairman for a refugee resettlement group aligned with Groß Breesen. Thalhimer and his cousin Morton mobilize the German-Jewish community in Richmond to purchase Hyde Park Farms in Burkeville, VA and aid in the immigration of Jewish refugees to this farm
  - Estes Express Lines (founded in 1931 in Chase City) opens a branch in Richmond. It would move its headquarters here in 1946.
- 1939 – June 27 – July 2 – Richmond hosts the 30th annual conference of the National Association for the Advancement of Colored People at The Mosque, with welcome by Mayor John Fulmer Bright, Richmond NAACP President Jesse M. Tinsley, and keynote addresses by William H. Hastie and Sam Solomon. The conference also featured in-person appearance by Eleanor Roosevelt presenting the Spingarn Medal to Marian Anderson as it was broadcast over NBC and CBS stations.

=== 1940s-1950s ===
- 1940
  - US War Department re-establishes Camp Lee for the purpose of training Quartermaster soldiers for World War II.
  - Richmond, Virginia's two newspapers, the Times-Dispatch and News Leader, merged to form a quickly growing media company known as Richmond Newspapers (now Media General).
- 1941
  - Eastern Steamship Company discontinues service from Richmond
  - The US Government acquires land in the area of Bellwood and builds a large logistics supply center to at the World War II effort.
  - Robert E. Lee Camp, No. 1 Confederate Soldier Home (current site of VMFA) closes as last veteran resident dies.
  - John Malcus Ellison (the first African American president of Virginia Union University) arranges for the Belgian Building from 1939 New York World's Fair to be donated to VUU. Belgium donated it in part for racial reconciliation reasons, and in part because the tenuous political situation in Europe prevented shipment of the building back to Belgium.
- 1946
  - The Commonwealth of Virginia takes possession of the CCC-developed Swift Creek Recreational Demonstration Area and renames it Pocahontas State Park
  - WRVA begins broadcast of The Old Dominion Barn Dance, a nationally popular live country music program that continued until 1957.
- 1947 – Philanthropist Lillian Thomas Pratt donates Fabergé eggs and other Russian objects to the VMFA.
- 1948 – WTVR-TV begins broadcasting.
- 1949
  - The last of Richmond's electric trolleys are replaced by buses
  - Samuel S. Wurtzel opens his first retail electronics store ("Wards") that would grow to become Circuit City.
  - Douglas Southall Freeman steps down as editor of the Richmond News Leader.
- 1950 – Population: 230,310.
- 1952 – Wilton House Museum opens.
- 1954 – Davis v. County School Board of Prince Edward County is decided as part of the 1954 Brown v. Board of Education ruling (officially overturned racial segregation in U.S. public schools). the Davis case was the work of Richmond civil rights attorneys Oliver Hill and Spottswood William Robinson III who took on the state's law firm of Hunton & Williams, also based in Richmond.
  - Parker Field is converted for use as a baseball field, as the Richmond Virginians minor league baseball team forms in the International League and lasts for ten years.
- 1955
  - Hurricane Connie and Hurricane Diane occur.
  - Virginia War Memorial installed.
  - VMFA, under the leadership of Leslie Cheek Jr, constructs a 500-seat proscenium stage known as the "Virginia Museum Theater" to feature the arts of drama, acting, design, music, and dance alongside the static arts of the galleries.
- 1956
  - WRVA-TV (television) begins broadcasting.
  - Following the 1954 Brown v. Board of Education ruling the Byrd Organization passed the Stanley Plan to advance Massive resistance policy of segregated schools. Some of the intellectual framework for these laws was due to forceful editorials from Richmond News Leader editor James J. Kilpatrick. Effects of these policies would affect the Richmond area for years, especially in rural areas like New Kent and Prince Edward County.
  - Historic Richmond Foundation established by Elisabeth Scott Bocock.
  - Willow Lawn Shopping Center in business just outside the city limits.
- 1957 -
  - Richmond Symphony Orchestra formed.
  - Best Products opens its first of many catalog showroom retail stores
  - United Daughters of the Confederacy builds its national headquarters building beside the VMFA on the Boulevard.
- 1958 – Richmond-Petersburg Turnpike opens to include the I-95 James River Bridge.

=== 1960s-1970s ===
- 1960 – Huguenot High School opens in Chesterfield county (it would be annexed into Richmond Public Schools system in 1970)
- 1961
  - Richmond's first public television station, WCVE-TV goes on the air.
  - Richmond observes the centennial of the Civil War with various commemorations including building the modernist Centennial Dome.
- 1962
  - Eleanor P. Sheppard, who had become Richmond's first female city council member in 1954, becomes Richmond's first female mayor.
  - Azalea Mall opens on the Northside.
- 1963 – The Hand Art Center founded by Elisabeth Scott Bocock
- 1964 – Congregation Kol Emes founded.
- 1966
  - After a two-year hiatus from minor league baseball, the Richmond Braves baseball team formed and plays at Parker Field.
  - Richmond Metropolitan Authority established to build and maintain a toll expressway system for the Richmond area.
  - St. Mary's Hospital opens in Richmond's West End
- 1967 – John Tyler Community College established in Chester.
- 1968
  - The Virginia General Assembly merged Medical College of Virginia with the Richmond Professional Institute to create Virginia Commonwealth University.
  - Laurel Street Methodist Church in Oregon Hill was burned down by an arson fire.
- 1969
  - Richmond Fairgrounds Raceway in business.
  - Virginius Dabney steps down from the Richmond Times Dispatch
- 1970
  - Portion of Chesterfield County becomes part of Richmond.
  - Science Museum of Virginia established.
- 1971
  - Richmond Coliseum opens
  - Richmond begins hosting the annual Richmond WCT, a stop on the World Championship Tennis circuit.
  - After Judge Robert R. Merhige, Jr.'s ruling in Bradley v. Richmond School Board, Richmond Public Schools were forced to institute Desegregation busing, leading to long rides and accelerated white flight to the counties.
- 1972
  - June – Hurricane Agnes leads to widespread flooding in Central Virginia, including Richmond's Shockoe Bottom / Main Street Station and the Fulton Hill slum
  - The City of Richmond forms the James River Park System
  - Cloverleaf Mall opens at the intersection of Midlothian Turnpike and Chippenham Parkway
  - After four years of planning, the dams for creating Lake Anna begin to fill (VEPCO's North Anna Nuclear Generating Station would not come online until 1978.)
- 1973
  - The 3.4 Powhite Parkway was completed from Downtown Richmond (Carytown) to Chippenham Parkway. Planning for the 10-mile Powhite Parkway Extension through Bon Air began, but would not extend to I-288 near Brandermill until 1988.
  - Phillip Morris opens a state-of-the-art cigarette manufacturing facility on Commerce Road
  - Chesterfield County Airport opens
  - the first of three campuses of J. Sargeant Reynolds Community College opens.
- 1975
  - Federal Reserve Bank of Richmond built.
  - Regency Square shopping mall opens.
  - King's Dominion opens in Doswell on May 3, 1975
  - the planned community of Brandermill, Virginia in suburban Chesterfield begins construction
  - The Chesterfield Mall opens at the corner of Midlothian and Huguenot in Chesterfield County.
  - Amtrak creates Staples Mill Station in the suburbs to replace Main Street Station
  - Six years after coining Virginia is for Lovers, Ad-man David N. Martin creates The Martin Agency
- 1976 – Virginia State Route 195 (Downtown Expressway) opens.
- 1977
  - Henry L. Marsh becomes Richmond's first African-American mayor.
  - Theatre IV (children's theater) active.
  - Richmond Children's Museum organized.
- 1978 – Richmond Marathon established by the Richmond Times Dispatch
- 1979
  - Richmond Jewish Foundation established.
  - The Briley Brothers embark on a seven-month serial-killing spree, terrorizing Richmond

=== 1980s-1990s ===
- 1980 – CSX Corporation forms as a merger of Chessie System and Seaboard Coast Line Industries. With its headquarters in Richmond, CSX begins merging various railroads into CSX Transportation.
- 1981 – James Monroe Building built between 14th and 15th streets in Downtown Richmond, Virginia. At 137 meters (449 feet) and 29 floors, it remains in 2015 as the tallest building in Richmond.
- 1983
  - Dominion Resources, Inc. in business.
  - Lewis Ginter Botanical Garden founded.
  - Richmond hosts the 1983 Central Fidelity Banks International indoor tennis tournament.
- 1984
  - Congress establishes the United Network for Organ Sharing, headquartered in Richmond; and in 1986 they are designated as the sole Organ Procurement and Transplantation Network manager in the US.
  - Richmond and surrounding municipalities build a new baseball stadium, The Diamond, to replace Parker Field.
  - The Enterprise Development Company, led by James W. Rouse, begins construction of the 6th Street Marketplace.
- 1985 – Innsbrook After Hours begins
  - 6th Street Marketplace opens and hosts the first ever "Friday Cheers".
- 1987 – Crestar Financial Corporation moves into a modern office tower on Main Street
- 1988—after three years of construction, the Lee Bridge was completely rebuilt and dedicated in November 1988.
- 1989
  - U.S. Supreme Court decides City of Richmond v. J.A. Croson Co. affirmative action-related lawsuit.
  - In the mid-1980s, completion of the State Route 144 (Temple Avenue Connector) and a new bridge across the Appomattox River provided connection between Colonial Heights and State Route 36 near Fort Lee.
  - Southpark Mall in business in Tri-Cities.
  - Virginia State Route 288 is completed between I-95 and Brandermill.
  - Richmond begins hosting a leg of the annual Tour de Trump, which would become the Tour DuPont in 1991.
  - December 1989 : The Edward E. Willey Bridge is completed across the James River, connecting Parham Road in the west end to the Chippenham Parkway on the Southside.
- 1990
  - January 13: Douglas Wilder sworn in as governor.
  - Population: 203,056.
  - Interstate 295 (a toll-free beltway around the east side of Richmond and Petersburg) opens.
  - Eugene P. Trani becomes president of Virginia Commonwealth University and begins strategic planning for the rapid growth of VCU.
  - Miller & Rhoads goes defunct and closes its department store.
- 1991
  - Virginia Center Commons opens at the northside intersection of 295 and I-95.
  - The Alliance of Baptists-established Baptist Theological Seminary at Richmond opens and classes begin.
- 1992
  - The state of Virginia eliminated toll collection along the Richmond–Petersburg Turnpike
  - Richmond News-Leader (Richmond's evening daily newspaper) ceases publication.
  - Thalhimers vacates its downtown department store.
  - Sports Backers is established.
- 1993
  - VCU French Film Festival begins.
  - Circuit City spins off CarMax.
  - Richmond Kickers is founded and plays games at City Stadium
- 1994
  - Richmond-based Signet Financial Corp spins off of its credit card division, later renaming it Capital One. Capital One remains a significant employment presence in Richmond.
  - Area musicians Gwar and Cracker, Agents of Good Roots, and Dave Matthews Band experience mainstream success.
- 1995
  - Landmark Theater refurbished.
  - Flood wall built, leading the development of Tobacco Row area into shops and loft apartments
  - Azalea Mall closes
  - Virginia BioTechnology Research Park Opens near the VCU Medical Center of Virginia campus
- 1996
  - In early January, a blizzard dumps one to two feet of snow on Central Virginia, blocking roads and closing area schools for days
  - City website online (approximate date).
  - Controversy over a Paul DiPasquale-designed Arthur Ashe monument on Monument Avenue being built
  - VCU Brandcenter and VCU School of Engineering open
  - The VMFA's Fabergé eggs are part of a popular Fabergé in America exhibit.
  - From 1996 to 2001, James Comey was Managing Assistant U.S. Attorney in charge of the Richmond Division of the United States Attorney for the Eastern District of Virginia. In 1996, Comey acted as deputy special counsel to the Senate Whitewater Committee. He also was the lead prosecutor in the case concerning the 1996 Khobar Towers bombing in Saudi Arabia. While in Richmond, Comey was an adjunct professor of law at the University of Richmond School of Law.
- 1997
  - Project Exile begins.
  - Ukrop's Food Group launches First Market Bank (now Atlantic Union Bank) with branches inside its grocery stores.
- 1998
  - Richmond-based Crestar Bank is acquired by SunTrust Banks
  - Sports Backers takes over the Richmond Marathon and makes several changes to the 1998 race including adding Crestar as the title sponsor.
  - Future governor and senator Tim Kaine is elected by his fellow council members to become the 76th Mayor of Richmond
- 1999
  - VCU Completes its new gymnasium, the Siegel Center
  - Richmond begins hosting an XTERRA Triathlon on James River Parks system trails
  - Sports Backers completes the Sports Backers Stadium
  - Mayor (1994–1996) and city council member (1993–1999) Leonidas B. Young, II is removed from city council for several felonies related to "influence peddling"
- 2000
  - Population: 197,753 (996,512 in the Richmond metro area)
  - Civil War Visitor Center at Tredegar Iron Works opens.
  - The Valentine Museum rebrands as "The Valentine Richmond History Center"
  - For seven weeks, the movie Hannibal filmed in Shockoe Bottom, primarily for a dramatic scene involving a shooting at a fish market.
  - In late May, Kroger enters the Richmond grocery market, and announces it has bought ten Hannafordstores in the Richmond area.
  - Ukrop supermarkets sponsor first ever Monument Avenue 10K which would grow to become one of the 10th largest 10Ks in the US
  - Richmond-based Reynolds Metals Company is purchased by Alcoa

== 21st century ==
=== 2000s ===
- 2001
  - Richmond's First Fridays Art Walk is initiated by area galleries with primary funding support from the Ukrop family
  - On September 11, 2001, Rudy McCollum is sworn in as Richmond's 77th Mayor after being elected by his fellow city council members.
- 2002
  - MeadWestvaco is created from a merger and moves their headquarters to Richmond.
  - Convention Center opens.
  - Virginia Commonwealth University hires Jeff Capel III as the head coach of its men's basketball team and during the 2003–04 season leads the team to the NCAA tournament for the first time since 1996.
  - HBO movie Iron Jawed Angels films in the Richmond area Fall 2002.
  - Virginia State Route 895 opens, shortening by 11 minutes the drive time between Chippenham Parkway to Richmond Airport.
  - Beltway snipers strike in Ashland
- 2003
  - Stony Point Fashion Park and Short Pump Town Center both open.
  - Hurricane Isabel knocks out power in Richmond for up to 10 days.
  - In February, the Greater Richmond Convention Center opened
  - Philip Morris USA moved headquarters from New York to Richmond.
  - Rod Lurie films a short-lived Sopranos-style gang drama based in Richmond called Line of Fire.
  - Following years of decline and a failed HVAC system, Sixth Street Marketplace was razed to make room for hotels and convention center developments. The original developer, the Enterprise Development Company, was evicted from ownership and management in 1988.
  - CSX Corporation headquarters moved to Jacksonville, Florida, and the president John Snow is appointed Secretary of the Treasury.
  - Main Street Station re-opens train service after a multimillion-dollar renovation.
  - Sa'ad El-Amin (city councilman from 1998 to 2003) resigns from city council after he is convicted of felony count of "conspiracy to attempt or evade taxes."
- 2004
  - Hurricane Gaston floods Shockoe Bottom and dumps over 12 inches of rain in the Richmond area.
  - The segment of Virginia State Route 288 from Brandermill northward across the James River is completed.
  - General Electric spins off its insurance businesses to create Genworth Financial, to be headquartered in Richmond.
  - River City Sports and Social Club founded as a coed adult social sports league
- 2005
  - After Congress passed low power broadcasting laws in 2000, WRIR-LP begins broadcasting one of the first LPFM stations in the United States.
  - Richmond switches to a Mayor–council government system and Douglas Wilder is elected mayor by the voters of Richmond.
  - Craigslist adds a Richmond, Virginia page.
  - Gallery 5 opens.
  - RVA Magazine begins publication.
  - Virginia Center for Architecture opens.
  - University of Richmond hires Chris Mooney as its men's basketball coach.
  - 2005 Base Realignment and Closure Commission leads to economic development in the Virginia Tricities area; over $1.36 billion is programmed for fiscal years 2007 to 2011 to fund construction at Fort Lee.
  - In October, the National Folk Festival holds the first of three (2005, 2006, 2007) annual festivals. Richmond creates the Richmond Folk Festival in 2008 with the same format.
- 2006
  - American Civil War Center at Historic Tredegar opens.
  - 2006 Richmond spree murders
  - RavenCon science fiction convention begins.
  - No BS! Brass forms.
  - VCU hires Anthony Grant as VCU Men's basketball coach. From 2006 to 2009, he coached future NBA players Eric Maynor and Larry Sanders and upset Duke in the 2007 NCAA tournament before departing for Alabama in 2009.
  - RVA Magazine and the New York Deli organize a guerilla "ball hoist" in Carytown atop the Byrd Theater a tradition that eventually draws thousands of people
- 2007
  - As part of the Jamestown 2007 festivities, the governor hosts Queen Elizabeth II at the Capitol Building.
  - The city of Richmond and Forest Hill community organizes South of the James Farmer's market at Forest Hill Park
  - Historian Edward L. Ayers becomes president of the University of Richmond, a post he would hold until 2015.
- 2008
  - Inaugural Richmond Folk Festival takes place
  - Cloverleaf Mall closes
  - Health Diagnostic Laboratory, Inc. (HDL) is founded in Richmond Biotech park
  - The University of Richmond opens UR Downtown campus to house three main programs: the Richmond Families Initiative, the Harry L. Carrico Center for Pro Bono Service and the Family Law Clinic
  - Richmond Kickers Academy established
  - The National concert venue opens on Broad Street
  - The 2008 financial crisis and the Great Recession puts several regional employers out of business including Circuit City, Qimonda, LandAmerica
  - 20-something Aaron Kremer founds Richmond BizSense on January 1, 2008, to cover Richmond business news.
- 2009
  - Dwight Clinton Jones becomes mayor.
  - Richmond CenterStage inaugurated.
  - Virginia Commonwealth University hires Shaka Smart as its men's basketball coach.
  - A Toad's Place franchise opens and quickly closes along the canal Walk.
  - The State Fair of Virginia moves from Richmond International Raceway to its new home in Meadow Event Park
  - Derek Cha opens his first Sweet Frog store, in Short Pump.
  - Richmond's chapter of the Social Media Club is founded
  - Venture Richmond and Sports Backers launch the annual Dominion RiverRock event in May and Anthem Moonlight Ride bicycle event in August

=== 2010s ===
- 2010
  - Population: 204,214. (1,208,101 in the Richmond Metro Area)
  - Ukrop family sells their chain of grocery stores to Giant foods; stores are renamed "Martin's"
  - In May, the Virginia Museum of Fine Arts completes its largest expansion in the museum's history, a four-year project that resulted in 165,000 more square feet, a new sculpture garden, the BEST cafe and Amuse Restaurant, and a 600-car parking deck.
  - Richmond Raiders indoor football team established
  - University of Richmond completes its on-campus football stadium, E. Claiborne Robins Stadium, and vacates City Stadium.
  - Venture Richmond partners with Martin Agency, the VCU Brandcenter, and local PR firms to promote "RVA Downtown/RVA Creates" concept. This logo leads to the development the ubiquitous RVA Sticker in 2011.
  - After the Richmond Braves relocated to Atlanta suburbs in 2009, the Richmond Flying Squirrels began playing in 2010. While the Flying Squirrels play at The Diamond, team management expects Richmond to build a replacement stadium.
- 2011
  - Richmond is selected to host the 2015 UCI Road World Championships
  - Both the Uof R and VCU basketball teams advance to the elite 8; VCU gets to the Final Four.
  - Megabus begins operating at Main Street Station, with connections to cities between Atlanta and Washington, D.C..
  - Richmond Kickers make a "Cinderella run" to the Semifinals of the 2011 Lamar Hunt U.S. Open Cup
  - Hardywood Park Craft Brewery opens in the industrial area north of Broad Street near the Fan
  - From October to December, Steven Spielberg films his Lincoln movie almost entirely within the Richmond-Petersburg area including the State Capitol Grounds, Old Town Petersburg, and Maymont Park. Richmonders spot Daniel Day-Lewis, Sally Field, Joseph Gordon-Levitt, and others at area establishments.
  - In November 2011, Richmond hosts a WordCamp conference.
- 2012
  - Virginia Repertory Theatre formed.
  - Peter Chang establishes restaurant presence in Richmond
  - Musician Matthew E. White earns accolades, including Paste magazine's Best New Act of 2012,
  - Beer Boom in Scott's Addition begins: Virginia changes its blue laws to permit breweries to sell beer on site without offering food, and the "Virginia Beer Boom" begins in Richmond, particularly in Scott's Addition. By 2018, VinePair named Richmond the world's top beer destination for 2018.
- 2013
  - Richmond Kickers sign a multi-year deal to become the USL Pro affiliate of the D.C. United
  - The VMFA acquires "Red Reeds" a site-specific work Dale Chihuly created for the VMFA's reflecting pool in conjunction with his exhibit October 20, 2012- February 10, 2013,
  - In March, Richmond hosts its first annual TEDxRVA event
  - On July 9, 2013, Virginia Governor Bob McDonnell announced that an International Mountain Bicycling Association Richmond Region Ride Center would open in 2014 in the Richmond, Virginia metro region as the first legacy project of the Richmond 2015 Bike Race.
- 2014
  - Estimated Population: 217,853 (estimated 1,260,000 in the Richmond Metro Area)
  - Amazon.com opens a Fulfillment Center in Meadowville Technology Park
  - In October, Stone Brewing Co. announced that Richmond would be the site for its first brewery in the eastern United States.
- 2015
  - First Freedom Center opens in Shockoe Slip in January and becomes part of The Valentine in July.
  - Work begins on a Tier II environmental impact statement for the 123 mi portion of the Southeast High Speed Rail Corridor between the Washington, D.C., metro area and Richmond. SEHSR promotional materials project that passenger service would begin between 2018 and 2022.
  - The GRTC announces that bus rapid transit system called GRTC Pulse to begin operations by October 2017
  - After winning the A10 Championship, VCU men's basketball coach Shaka Smart departs for University of Texas, and is quickly replaced by Will Wade.
  - Quirk Hotel and Virginia Capital Trail are completed in time for the 2015 UCI Road World Championships held September 19–27.
  - October 29 -- Libbie Mill library opens, representing the first fruits of the massive 80-acre Libbie Mill-Midtown development being undertaken by Gumenick Properties.
  - Population: 220,289 (estimate).
- 2016
  - Lucy Dacus, a Richmond area native, releases her debut album No Burden, signs to Matador Records, and rises to national attention (performing at Lollapalooza, CBS This Morning, and NPR's Tiny Desk Concert).
  - In January, Winter Storm Jonas dumps 16 inches of snow on Richmond, cancelling all flights out of Richmond International Airport on January 23, and causing the Greater Richmond Transit Company (GTRC) bus system to take the rare step of suspending all routes on January 24.
  - In February, Stone Brewing Co. opens its first brewery on the East Coast, in Rockett's Landing.
  - In June, the 29-story art deco skyscraper Central National Bank building reopens as "Deco at CNB"
  - December 2 -- The T. Tyler Potterfield Memorial pedestrian bridge opens, connecting Brown's Island to the James River Parks System on the Manchester side of the river.
- 2017
  - On January 7, Levar Stoney is sworn in as Richmond's youngest ever mayor. He is 35 years old.
  - In the wake of the Unite the Right rally violence incidents in Charlottesville, protestors including Antifa and Black Lives Matter gathered on Monument Avenue to stage an anti-racist counter-demonstration on August 14. A CBS6 cameraman was injured in the fracas. A month later, when local confederate groups announced a rally on Monument Avenue for September 17, a significant police presence and counter-demonstration staged opposition and continued the debate over Monument Avenue's confederate statues.
  - In October, Facebook announces plans to construct a $1 billion, 970,000-square-foot data center on about 330 acres of White Oak Technology Park.
  - In November, Mayor Stoney announces a major downtown development plan involving replacing the Richmond Coliseum with a 17,500-seat arena and redeveloping the surrounding area.
- 2018
  - On Sunday January 7, a cold snap sends temperatures plummeting to negative 3 degrees Fahrenheit, the coldest recorded temperature in 33 years. Pipes break across the city including flooding of I-95 downtown.
  - Richmond Grocery Wars: In the wake of the disappearance of Martin's and Ukrops, grocery chains such as Lidl, Publix, Wegmans, and Aldi continue to open stores in the Richmond area, squeezing existing stores like Kroger, Walmart, and Food Lion.
  - June 24—the GRTC Pulse (bus rapid transit system) opens, connecting Rocketts Landing to Scott's Addition to Willow Lawn. Mayor Stoney states that the $65 million project will generate $1 billion in economic activity over the next 20 years, resulting in a $15 return on investment for every dollar invested.
  - As Hurricane Florence made landfall and moved through North Carolina, low-topped supercells developed from this system remnants that had moved north to the Richmond area. This system created 10 tornadoes (ranging from EF0 to EF2) that hit the greater Richmond region in the course of the afternoon of Monday September 17, killing one and damaging multiple buildings on the Southside. Many area schools sheltered students in place in some cases until 6:30PM.

=== 2020s ===
- 2020
  - On June 1, Richmond Police fired tear gas on violent protestors and rioters vandalizing the Robert E. Lee Monument.
- 2025
  - On January 5, a winter storm caused flooding in the Richmond Department of Public Utilities Water Treatment Plant. This caused an electrical power failure in the plant, ceasing water production. This left the City of Richmond and surrounding counties without potable water for about a week.

== See also ==
- History of Richmond, Virginia
- National Register of Historic Places listings in Richmond, Virginia
- Neighborhoods of Richmond, Virginia
- List of mayors of Richmond, Virginia
- Timelines of other cities in Virginia: Alexandria, Hampton, Lynchburg, Newport News, Norfolk, Portsmouth, Roanoke, Virginia Beach

== Bibliography ==
=== Published in 18th-19th century ===
- Jedidiah Morse (1797), "Richmond", The American gazetteer, Boston: At the presses of S. Hall, and Thomas & Andrews
- Richard Edwards (1855), "Richmond", Statistical gazetteer of the state of Virginia, Richmond: Published for the proprietor
- Richmond Directory and Business Advertiser for 1856. Richmond: M. Ellyson. 1856.
- Samuel Mordecai (1856), Richmond in by-gone days, Richmond, Va: George M. West, OL 271671M
- R.H. Long (1863), "Richmond", Hunt's Gazetteer of the Border and Southern States, Pittsburgh, Pa.: John P. Hunt
- R. A. Brock (1880), Richmond as a Manufacturing and Trading Centre, Richmond: Jones & Cook
- J.H. Chataigne, ed. (1881). "Richmond". The Chesapeake & Ohio Railway Directory.
- Chataigne's Directory of Richmond, Va. [Richmond, Va.] : Baughman Bros. 1881 – via Internet Archive.
  - 1882 ed.
  - 1883 ed.
  - 1889 ed.
- Advantages of Richmond, Virginia, as a manufacturing and trading centre, Richmond: Chamber of Commerce and Commercial Club, 1882, OL 24350408M
- Joseph Sabin, ed. (1888). "Richmond, Virginia". Bibliotheca Americana. Vol. 17. New York: New York : Joseph Sabin. OCLC 13972268.
- Watkins Norvell (1896), Richmond, Virginia: colonial, revolutionary, confederate and the present, Richmond, Va: E. B. Brown, OCLC 5423613, OL 271672M

=== Published in 20th century ===
- William Wirt Henry (1904), "Richmond on the James", in Lyman P. Powell (ed.), Historic Towns of the Southern States, New York: G. P. Putnam's Sons
- Virginia. Dept. of Agriculture and Immigration (1906), "Richmond", A Handbook of Virginia: Information for the Homeseeker and Investor, Lynchburg, Va: J. P. Bell Co., OCLC 6466827
- Souvenir Views: Negro Enterprises & Residences, Richmond, Va., Richmond: D. A. Ferguson, 1907, OL 5109683M
- Richmond Guide Book, Richmond, Virginia: M. A. Burgess, 1909, OL 24363987M
- "Richmond (Virginia)" . Encyclopædia Britannica. Vol. 23 (11th ed.). 1910. pp. 309–311.
- W. Asbury Christian (1912), Richmond, her past and present, Richmond, Va: Manufactured by L.H. Jenkins, OCLC 1253125, OL 6548616M
- Edward Hungerford (1913), "City of the 7 Hills", The Personality of American Cities, New York: McBride, Nast & Company
- Richmond Chamber of Commerce (1913), Richmond, Virginia, yesterday and today, Richmond: Whittet & Shepperson, printers, OCLC 6214750, OL 6565301M
- Society for the Betterment of Housing and Living Conditions in Richmond (1913), Report on housing and living conditions in the neglected sections of Richmond, Virginia, Richmond, Va: Whittet & Shepperson, printers, OL 7043534M
- Louise Nurney Kernodle (1918). Guide Book of the City of Richmond.
- Directory of Business and Professional Women. 1921
- "City of Richmond, Virginia". The Modern City. 7. League of American Municipalities. November 1922.
- Federal Writers' Project (1941), "Richmond", Virginia: a Guide to the Old Dominion, American Guide Series, Oxford University Press, ISBN 9780403021956 – via Google Books
- Virginius Dabney (1990) [1976]. Richmond: The Story of a City. University Press of Virginia.
- Michael B. Chesson. Richmond after the War, 1865–1890. Richmond: Virginia State Library, 1981.
- Peter J. Rachleff. Black Labor in the South: Richmond, Virginia, 1865–1890. Philadelphia: Temple University Press, 1984.
- Patricia C. Click. The Spirit of the Times: Amusements in Nineteenth-Century Baltimore, Norfolk, and Richmond. Charlottesville: University Press of Virginia, 1989.
- Marie Tyler-McGraw. At the Falls: Richmond, Virginia, and Its People. Chapel Hill: University of North Carolina Press, 1994.
- Trudy Ring and Robert M. Salkin, ed. (1995). "Richmond". Americas. International Dictionary of Historic Places. Routledge. p. 542+. ISBN 978-1-134-25930-4.
- Peter Wallenstein (2000). "Richmond". In Paul Finkelman (ed.). Encyclopedia of the United States in the Nineteenth Century. Charles Scribner's Sons. ISBN 0-684-80500-6.

=== Published in 21st century ===
- Elvatrice Parker Belsches (2002). Richmond, Virginia. Black America. Charleston, South Carolina: Arcadia.
- Richard Pillsbury, ed. (2006). "Richmond". Geography. New Encyclopedia of Southern Culture. Vol. 2. University of North Carolina Press. p. 195. OCLC 910189354.
- David Goldfield, ed. (2007). "Richmond, Virginia". Encyclopedia of American Urban History. Sage. ISBN 978-1-4522-6553-7.
