= William Martin =

William Martin may refer to:

== Arts ==
- William Martin (painter) (1753 – c. 1836), English history painter
- William Martin (architect) (1829–1900), British architect
- E. William Martin (1891–1977), Scottish-born American architect
- William Martin (garden designer) (born 1953), Scottish-born Australian plantsman and garden designer
- William Martin (novelist), American novelist
- William Martin (tenor) (1898–1960), American opera singer
- William E. Martin (1945–2016), American songwriter, screenwriter and voice actor
- William H. "Dad" Martin (fl. 1894–1912), American photographer
- William Martin (director) (fl. 1974–2017), American stage director
- Bill Martin Jr. (William Ivan Martin Jr., 1916–2004), American educator, publishing executive, and author

== Military ==
- William T. Martin (1823–1910), American lawyer, politician and Confederate States Army general
- William Martin (Royal Navy officer) (c. 1696–1756), naval officer and admiral
- Sir William Martin, 4th Baronet (1801–1895), First Sea Lord of Britain, 1858–1859
- William Martin (American sailor, USS Benton) (1835–1914), New York born American Civil War sailor and Medal of Honor recipient
- William Martin (American sailor, USS Varuna) (fl. 1839–1863), Irish-born American Civil War sailor and Medal of Honor recipient
- William Martin (Royal Marines officer), invented by British military intelligence for a Second World War deception plan
- William Franklin Martin (1863–1942), United States Army general

== Politics and government ==
- William Martin, 1st Baron Martin (died 1324), English noble
- Sir William Martin (Athelhampton), MP for Dorset in 1478
- William Martin (MP for Exeter) (died c. 1609), MP for Exeter (UK Parliament constituency), 1597
- William D. Martin (1789–1833), US congressman from South Carolina
- William Martin (merchant) (1806–1859), American merchant, politician in Tennessee
- Sir William Martin (judge) (1807–1880), first chief justice of New Zealand, 1841–1857
- William Harrison Martin (1822–1898), U.S. representative from Texas
- William V. Martin (fl. 1880–1916), British vice-consul in Ferrol, Spain
- William T. Martin (mayor) (1788–1866), mayor of Columbus, Ohio
- Lee Martin (politician) (William Lee Martin, 1870–1950), New Zealand politician of the Labour Party
- William Melville Martin (1876–1970), premier of Saskatchewan
- William Martin (Canadian politician) (1886–1973), Canadian clergyman and politician
- William Martin (Scottish politician) (1886–1939), British MP for Dunbartonshire, 1923–1924
- William McChesney Martin (1906–1998), American business executive, former Federal Reserve Chairman
- William Martin (Australian politician) (1834–1917), New South Wales politician
- William B. Martin (1846–1916), American politician
- William O'Hara Martin (1845–1901), American merchant, politician and banker from Nevada
- William E. Martin (New York politician) (1886–1923), American politician from New York
- William J. Martin (1861–1941), member of the California State Assembly
- William Martin (unionist) (1845–1923), Scottish-born American labor union leader

== Science, engineering and philosophy ==
- William Martin (naturalist) (1767–1810), English naturalist and palaeontologist
- William Martin (philosopher) (1772–1851), English inventor, eccentric, and philosopher
- William Charles Linnaeus Martin (1798–1864), English naturalist
- William Clyde Martin Jr. (1929–2013), American physicist
- William Keble Martin (1877–1969), British botanist
- William A. Martin (1938–1981), American computer scientist
- William F. Martin (born 1957), American botanist and molecular biologist
- William Flynn Martin (born 1950), American energy economist, educator and diplomat
- William Hamilton Martin (1931–1987), American cryptologist, defector to the Soviet Union

== Sport ==
- William Martin (Australian cricketer) (1856–1938), Australian cricketer
- William Martin (English cricketer) (1844–1871), English cricketer
- William Martin (English footballer), professional footballer for Huddersfield Town
- William Martin (footballer, born 2007), Danish-Irish footballer
- William Martin (sport shooter) (1866–1931), American Olympic sport shooter
- William Martin (swimmer) (born 2000), Australian Paralympic swimmer
- William Martin (water polo) (1906–1980), British Olympic water polo player
- William Martin (Olympic sailor) (1828–1905), French sailor
- Bill Martin (athletic director) (William C. Martin), University of Michigan athletics director
- William K. Martin (c. 1868–1949), American college football and baseball coach
- Trevor Martin (umpire) (William Trevor Martin, 1925–2017), New Zealand Test cricket umpire
- Willie Martin (Scottish footballer) (fl. 1933–1940)
- Bill Martin (basketball) (William Martin, born 1962), American basketball player
- Bill Martin (footballer) (William Thomas James Martin, 1883–1954), English footballer
- Bill Martin (rugby league) (William Martin, 1933–2007), English rugby league player
- Billy Martin (halfback) (William Vance Martin, 1938–1976), American football halfback
- Billy Martin (shortstop) (William Gloyd Martin, 1894–1949), American Major League Baseball player

== Others ==
- William Martin (born 1796), with Bass and Flinders in Tom Thumb, see Martin Islet (New South Wales)
- William Alexander Parsons Martin (1827–1916), American Presbyterian missionary and translator
- William Byam Martin, English merchant and official of the East India Company
- William Clyde Martin (1893–1984), American Methodist bishop
- William Joseph Martin Jr. (1868–1943), president of Davidson College
- William R. H. Martin (1842–1912), American businessman
- William Thomas Martin (fl. 1883–1947), South Australian school inspector
- Bill Martin (museum director) (William J. Martin, 1954–2025), American public historian and museum director
- Bill Martin (sociologist) (William Craig Martin, 1956–2016), Australian sociologist
- Billy Martin (lawyer) (William R. Martin), American lawyer

== See also ==
- Will Martin (disambiguation)
- Bill Martin (disambiguation)
- Billy Martin (disambiguation)
- Willie Martin (Canadian football) (born 1951), American-born Canadian football player
- William Martyn (disambiguation)
