= Bill Martin =

Bill Martin is the name of:

== Music ==
- Bill Martin (songwriter) (1938–2020), Scottish songwriter
- William E. Martin (1945–2016), also credited as Bill Martin, American songwriter, screenwriter, and voice actor
- Bill Martin, a briefly-used stage name of Billy Joel around 1972

== Sports ==
- C. W. Martin (1887–1978), known as Bill, head football coach at the University of North Carolina at Chapel Hill, 1912
- Bill Martin (athletic director), American college athletics administrator
- Bill Martin (basketball) (born 1962), American basketball player
- Bill Martin (cyclist), winner of the 1901 Austral Wheel Race
- Bill Martin (footballer) (1883–1954), English footballer
- Bill Martin (rugby league) (c. 1933–2007), rugby league footballer of the 1960s for Great Britain and Workington Town
- Bill Martin (runner) (born 1957), winner of the 1000 yards at the 1981 USA Indoor Track and Field Championships

== Other ==
- Bill Martin (artist) (1943–2008), California visionary painter
- Bill Martin (museum director) (1954–2025), American public historian
- Bill Martin (philosopher) (born 1956), American philosopher at DePaul University
- Bill Martin (politician), American politician
- Bill Martin (sociologist) (1956–2016), Australian sociologist
- Bill Martin Jr. (1916–2004), American children's book author

== See also ==
- Billy Martin (disambiguation)
- William Martin (disambiguation)
