= Willie Martin =

Willie Martin may refer to:

- Willie Martin (Canadian football) (born 1951), American-born Canadian football player
- Willie Martin (Scottish footballer) (fl. 1933–1940)

== See also ==
- William Martin (disambiguation)
