= William Martyn =

William Martyn may refer to:

- William Martyn (Lord Mayor) (c. 1446–1503), Sheriff of London and Lord Mayor of London
- William Óge Martyn (died 1592), mayor of Galway
- William Martyn (historian) (1562–1617), English lawyer and historian
- Will Martyn (born 2001), Australian rules footballer

== See also ==
- William Martin (disambiguation)
