= Statue of Williams Carter Wickham =

Former monument in Richmond, Virginia

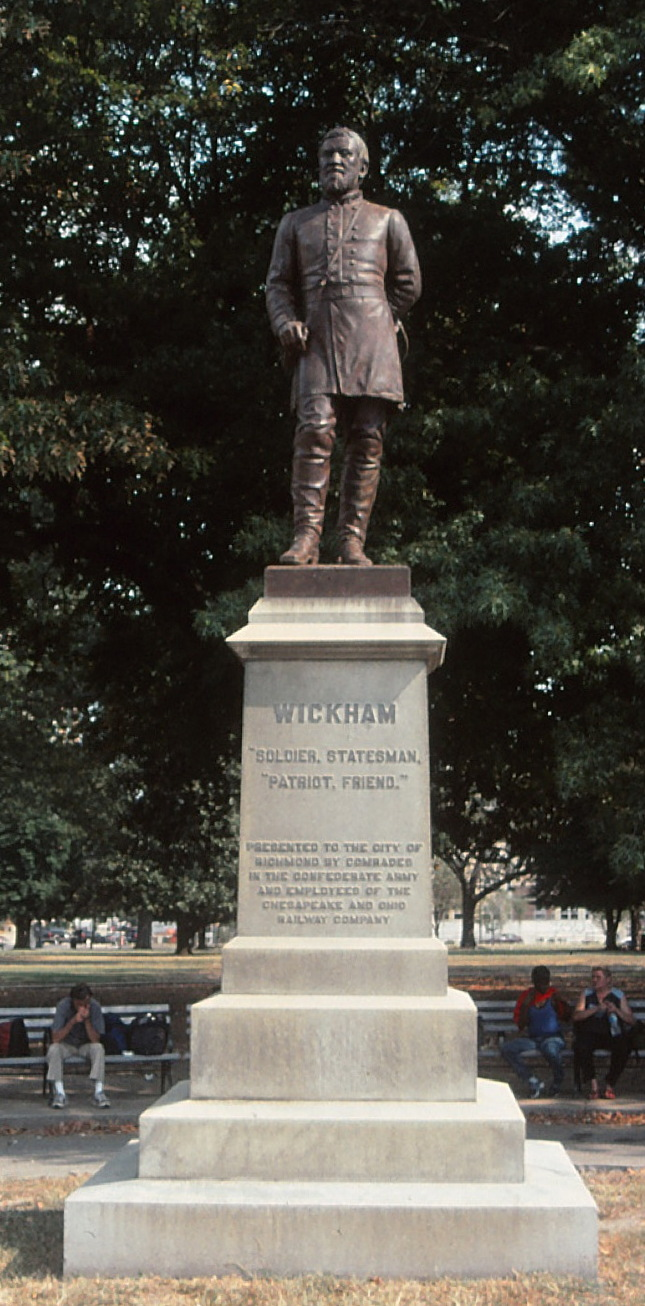
- Statue of Wickham, c. 2010s
- Artist: Edward Virginius Valentine
- Year: 1891
- Medium: Bronze sculpture; granite (base)
- Subject: Williams Carter Wickham
- Location: Richmond, Virginia, U.S.; 37.5472°N 77.4510°W

The statue of the Confederate States of America cavalry general Williams Carter Wickham by Edward Virginius Valentine was installed in Richmond, Virginia's Monroe Park in 1891, near Virginia Commonwealth University's main campus. It was toppled in June 2020 during the George Floyd protests.

== Description ==
The bronze sculpture was designed by Edward Virginius Valentine. It measures approximately 7 by 1 1/2 by 1 1/2 feet (213 cm × 46 cm × 46 cm), and rests on a granite base measuring approximately 120 by 88 1/2 by 88 1/2 inches (305 cm × 225 cm × 225 cm) The statue depicts Williams Carter Wickham wearing a Confederate uniform and holding a case for his field glasses in his proper right hand. He holds a pair of gloves behind his back in his opposite hand. Originally, he had a sword, which was later removed by vandals. An inscription on the front of the base reads:

WICKHAM
"SOLDIER STATESMAN
"PATRIOT, FRIEND."
PRESENTED TO THE CITY OF RICHMOND BY COMRADES
IN THE CONFEDERATE ARMY
AND EMPLOYEES OF THE
CHESAPEAKE AND OHIO
RAILWAY COMPANY

Another on the back of the base reads:

WILLIAMS CARTER WICKHAM
SEPTEMBER 21ST 1820
JULY 23RD 1888

== History ==
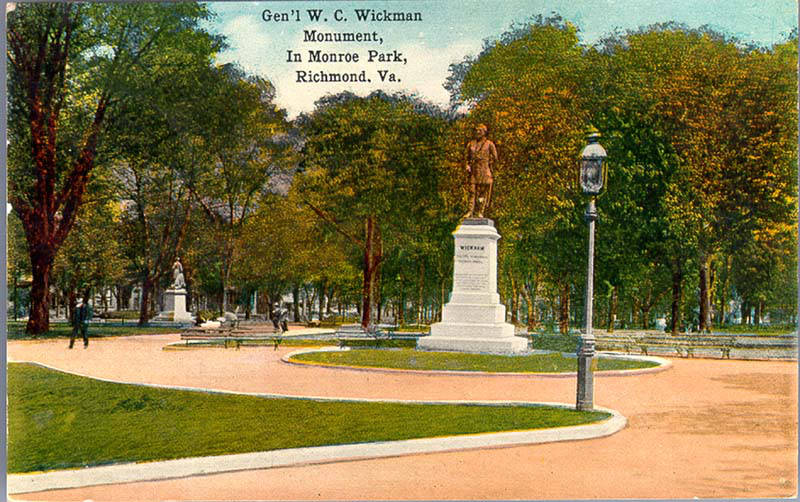
Postcard showing the statue

Not long after Wickham's death, employees of the Chesapeake and Ohio Railway, "all of whom were sincerely devoted to the deceased, whose memory they tenderly cherish and revere," initiated an effort to erect a bronze statue in his memory. As of September 1889, a committee consisting of ex-Senator John Callahan, C.T. Dabney, W.B. Waldron, E.C. Meredith, and W.J. Binford partnered with sculptor Edward V. Valentine to create and erect a statue so as to "perpetuate the heroic life and gallant deeds of the late Gen. William C. Wickham." Erected in 1891, the work was the gift of Williams' fellow soldiers and the employees of the Chesapeake and Ohio Railway.

Vandals stole Wickham's sword in August 1956.

The artwork was surveyed by the Smithsonian Institution's "Save Outdoor Sculpture!" in 1995.

In 2017, Clayton and Will Wickham, two of Wickham's descendants, requested that the city of Richmond remove the statue. In their letter to the city council, the brothers wrote that "as a plantation owner, Confederate general and industrialist, General Wickham unapologetically accrued power and wealth through the exploitation of enslaved people".

Public objections to the sculpture's presence in Monroe Park increased during the 2020 George Floyd protests. In June 2020, protesters toppled the sculpture using ropes.

== See also ==
- 1891 in art
- List of Confederate monuments and memorials in Virginia
- List of monuments and memorials removed during the George Floyd protests
