= Will Martin (disambiguation) =

Will Martin may refer to:

- Will Martin, the New Zealand singer
- Will Martin (sailor), the American sailor
- Will Martin (rugby union), the New Zealand rugby player
- Will Martin (economist), Australian economist
- Will Martin, captain of the 1921 Nevada Sagebrushers football team
- Will Martin, candidate in the 2022 Wisconsin gubernatorial election

== See also ==
- William Martin (disambiguation)
