= Billy Martin (disambiguation) =

Billy Martin (1928–1989) was a Major League Baseball player and manager.

Billy Martin may also refer to:

== Music ==
- Billy Martin (percussionist) (born 1963), drummer for jazz trio Medeski Martin & Wood
- Billy Martin (guitarist) (born 1981), guitarist for American band Good Charlotte
- Billy Martin, an alias used by Paul McCartney to record his debut solo album, McCartney, in Abbey Road Studios

== Sports ==
- Billy Martin (shortstop) (1894–1949), American baseball player
- Billy Martin (curler) (born c. 1933), Canadian curler
- Billy Martin (halfback) (1938–1976), American football player
- Billy Martin (tight end) (1942–2018), American football player
- Billy Martin (tennis) (born 1956), American tennis player in the 1970s

== Other ==
- Billy Martin (author) (born 1967), known professionally as Poppy Z. Brite, American author
- Billy Martin (lawyer), lawyer with Dorsey & Whitney LLP

== See also ==
- Bill Martin (disambiguation)
- William Martin (disambiguation)
