= Admiston =

Admiston has, historically, referred to two places in England:

- Aldermaston in Berkshire
- Athelhampton in Dorset
