= Statue of Robert E. Lee (Valentine) =

Statue formerly in the United States Capitol

Robert E. Lee
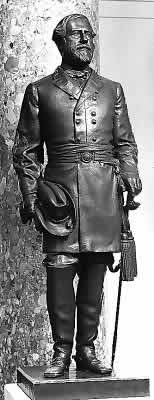
- The statue
- Artist: Edward Virginius Valentine
- Medium: Bronze sculpture
- Subject: Robert E. Lee
- Location: Richmond, Virginia, United States

Robert E. Lee is a bronze sculpture commemorating the general of the same name by Edward Virginius Valentine, formerly installed in the crypt of the United States Capitol as part of the National Statuary Hall Collection. The statue was given by the Commonwealth of Virginia in 1909. On December 21, 2020, the sculpture was removed from the grounds of the United States Capitol and relocated to the Virginia Museum of History & Culture.

== Replacement ==
On January 2, 2020, Virginia governor Ralph Northam requested a bill to remove the statue from the U.S. Capitol building. The idea came from United States representatives Jennifer Wexton and Donald McEachin. "These statutes aimed to rewrite Lee’s reputation from that of a cruel slave owner and Confederate General to portraying him as a kind man and reluctant war hero who selflessly served his home state of Virginia," Wexton and McEachin wrote in a letter to Northam. The pair suggested several potential candidates, including educator and orator Booker T. Washington and civil rights attorney Oliver Hill.

On December 16, 2020, the Commission on Historical Statues in the United States Capitol unanimously recommended that the Lee statue be replaced with a statue of civil rights activist Barbara Rose Johns as the Virginian representative within the collection. The statue of Robert E. Lee was removed from the National Statuary Hall five days later, on 21 December with Wexton, McEachin, and Virginia United States Senator Tim Kaine in attendance. It was then transferred to the Virginia Museum of History & Culture.

== See also ==
- 1909 in art
- List of Confederate monuments and memorials
