= The Valentine =

- The Valentine
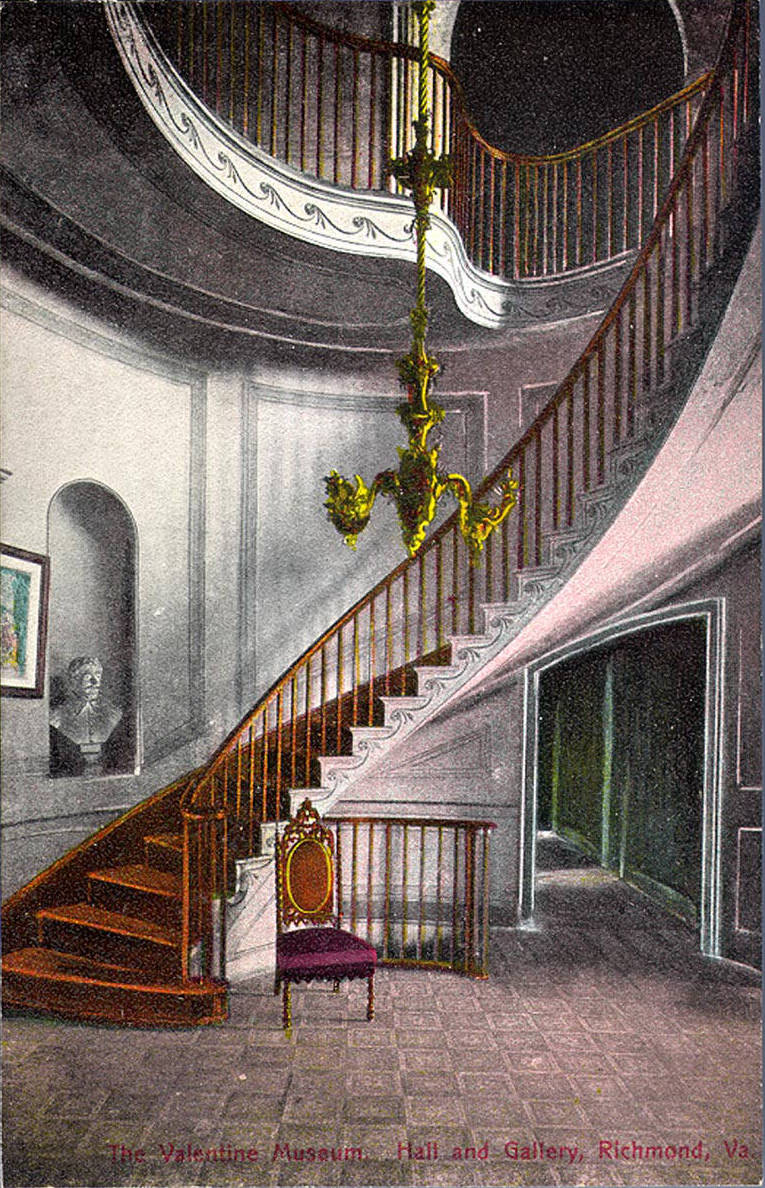
- Entrance stairwell, postcard c. 1910
- Established: 1898
- Location: Richmond, Virginia
- Type: History Museum & National Historic Landmark
- Collection size: Multiple
- Directors: Meg Hughes, Acting Director
- Website: http://www.thevalentine.org

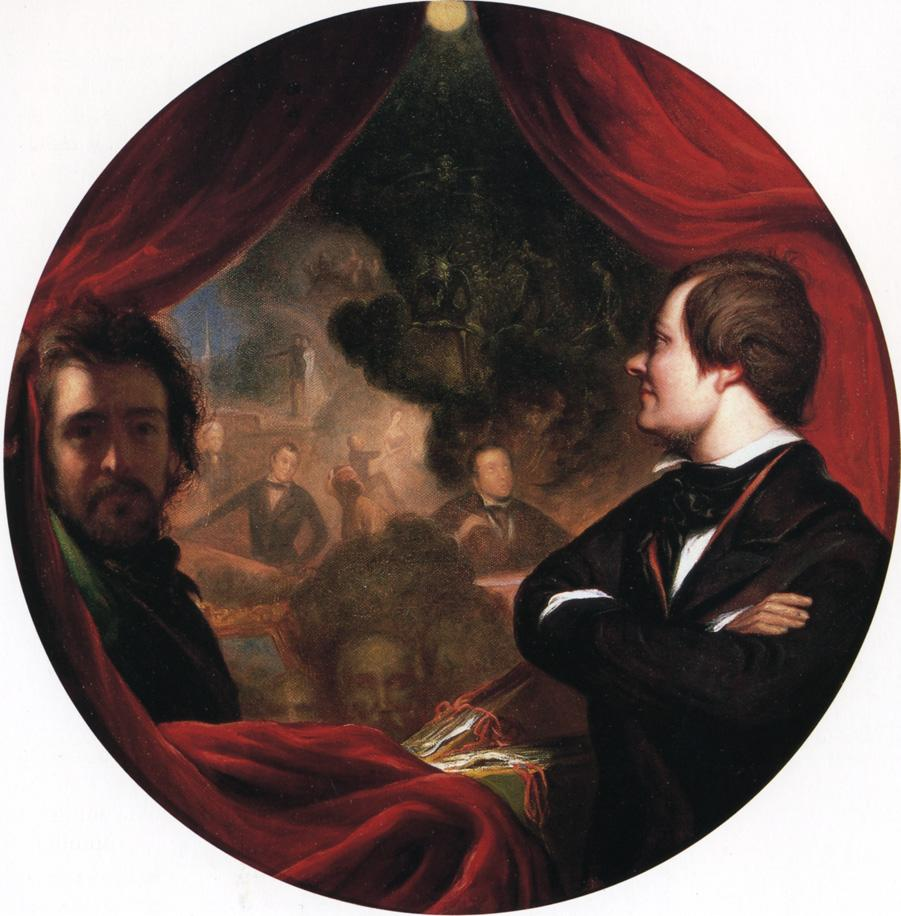
Mann S. Valentine and the Artist, oil on canvas, William James Hubard, 1852. Collection of the Valentine

The Valentine is a museum in Richmond, Virginia dedicated to collecting, preserving and interpreting Richmond's history. Founded by Mann S. Valentine II 1898, it was the first museum in Richmond.

In the early 21st century, the Valentine offers rotating exhibitions, walking tours, programs, special events, research opportunities and more as a way to engage, educate and challenge a diverse audience. The Valentine also includes the Wickham House, a National Historical Landmark.

== History ==
=== Meat juice fortune and beginnings ===
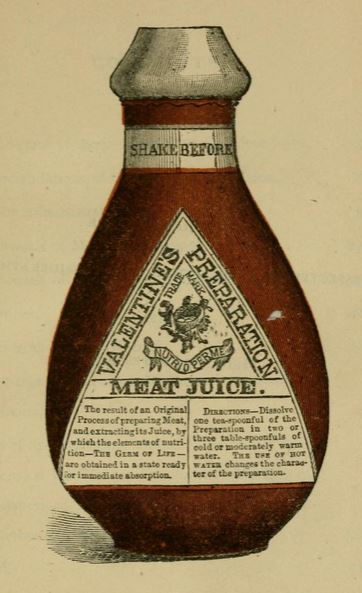
Funds for the original museum artifacts came from wealth amassed selling Valentine's Meat Juice.

The funds for the museum were provided by Mann S. Valentine II, who made his fortune with Valentine's Meat Juice, a health tonic made from beef juice invented as early as 1870. Mann and his sons earned their fortune from the Valentine Meat Juice Company.

During the late 19th century, the Valentines began to collect in the fields of archaeology, anthropology, fine arts and decorative arts. His sons conducted excavations of Native American earthwork mounds in former Cherokee towns in western North Carolina in their hunt for artifacts. They did considerable damage to the mounds.

Mann laid the foundation for the museum in 1892. When he died in 1893, he provided the original bequest for the Valentine Museum, leaving his collection of art and artifacts, the 1812 John Wickham House and a $50,000 endowment to the City of Richmond to establish the museum. Their collection of art and artifacts was the foundation of the exhibitions when the Valentine Museum opened in 1898. At the time, the Valentine Museum became the first private museum in the City of Richmond.

Mann S. Valentine II's brother Edward Virginius Valentine also had an interest in history and was a well-known sculptor. Edward Valentine served as the museum's first president from 1898 to his death in 1930. According to the museum website, Edward Valentine left a large collection of sculpture, papers, furniture and memorabilia to the museum in his will.

The Valentine acquired a collection of Richmond photographs from George S. Cook and Huestis Pratt Cook, when they were found in the attic of the home of the latter's widow.

=== Evolution of Richmond's oldest museum ===
In 1924, the museum asked Charleston Museum director Laura Bragg to consult on a reorganization, which got under way four years later. It was the museum's first major renovation and expansion. As part of the project, the museum purchased three rowhouses adjacent to the Wickham House for the purposes of holding artifacts. The museum renovated the Wickham house to reflect the circa 1812 period when the first owner, John Wickham and his family lived there.

On May 20, 1969, the Virginia Historic Landmarks Commission nominated the Valentine Museum buildings to be on the National Register of Historic Places, based on criteria of the 1966 National Historic Preservation Act. The Valentine Museum was listed on June 11, 1969.

In the 1970s, a major renovation and expansion was undertaken to add a new wing to accommodate more artifacts and increase exhibition space for the public. The Row Houses that served as the primary museum's space were renovated and expanded as well.

In 1985, the Valentine hired Frank Jewell and took steps to revitalize the institution. The board asked him to focus on how the museum could address such issues as racism, the southern black experience, and the city's complicated history; it gained national attention as a result. In 1988, the Museum worked with Mary Tyler McGraw, formerly of the Afro-American Communities project at the National Museum of American History. She developed an exhibit called "In Bondage and Freedom: Antebellum Black Life in Richmond." This project engaged scholars with knowledge of social and African-American history.

In August 2014, the museum changed its name to the Valentine and adopted the subtitle "Richmond Stories." In October of that same year, the Valentine completed renovations to its public exhibition galleries. The renovations featured more accessible gallery spaces, a new education center, lobby, and multi-purpose room.

In July 2015, the Valentine took over management of First Freedom Center, an historic site.

On December 28, 2025, longtime Valentine director Bill Martin died, having served in leadership roles at the museum since 1994.

== Permanent exhibition - This is Richmond, Virginia ==
The Valentine's permanent exhibition, entitled This is Richmond, Virginia, is on display on the main level. It tells the story of Virginia's Capital City according to five distinct themes. The objects on display are a part of The Valentine's extensive collection; they help express diverse personal stories to tell the larger history of this ever-evolving region.

== Richmond History Tours ==
In the fall of 1942, The Valentine and historic preservation champion Mary Wingfield Scott launched a series of walking tours exploring Richmond. These early walking tours brought Richmond citizens together to explore their city, visiting areas such as Gamble's Hill, Church Hill, Oregon Hill, Jackson Ward, and Hollywood Cemetery.

Today, the museum continues Scott's work by providing residents of Richmond the opportunity to explore the city by foot, bus and bike. The goal is for them to share the diverse and inclusive stories of the city by exploring the ever-changing urban landscape. The Valentine offers nearly 450 tours a year.

Weekly tours cover Hollywood Cemetery, Downtown Richmond and Shockoe Bottom. Each month between March and October is dedicated to a different historic Richmond neighborhood. Specialty tours are also offered, including the history of Richmond and the James River, a walk through the Broad Street Arts District, and an exploration of Carytown's LGBTQ+ history.

== Rotating exhibitions ==
The Valentine has several rotating exhibitions that include photographs, clothes and textiles, and historically based exhibits on issues that affected Richmond in a significant way.

- A History of Richmond in 50 Objects, opened on February 14, 2014 in the Massey Gallery on the main floor of the museum.
- History Ink: The Tattoo Archive Project, ran from November 2, 2012 to March 31, 2013; it focused on the rising popularity of tattoos in American culture and locally in Richmond.
- The Waste Not, Want Not: Richmond's Great Depression, 1929-1941, exhibition was on display from October 2009 until September 2010. It demonstrated life in Richmond during the Great Depression.
- In February 2011, the museum invited the public to submit original captions for up to 100 random images from The Valentine's Richmond Times-Dispatch Collection. The winning captions appeared alongside the respective photos, along with the actual captions that ran in the Richmond newspapers. This exhibition was on display at The Valentine and the Richmond Times-Dispatch until September 2011.
- In 2011, The Inaugural Gowns of Virginia's First Ladies displayed nine gowns worn at inaugural balls or receptions held in honor of the new Virginia Governor.
