= Williams C. Wickham =

Confederate Army general and American politician

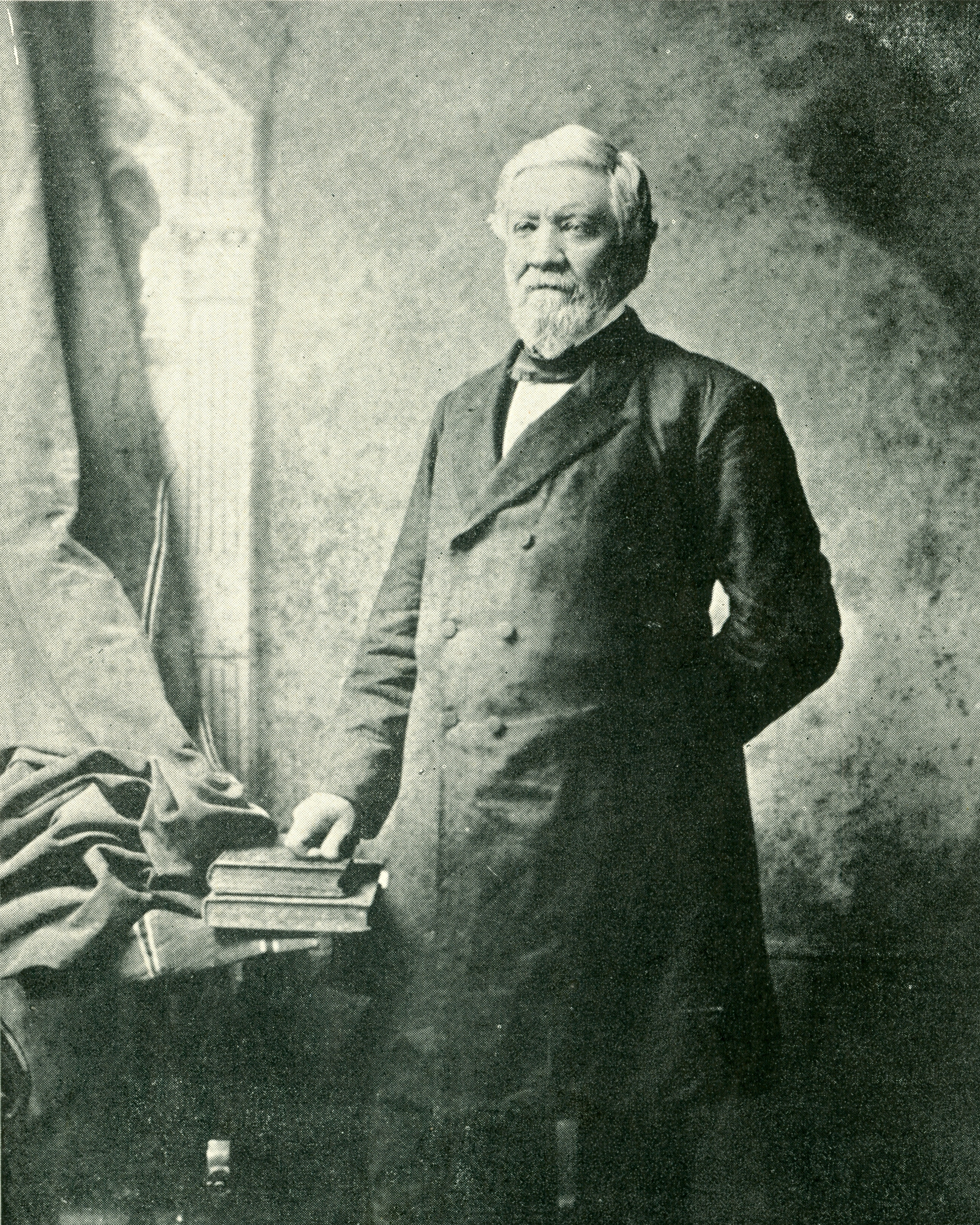

Member of the Virginia Senate from the 32nd district
- In office December 5, 1883 – July 23, 1888
- Preceded by: Joseph A. Wingfield
- Succeeded by: Henry T. Wickham

Member of the Confederate States House of Representatives from Virginia's 3rd district
- In office October 5, 1864 – May 10, 1865
- Preceded by: James Lyons
- Succeeded by: None (position eliminated)

Member of the Virginia Senate for Hanover and Henrico
- In office December 5, 1859 – December 2, 1861
- Preceded by: Chastain White
- Succeeded by: John R. Garnett

Member of the Virginia House of Delegates from Hanover County
- In office December 3, 1849 – December 2, 1850
- Preceded by: Richard F. Darracott
- Succeeded by: Chastain White

Personal details
- Born: September 21, 1820 Richmond, Virginia, U.S.
- Died: July 23, 1888 (aged 67) Richmond, Virginia, U.S.
- Party: Republican
- Spouse: Lucy Penn Taylor
- Relations: John Wickham (grandfather); Thomas Nelson Jr. (great-grandfather)
- Children: Henry T. Wickham
- Education: University of Virginia

Military service
- Allegiance: Confederate States
- Branch/service: Confederate States Army
- Years of service: 1861–1864
- Rank: Brigadier General
- Unit: 4th Virginia Cavalry
- Battles/wars: American Civil War; First Battle of Manassas; Battle of Williamsburg; Battle of Sharpsburg; Battle of Chancellorsville; Battle of Brandy Station; Gettysburg campaign Battle of Yellow Tavern; Valley Campaigns of 1864

Williams Carter Wickham (September 21, 1820 – July 23, 1888) was a Virginia lawyer and politician. A plantation owner who served in both houses of the Virginia General Assembly, Wickham also became a delegate to the Virginia Secession Convention of 1861, where he voted against secession, but after fellow delegates and voters approved secession, he joined the Confederate States Army and rose to the rank of cavalry general, then became a Confederate States Congressman near the end of the American Civil War. Later, Wickham became a Republican and helped rebuild Virginia's infrastructure after gaining control of the heavily damaged Virginia Central Railroad, which he repaired and helped merge into the Chesapeake and Ohio Railway company. Cooperating with financier Collis Huntington, Wickham developed coal resources and the Newport News Shipyard. He was also again elected to the Virginia Senate. His son Henry T. Wickham also became a lawyer and would work with his father and eventually twice become the speaker pro tempore of the Virginia Senate.

== Early and family life ==
Wickham was born in Richmond, Virginia, the son of William Fanning Wickham and Anne Butler (née Carter) Wickham. His paternal grandfather John Wickham was a prominent Richmond lawyer who had moved from New York state to Richmond following the American Revolutionary War. His great-grandfather had been an Anglican minister in New York state, so he had relatives there. On his mother's side, Wickham descended from the First Families of Virginia, specifically the Nelson and Carter families prominent in the Virginia Colony.

One of Wickham's maternal great-grandfathers, Gen. Thomas Nelson, Jr., had signed the Declaration of Independence as a Virginia delegate and served as governor of Virginia during the American Revolutionary War. Thomas "Scotch Tom" Nelson was one of the founders of Yorktown in the late 17th century. Wickham was also descended from Robert "King" Carter (1663–1732), who served as an acting royal governor of Virginia and was one of its wealthiest landowners (and largest slaveowners) in the late 17th and early 18th centuries. His mother was a first cousin of Robert E. Lee, whose mother Anne Hill (née Carter) Lee, was born at Shirley Plantation.

Wickham spent much of his youth at the 3,200-acre (13 km^{2}) plantation, Hickory Hill, located about 20 miles (32 km) north of Richmond and 5 miles (8.0 km) east of Ashland in Hanover County. Hickory Hill was long an outlying appendage to Shirley Plantation, much of it having come into possession of the Carter family by a deed dated March 2, 1734.

Wickham received a private education appropriate to his class, then traveled to Charlottesville for further studies. He graduated from the University of Virginia.

He married Lucy Penn Taylor and had several children, including Henry T. Wickam discussed below who followed his father's legal and political career path.

== Career ==
Admitted to the Virginia bar in 1842, Wickham had a private legal practice, as well as operating plantations acquired through his marriage and using the profits of his legal practice. Meanwhile, his father W.F. Wickham continued to operate Hickory Hill, which was one of the two largest plantations in Hanover County, and with over 200 enslaved people by 1860, among the largest in the state, even though it raised comparatively little tobacco. W.C. Wickham became a local justice in Hanover County. Hanover County voters elected Wickham to the Virginia House of Delegates in 1849 (although he only served a single term) and together with Henrico county voters, elected him to the Virginia Senate a decade later.

In 1858, as planters responded to John Brown's raid on Harpers Ferry, Wickham recruited a cavalry company in Hanover County, the "Hanover Dragoons" and accepted a commission as captain of Virginia volunteer militia.

In 1861 Henrico County voters elected Wickham as one of their delegates to the Virginia Secession Convention of 1861. A Unionist, Wickham twice voted against the articles of secession.

== Civil War ==
General Wickham

Following Virginia voters' approval of secession, Wickham took his company, the Hanover Dragoons, into the Confederate States Army. After participating in the First Battle of Manassas, Wickham was commissioned by Governor John Letcher as lieutenant colonel of the Fourth Virginia Cavalry in September 1861. On May 4, 1862, he incurred a severe saber wound during a cavalry charge at the Battle of Williamsburg and was captured while recovering at Hickory Hill, but quickly paroled.

In August 1862, Wickham received a promotion to Colonel of the Fourth Virginia Cavalry. At the Battle of Sharpsburg, he was wounded again, this time in the neck by a shell fragment. Recovering, he participated in the battles of Chancellorsville and Brandy Station and the Gettysburg campaign. General Wade Hampton blamed the failures of Wickham's Fourth Virginia Cavalry at Brandy Station in June 1863 for the death of his brother, Lt. Col. Frank Hampton.

Despite Hampton's enmity, following the Battle of Gettysburg, Wickham was promoted to brigadier general on September 9, 1863, and put in command of what became known as Wickham's brigade of Fitzhugh Lee's division. Leading up the Bristoe Campaign, Wickham was injured in a fall from his horse.

On May 11, 1864, he fought at the Battle of Yellow Tavern. Maj. Gen. J.E.B. Stuart was mortally wounded during this engagement, with his final order being: "Order Wickham to dismount his brigade and attack." In September 1864, after the Confederate defeat at the Battle of Fisher's Hill, Wickham blocked at Milford an attempt by Maj. Gen. Philip Sheridan to encircle and destroy the Confederate forces of Maj. Gen. Jubal Early. Wickham then attacked the Federal cavalry at Waynesboro and forced them to retreat to Bridgewater.

Wickham resigned his commission on October 5, 1864, and took his seat in the Second Confederate Congress, to which he had been elected while in the field. Recognizing that the days of the Confederacy were over, he participated in the Hampton Roads Conference in an attempt to bring an early end to the war.

== Postbellum activities ==
After the Confederacy surrendered, Wickham used his family's New York connections to reorganize Virginia's economy, which had been ruined by the war. He ultimately became a Republican and voted in 1872 for General Ulysses S. Grant as a member of the Electoral College from Virginia.

In November 1865, Wickham became president of the Virginia Central Railroad, which had been one of the most heavily damaged during the War. In 1868, the Virginia Central merged with the Covington and Ohio Railroad to form the new Chesapeake and Ohio Railroad, and Wickham became the new company's president. He worked to complete a railroad line to the Ohio River, long a dream of Virginians. However, unlike fellow Confederate officer and railroad leader William Mahone, Wickham was initially unable to secure capital or financing in Virginia, or from Europeans.

Turning to New York City, Wickham worked with an investment group headed by Collis P. Huntington. Fresh from recent completion of the western portion of the U.S. transcontinental railroad as a member of the so-called "Big Four", Huntington became the C&O's new president. His contacts and reputation helped obtain $15 million of funding from New York financiers for the project, which eventually cost $23 million to complete. The final spike ceremony for the 428-mile (689 km) long line from Richmond to the Ohio River was held on January 29, 1873 at Hawk's Nest railroad bridge in the New River Valley, near the town of Ansted in Fayette County, West Virginia.

After Huntington assumed the presidency, Wickham remained with the C&O as vice-president from 1869 to 1878, when the company went into foreclosure following a national panic, with Wickham as receiver. In 1878 the C&O was reorganized as the Chesapeake and Ohio Railway Company, with Collis P. Huntington assuming the office of President of the reorganized road; Wickham became second vice-president. Under their leadership, an additional line was extended east from Richmond through the new Church Hill Tunnel and down the Virginia Peninsula through Williamsburg to reach coal piers located on the harbor Hampton Roads, the East Coast of the United States' largest ice-free port at the small unincorporated town of Newport News in Warwick County. Before the war, the Gosport Shipyard in Portsmouth had served the U.S. Navy, and then the Confederate Navy until Federal forces gained control of the Hampton Roads area, so skilled labor was available. During the ten years from 1878 to 1888, the C&O also developed coal resources in the Appalachians and shipped them eastward. Coal became a staple of the C&O's business at that time, and still was over 125 years later under successor CSX Transportation. Huntington developed his holdings in Newport News, founding the Newport News Shipbuilding and Drydock Company and helped the small community become one of only two in Virginia to become an independent city without first having been an incorporated town. In modern times, Newport News, which merged with the former Warwick County in 1958, has grown to become one of the major cities of Hampton Roads.

Throughout the years after the Civil War, while developing railroads (and remaining an officer of the C&O), Wickham continued active in politics. He maintained an office in Richmond even while officially residing in Hanover County. He was elected chairman of the Hanover County, Virginia, Board of Supervisors in 1871. In 1883, Hanover County voters (this time together with Caroline County voters) again elected as Wickham to the Virginia Senate (still a part-time position), and re-elected him in 1887.

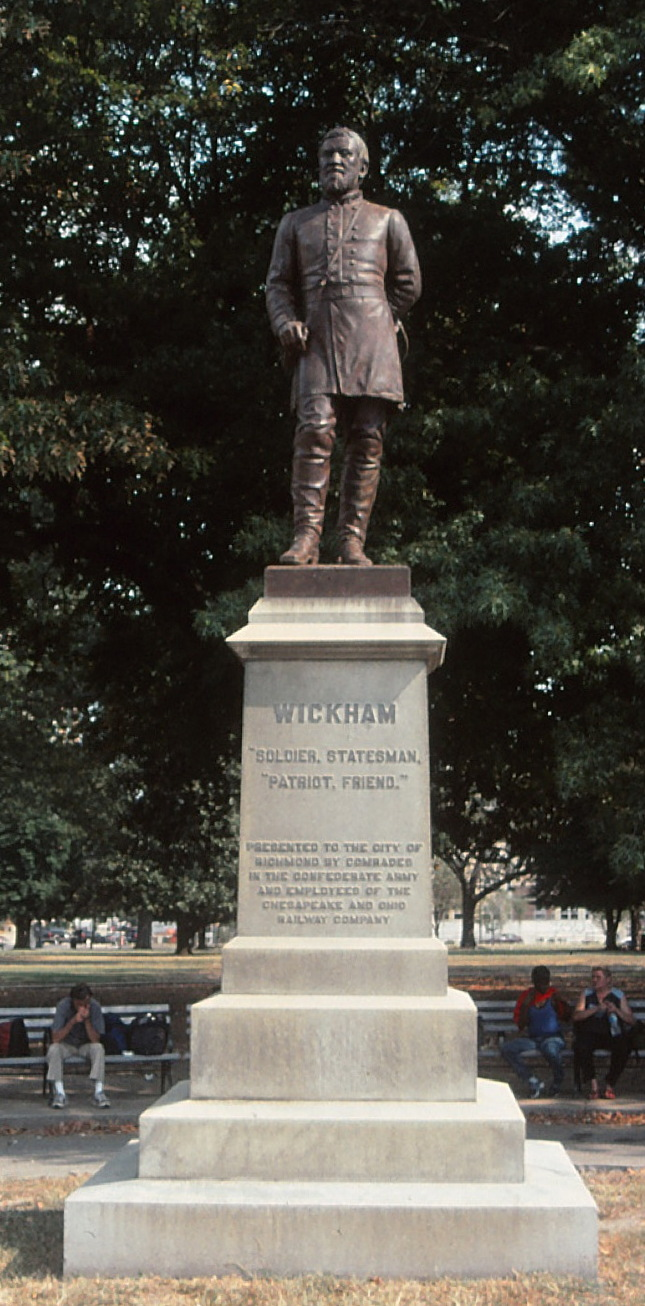
Statue of Williams Carter Wickham sculpted by Edward V. Valentine and placed in Monroe Park

== Death and legacy ==
Wickham died of heart failure on July 23, 1888, at his Richmond office, and was interred in Hickory Hill Cemetery in Hanover County near Ashland. Not long after Wickham's death, employees of the Chesapeake and Ohio Railway, "all of whom were sincerely devoted to the deceased, whose memory they tenderly cherish and revere," initiated an effort to erect a bronze statue in his memory. As of September 1889, a committee consisting of ex-Senator John Callahan, C.T. Dabney, W.B. Waldron, E.C. Meredith, and W.J. Binford partnered with sculptor Edward V. Valentine to create and erect a statue of Williams Carter Wickham so as to "perpetuate the heroic life and gallant deeds of the late Gen. William C. Wickham." The general's comrades and C&O employees gave a statue of Williams Carter Wickham to the City of Richmond in 1891, which was placed in Monroe Park. Two of the general's descendants, Clayton and Will Wickham, called for the statue's removal in the aftermath of Charlottesville, Virginia's 2017 Unite the Right rally, and participants in 2020's George Floyd protests defaced and toppled the statue from its pedestal.

== See also ==
- Hotchkiss, Jed (1899). "Virginia". In Evans, Clement A. (ed.). Confederate Military History: A Library of Confederate States History. Vol. 3. Atlanta: Confederate Publishing Company. OCLC 833588 – via Archive.org.
- Eicher, John H.; Eicher, David J. (2001). Civil War High Commands. Stanford: Stanford University Press. ISBN 978-0-8047-3641-1.
- Sifakis, Stewart (1988). Who Was Who in the Civil War. New York: Facts On File. ISBN 978-0-8160-1055-4.
- Warner, Ezra J. (1959). Generals in Gray: Lives of the Confederate Commanders (1st ed.). Baton Rouge: Louisiana State University Press. OCLC 445052.
- "Brigadier General Williams Carter Wickham". The Virginia Civil War Home Page. Archived from the original on July 15, 2007.

Virginia House of Delegates
| Preceded by Richard F. Darracott | Virginia Delegate for Hanover County; 1849–1850 | Succeeded by Chastain White |
Confederate States House of Representatives
| Preceded by James Lyons | C.S.A. Representative from Virginia's 3rd Congressional District; 1863–1865 | Succeeded by None |
Senate of Virginia
| Preceded by Unknown | Virginia Senator for Hanover and Caroline; 1859–1861 | Succeeded by John R. Garnett |
| Preceded by Joseph A. Wingfield | Virginia Senator for Hanover and Henrico; 1883–1888 | Succeeded by Henry T. Wickham |
