= Martin's Tavern =

Restaurant in Washington, D.C.

Coordinates: 38°54′24.3″N 77°3′47.6″W

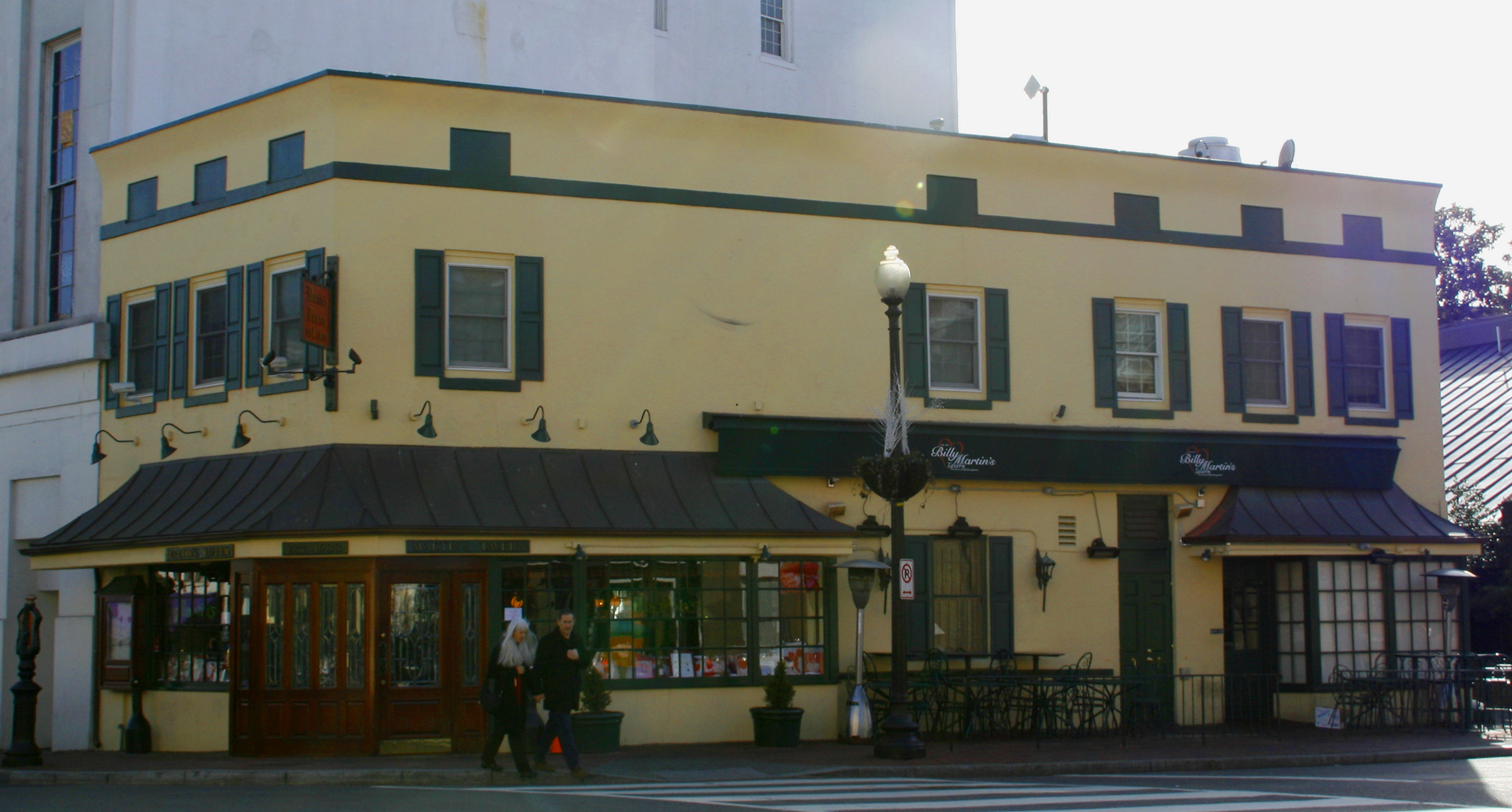
Exterior of the tavern in February 2009

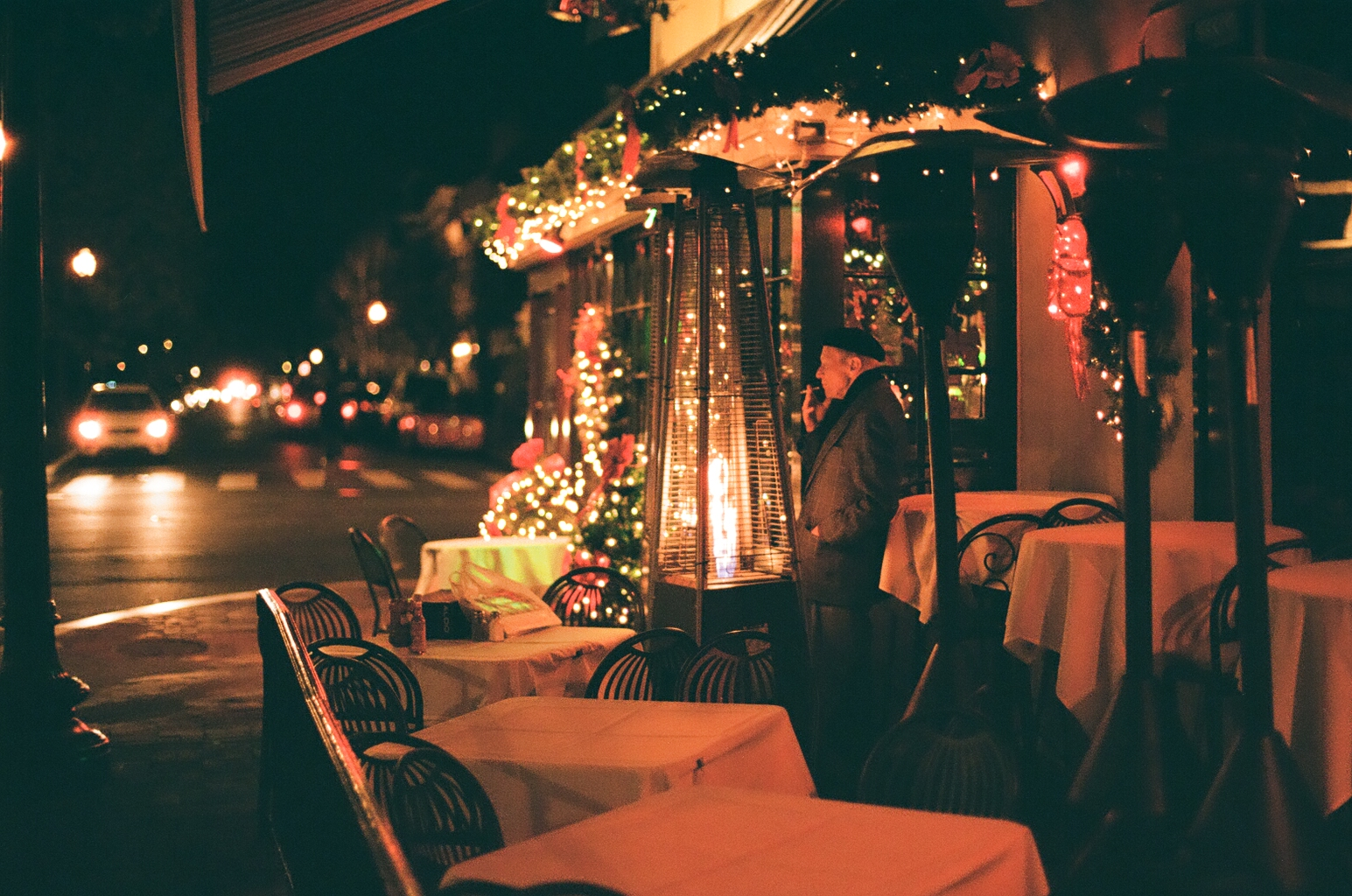
Exterior of the tavern at night in December 2015

Martin's Tavern is a family-owned restaurant in the Georgetown neighborhood of Washington, D.C. Founded in 1933, it is the oldest family-owned restaurant in Washington, D.C.

== History ==
=== 20th century ===
In 1933, Martin's Tavern was founded by former Major League Baseball player Billy Martin. It is located at 1264 Wisconsin Avenue NW, in the Georgetown neighborhood of Washington D.C.

The tavern has hosted each U.S. President from Harry S. Truman to George W. Bush.

On June 24, 1953, then U.S. Senator John F. Kennedy proposed to Jacqueline Kennedy Onassis, his future wife.

=== 21st century ===
In April 2020, Martin's Tavern appeared on the Cooking Channel show Man v. Food in a Washington, D.C.–based episode.
