= Edward Virginius Valentine =

American sculptor (1838–1930)

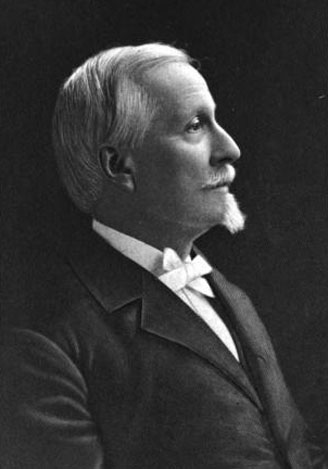
- Valentine in a 1906 publication
- Born: November 12, 1838
- Died: October 19, 1930 (aged 91); Richmond, Virginia, U.S.
- Resting place: Hollywood Cemetery
- Occupation: Sculptor
- Spouses: Alice Churchill Robinson (m. 1872; died 1883) Katherine Cole Friend Mayo (m. 1892; died 1927)

Edward Virginius Valentine (November 12, 1838 – October 19, 1930) was an American sculptor from Richmond, Virginia.

== Early life and education ==
Edward Virginius Valentine was born on November 12, 1838, in Richmond, Virginia, to Elizabeth (née Mosby) and Mann Satterwhite Valentine. In 1853, he attended the Exhibition of the Industry of All Nations in New York City where he saw August Kiss's Amazon Attacked by a Panther sculpture exhibited. The sculpture influenced Valentine to pursue a career in drawing and modeling. At the age of 18, he attended the Medical College of Virginia and he took anatomical studies and drew from plaster casts. In September 1859, he sailed to Europe. He studied in Paris with Thomas Couture and François Jouffroy, in Florence, Italy, under Bonanti, and with August Kiss in Berlin. He received a Doctor of Laws from Washington and Lee University.

== Career ==
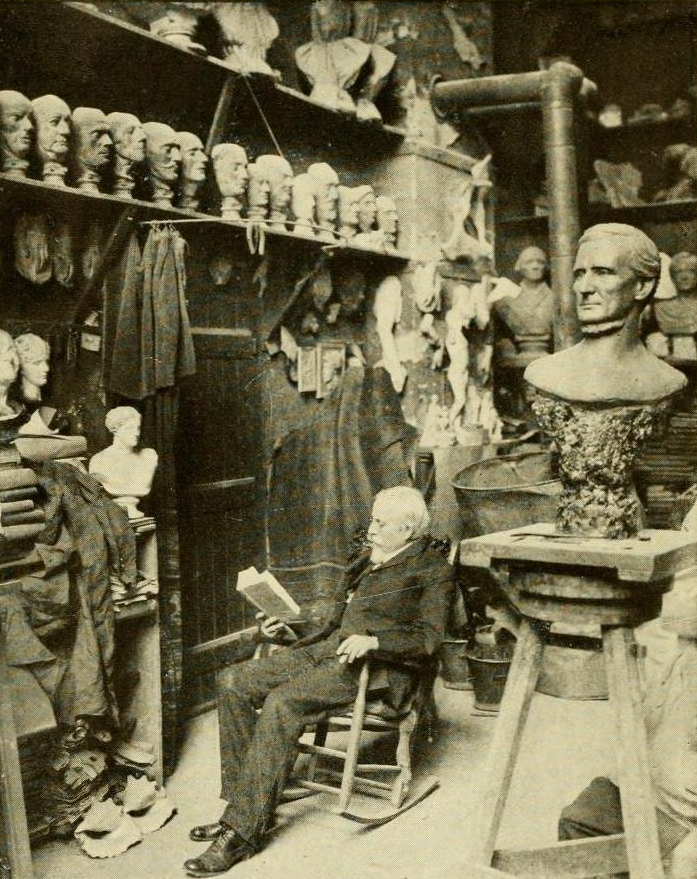
Valentine's studio, c. 1923

In 1865, Valentine returned to Richmond and opened a studio.

He briefly headed the Valentine Richmond History Center, which was founded by his brother, Mann S. Valentine Jr. The Wickham-Valentine House, part of the Valentine Museum in Richmond is on the National Register of Historic Places and was named for him and his brother.

== Personal life ==
Valentine married Alice Churchill Robinson on November 12, 1872. She died in 1883. He married Katherine Cole (née Friend) Mayo in 1892. She died in 1927. They had no children. Valentine was friends with French artist Charles Hoffbauer.

Valentine died on October 19, 1930, at his home in Richmond, Virginia. He was buried at Hollywood Cemetery.

== Works ==
- Recumbent Lee, marble, Lexington, Virginia, 1875
- Stonewall Jackson Monument, bronze. Lexington Virginia, 1891
- Matthew Fontaine Maury bronze, 1869
- Statue of Williams Carter Wickham, bronze. Monroe Park, Richmond, Virginia, 1891, toppled June 2020
- General Hugh Mercer Monument, Washington Avenue Historic District, 1906
- Robert E. Lee, Virginia Museum of History & Culture of the Virginia Historical Society, Richmond, Virginia, 1909. It was removed from the United States Capitol, Washington D.C. in 2020.
- Thomas Jefferson, marble, Jefferson Hotel, Richmond, Virginia, 1894
- Andromache and Astyanax, Richmond, Virginia
- Jefferson Davis Memorial, bronze, Richmond, Virginia, 1907, and New Orleans, Louisiana, 1911
- John James Audubon, bronze, New Orleans, Louisiana, 1910
