= Hugh Clopton =

Lord Mayor of London, 1491–1492

Sir Hugh Clopton
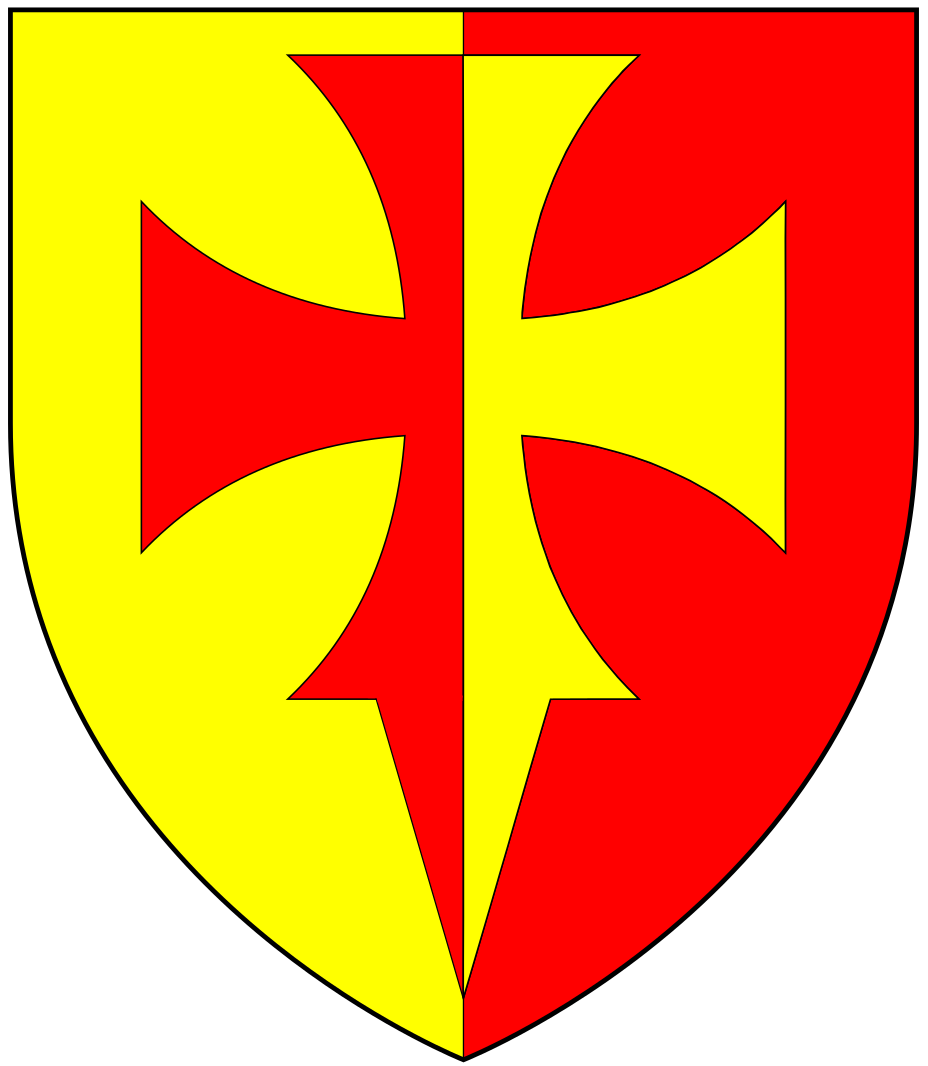
- Arms of Clopton of Clopton, in the parish of Stratford-upon-Avon, Warwickshire: Per pale or and gules, a cross patée fitchée counterchanged. As seen on the monument to George Carew, 1st Earl of Totnes (1555–1629), and his wife Joyce Clopton (died 1637) in the Church of the Holy Trinity, Stratford-upon-Avon

Lord Mayor of London
- In office 1491–1492
- Preceded by: John Matthew
- Succeeded by: William Martyn

Personal details
- Born: 1430 Clopton House, Warwickshire, England
- Died: 15 September 1500 (aged 69–70) St Margaret Lothbury, London, England

Sir Hugh Clopton (c. 1440 – 15 September 1496) was a Lord Mayor of London, a member of the Worshipful Company of Mercers and a benefactor of his home town of Stratford-upon-Avon in Warwickshire.

== Origins ==
Hugh Clopton was born in about 1440 at Clopton House near Stratford-upon-Avon, where the Clopton family had lived since the reign of King Henry III (1216–1272). He was a younger son of John Clopton by his wife, a certain Agnes whose surname is unknown. In 1450 his father received license to erect an oratory at the manor house. In 1474 Thomas Clopton, Hugh's elder brother, obtained permission from Pope Sixtus IV to add a chapel to the house for the celebration of divine service.

== Career ==
As a younger son excluded from his patrimony by primogeniture, he was expected to make his own fortune and left Clopton for the City of London at an early age, where he was apprenticed in 1457 to the mercer John Roo, and was admitted to the Worshipful Company of Mercers in 1464. He served as Warden of the Company three times, in 1479, 1484 and 1488. On 15 October 1485 he was chosen as Alderman for Dowgate ward. In 1486 he was elected Sheriff of London during Sir Henry Colet's term as mayor, and was himself chosen Lord Mayor of London in 1491. By 1495 he was living in Bread Street. Although some biographers have stated that he was knighted, this does not appear to have been the case as he described himself in his will merely as "citizen, mercer and alderman".

His vast fortune enabled him to become possessed of his ancestral estates at Clopton, the inheritance of his elder brother, and it is certain that the neighbouring town of Stratford-upon-Avon was his favourite place of residence. In about 1483 he erected there (in Chapel Street) "a pretty house of brick and timber", which was later purchased in 1597 and renovated by the playwright William Shakespeare, and under the name of New Place served as his residence until his death in 1616.

Clopton rebuilt the nave of the Chapel of the Stratford Guild of the Holy Trinity, situated opposite his new house in Chapel Street, and he adorned the building with a tower, steeple, glass windows and paintings for the ceiling. He also built the Clopton Bridge, a remarkably fine stone bridge of fourteen arches over the River Avon, having removed at his own expense an old wooden bridge on the site. He also founded the Clopton chantry chapel in the Church of the Holy Trinity, Stratford-upon-Avon, still notable features of modern Stratford.

== Death and burial ==
He died on 15 September 1497, holding the manor of Clopton as a tenant-in-chief of King Henry VII "as of the manor of the Castle of Beaudesert" by 1/8 of a knight's fee, and left as his heir William Clopton (died 1521), the son of his nephew John, then aged 15. In 1504 William had livery of his great-uncle Hugh's manors of Clopton and Little Wilmcote, and his lands in Stratford and Bridgetown.

By his will, dated a week before his death, he provided for the completion of the Stratford improvements, and left a hundred marks to twenty-four maidens of the town and £200 for rebuilding the cross aisle of the parish church. He also instituted exhibitions of £4 a year each for five years for three poor scholars at each university of Oxford and Cambridge, and gave £10 to the common box of the Mercers Company, and other sums to the Venturers fellowship resident in Zeland, Brabant, and Flanders, and to "the fellowship of the Staple of Calais".

Clopton desired to be buried in the parish church of Stratford, if he died in that town, where he spent much time in his later years. Instead, he died in his London house, in the parish of St Margaret Lothbury, and he finally bequeathed his body to the church of that parish.

== Succession ==
Clopton never married and left no children. The Clopton estates ultimately passed to Joyce Clopton, of the sixth generation in descent from Thomas Clopton, Sir Hugh's elder brother. She married George Carew, 1st Earl of Totnes, who thus inherited from his wife the manor of Clopton, and was buried in Stratford Church, where survives his magnificent monument containing the effigies of himself and his wife.

== Notes ==
Civic offices
Preceded by John Mathew	Lord Mayor of the City of London; 1491-1491	Succeeded by Sir William Martyn
