= William Martin (Athelhampton) =

Sir William Martin of Athelhampton, near Dorchester, Dorset (c. 1446 – 24 March 1503/4) was MP for Dorset in 1478. William Martin was the son and heir of Thomas Martin of Athelhampton, and his wife Elizabeth Clevedon. He built the current Great Hall of Athelhampton in or around 1485. He also received licence to enclose 160 acres (647,000 m^{2}) of deer park and licence to fortify his manor.

== Family and legacy ==
William Martin married twice. He first married Isolde or Isabel Farrington, who had a son with him, Christopher Martin. He then married Christina or Christian Paulet, who had a son Richard Martin and daughter Elizabeth Martyn with him. Elizabeth Martyn married John Carew.

He died in 1504, and was buried at nearby St Mary the Virgin, Puddletown, where effigies of him and his family can still be seen.

He has sometimes been conflated (e.g. in "An Inventory of the Historical Monuments in Dorset, Volume 3, Central. Her Majesty's Stationery Office, London, 1970") with another Sir William Martyn, who was Lord Mayor of London around the same time.
