= Will Martin (economist) =

Australian economist

- Born: Brisbane, QLD, Australia

Academic background
- Education: University of Queensland; Australian National University; Iowa State University

Academic work
- Discipline: Agricultural economics, International trade
- Institutions: International Food Policy Research Institute (IFPRI); World Bank (former)
- Awards: Fellow, Agricultural & Applied Economics Association (2021); Distinguished Fellow, Australasian Agricultural and Resource Economics Society (2009); Honorary Life Member, International Association of Agricultural Economists

Will Martin is an Australian economist who researches agricultural economics, international trade policy, and global food security. He is a Senior Research Fellow at the International Food Policy Research Institute (IFPRI) and previously worked at the World Bank for 24 years.

== Early life and education ==
Martin grew up on a family dairy farm in Queensland.

He earned a Bachelor of Agricultural Science from the University of Queensland in 1975 and a Bachelor of Economics from the Australian National University in 1979. He completed his graduate studies at Iowa State University, receiving a Master of Science in Agricultural Economics in 1981 and a Ph.D. in Economics in 1982.

== Career ==
Martin began his career in 1975 as a Research Officer and Assistant Director at the Bureau of Agricultural Economics in Canberra.

In 1991, he joined the World Bank, serving in roles such as Lead Economist for Trade in the Development Research Group and Research Manager for Agriculture and Rural Development. His work at the World Bank included analyzing the Uruguay Round, the Doha Development Agenda, and China's accession to the World Trade Organization (WTO).

Martin served as President of the International Association of Agricultural Economists (IAAE) from 2015 to 2018. Since 2015, he has been a Senior Research Fellow at IFPRI in Washington, D.C.

== Research ==
Martin's research analyzes trade barriers, agricultural subsidies, and the effect of food prices on populations in low-income countries.

In 2008, The Economist cited research by Martin and Maros Ivanic regarding the impact of rising staple food costs on global poverty levels. This data was subsequently utilized by World Bank President Robert Zoellick to advocate for international action on food security. The Financial Times has also cited analysis by Martin and Kym Anderson regarding WTO negotiations and farm trade liberalization.

His work is widely cited within the field of economics, with over 21,000 citations and an h-index of 73 as of May 2026. The IDEAS/RePEc database ranks him among the top 10% of agricultural economists globally.

== Awards and recognition ==
- 2009: Distinguished Fellow, Australasian Agricultural and Resource Economics Society (AARES)
- 2016: Inductee, Global Trade Analysis Project (GTAP) Hall of Fame
- 2021: Fellow, Agricultural & Applied Economics Association (AAEA)
- Honorary Life Member, International Association of Agricultural Economists (IAAE)

== Selected publications ==
Books

- Gautam, M.; Gautam, D. Laborde; et al. (2022). Repurposing Agricultural Policies and Support: Options to Transform Agriculture and Food Systems to Better Serve the Health of People, Economies, and the Planet. Washington, DC: IFPRI and World Bank. doi:10.2499/9780896294379 (inactive 22 January 2026).
- Anderson, K.; Martin, W., eds. (2006). Agricultural Trade Reform and the Doha Development Agenda. New York and Washington, DC: Palgrave Macmillan and the World Bank. ISBN 978-0-8213-6239-6.
- Bhattasali, D.; Li, Shantong; Martin, W., eds. (2004). China and the WTO: Accession, Policy Reform, and Poverty Reduction. Washington, DC: Oxford University Press and the World Bank. ISBN 978-0821353233.
- Martin, W.; Winters, L.A., eds. (1996). The Uruguay Round and the Developing Countries. Cambridge: Cambridge University Press. ISBN 978-0521572354.

Journal articles

- Laborde, D.; Martin, W.; Swinnen, J.; Vos, R. (2020). "COVID-19 risks to global food security". Science. 369 (6503): 500–502. Bibcode:2020Sci...369..500L. doi:10.1126/science.abc4765. hdl:10568/142897. PMID 32732407.
- Laborde, D.; Mamun, A.; Martin, W.; et al. (2021). "Agricultural subsidies and global greenhouse gas emissions". Nature Communications. 12 (1): 2601. Bibcode:2021NatCo..12.2601L. doi:10.1038/s41467-021-22703-1. PMC 8110782. PMID 33972533.
- Ivanic, M.; Martin, W. (2008). "Implications of higher global food prices for poverty in low-income countries". Agricultural Economics. 39 (s1): 405–416. doi:10.1111/j.1574-0862.2008.00344.x.
- Martin, W.; Anderson, K. (2012). "Export restrictions and price insulation during commodity price booms". American Journal of Agricultural Economics. 94 (2): 422–427. doi:10.1093/ajae/aar084.
- Martin, W.; Mitra, D. (2001). "Productivity growth and convergence in agriculture and manufacturing". Economic Development and Cultural Change. 49 (2): 403–422. doi:10.1086/452504.
