= Bill Martin (museum director) =

American museum director

William J. Martin
- Born: 1954; Brandy Station, Virginia, U.S.
- Died: December 28, 2025 (aged 71); Richmond, Virginia, U.S.
- Occupation: Museum director
- Known for: The Valentine

William J. Martin (1954 – December 28, 2025) was an American public historian and longtime director of the Valentine. Under his leadership, the museum survived a financial crisis and served as a mainstay of Richmond, Virginia's historical scene.

== Early life ==
Martin grew up in Brandy Station, Culpeper County. He credited his parents and grandmother with fostering his love of history. Martin attended Virginia Tech, where he received a bachelor's degree in urban studies and a master's degree in public administration. While a student at Virginia Tech, he was a founding member of the university's Gay Student Union in 1975.

== Career ==
Martin's career began with stints at the Okefenokee Heritage Center and at Southern Forest World, two Georgia museums, as well as a stint as the director of the Jacksonville Arts and Sciences Museum. In 1987, Martin was hired by the city of Petersburg, Virginia as director of the city's museums and tourism. Martin was serving in that capacity during the 1993 Virginia tornado outbreak which devastated the city's historic downtown.

In 1994, Martin joined the Valentine as director of marketing and public relations. The Valentine had recently attempted to open an extension, Valentine Riverside at the Tredegar Iron Works, an expensive and unpopular attraction which closed within 16 months. Martin's leadership steered the Valentine through near financial ruin; he was soon named the museum's director.

During his tenure, the Valentine grappled with the ideology of the Lost Cause and its influence on Richmond history, particularly with regard to the statues on Monument Avenue. Following the 2020 protests in Richmond, Martin displayed the statue of Jefferson Davis which was formerly located on Monument Avenue, on loan from the Black History Museum and Cultural Center of Virginia. He had been determined to do so since the 2017 Unite the Right rally and subsequent violence in Charlottesville, Virginia. The statue, which had been designed by Edward Virginius Valentine, was put on display in an unrestored state, toppled to the ground and covered with paint by protesters.

The Valentine Studio at the museum, formerly used by Edward Virginius Valentine, was renovated to dissect Lost Cause ideology under the title "Sculpting History at the Valentine Studio." The Valentine also held the archives of Style Weekly magazine.

Martin was a steadfast supporter of local historical and cultural organizations, including the JXN Project and the Afrikana Film Festival. His mentoring of younger public historians led him to be fondly nicknamed the "museum dean." Style Weekly named him Richmonder of the Year in 2024. He served on the inaugural advisory board for GayRVA, the first online news outlet for Virginia's LGBTQ community.

== Death ==
On December 27, 2025, Martin was fatally injured when he was struck by a car at a crosswalk on East Broad Street. He died of his injuries the following day.

Mayor Danny Avula called his death a "tremendous loss for our community," stating that "Bill was a Richmond icon, an historian who worked tirelessly to tell Richmond's stories in new and lasting ways, with a particular passion for telling the fullness of our City's complex history, but always pointing us forward." On January 8, Mayor Avula announced an inquiry to improve pedestrian safety after the death of six pedestrians in three weeks.

Governor-elect Abigail Spanberger, following Martin's death, praised Martin as one who "exemplified the best of Virginia — developing a deep knowledge of our past and determining how it can inform our future." Senator Tim Kaine wrote on Twitter that "no one was more dedicated to fostering a deep understanding of Virginia's complicated history than Bill Martin."

Jennifer McClellan, representative for Virginia's 4th congressional district, eulogized Martin with the statement: "Bill and I shared a passion for telling a complete history of Richmond and our Commonwealth, even when it was uncomfortable. His passion and joy for his work and community was infectious. While his legacy will live on in the stories he brought to light, he will be dearly missed."

Sesha Joi Moon, co-founder of the JXN Project, stated of Martin that "he stood in the gap for so many — helping to connect some of the very most complicated corners of the city through arts, culture, and history."
