= Wickham House =

Historic house in Virginia, United States

- Wickham-Valentine House
- U.S. National Register of Historic Places
- U.S. National Historic Landmark
- Virginia Landmarks Register
- Richmond City Historic District
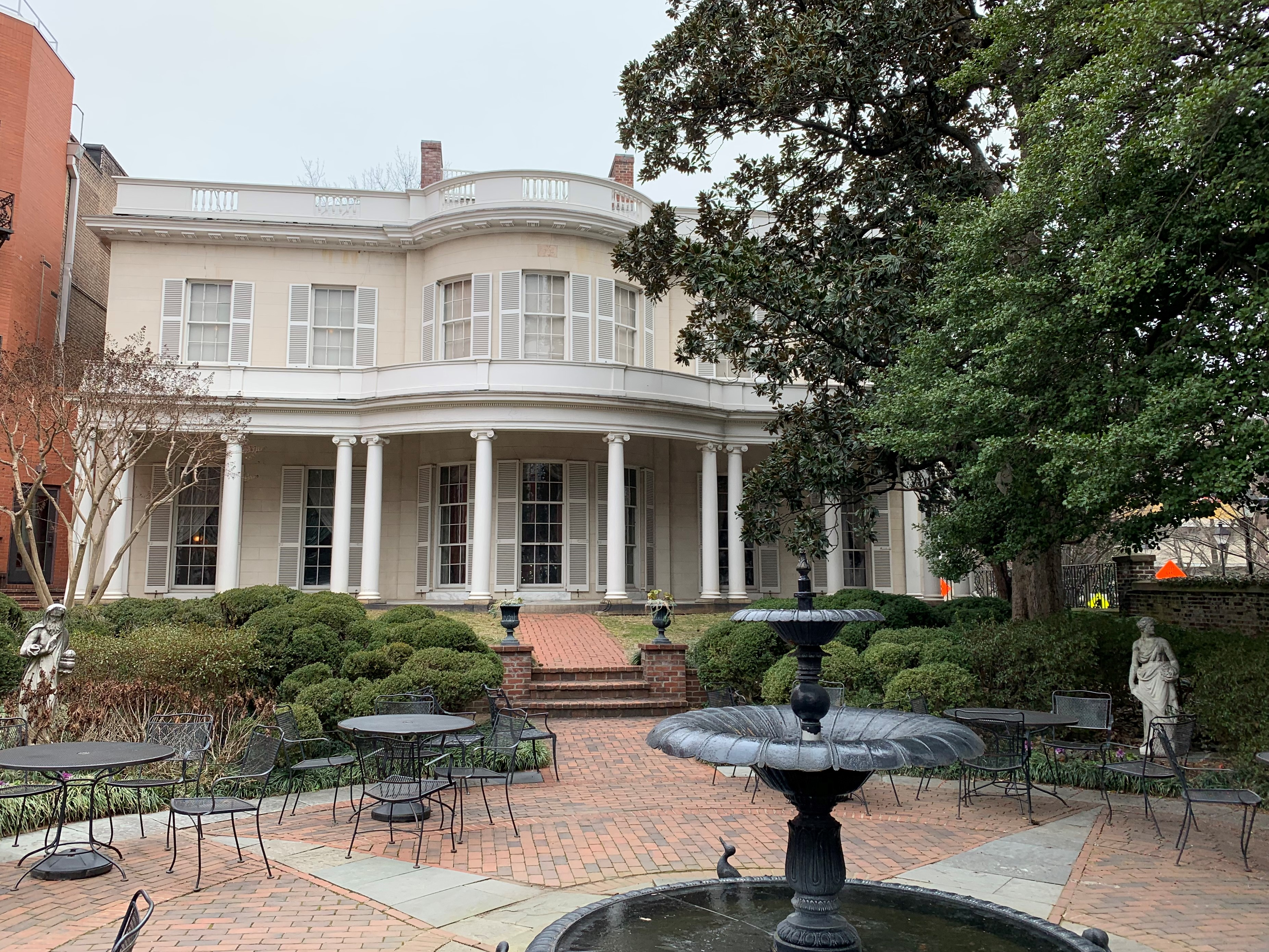
- The Wickham House in 2019

- Location within Virginia Location within the United States
- Location: 1015 E. Clay St., Richmond, Virginia
- Coordinates: 37°32′30″N 77°25′52″W
- Area: less than one acre
- Built: 1812
- Architectural style: Greek Revival, Late Victorian, Federal
- NRHP reference No.: 69000329
- VLR No.: 127-0020

Significant dates
- Added to NRHP: June 11, 1969
- Designated NHL: November 11, 1971
- Designated VLR: November 5, 1968

The Wickham House, also known as the Wickham-Valentine House, is a historic house museum on East Clay Street in Richmond, Virginia. Completed in 1812, it is considered one of the finest examples of architecture from the Federal period. It was designated a National Historic Landmark in 1971.

It is now owned and operated by The Valentine, a private history museum devoted to the city's history.

== Description and history ==
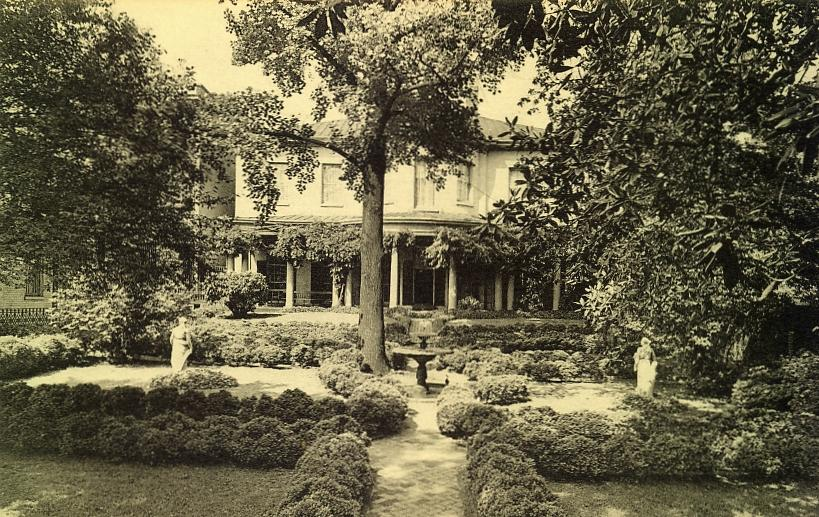
The Wickham House in c. 1920

The Wickham House is located in Richmond's Court End neighborhood, a few blocks north of the Virginia State Capitol on the south side of East Clay Street at its corner with North 11th Street. Immediately to its west is the main gallery space of The Valentine.

The house is a two-story brick structure, covered by a shallow hip roof surrounded by a low balustrade. The exterior walls have been finished in stucco scored to resemble ashlar stone. It is three bays wide, with a slightly projecting central bay. The main entrance is set in a segmented-arch opening with flanking sidelights and a semi-oval transom, and is sheltered by a portico supported by paired columns and topped by a balustrade. Windows are tri-part with narrow sections flanking wider ones; the ground-floor windows are set in recessed panels with blind segmented-arch headers. The interior features a magnificent elliptical staircase and neoclassical wallpaintings with ancient Greek, Roman and Egyptian themes.

The house was built in 1812 for John Wickham to a design by Massachusetts architect Alexander Parris. It has also been attributed to Robert Mills and Benjamin Latrobe. Wickham was a successful attorney who defended Vice President Aaron Burr during his trial for treason. The Victorian-era decorations found in its parlor were commissioned by John Ballard, its second owner.

In 1882 it was purchased by Mann Valentine II. He filled the house with artifacts, including some taken from excavations of Native American earthwork mounds in the Southeast, including South Appalachian Mississippian culture sites and historic Cherokee towns in North Carolina. He bequeathed them and the house to establish a museum for the city.

The house is now managed by The Valentine, the current name of original Valentine Museum. It is open for tours.

== See also ==
- List of National Historic Landmarks in Virginia
- National Register of Historic Places listings in Richmond, Virginia
