= William Martyn (Lord Mayor) =

Sir William Martyn

Lord Mayor of London
- In office 1492–1492
- Preceded by: Hugh Clopton
- Succeeded by: Sir Ralph Astley

Personal details
- Born: Hertfordshire, England

Sir William Martyn (Martin) (d. 1504) of Athelhampton, was Alderman, Sheriff of London in 1484 and Lord Mayor of London in 1492, representing the Skinners. He was made KB.

On January 6, 1494, he received the honour of knighthood from Henry VII.

Sir William was twice married. His first wife was Isabel, daughter of Thomas Farringdon. The second wife of Sir William was Christian, daughter of Sir William Poulett, of Hinton Saint George, and through this alliance came a line of Martins which were intimately connected with Somerset and Devonshire. Sir William was Sheriff of Somerset in 1490 and 1501.

Sir William was known to have a pet monkey, and is buried at the Chapel of Saint Mary Magdalene in Puddleton Church.

Crest: On the stump of a tree couped and eradicated Proper, a monkey sejant collared and lined Or holding in the dexter paw a mirror.

Civic offices
Preceded by Hugh Clopton	Lord Mayor of the City of London; 1492	Succeeded by Sir Ralph Astley
