= William Martin (painter) =

English painter

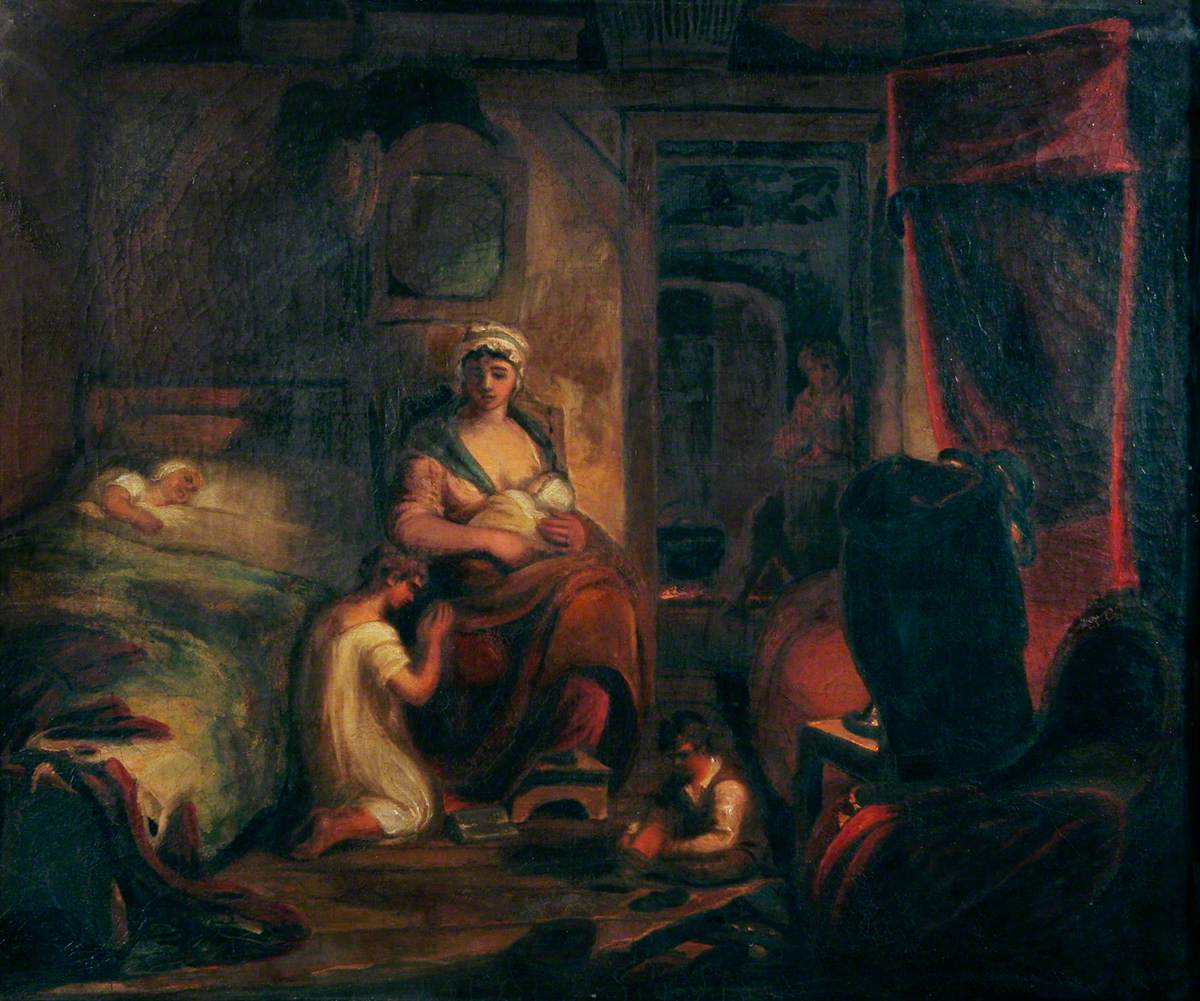
Interior of an English Cottage with Children Going to Bed (c. 1827)

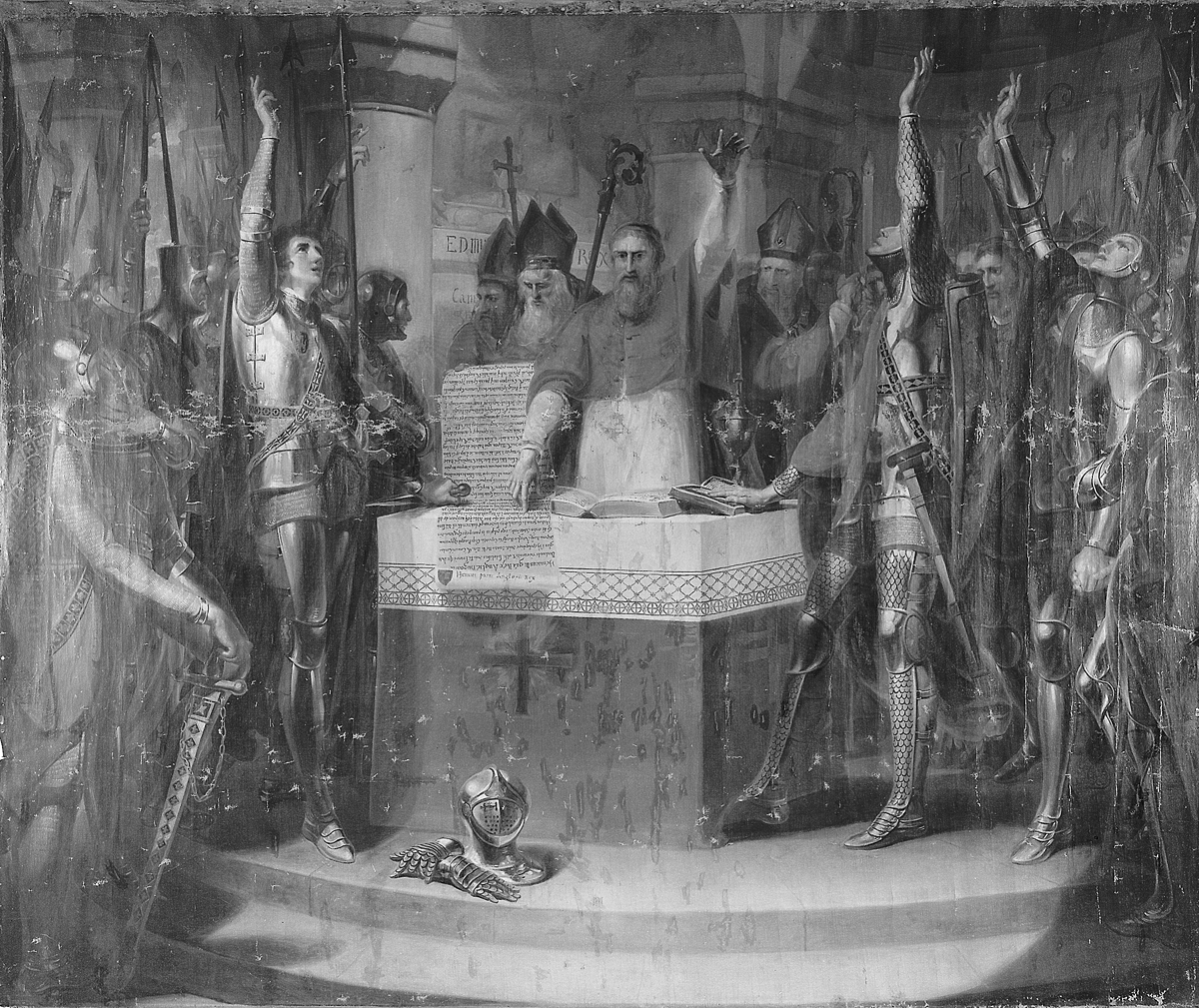
Cardinal Langton and the Barons at St Edmundsbury (1787)

William Martin (1753–c. 1836; fl. 1765–1821) was an English history painter.

== Life ==
William Martin was a pupil and assistant to G. B. Cipriani, RA, and appears to have resided for about twenty years or more in Cipriani's house. In 1766 he was awarded a gold palette for an historical painting by the Society of Arts. In 1775 he exhibited at the Royal Academy a portrait and Antiochus and Stratonice. In the next nine years he contributed portraits, scenes from Shakespeare, or classical subjects. In 1791 he sent Lady Macduff surprised in her Castle of Fife, and in 1797 and 1798 portraits. About 1800 he was engaged on decorative paintings at Windsor Castle, which occupied him some years. He was an exhibitor at the Royal Academy again in 1807, 1810, 1812, and 1816. In 1810 his name appears as 'Historical Painter to His Majesty'. In 1812 he was residing at Cranford in Middlesex, and was still living there in 1821; there is, however, no record of his death at that place.

== Engravings ==
Two of Martin's pictures in St. Andrew's Hall, Norwich, The Death of Lady Jane Grey and The Death of Queen Eleanor, were engraved by F. Bartolozzi, RA, who also engraved his Imogen's Chamber. A picture of The Barons swearing the Charter of Liberties at Bury St. Edmunds, which entered the University of Oxford collection, was engraved in mezzotint by W. Ward. A Cottage Interior was similarly engraved by C. Turner, and The Confidants by J. Watson.
