= Monroe Park =

Park in Richmond, Virginia, United States of America

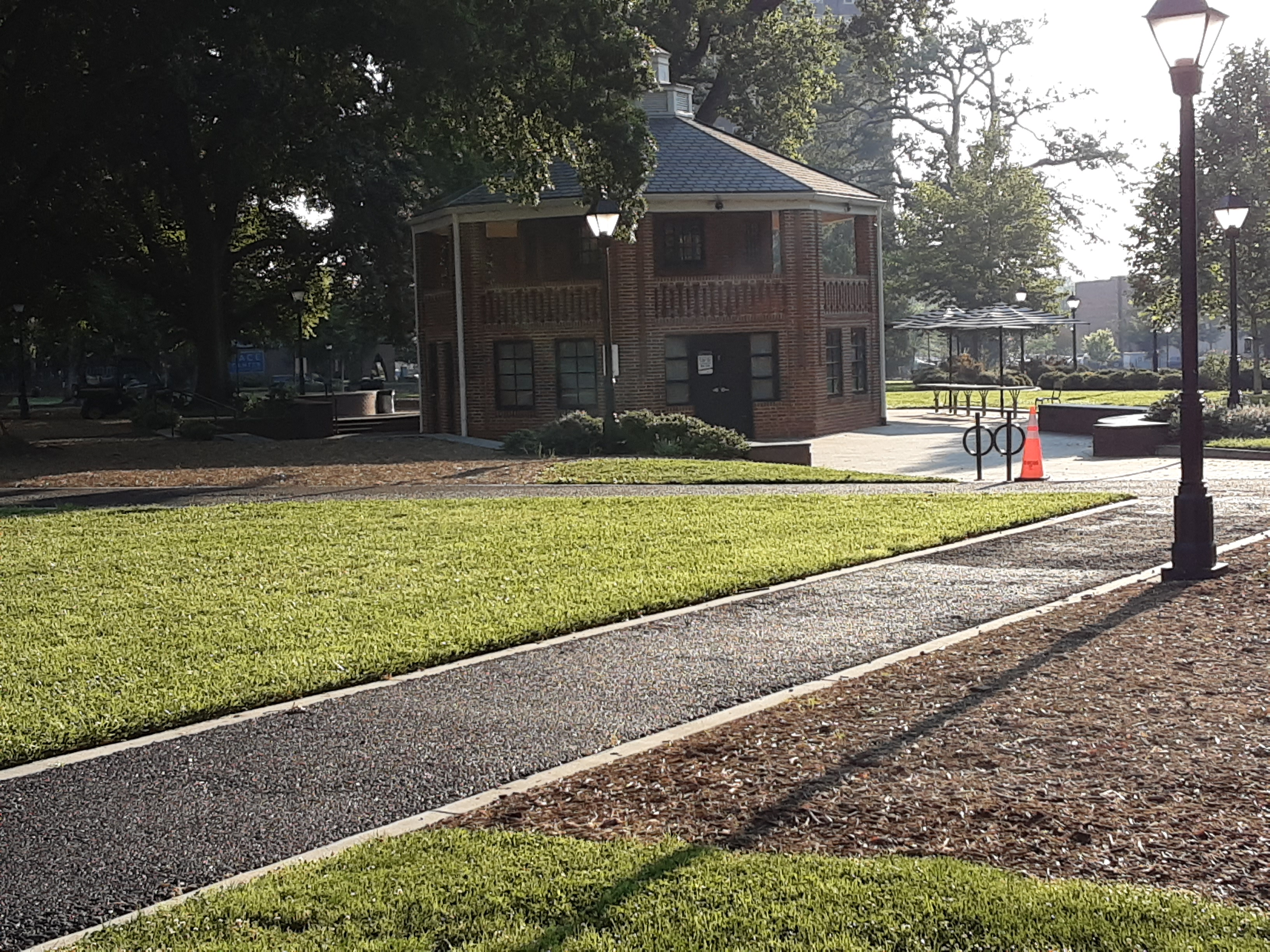
- Monroe Park in June 2023
- Interactive map of Monroe Park
- Type: Public Park
- Location: Richmond, Virginia
- Coordinates: 37°32′48″N 77°27′01″W
- Created: 1851
- Operator: City of Richmond
- Website: monroepark.com
- Monroe Park
- U.S. Historic district – Contributing property
- Built: 1851
- Part of: Monroe Park Historic District (ID84003572)
- Designated CP: July 05, 1984

Monroe Park is a 7.5 acres (3.0 ha) landscaped park 1 mile (1.6 km) northwest of the Virginia State Capitol Building in Richmond, Virginia. It is named after James Monroe, the fifth president of the United States (1817–1825). The park unofficially demarcates the eastern point of the Fan District and is Richmond's oldest park. It occupies the center of the Virginia Commonwealth University Monroe Park Campus.

== Description ==
Monroe Park is pentagonal in shape, with an arrangement of paved paths among lawns and mature deciduous trees, intersecting at a cast iron fountain in the center of the area. This Victorian park is currently in the planning process of a historically sensitive, extensive renovation. The Monroe Park Advisory Council, an organization constituted by Richmond City Councilman William Pantele in 2003, in partnership with the Richmond Department of Parks, Recreation and Community Facilities and Richmond's Department of Community Development are leading the renovation initiative.

=== Features ===
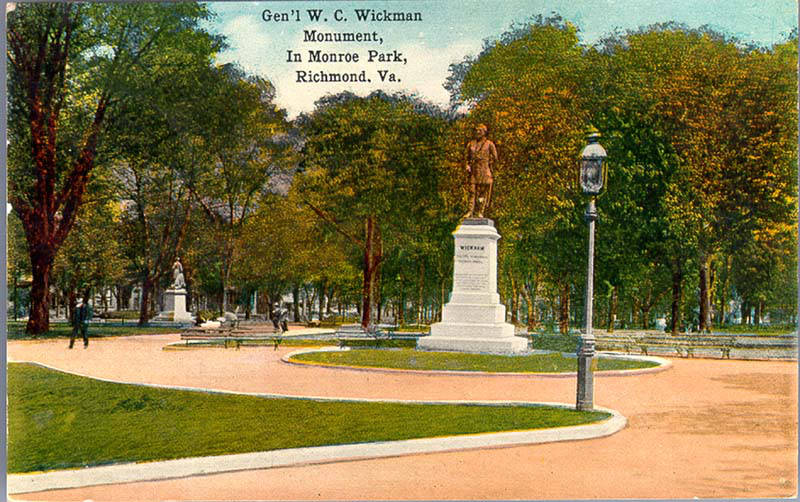
Postcard showing the park and statue

A bronze statue of Williams Carter Wickham designed by Edward Virginius Valentine was erected in the Park in 1891. The work was the gift of Williams' fellow soldiers and the employees of the Chesapeake and Ohio Railway.

In 2017, Clayton and Will Wickham, two of Wickham's descendants, requested that the city of Richmond remove the statue. In their letter to the city council, the brothers wrote that "as a plantation owner, Confederate general and industrialist, General Wickham unapologetically accrued power and wealth through the exploitation of enslaved people".

Public objections to the sculpture's presence in Monroe Park increased during the 2020 George Floyd protests. In June 2020, protesters toppled the sculpture using ropes.

== History ==
The land on which the Park is located was purchased by the City of Richmond in 1851 at the cost of $13,592.56. Originally, the land was used as the State Agricultural Fair Grounds in the mid-19th century. During the American Civil War the area was used as a military camp and military hospital. A central stone fountain was donated by U.S. Army Lieutenant Colonel Albert Ordway in 1872. It was later replaced with the current cast iron fountain in the early twentieth century. Monroe Park was home to the City's first baseball games.
