= William Martin (Australian cricketer) =

Australian cricketer

Personal information
- Born: 21 June 1856; Westbury, Colony of Tasmania
- Died: 10 July 1938 (aged 82); Launceston, Tasmania, Australia

Domestic team information
- Years: Team
- 1877: Tasmania
- Source: Cricinfo, 13 January 2016

William Martin (21 June 1856 – 10 July 1938) was an Australian cricketer. He played one first-class match for Tasmania in 1877.

== See also ==
- List of Tasmanian representative cricketers
