= Billy Martin (shortstop) =

American baseball player (1894-1949)

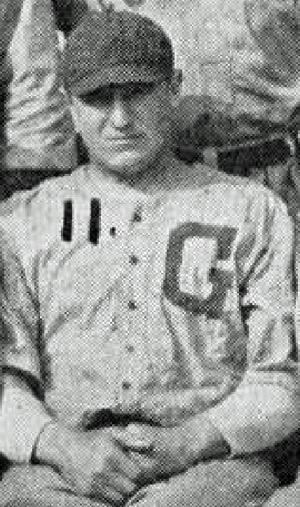
- Shortstop
- Born: February 13, 1894; Washington, D.C., U.S.
- Died: September 14, 1949 (aged 55); Arlington, Virginia, U.S.
- Batted: Right Threw: Right

MLB debut
- October 6, 1914, for the Boston Braves

Last MLB appearance
- October 6, 1914, for the Boston Braves

MLB statistics
- Games: 1
- At bats: 3
- Hits: 0
- Stats at Baseball Reference

Teams
- Boston Braves (1914)

William Gloyd Martin (February 13, 1894 – September 14, 1949) was an American Major League Baseball player. Martin played for the Boston Braves in 1914 as shortstop. After Martin's baseball career ended he founded Martin's Tavern in the Georgetown neighborhood of Washington, D.C.

Martin was born in Washington, D.C., and died in Arlington, Virginia.
