= Athelhampton =

Hamlet in Dorset, England

Coordinates: 50.7476°N 2.3267°W

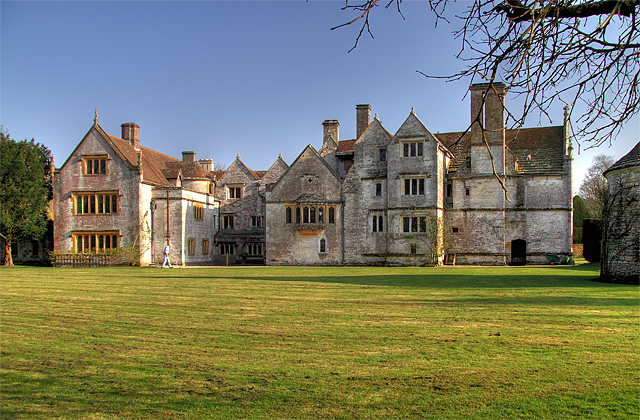
- Athelhampton House

- Location within Dorset
- Population: 30 (2013 estimate)
- Civil parish: Athelhampton and Puddletown
- Unitary authority: Dorset
- Ceremonial county: Dorset
- Region: South West
- Country: England
- Sovereign state: United Kingdom
- Post town: Dorchester
- Postcode district: DT2
- Police: Dorset
- Fire: Dorset and Wiltshire
- Ambulance: South Western
- UK Parliament: North Dorset

Athelhampton (also known as Admiston or Adminston) is a settlement in the civil parish of Athelhampton and Puddletown, in Dorset, England, situated approximately 5 miles (8 km) east of Dorchester. It consists of a manor house and a former Church of England parish church. Dorset County Council's 2013 mid-year estimate of the population of the civil parish is 30. On 1 April 2024 the parish was abolished and merged with Puddletown to form "Athelhampton and Puddletown".

== Manor ==
The Domesday Book records that in 1086 the Bishop of Salisbury, with Odbold as tenant, held the manor, then called Pidele. The name Aethelhelm appears in the 13th century, when Athelhampton belonged to the de Loundres family. In 1350 Richard Martyn married the de Pydele heiress, and their descendant Sir William Martin received licence to enclose 160 acres (65 ha) of land to form a deer park and a licence to fortify the manor.

== Athelhampton Hall ==
The hall is a Grade I listed 15th-century country house retaining much of its original Tudor character including a magnificent Great Hall with fine hammerbeam roof, and a recently restored Elizabethan Kitchen with a magnificent fireplace. It is surrounded by some 20 acres of gardens originally designed by Inigo Thomas in the 1890s, which are Grade I listed on the Register of Historic Parks and Gardens. The house and gardens are privately owned but are open for public visits almost all of the year, and the property is a member of the Historic Houses Association.

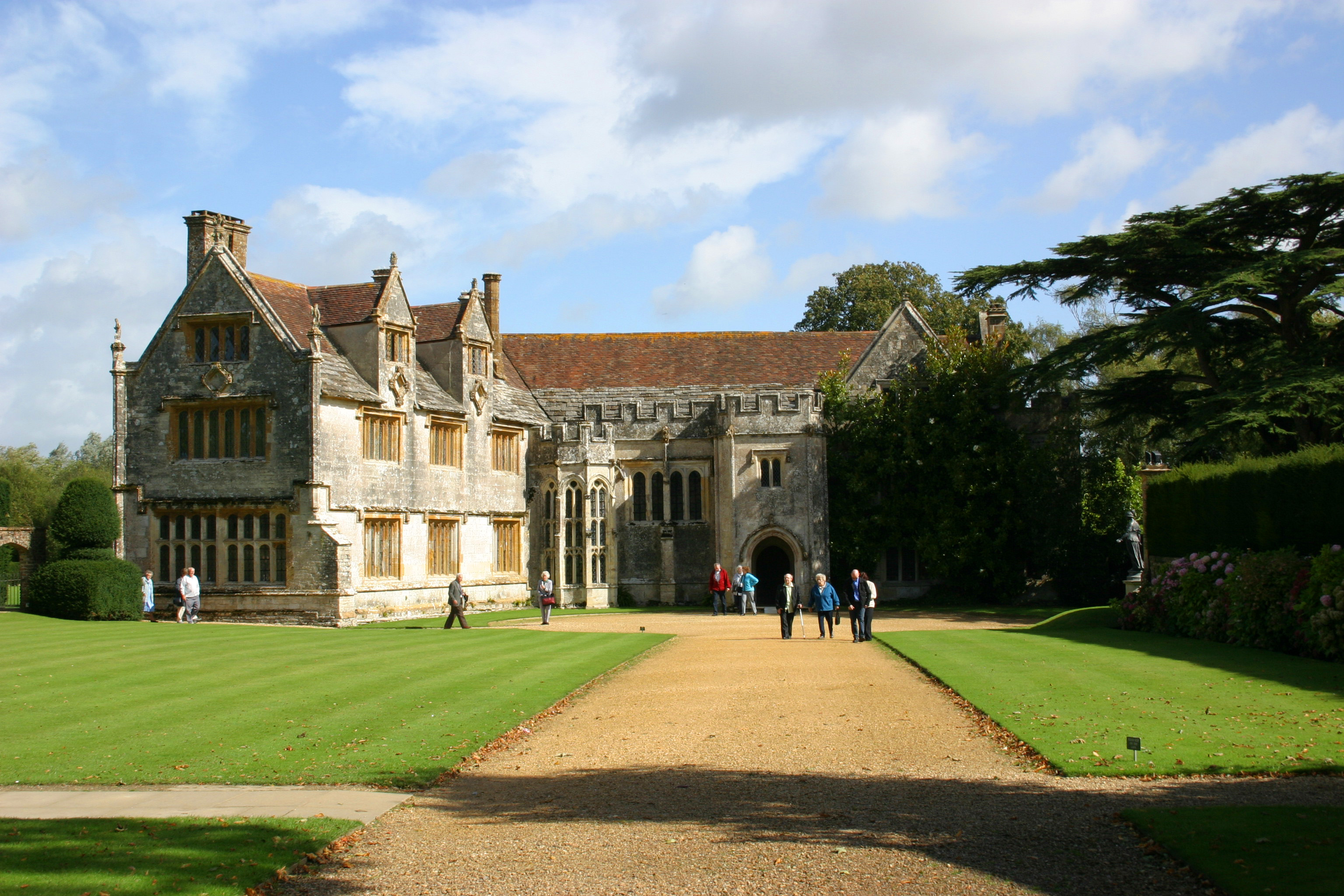
The front façade of Athelhampton Hall with its garden

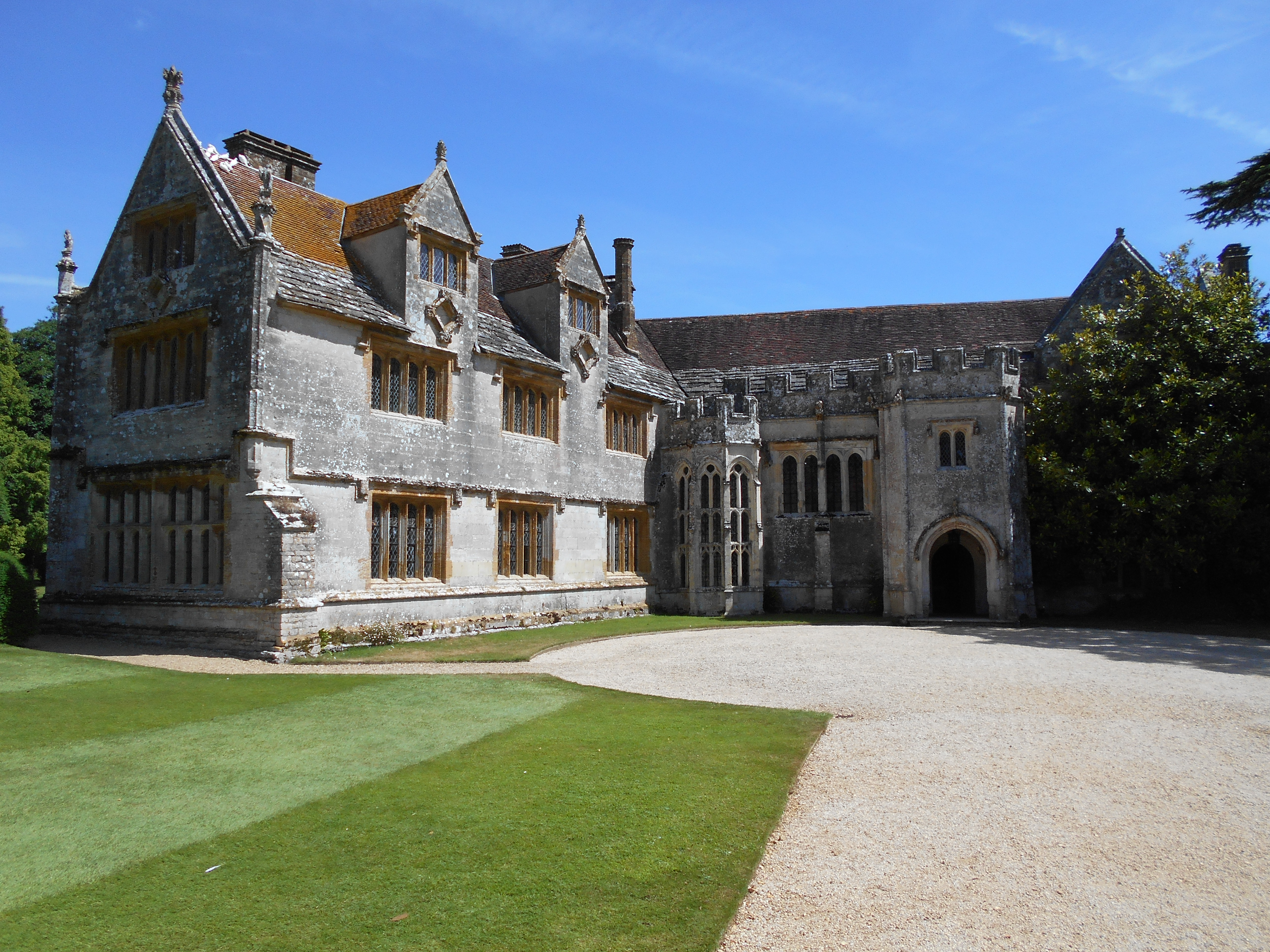
Another perspective of Athelhampton Hall showing the courtyard

Sir William Martyn had the current Great Hall built in about 1485. A West Wing was added in the middle of the next century, forming an attractive oblique angle to the older building that marks it out from other houses of the same era. A gatehouse (demolished in 1862) and a large new kitchen to the rear were added around the same time. Sir William's grandson Robert Martyn married Elizabeth Kelway and when he died, she took as her second husband Sir John Tregonwell, who had acquired significant wealth from the dissolution of the monasteries, which may have helped fund the new works, with his arms appearing in the stained glass of the new wing. The next generation also brought wealth to the family through a marriage alliance, with Sir William Martyn's great-grandson Sir Nicholas Martyn (who was Sheriff of Dorset in 1581) marrying Margaret, sister to and a co-heiress of Nicholas Wadham (co-founder with his wife Dorothy of Wadham College, Oxford, and who being childless had his three sisters as co-heiresses, at least in their issue).

Sir Nicholas Martyn and Lady Margaret's monumental brass, showing them kneeling between an escutcheon with the ancient arms of FitzMartin or Martyn (Argent, two bars gules) impaling Wadham survives in St. Mary's Church, Puddletown. The three sons who predeceased them kneel behind their father. To the right, kneeling behind their mother, are their seven daughters, of whom four survived as co-heiresses. The Great Hall at Athelhampton contains fine stained glass, with the eight panels in the fine Oriel Window each showing the Martyn arms impaled with the various arms of families with whom they formed marriage alliances, including the Kelways and the Wadhams.

Each of the four Martyn daughters married; the eldest, Elizabeth, initially to Henry Brune and subsequently to Thomas Hanham (Hamon); Jane initially to Chidiock Tichborne (executed as one of the Babington plotters in 1586) and then to Tristram Dillington and finally Edward Richards; Frances to Thomas White, and the youngest, Anne, to Anthony Floyer. When Sir Nicholas died in 1596, ownership of the house and park was initially divided among them in four parts, with the shares of the elder three daughters being consolidated in the early seventeenth century into a single unit representing three-quarters, while Anne's quarter-share remained in the ownership of her descendants in the Floyer family until the mid nineteenth century.

Sir Robert Long bought the three-quarters share in 1665 from Sir Ralph Bankes. Ownership passed to James Long Esquire (son of Sir James Long, 2nd Baronet). In 1684 an attempt was made by Mary Keightley in the Court of Chancery to sequester this share of the estate from him to recover a debt, however, after the death of his first wife, he married the plaintiff, and the case seems to have been resolved. Mary Keightley was aunt, by marriage, of Queen Mary II and Queen Anne, and there is a report that a meeting in preparation for the Glorious Revolution, which brought Mary II and her husband William to the throne, took place on the West Wing staircase at Athelhampton.

The three-quarter share of the estate passed down through the Long family to Catherine Tylney-Long, a wealthy early seventeenth-century heiress courted by the Prince of Wales, who later married William Pole-Tylney-Long-Wellesley, 4th Earl of Mornington. After her death, her husband was involved in a court battle for custody of their children which, unusually for the time, he lost. However, he did acquire control of the three-quarter share of Athelhampton, despite provisions in his wife's will to prevent this, and later sold it in 1848 to its tenant farmer George Wood, who also acquired the remaining one-quarter share from the Floyer family, thus bringing the estate back into single ownership for the first time in 250 years.

In 1890, the house and a limited area of land, but not the larger part of the surrounding farmland, was acquired by the antiquarian Alfred de Lafontaine. In the preceding three hundred years, with the split and often absent ownership, the house had been used as a farmhouse and was in partial disrepair, with farm buildings close to it. However, this meant that it had not seen the modernization applied to many other country houses in the eighteenth and nineteenth century, and retained many original Tudor characteristics including an almost unaltered façade (though the gatehouse had been near collapse and was demolished by the Woods). Lafontaine was an early member of the Society for the Protection of Ancient Buildings and an acquaintance of Thomas Hardy, a frequent visitor to the house who following his early career as an architect had become an advocate of sympathetic restoration of older buildings. Lafontaine followed this approach, cleaning and repairing rather than altering, and where he installed modern amenities he did so sensitively, with trench heating under elegant iron grilles in the historic rooms. Hardy's association with the house had begun as a teenager when his father was a stonemason who worked on the house., at which time he painted a watercolour of the south front including the gatehouse. His description of Bathsheba's farmhouse in Far From the Madding Crowd fits Athelhampton closely (though he was also inspired by nearby Waterston house); he set the poem "The Dame of Athelhall" at the house, and his "The Children and Sir Nameless" refers to the Martyn tombs in the Athelhampton Aisle at St Mary's in neighbouring Puddletown.

Lafontaine engaged Inigo Thomas to create a series of "outdoor rooms," inspired by Thomas' extensive researches into gardens from the Elizabethan era onwards and his travels in Europe, and fulfilling his vision that house and garden should reflect one another in a harmonious whole.

Lafontaine put the house up for sale in 1916 and two years later it was purchased by the Cochrane family, who built the current North Wing in 1920–21 on the site of earlier structures. From 1930, it was owned by the Hon Mrs Esmond ("Peggy") Harmsworth, at that time wife of Esmond Harmsworth (later 2nd Viscount Rothermere). During her time at Athelhampton, visitors included Noel Coward and Douglas Fairbanks Jr. In 1949 it was purchased by Rodney Philipps, who lived there with his wife Marika and her mother Marevna, the Russian-French painter who produced a number of paintings of Athelhampton at this time.

In 1957, Athelhampton was acquired by Robert Victor Cooke, and remained in the ownership of the Cooke family for three generations in all, with his son Robert Cooke taking over in 1966 and Patrick Cooke inheriting it in 1995. The Cooke family carried out important restoration work and extension of the gardens, as well as opening the house and gardens to regular public access for the first time.

A serious fire in 1992 destroyed most of the attic and first floor of the east wing. Investigation after the fire indicated that the layout of the rooms on the first floor, built as a service wing, had been altered since the building's inception. A life-size sketch of a classical fireplace was also revealed on the plasterwork behind panelling over an existing fireplace.

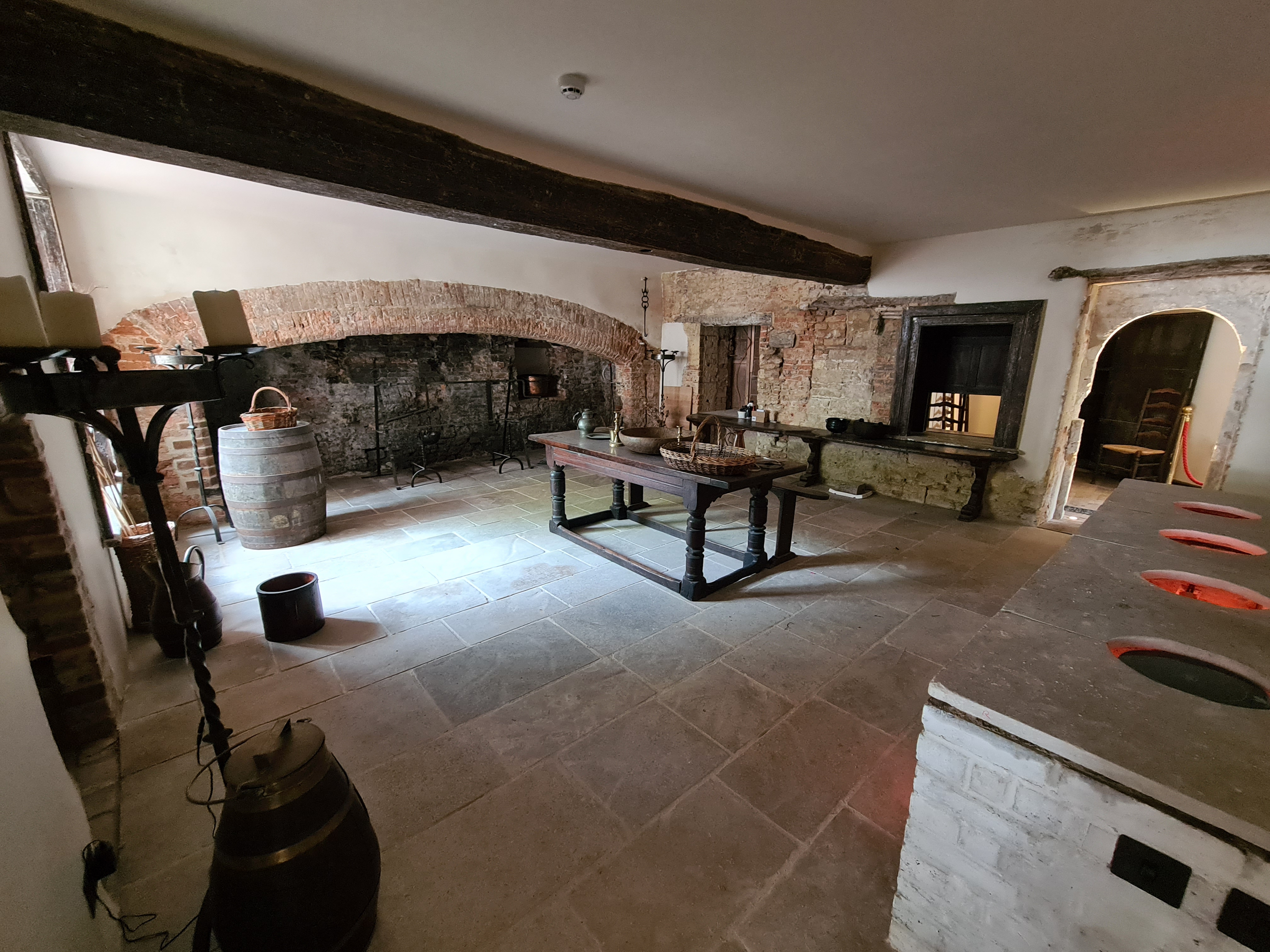
Athelhampton Elizabethan Kitchen, restored 2022, showing the great brick range, serving hatches with dresser, and pot boilers

In 2019, after 62 years of ownership by the family, Patrick Cooke retired and the house was purchased by economist and author Giles Keating, who has undertaken further restoration. The magnificent Elizabethan kitchen, whose range had been bricked in and concealed behind modern units, has been restored and opened to the public for the first time, and many other historic rooms previously closed are now available to visit, with new lighting installed for the hammerbeam roof in the Great Hall. Furniture, lighting, soft furnishings and finishes include work by one of the country's last traditional weavers and by local blacksmiths, stonemasons and joiners, alongside items from the Tudor and later periods. Concealed solar panels and batteries, powering heat pumps, have allowed the removal of gas and oil and the estate now has net zero carbon emissions from current energy usage. The house and gardens are open to the public almost all the year.

=== Gardens at Athelhampton House ===
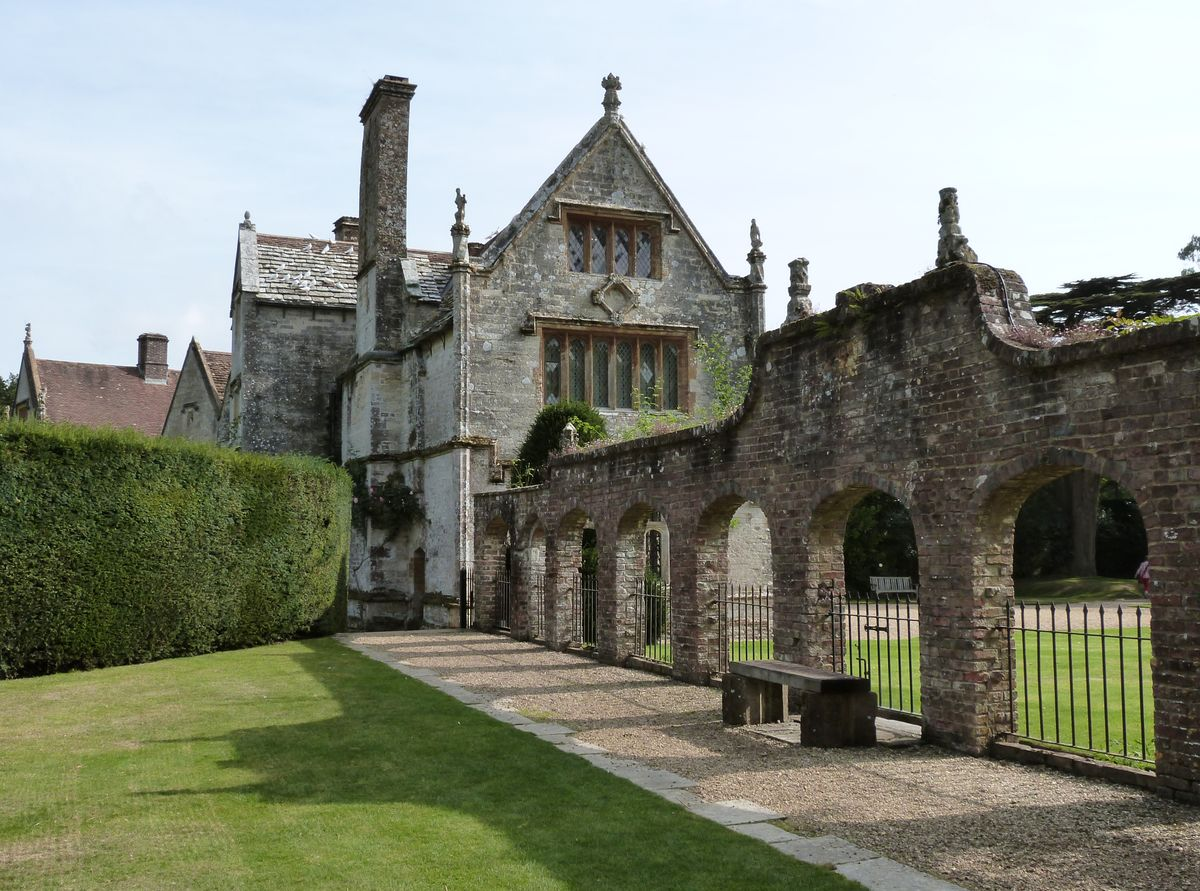
The Gardens at Athelhampton House

The heart of the gardens at Athelhampton was designed and built by Inigo Thomas in 1891–1892, commissioned by Lafontaine. Thomas had studied architecture with Charles Robert Ashbee and had extensively researched English garden design from the Elizabethan era onwards. Around the time he worked on Athelhampton, he undertook a series of study tours across Britain and continental Europe in which he produced illustrations of landscapes, gardens and architecture some of which were used in the 1892 book The Formal Garden in England.

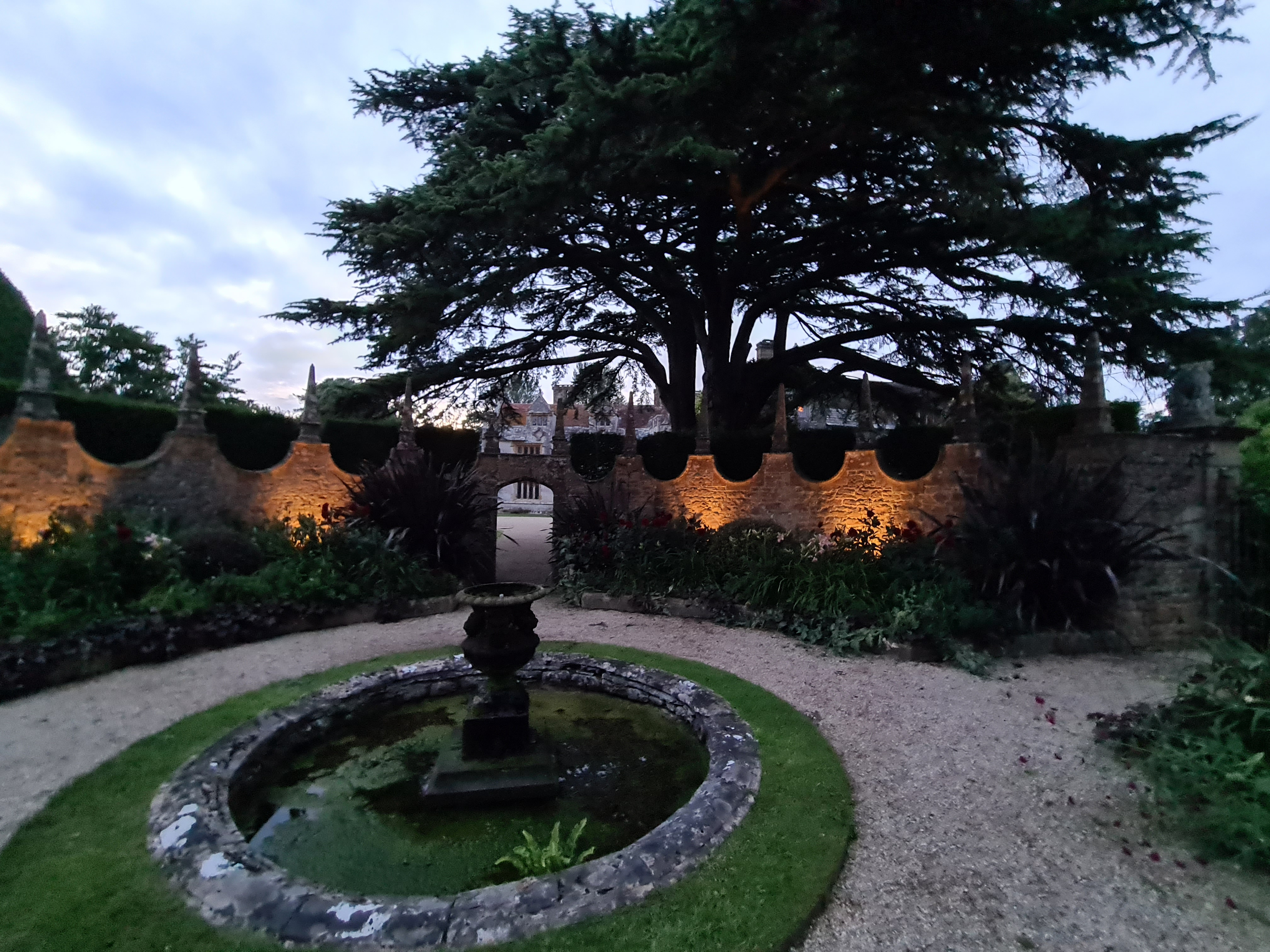
The Coruna is the heart of Inigo Thomas' 1891–1892 garden design

At Athelhampton, he drew these influences together in a way that he later described in a 1900 article, in which he argued that the three chief characteristics of old gardens were enclosure, subdivision, and change of level: "As you have the dining room, library and gallery, so out of doors there was one court for guests to alight in, another for flowers and a third for the lawn game of the period." This vision is apparent to modern visitor walking up the main drive: ahead of them is an area in front of the house with a vast Magnolia grandiflora and a Banksian rose, which is "the court for guests to arrive in;" to their right is the circular Coruna garden which is both a space "for flowers" and an access to further such spaces; while to their left is the West Lawn, perfect for games such as croquet.

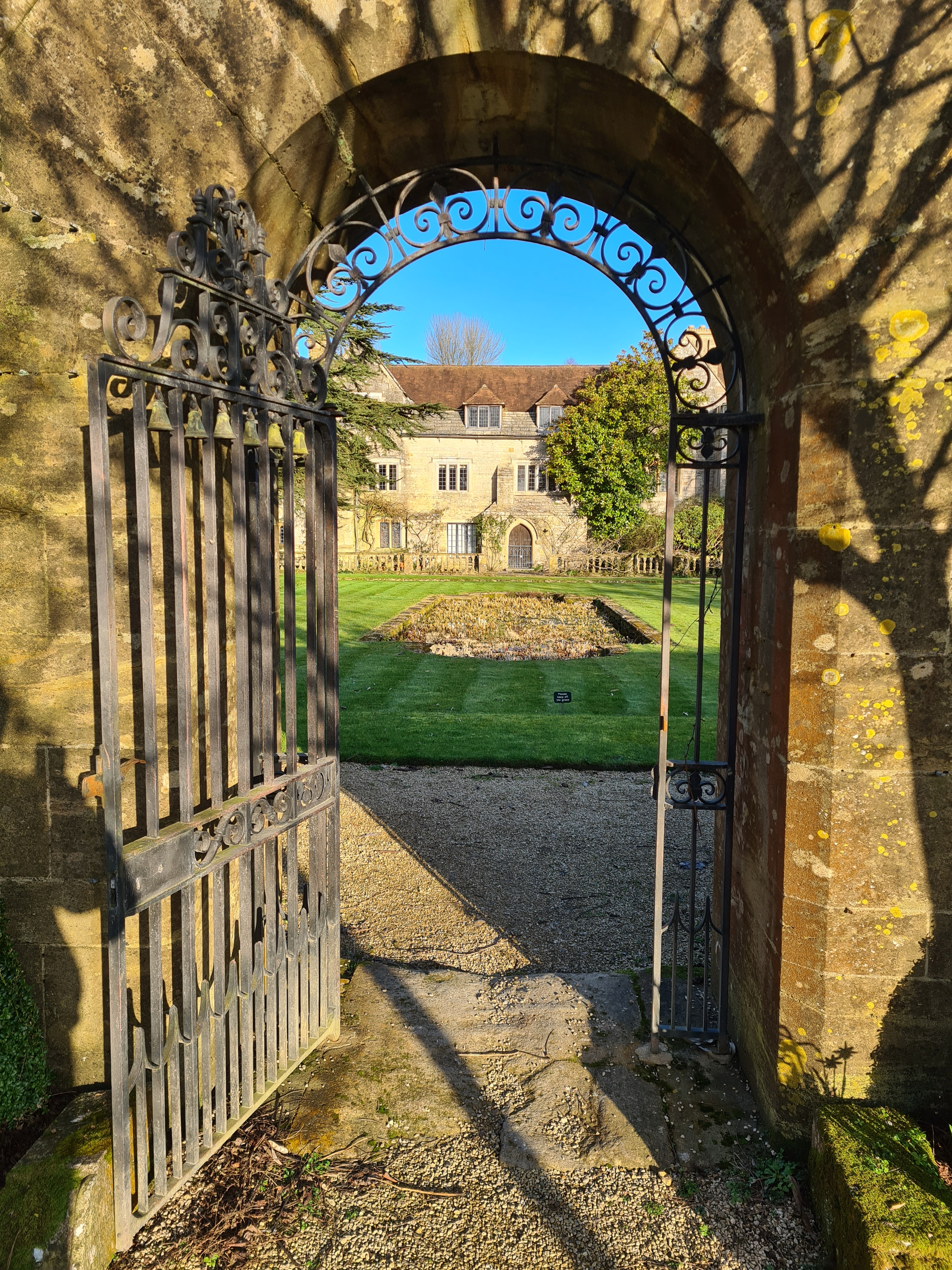
View across the Private Garden Lily Pond to the East Facade -- Inigo Thomas' Third Axis

In a speech to the Art Workers Guild in 1896, published in the Gardener's Magazine and the Journal of the Society of Arts as The Garden in Relation to the House, Thomas explained how the Coruna, an intimate circular space enclosed by a stone wall topped with obelisks and with four gateways to adjacent 'outdoor rooms,' formed the point of intersection of two of the principal axes of his design. A visitor today standing in the Coruna can see the vistas created by these axes: the first running roughly north–south and linking the Great Court with its 12 giant yew pyramids to the Private Garden with its rectangular pond; the second running east–west and linking what is now the Mediterranean Garden with the arrival 'court' in front of the house. Thomas defined a third axis, running parallel to the second along the middle of the rectangular lily pond and meeting the house at the centre of its East facade (which Lafontaine had made symmetric by adding an extra tower). All these axes were parallel to one or other of the main frontages of the house, and this, together with the series of enclosed spaces, served to draw the garden and house together in a harmonic whole, in line with Thomas' vision.

Construction of the gardens was a major undertaking, starting with the demolition of the cowsheds and other dilapidated buildings that remained from the era when Athelhampton had been used as a farmhouse. Lafontaine's 1899 speech to the Dorchester Field Club explains that some 40,000 tons of Ham Hill stone were used in the construction.

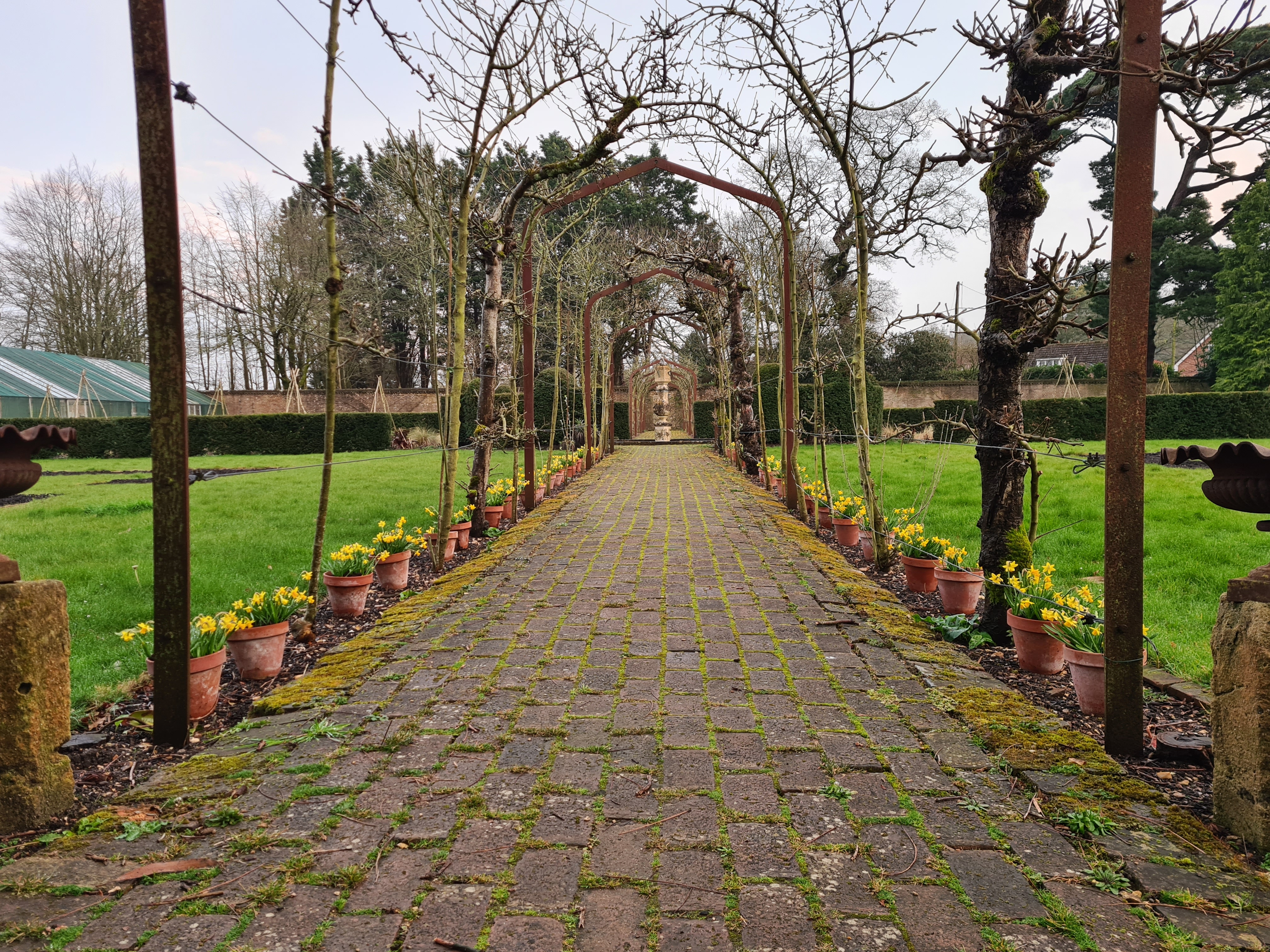
The Kitchen Garden Apple Pergola

The core of Inigo Thomas' design remains today, with a series of extensions that have built on his original concepts. To the east, the Lime Walk runs parallel to the second axis and flowers magnificently in Spring, and beyond that the great Kitchen Garden is also aligned with the axes, and creates a further, large. outdoor room, its outer walls covered in pear trees that support roses and Clematis, while inside are pergolas of living apples trees. To the west, Lafontaine in 1901 asked Thomas Mawson to prepare plans to continue the works, which seem to have still been incomplete; the change of designer may have reflected Thomas being incarcerated in a Boer War prison camp at this time. Parts but not all of Mawson's plans were carried out, notably the long Yew Alley that runs south from the West Lawn, near the ancient dovecote. Along the side of the River Piddle, which forms the northern boundary of the formal gardens, an embankment was built that creates a waterside walkway connecting the core of Thomas' design, on the east of the house, with the Mawson areas to the west.

== Parish church ==
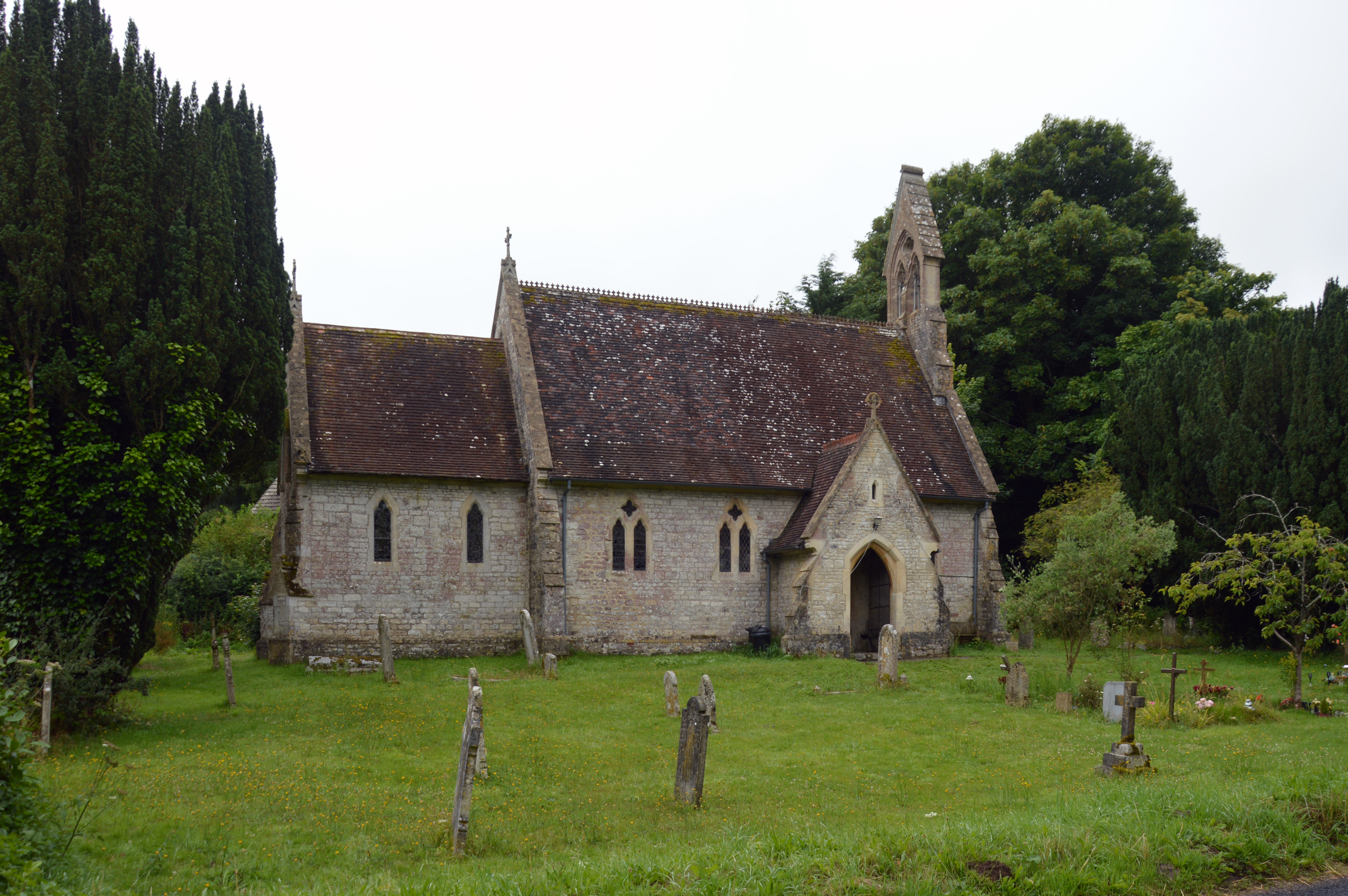
The former parish church of St John, now the Orthodox parish church of St Edward.

Across the former A35 road is the former Church of England parish church of St John, built in 1861–62 to move the old parish church away from the house. St John's was designed by the Dorchester architect John Hicks, who employed Thomas Hardy at the time. The Diocese of Salisbury declared St John's redundant in 1975, after which it fell into disrepair. The church, its pews and most of the graveyard were purchased by Athelhampton Estate in order to protect the building. It is now used by the Antiochian Orthodox parish of St Edward King and Martyr. A congregation worships at services at the church every Sunday.

== Railway locomotive ==
Great Western Railway steam locomotive 6971 Athelhampton Hall was one of the 71 Modified Hall Class locomotives used for passenger and freight in south and southwest England. British Railways withdrew 6971 from service in October 1965 and she was scrapped. The locomotive's nameplates are displayed at Athelhampton.

== Filming location ==
The house has been used as a location for the film Sleuth (1972), the Doctor Who serial The Seeds of Doom (1976) and the episode "The Unicorn and the Wasp" (2008), and Julian Fellowes's film From Time to Time (2009), based on The Chimneys of Green Knowe.

== Sources ==
- Newman, John; Pevsner, Nikolaus (1972). Dorset. The Buildings of England. Harmondsworth: Penguin Books. pp. 80–83. ISBN 0-14-071044-2.
