= Bill Martin (rugby league) =

William Martin
Personal information
- Full name: William Martin
- Born: 1933
- Died: 30 May 2007 (aged 74) Carlisle, Cumbria, England

Playing information
- Position: Prop
Club
Years	Team	Pld	T	G	FG	P
≤1962–≥62	Workington Town
Representative
Years	Team	Pld	T	G	FG	P
1962	Great Britain	1	0	0	0	0

William Martin (1933 – 30 May 2007) was a professional rugby league footballer who played in the 1960s. He played at representative level for Great Britain, and at club level for Workington Town, as a prop.

== International honours ==
Bill Martin won a cap for Great Britain while at Workington in 1962 against France.
