= Give Me Liberty =

Give Me Liberty may refer to:

- "Give me liberty or give me death!", a 1775 quotation attributed to Patrick Henry

== Film ==
- Give Me Liberty (1936 film), an American drama short directed by B. Reeves Eason
- Give Me Liberty (2019 film), an American comedy directed by Kirill Mikhanovsky

== Literature ==
- Give Me Liberty (comics), a comic book mini-series by Frank Miller published 1990
- Give Me Liberty, a 1936 book by Rose Wilder Lane
- Give Me Liberty, a 2006 young adult novel by L. M. Elliott
- Give Me Liberty: A Handbook for American Revolutionaries, a 2008 book by Naomi Wolf
- Give Me Liberty!: An American History, a 2004 book by Eric Foner
- Give Me Liberty, a comic drawn by Ted Richards

== Other uses ==
- "Give Me Liberty… or Give Me Death", a 1983 episode of television series Knight Rider
- "Give Me Liberty", a song by David Haberfeld
- "Give Me Liberty", an episode of the television series Supercarrier
- "Give Me Liberty", the first mission of the video game Grand Theft Auto III
- "Give Me Liberty", the callsign of radio station WGML, licensed to Hinesville, Georgia, US

== See also ==
- Liberty or Death (disambiguation)
