= WGML =

WGML may refer to:

- WGML (FM), a radio station (88.1 FM) licensed to serve Vanceboro, North Carolina, United States
- WGML (AM), a defunct radio station (990 AM) formerly licensed to serve Hinesville, Georgia, United States
