= Church Hill, Richmond, Virginia =

- Church Hill
- U.S. National Register of Historic Places
- U.S. Historic district
- Virginia Landmarks Register
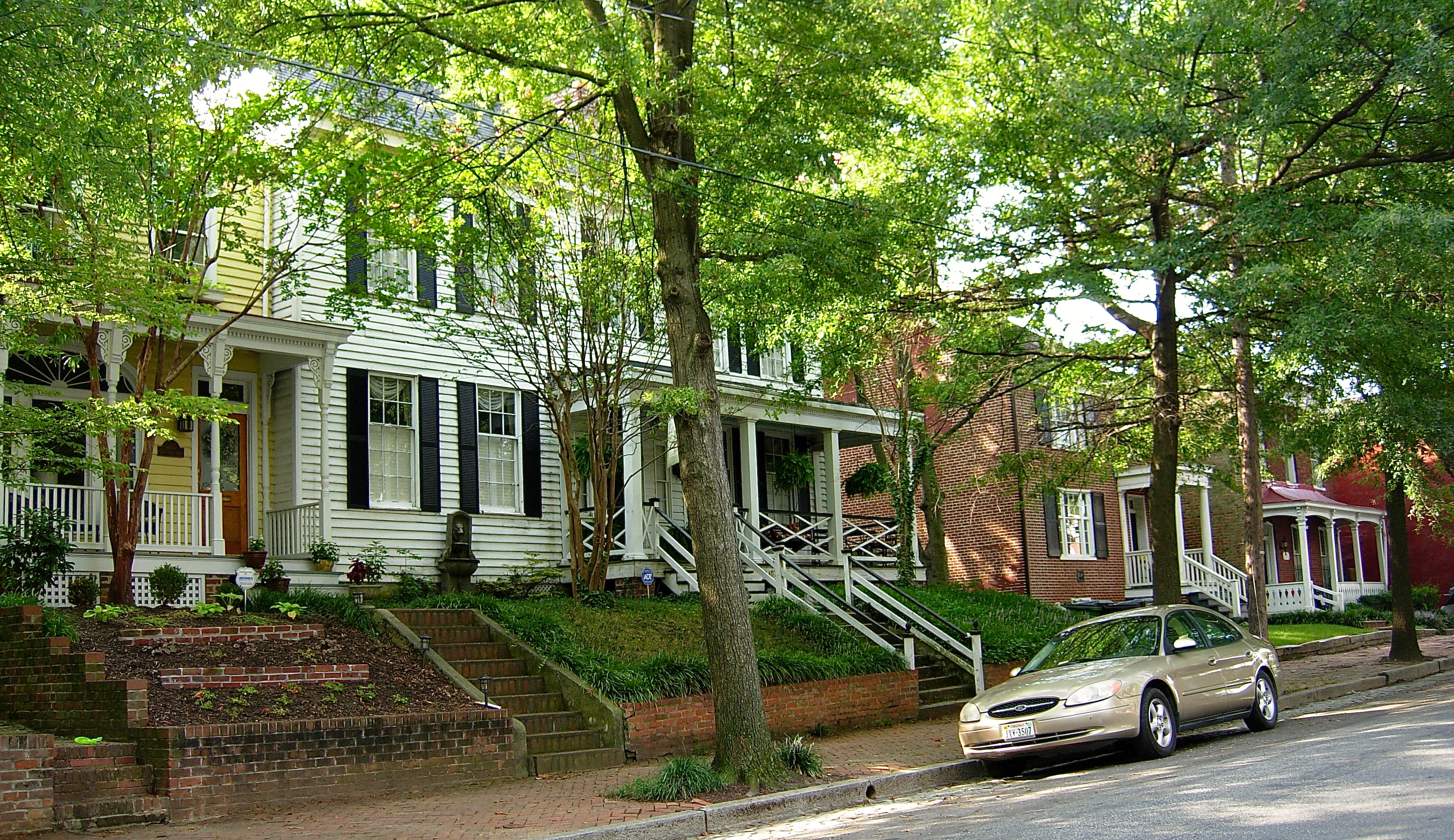
- Street in Church Hill

- Location within Virginia Location within the United States
- Location: Bounded roughly by 22nd, Marshall, 32nd, Main, and Franklin Sts. and Williamsburg Ave., Richmond, Virginia
- Coordinates: 37°31′45″N 77°25′5″W
- Area: 100 acres (40 ha)
- Architect: Byrd, William
- Architectural style: Greek Revival, Federal
- NRHP reference No.: 70000884 (original); 90002097 (increase)
- VLR No.: 127-0192

Significant dates
- Added to NRHP: September 15, 1970
- Boundary increase: January 17, 1991
- Designated VLR: June 2, 1970; April 17, 1990

Church Hill, encompassing the St. John's Church Historic District, is a neighborhood in Richmond, Virginia. This district encompasses the original land plat of the city of Richmond. Church Hill is the eastern terminus of Broad Street, a major east-west thoroughfare in the Richmond metropolitan area. The name Church Hill is often used to describe both the specific historic district and the larger general area in the East End encompassing other neighborhoods such as Union Hill, Chimborazo, Fairmount, Peter Paul, Woodville, etc.

== History ==
=== Early United States, Civil War, and Revolution ===
Church Hill is known for Chimborazo Park, where the largest American Civil War Hospital was located. It is also known as the site of Virginia's second revolutionary convention, where Patrick Henry gave his "Give me liberty or give me death!" speech in St. John's Episcopal Church, Richmond, Virginia in 1775.

=== 20th Century ===
On Friday, October 2, 1925, a 4,000-foot Chesapeake and Ohio railroad single track tunnel built during Reconstruction collapsed under Church Hill. The Church Hill Tunnel collapse occurred during refurbishment works, killing 3 or 4 and engulfing a work train complete with a 4-4-0 engine #231 and 10 flat cars. The tunnel was closed and filled-in after the collapse. In the July 2006, a coalition of officials and historical groups made plans to remove the buried engine. If recovered, it would be displayed at the Virginia Historical Society in Richmond. Some borings were made into the tunnel from above for examination by camera. Only murky water was found, whereupon further work was delayed by city permitting issues. The bricked-in entrance of the collapsed tunnel can still be seen at the south-east end of the alley just north of Marshall Street, on 18th Street.

Douglas Wilder, the first African American to have been elected governor of a U.S. state^{1}, was born and raised in Church Hill.

In the 1970s, murder rates decreased overall in Richmond, Virginia, but instances of murder in Church Hill doubled.

=== 21st Century ===
In recent years, Church Hill has undergone gentrification and now experiences much lower rates of crime than it did in the late 20th century.

Church Hill is home to many small businesses, including restaurants, bars, hair salons, and boutiques. In 2014, Church Hill was named one of the "10 Hot Food Neighborhoods Around the U.S" by Zagat. In 2015, Redfin included Church Hill in a roundup of most walkable neighborhoods in the city—while Richmond was named #9 in their list of Top 10 Most Walkable Mid-Sized Cities.

== Preservation efforts ==
The Church Hill neighborhood experienced serious physical decline during the 1950s, owing mostly to absentee landlords. The Historic Richmond Foundation was established in 1956 by Elisabeth Scott Bocock out of concern for "saving and enhancing the setting for St. John's Church." In 1957, encouraged in large part by Historic Richmond, City Council created a historic district ordinance while simultaneously adopting the St. John's Church Old and Historic District. The preservation of Church Hill marked the formal beginning of the preservation movement in Richmond.

== Notable Structures, Monuments and Parks ==
- St. John's Episcopal Church (Richmond, Virginia)
- Adams Double House
- Chimborazo Park
- Elmira Shelton House
- Jefferson Park
- Libby Hill Park
- Pohlig Brothers Building
- Richmond Hill (a/k/a the Adams-Taylor House or Monte Maria)
- St. John's Mews
- Superior Warehouse
- Woodward House
- WRVA Building

== Maps ==
- Wikimapia.org
