= Elisabeth Scott Bocock =

American philanthropist

- Born: February 3, 1901; Richmond, Virginia
- Died: December 9, 1985 (aged 84); Richmond, Virginia
- Known for: Philanthropy and Historic Preservation

Elisabeth Scott Bocock (February 3, 1901 - December 9, 1985) was an American patron of the arts. Known for her philanthropy and historic preservation, she was active in founding a number of organizations in Richmond, Virginia.

== Personal life ==
She was born in Richmond, Virginia. She was one of five children. When Elisabeth was six years old, her parents, Elisabeth ("Elise") Strother Scott and Frederic Scott, built a home at 909 West Franklin Street in Richmond, VA. The family purchased the plot of land from the Lewis Ginter estate in 1907 and moved into the new construction in 1911. Today, The Scott House is owned by Virginia Commonwealth University and referred to as the VCU Scott House.

The young Elisabeth Scott attended Miss Jennie Ellett's School (now St. Catherine's School, Richmond, Virginia) and graduated from St. Timothy's School in Stevenson, Maryland. In 1928, Elisabeth married John Holmes Bocock who was an attorney in Richmond. Mr. Bocock died in 1958.

After her husband died, Bocock enrolled in classes at the Pennsylvania School of Horticulture for Women (Temple University). During the next decade, Mrs. Bocock attended classes at Mary Baldwin College, College of William and Mary, and the University of Virginia. She finished her schooling by receiving a liberal arts degree from Virginia Commonwealth University. In 1969, VCU’s first degree-granting year, Elisabeth Scott Bocock received the first diploma handed out at the commencement ceremony, a Bachelor of Arts in English.

== Patron of the arts ==
Later in life, Bocock was recognized by multiple organizations for her contributions to the city of Richmond, its cultural life, and its people. Recognition came from VCU, the Junior League, and the Federated Arts Council, among others.

Bocock, a lover of arts and historic preservation, applied her money and talents to a variety of related causes. She was a founder of the Richmond Symphony (1957), the William Byrd Branch of the Association for the Preservation of Virginia Antiquities (Preservation Virginia), the Historic Richmond Foundation (1956), the Early Virginia Vehicular Museum (Carriage Collection, 1975), the Hand Workshop (Visual Arts Center of Richmond, 1963), and Richmond-on-the-James.

Bocock is credited with setting in motion Richmond's agenda for historic preservation. During her life, she collected at least 60 horse-drawn carriages and donated them to Maymont Foundation (Maymont Park) in 1975.

== Death and legacy ==
Bocock's obituary ran in the Richmond Times Dispatch on December 10, 1985. She was 84 years old at the time of her death on December 9, 1985:

She was a member of the Historic Richmond Foundation's executive committee...and many of her projects were completed through the foundation. "She was sort of the preservation conscience of Richmond for so many years. She really started to turn the tide in Richmond as far as preservation was concerned," said Pam White, assistant director of the foundation.

The following is an excerpt from an article about Bocock's contributions to the city of Richmond, published on December 12, 1985, in the Richmond Times Dispatch:

Evidences of her astonishing energy and civic mindedness are all around town. Along with the late Dr. Wyndham B. Blanton and others, she was a founder, in 1956, of the Historic Richmond Foundation, which was instrumental in revitalizing the Church Hill neighborhood around historic St. John's Church. Later, Mrs. Bocock would establish the Hand Workshop, a craftsmen's outlet, in that area. She also was a founder of the Maggie L. Walker Foundation, which has had a hand in preserving some of the distinctive structures in Jackson Ward.

A more lengthy article was published in the Richmond Times Dispatch on December 16, 1985, and included the following excerpts, providing a sense of Bocock's personality and philanthropy and including quotes from her two daughters, Mary Buford Hitz and Bessie Carter:

While Mrs. Bocock was studying in Pennsylvania, she never missed one of her daughter's basketball games at St. Timothy's in Baltimore. "She had a little Japanese folding bicycle on which she would ride to the train station, fold it up, get on the train, catch a taxi in Baltimore, and then, after the game, reverse the process," Mrs. Hitz said.

Her zeal for conservation prompted her to get a degree. Her desire, she once said, was "to teach, to write, or just to exude to my companions something knowledgeable about conservation that would persuade them to put out a few trees and have less poison gas. But I was standing on a twig. I needed the firm basis of an education."

"Her passion," Mrs. Carter said, "was to be useful. She was nearly always late. She thought she could do five things for five people, when most people could only do for two -- and she usually got four of them done."
