= Libby Hill, Richmond =

Libby Hill
- Neighborhood of Richmond
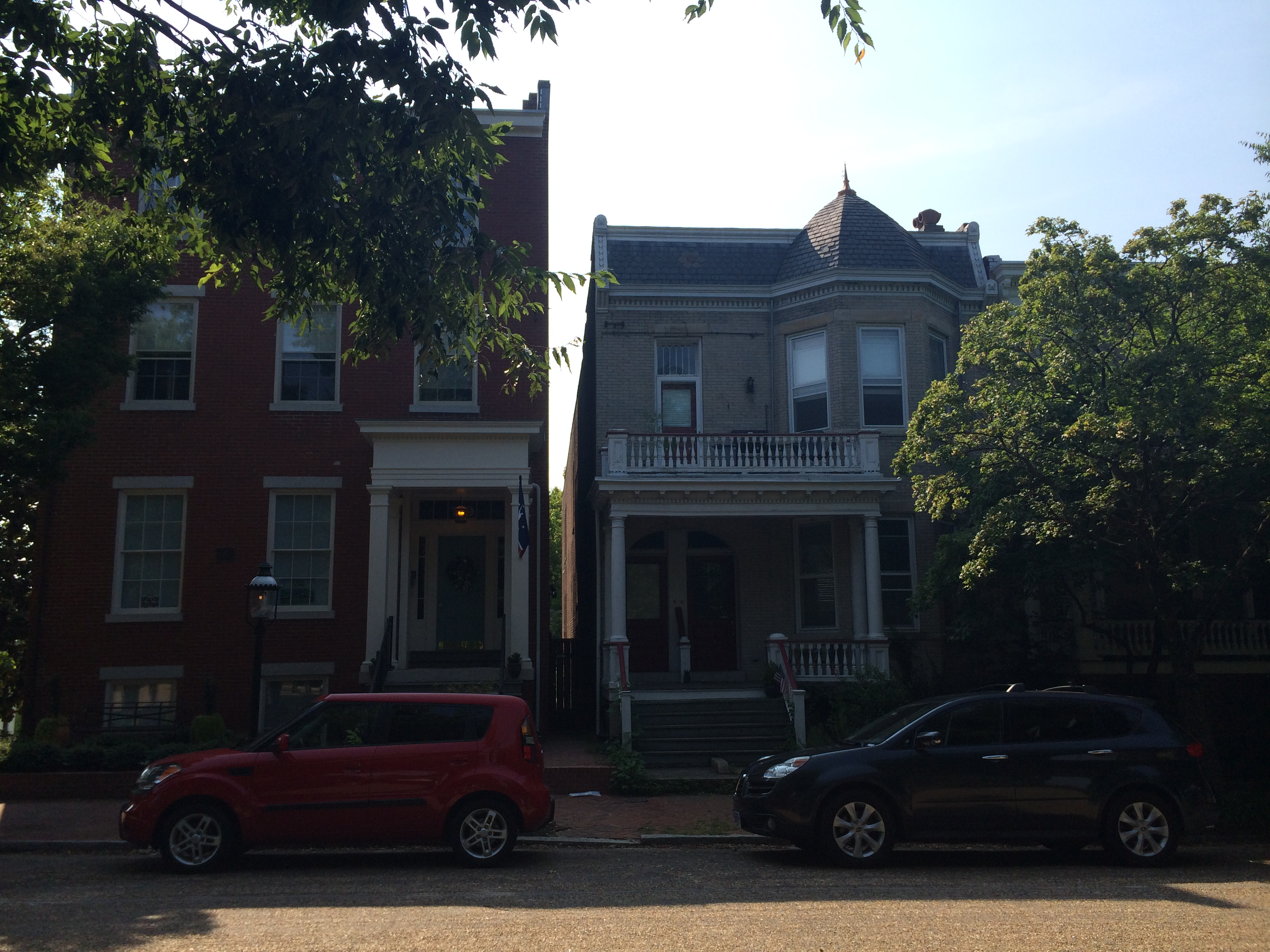
- Houses on Libby Hill
- Interactive map of Libby Hill
- Coordinates: 37°31′39″N 77°25′1″W
- Country: U.S.
- State: Virginia
- City: Richmond
- District: St. John's Church Historic District (Church Hill)
- First settled: Pre-1796
- Oldest building: 1839
- Named for: Luther Libby
- Location: Roughly bounded by 27th St., E. Grace St., 31st St., and Main St.
- School Zone(s): Richmond Public Schools; Chimbarazo Elementary School; Martin Luther King Jr. Middle School; Armstrong High School

Libby Hill is a small neighborhood in Richmond, Virginia. Libby Hill is located on the southeastern spur of Church Hill, overlooking the James River and the Lucky Strike building. It is known for Libby Hill Park and "The View that Named Richmond". The Libby Hill neighborhood is entirely within the St. John's Church Historic District.

== History ==
Homes have existed on Libby Hill since mid 1800s. Prominent early residents include Governor George W. Smith and Colonel George Mayo Carrington. Both the Smith and Carrington houses are no longer standing. The oldest building in Church Hill is the Gentry-Strokes-Crew house at 2718 North 27th St. Built in 1839 by John Gentry, this house has undergone many changes since its construction.

The neighborhood is named for Luther Libby, who built his home on the corner of Main St. and 29th St. in 1851. Luther Libby is also the namesake of the notorious Libby Prison, even though he had no influence in the operations of the prison.

Another older house in Libby Hill is the Saunders House, built the same year as the Libby House on the corner of Main St. and 29th St. The house at 11 1/2 North 29th St. is remarkable in that Mary Wingfield Scott, renowned Richmond historian, wrote that it is "adorned with one of the most beautiful iron verandahs in Richmond".

== The View That Named Richmond ==
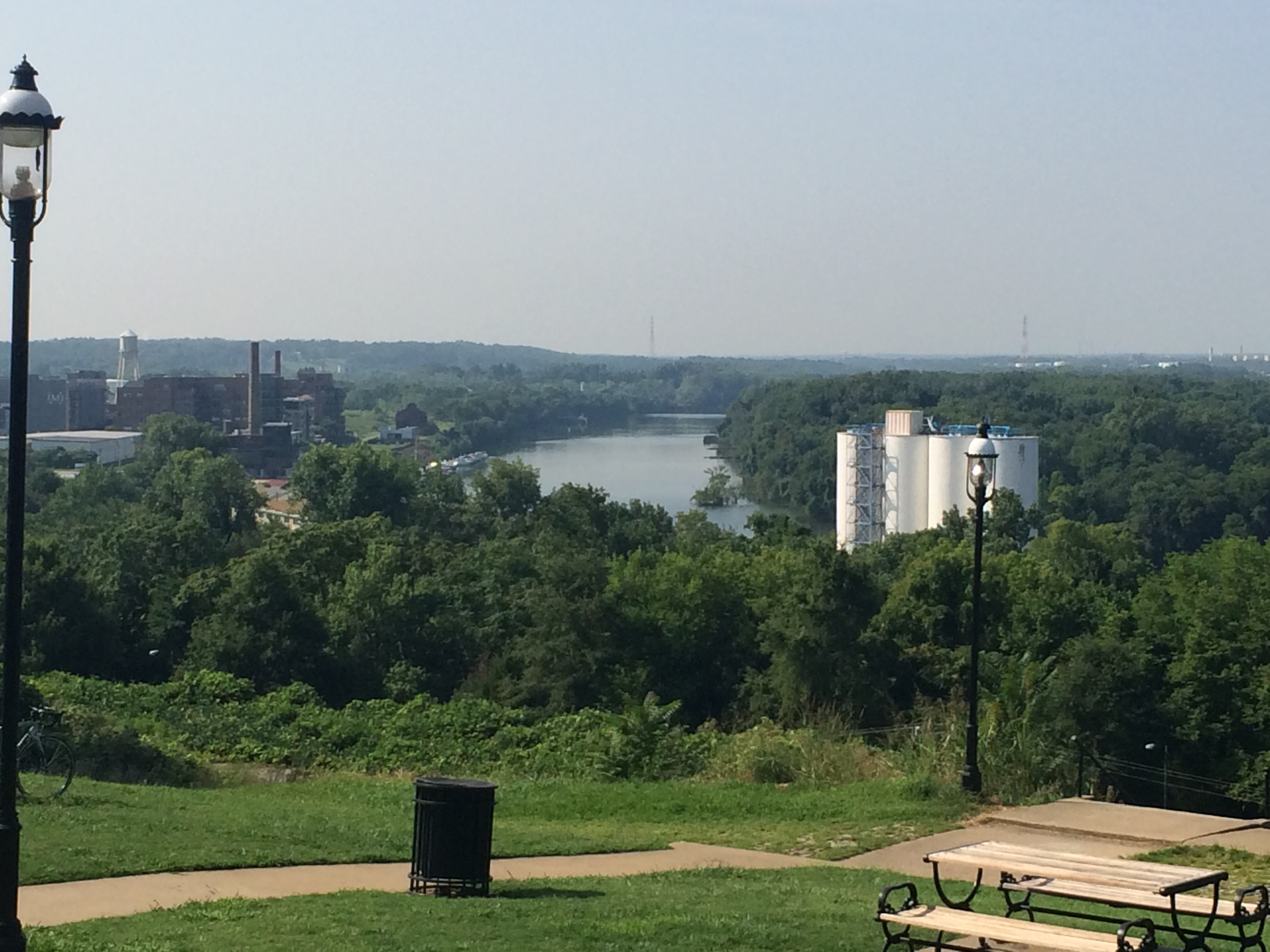
The view that is said to mirror a view in Richmond, London.

Looking from site of Monte Maria Convenl down towards the James River is said to be "The View That Named Richmond". William Byrd II is said to have thought that this view resembled the view of Richmond upon Thames in England.

There is a plaque on Libby Hill that states the following:

The curve of the James River and steep slope on this side are very much like the features of the River Thames in England, a royal village west of London called Richmond upon Thames. Libby Hill was undeveloped at time so it was not highest point on church hill but 22nd and Franklin.
William Byrd II, an important planter, merchant, politician and writer, was asked by the House of Burgesses to plan a town at the Falls of the James in the early 1730s.

As he had traveled several times to Richmond upon Thames, it is believed that the view led him to name this new town 'Richmond.'

As of 2014, there is a proposed condominium project that could threaten this view.

Other landmarks visible from the hill include the Lucky Strike building, the Armitage Manufacturing Company building, Rockett's Landing, and Manchester, Virginia.

== Confederate Soldiers and Sailors Monument ==
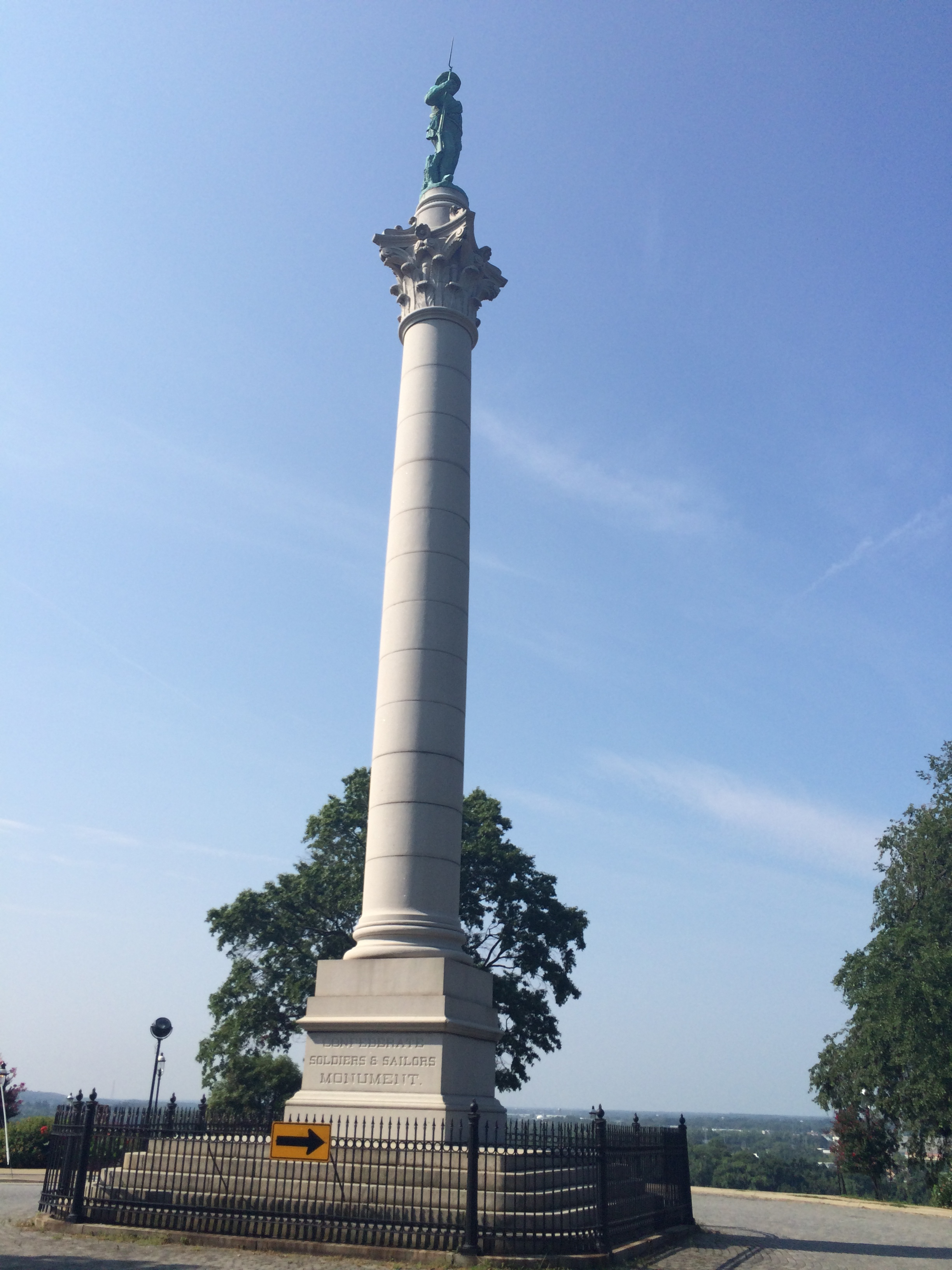
Confederate Soldiers And Sailors Monument, 2014

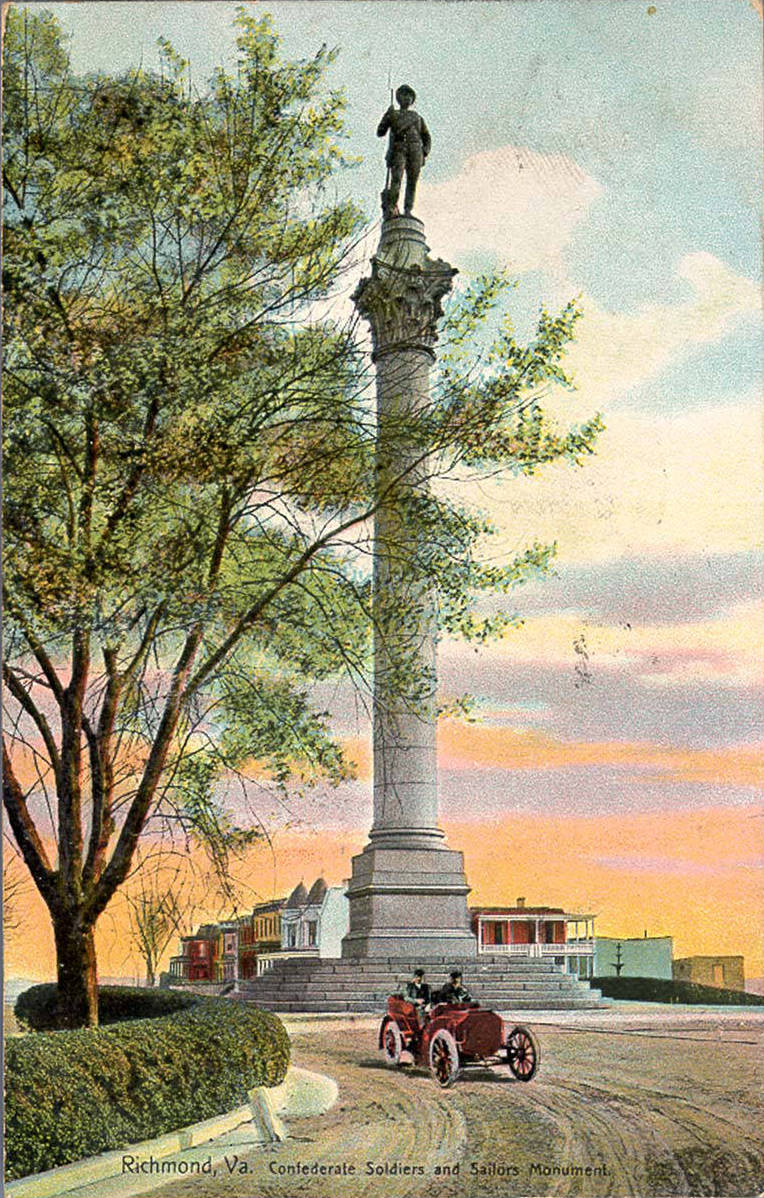
Confederate Soldiers and Sailors Monument postcard, c.1900

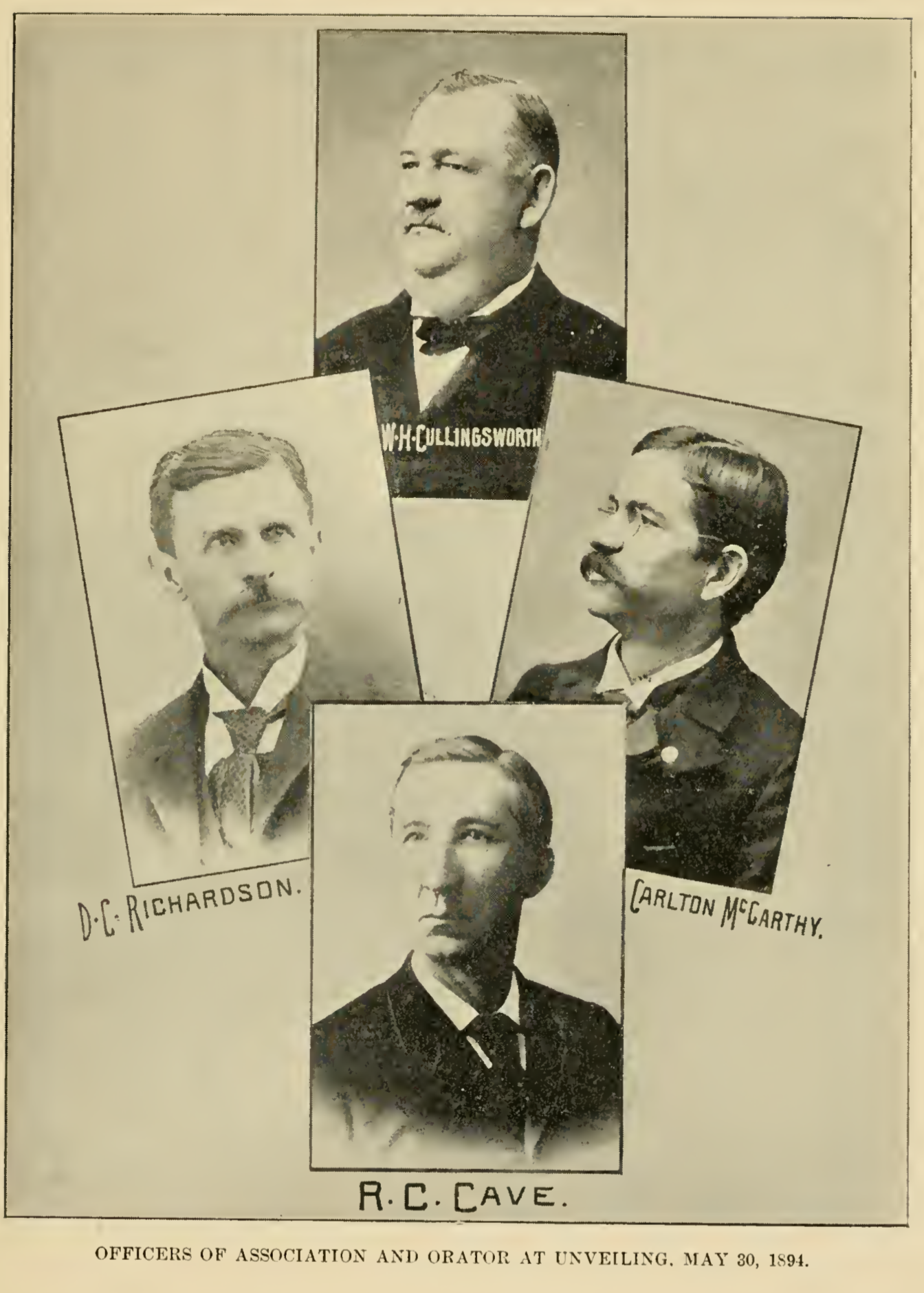
Officers of Association and orator at unveiling of Richmond Confederate Soldiers and Sailors Monument, 1894

Given the expansive view and the fact that the hill overlooked the site where the Confederate Navy Yard had operated, it was once planned to erect a memorial to Robert E. Lee on Libby Hill. When it was decided that the Lee Memorial would be built on the other side of Richmond, on Monument Avenue, plans for a monument to all Confederate Soldiers and Sailors on Libby Hill were formed.

The Confederate Soldiers' & Sailors' Monument Association was formed in 1889, with future Richmond mayor David C. Richardson as its chair. They decided that the monument was should be modeled after "Pompey's Pillar" in Alexandria, Egypt. It depicts a bronze Confederate private standing on top of the pillar, which is composed of 13 granite blocks to symbolize each of the Confederate states. The monument was completed at the south end of 29th St. on May 30, 1894, at a total cost of over $30,000. Future Richmond mayor Carlton McCarthy was the orator at its unveiling.

The monument was finally removed by the city on July 8, 2020 after public demand.

An inscription on the statue read the following:

Erected by the Confederate Soldiers & Sailors Monument Association
Anno Domini 1887-1894

== Libby Hill Park ==
Libby Hill Park was created in 1851 and is at the heart of Libby Hill neighborhood. It has been known by a variety of names in the past, including "the Eastern Square", Jefferson Park, Marshall Park, and Marshall Square.

It covers the slopes of the hill between E. Franklin St and Main St. and includes fountains, paths, a small park house, the plaque describing the view that named Richmond, and the Confederate Soldiers and Sailors Monument.

It also includes monuments to Sergeant John Henry Taylor and Officer Thomas "Mongo" McMahon. Sergeant Taylor served in the Richmond City Police Department for over 25 years, before retiring in 2009. "Sergeant John Henry Taylor's Bench" was erected by the Church Hill Crime Watch in honor of his "above and beyond care and concern for the safety of every person living on Church Hill and the surrounding areas". Officer McMahon served in the Richmond City Police Department for over 20 years and was killed in the line of duty when, following a car chase, a suspect shot McMahon multiple times.

The steep, winding cobblestone path through the park served as one of the signature sections of the road race course used during the 2015 UCI Road World Championships.

== Gallery ==
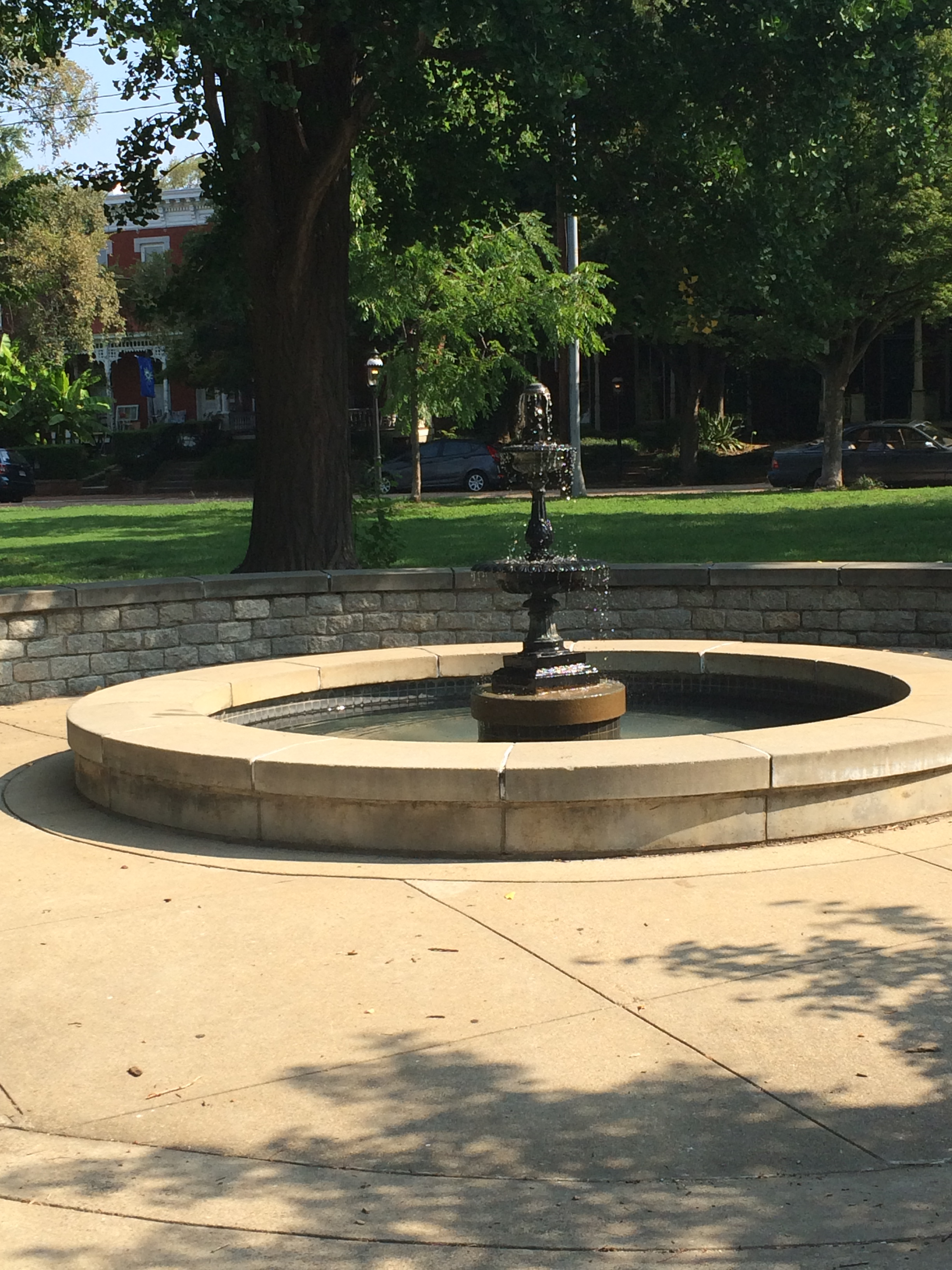
A fountain in Libby Hill Park

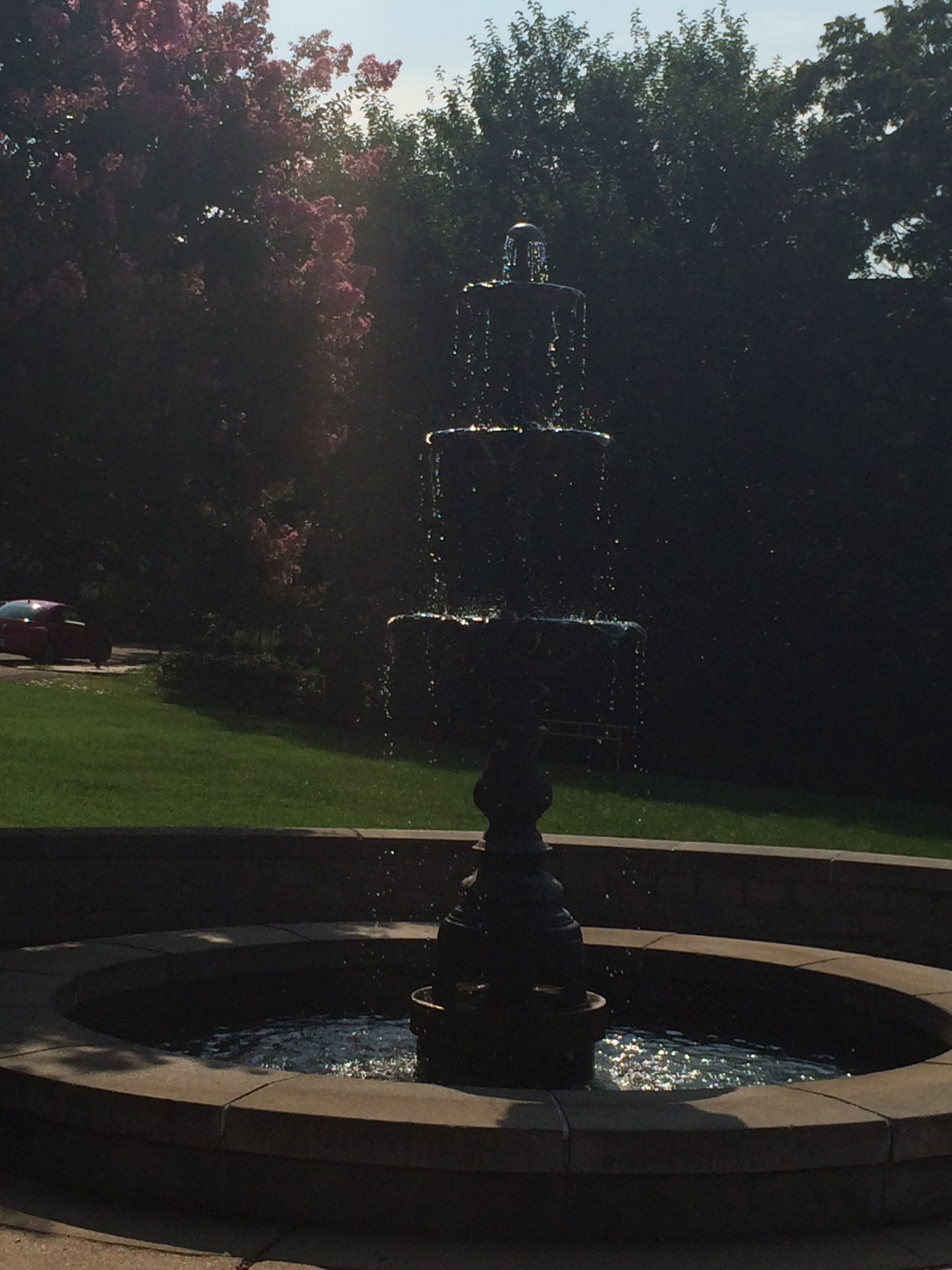
Another fountain in Libby Hill Park

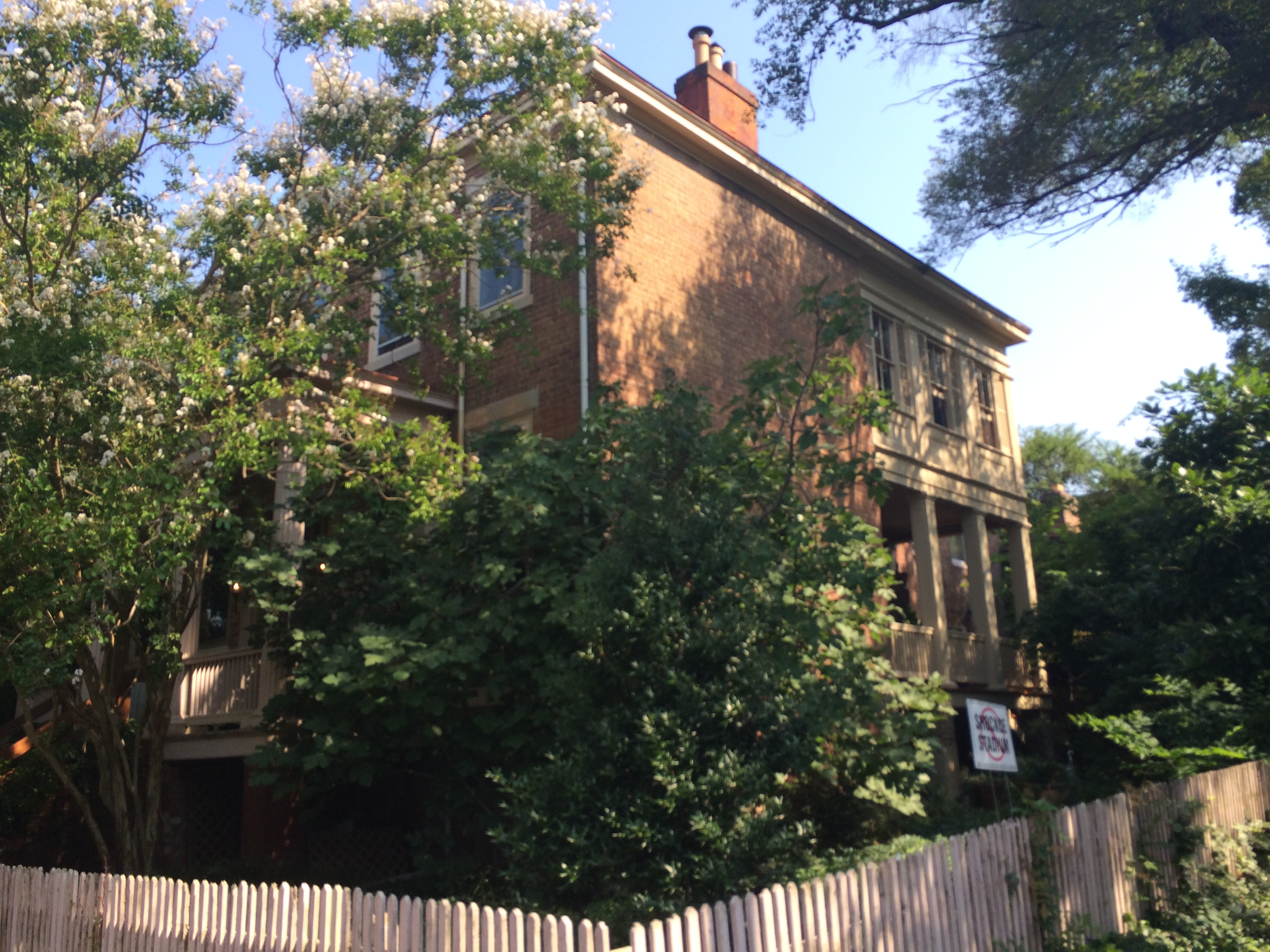
House at 2718 N. 27th St

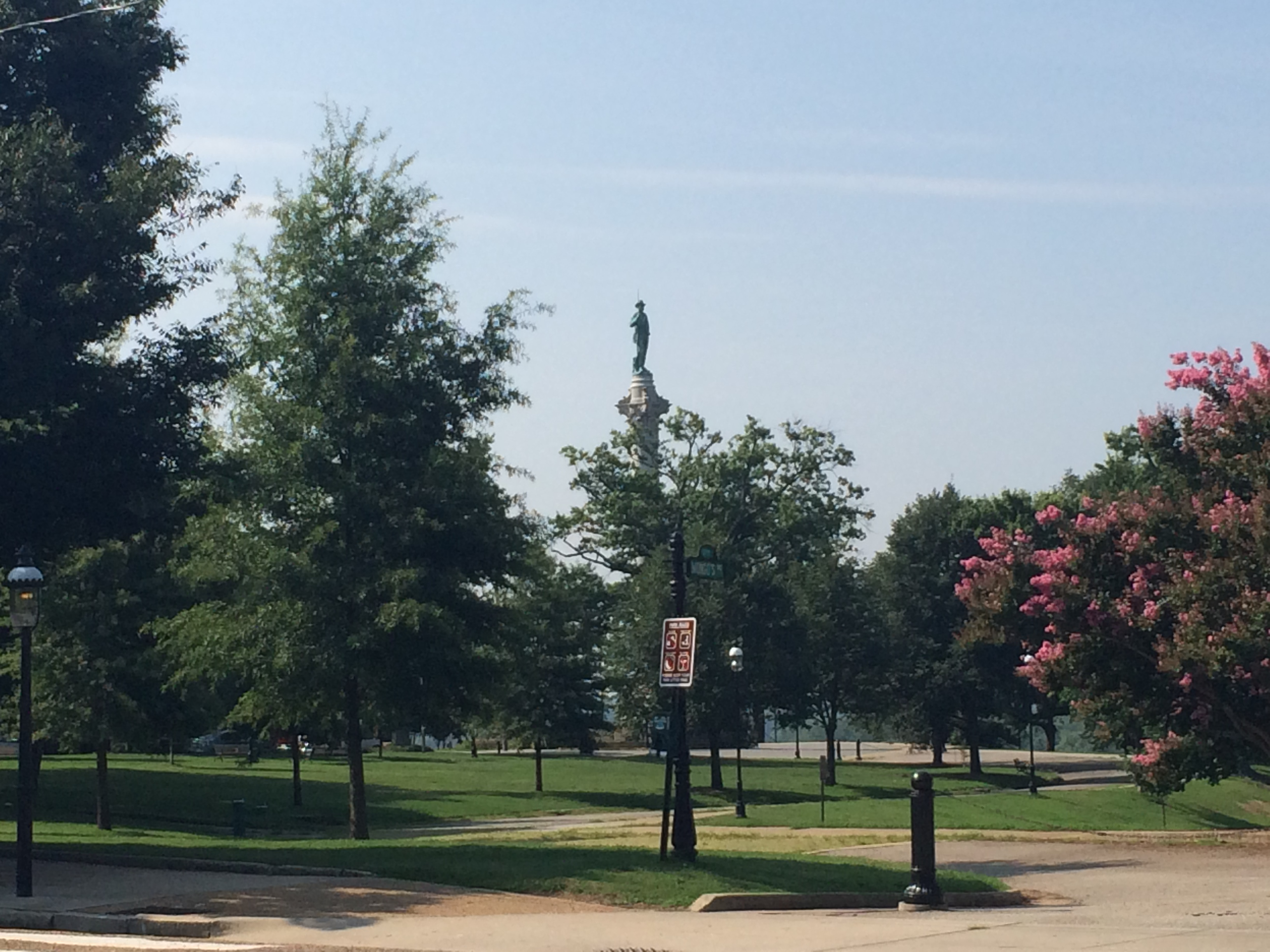
Libby Hill Park

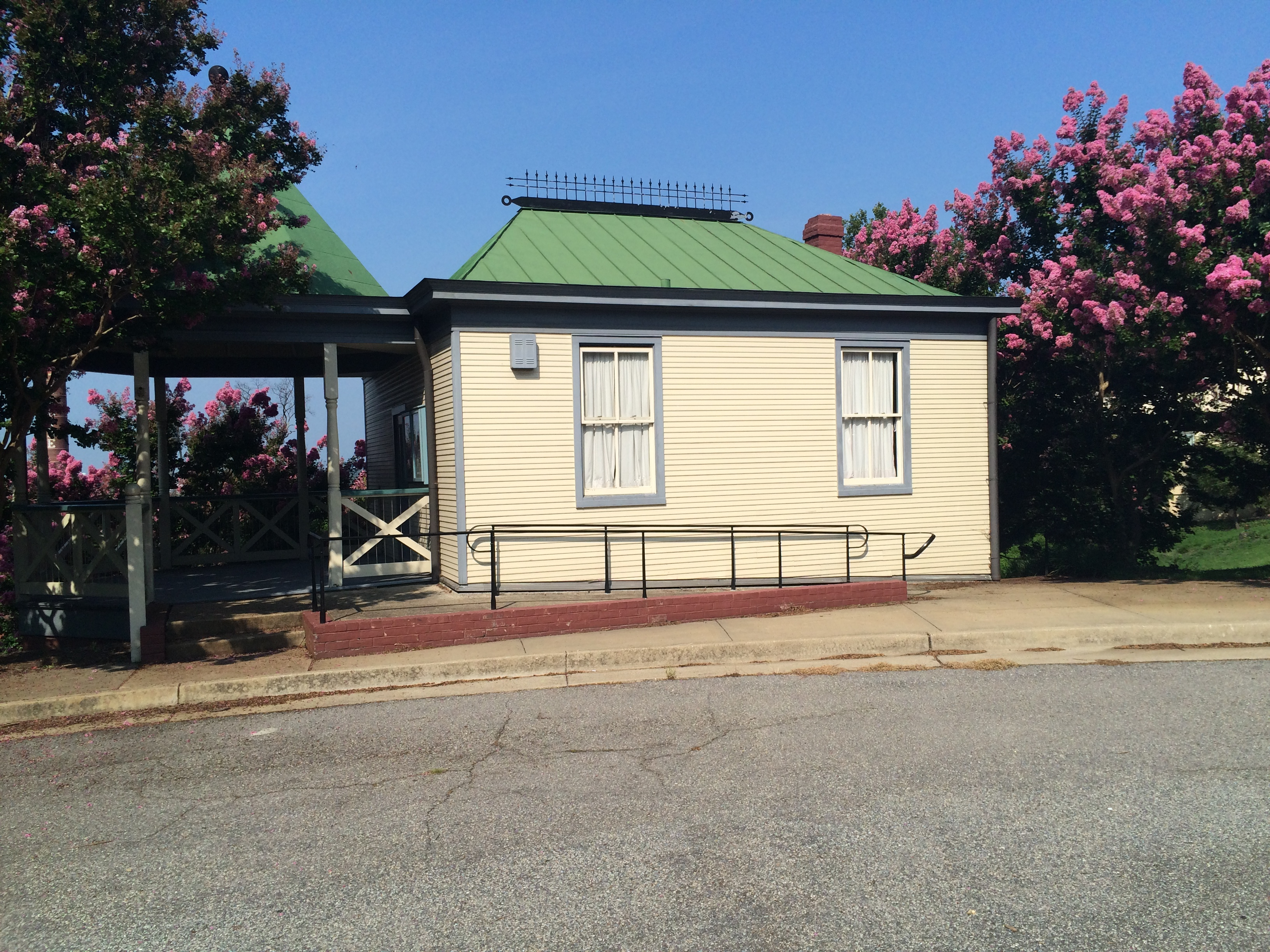
Libby Hill Park house

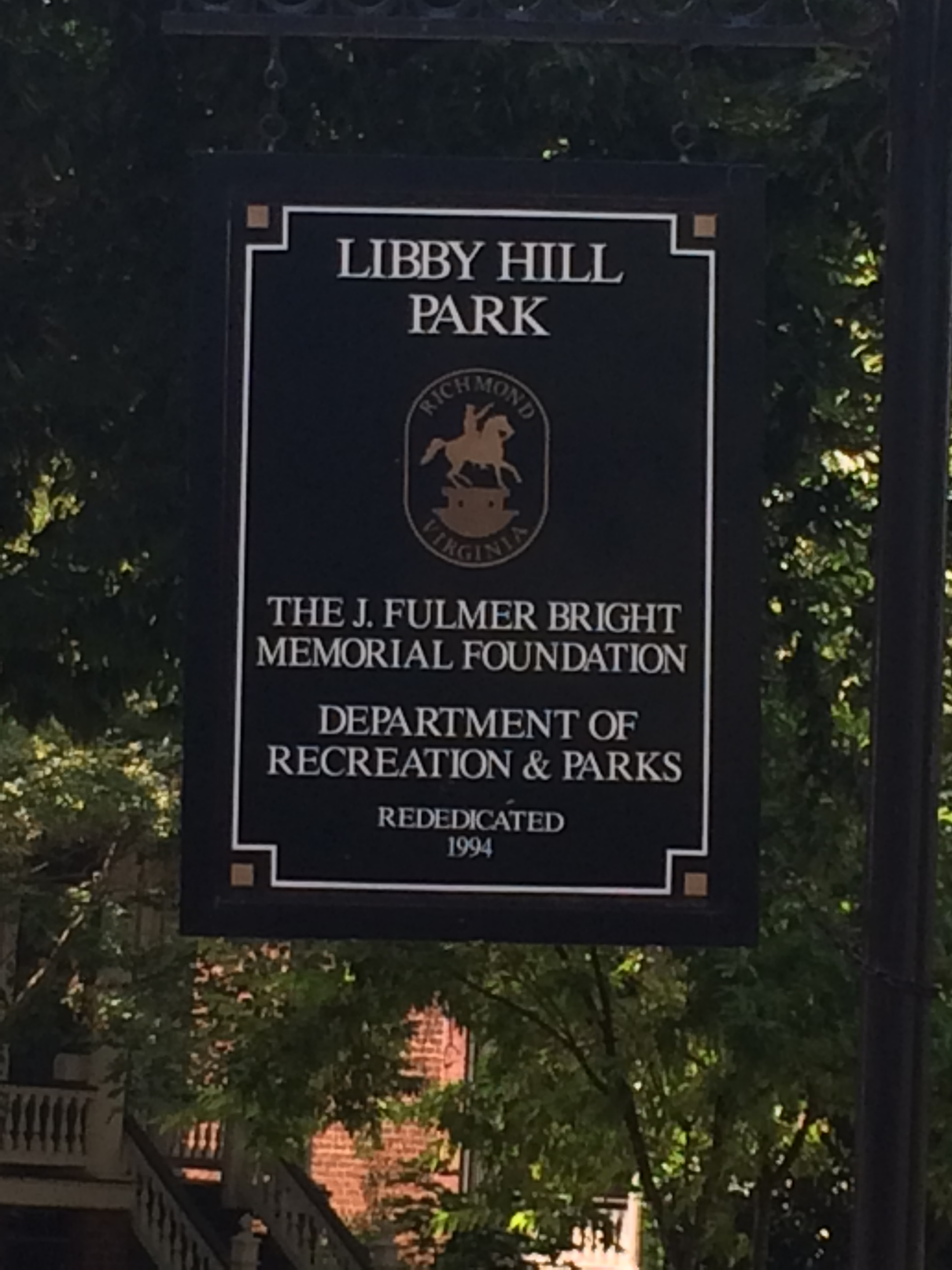
Sign for Libby Hill Park

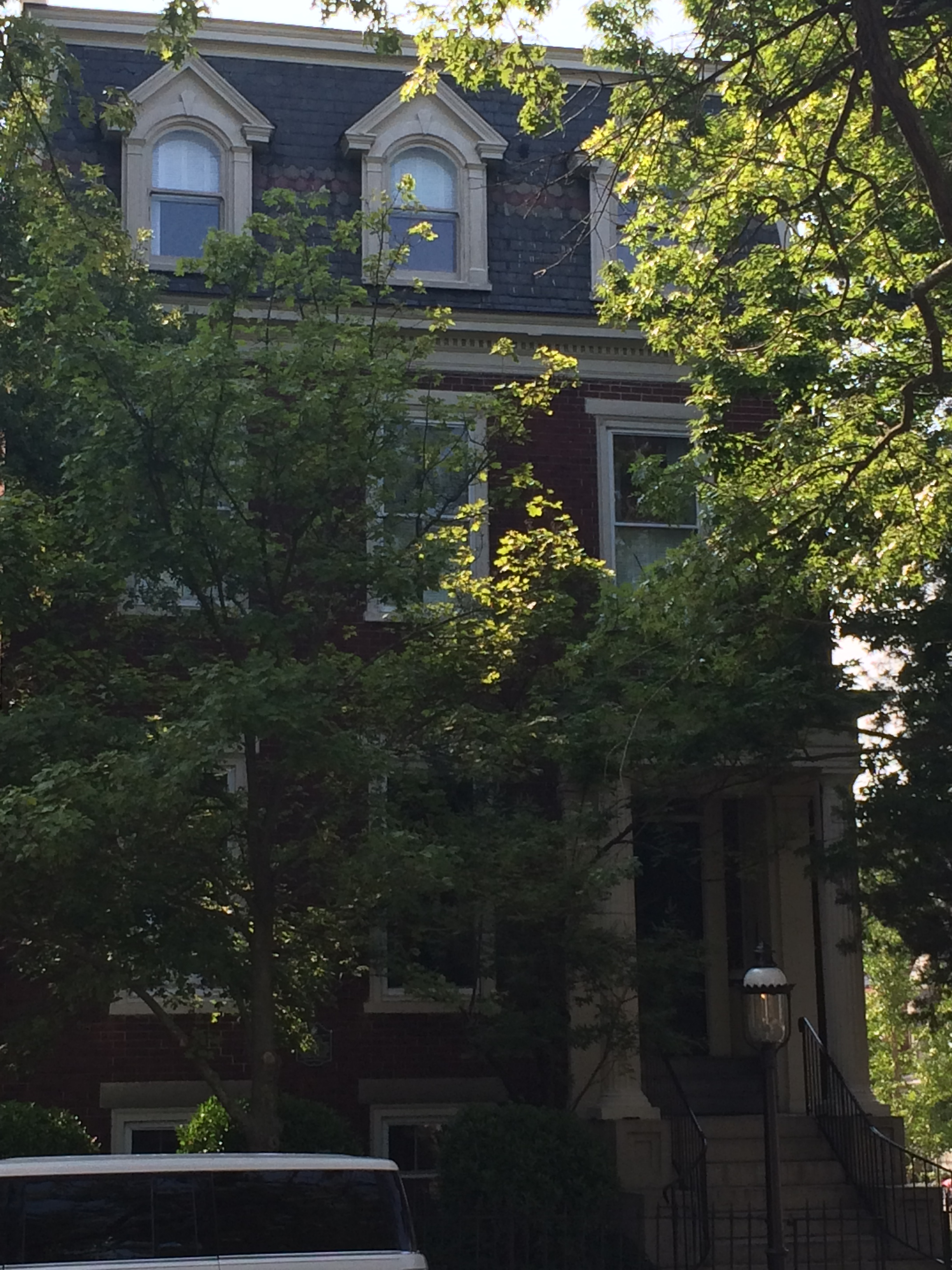
Libby-Powers House

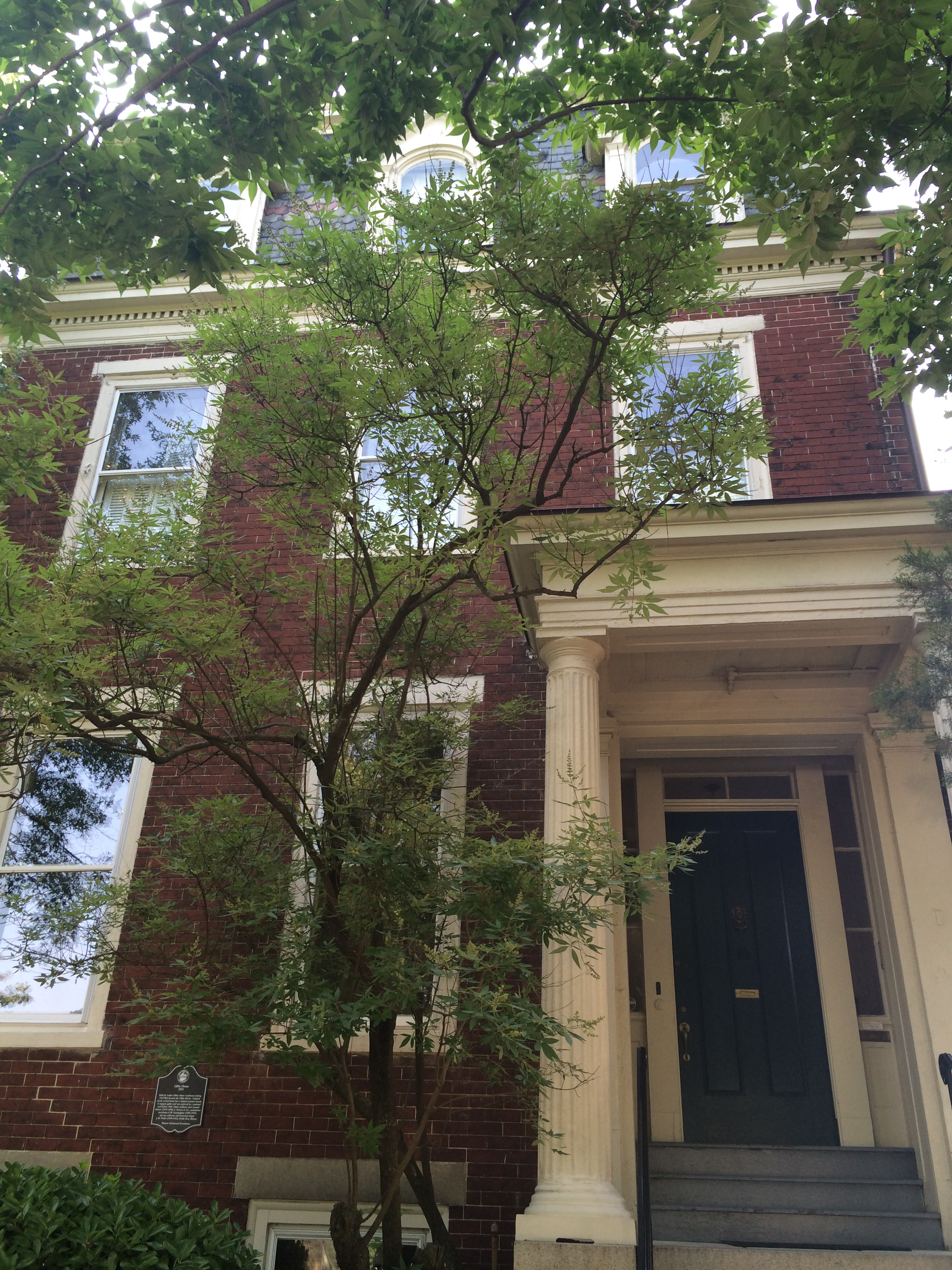
Another view of the Libby-Powers House

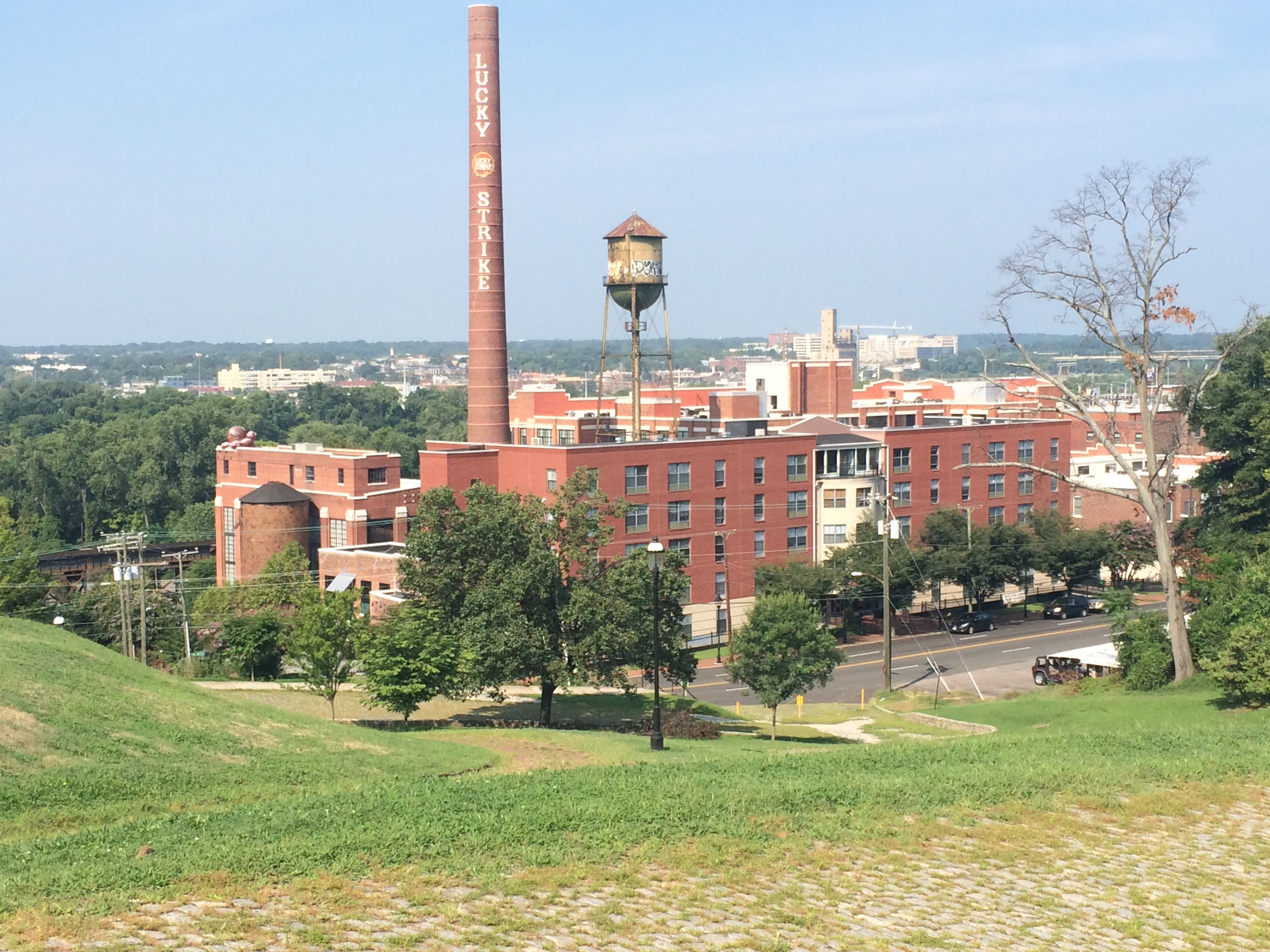
Lucky Strike Factory (now lofted) as seen from Libby Hill

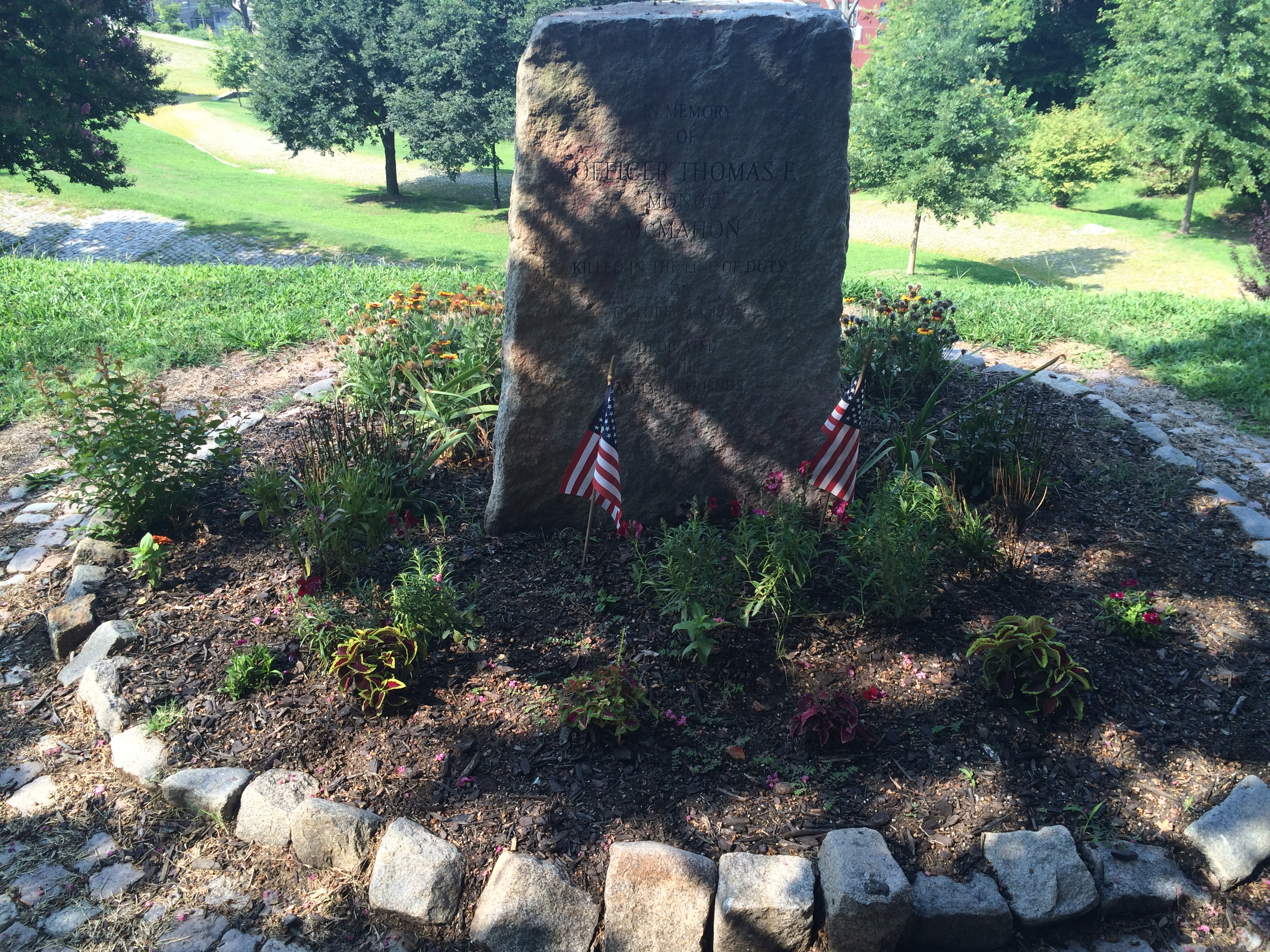
Officer Thomas E McMahon Memorial in Libby Hill Park

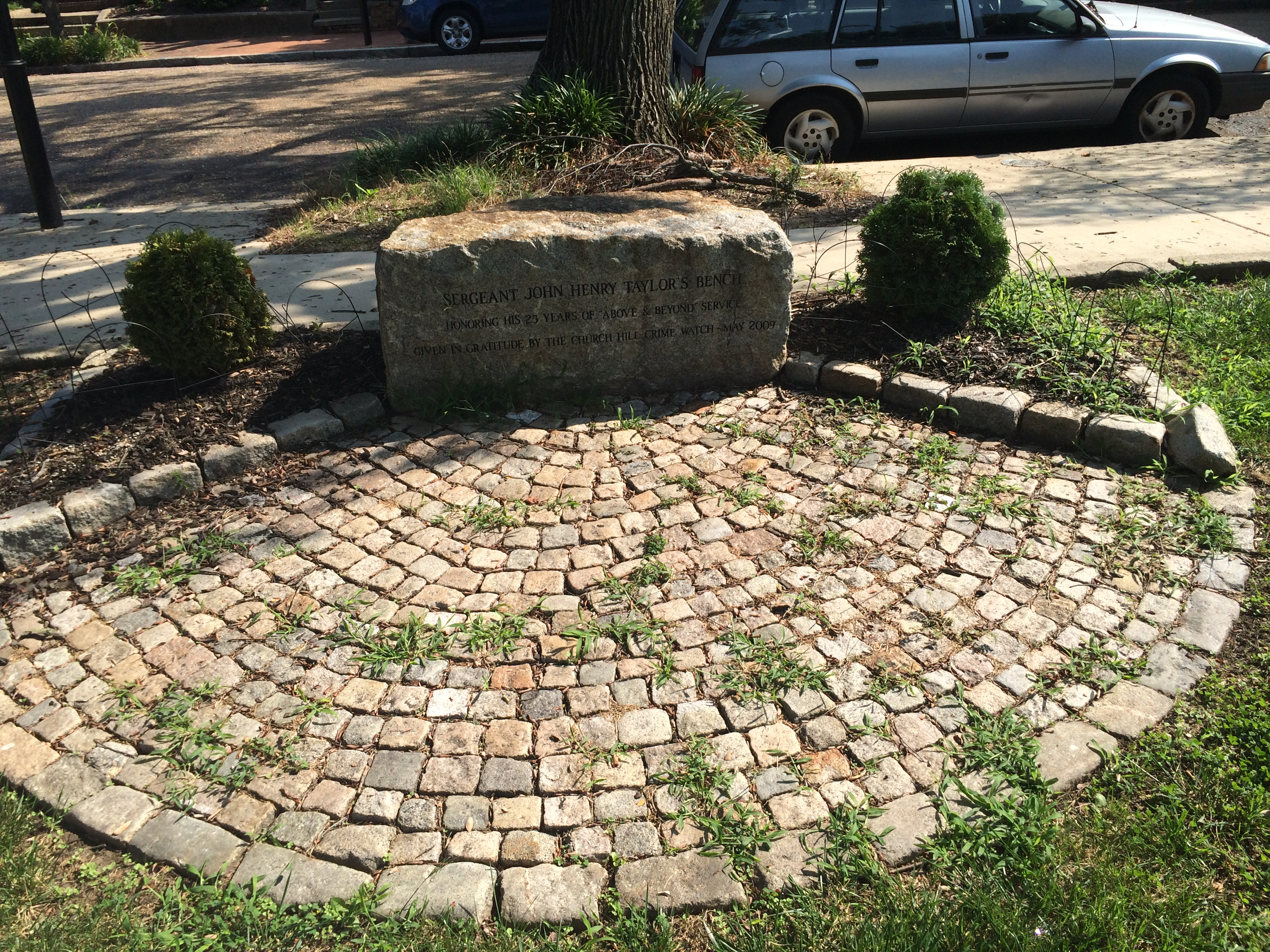
Sergeant John Henry Thomas's Bench in Libby Hill Park

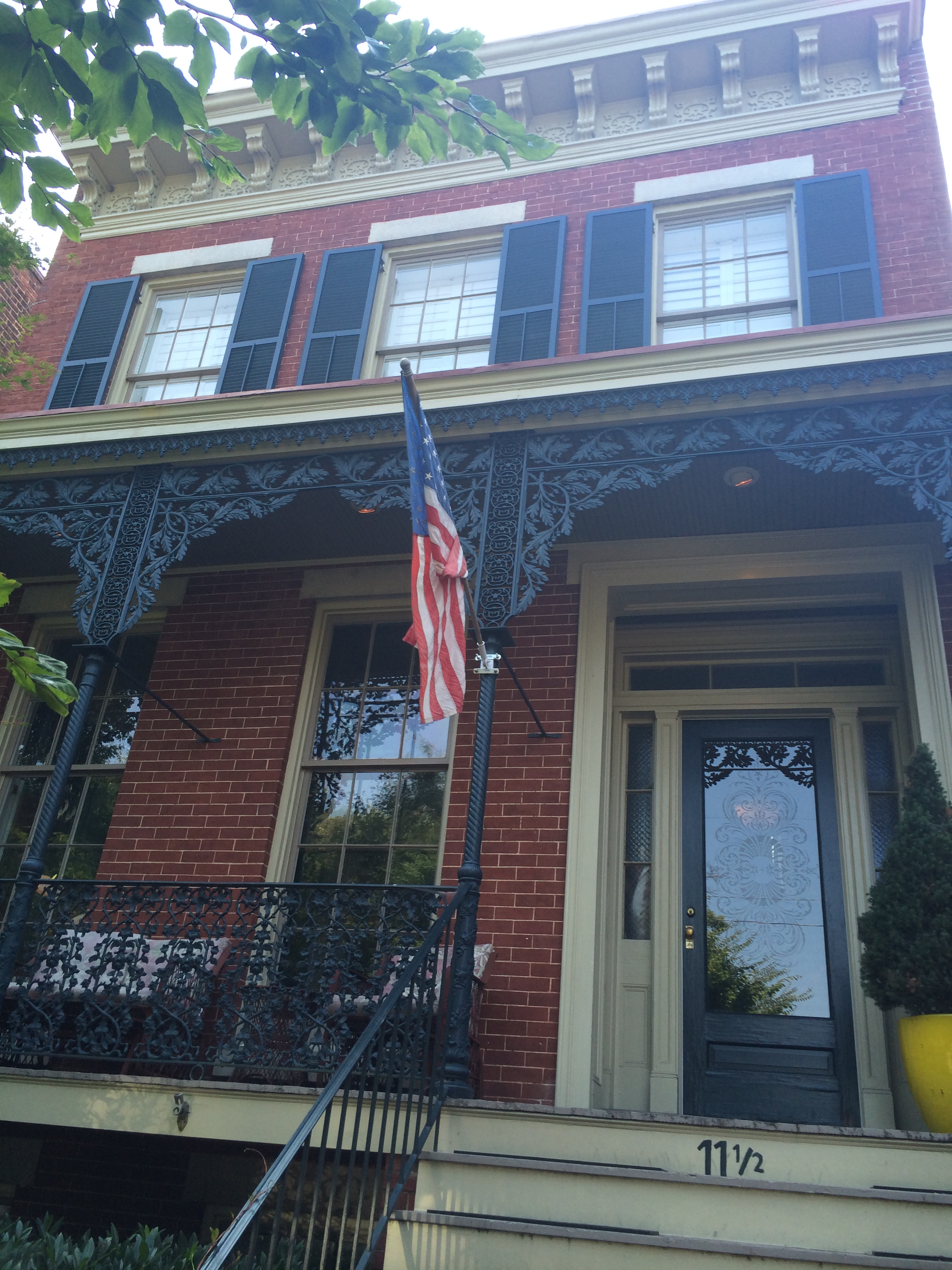
House at 11 1/2 N. 29th St.

== See also ==
- Libby Prison
- Richmond, Virginia
- Armitage Manufacturing Company
- Neighborhoods of Richmond, Virginia
