= Historic Richmond Foundation =

Historic preservation non-profit in Richmond, Virginia

- Founded: 1956
- Founder: Elisabeth Scott Bocock, Louise Catterall, Mary Wingfield Scott, Dr. Wyndham B. Blanton, and others
- Tax ID no.: 54-6026404
- Purpose: Historic preservation
- Location: 4 East Main Street, Suite 1C, Richmond, VA 23219
- Region served: Richmond, Virginia
- Product: Historic Preservation in Richmond, VA
- Key people: Cyane Crump, Executive Director;
- Website: http://www.historicrichmond.com/

Historic Richmond Foundation was founded in 1956 by Elisabeth Scott Bocock, Louise Catterall, Mary Wingfield Scott, Dr. Wyndham B. Blanton, and others in order to save the Church Hill area surrounding St. John's Church. The mission of Historic Richmond is "to shape the future of Richmond by preserving our distinctive historic character, sparking revitalization and championing our important architectural legacy".

== Preservation ==
Through the years, it has saved numerous buildings in Richmond through the application of its revolving fund, including: the Adam Craig House in Shockoe Bottom, the Church Hill neighborhood in Richmond, Virginia that surrounds St. John's Church, the Ellen Glasgow House, the National Theater, the Elmira Shelton House, Old City Hall and Monumental Church. In addition, it has championed the preservation of numerous Richmond neighborhoods including Union Hill, the Fan District, Springhill, Oregon Hill, Monument Avenue and Windsor Farms. In 2005, it merged with the William Byrd Branch of Preservation Virginia (formerly known as the Association for the Preservation of Virginia Antiquities). It remains a separate 501(c)(3) non-profit, though it maintains an affiliation with Preservation Virginia through joint memberships and other cooperative programs.

== Current projects ==
Current restoration projects include the 19th century Monumental Church in Court End and St. John's Mews in Church Hill.

Historic Richmond's Executive Director is Cyane Crump. In 2000, the organization moved to the William C. Allen Double House (1836) at 4-6 East Main Street, where it maintains its headquarters today.
