= WRVA Building =

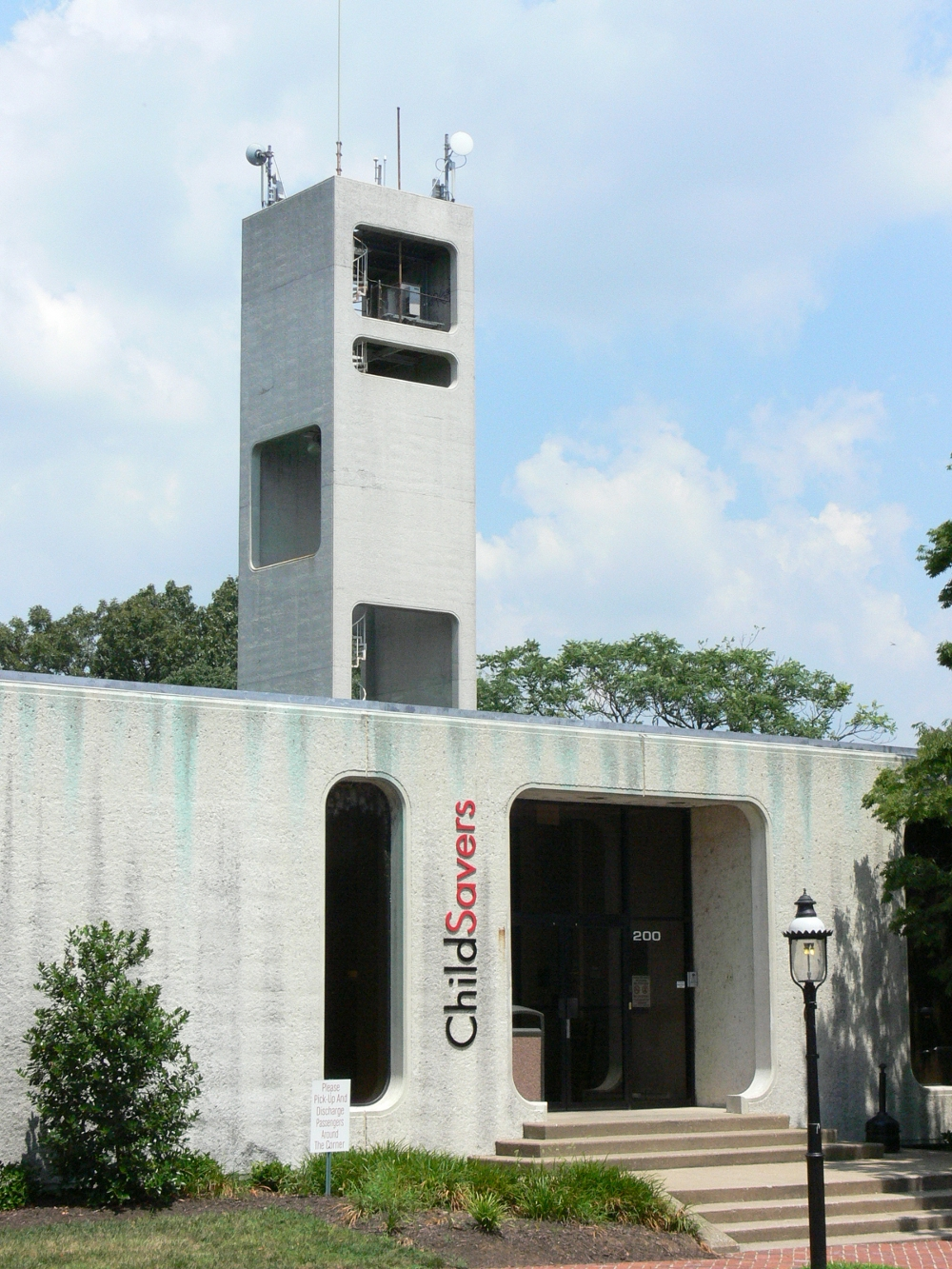
- Interactive map of the WRVA Building area

General information
- Architectural style: Modernism
- Location: 200 North 22nd Street, Church Hill district, Richmond, Virginia
- Coordinates: 37°31′58″N 77°25′20.3″W
- Completed: 1968

Design and construction
- Architect: Philip Johnson

The WRVA Building is an 18,000-square-foot (1,700 m^{2}) building located at 200 N. 22nd St. in the historic Church Hill district of Richmond, Virginia. Designed by world-renowned architect Philip Johnson while he was at the architectural firm of Budina and Freeman, it was originally built to house WRVA (AM), one of Virginia's first broadcast radio stations. The building is considered "one of the city's most visible and important mid-20th-century architectural landmarks." ChildSavers, a Richmond nonprofit child services agency, is the current occupant.

== Renovation ==
From 2007 until 2008, the WRVA Building underwent an extensive $5.4 million renovation for use by ChildSavers. Baskervill, a Richmond architecture firm, designed its adaptive reuse, making few structural changes.
