= Liberty or death =

Liberty or death, Independence or death, Freedom or death or similar phrases may refer to:

== Patriotic slogans ==
- Eleftheria i thanatos (lit. 'Freedom or death'), national motto of Greece
- "Give me liberty or give me death!", attributed to American orator Patrick Henry in 1775
- The Culpeper Minutemen had "Liberty or death" on their flag
- Independência ou morte (lit. 'Independence or death'), motto of the Empire of Brazil (1822–1889)
- Libertad o Muerte (lit. 'Freedom or Death'), national motto of Uruguay
- Sloboda ili smrt (lit. 'Freedom or death'), motto of the Serbian/Yugoslav Chetniks
- Viața-n libertate ori moarte! (lit. 'Life in freedom or death!'), a shout proclaimed in Deșteaptă-te, române!, the national anthem of Romania
- Svoboda ili smart (lit. 'Freedom or death'), a slogan used by the early Bulgarian revolutionaries; the same slogan was later used by various regional Bulgarian komitadjis
- Ya istiklâl ya ölüm (lit. 'Either independence or death'), a national motto of Turkey
- Merdeka atau Mati! (lit. 'Independence or Death!'), a slogan / quote by Bung Tomo during the Indonesian National Revolution.
- Marşo ya joƶalla (lit. 'Freedom or death'), motto of the Sheikh Mansur Battalion
- Volia abo smert (lit. 'Freedom or death'), motto of Ukraine
- Azatut'yun kam mah (lit. 'Freedom or death'), motto of the Armenian Revolutionary Federation
- Patria o Muerte (Homeland or Death) revolutionary slogan and national motto of Cuba

== Other uses ==
- GNU General Public License#Version 2, nicknamed "Liberty or Death"
- Liberty or Death (album), by Grave Digger, 2007
- Liberty or Death (video game), 1993
- Freedom or Death, a 1913 speech made by English militant feminist Emmeline Pankhurst
- Independence or Death, by Pedro Américo, 1888
- Troutman flag, with the words "Liberty or Death", used by the Georgia battalion during Texas revolution
- "Tod oder Freiheit" (lit. 'Death or Liberty'), a quotation from the play The Robbers (Die Räuber) by Friedrich Schiller

== See also ==
- Give Me Liberty (disambiguation)
- Socialism or Barbarism (disambiguation)
- List of national mottos
- Captain Michalis, or Freedom or Death, a 1953 novel by Nikos Kazantzakis
- Liberté, égalité, fraternité, the national motto of France and the Republic of Haiti
- Live Free or Die, the state motto of New Hampshire, United States
- Join, or Die
- Samuel Sharpe, an enslaved Jamaican, who said "I would rather die among yonder gallows, than live in slavery."
