= David C. Richardson (Virginia politician) =

American soldier and politician (1845–1928)

David Crockett Richardson (June 7, 1845 – October 4, 1928) was a Confederate soldier and later the mayor of Richmond, Virginia from 1908 to 1912.

Richardson was Richmond Police Justice from 1880 to 1888. He was the chair and president of the association responsible for the Confederate Soldiers and Sailors Monument unveiled in 1894. He was director of the Richmond Chamber of Commerce from 1906 to 1908. He became president of the Virginia Bar Association in 1907.
