= Carlton McCarthy =

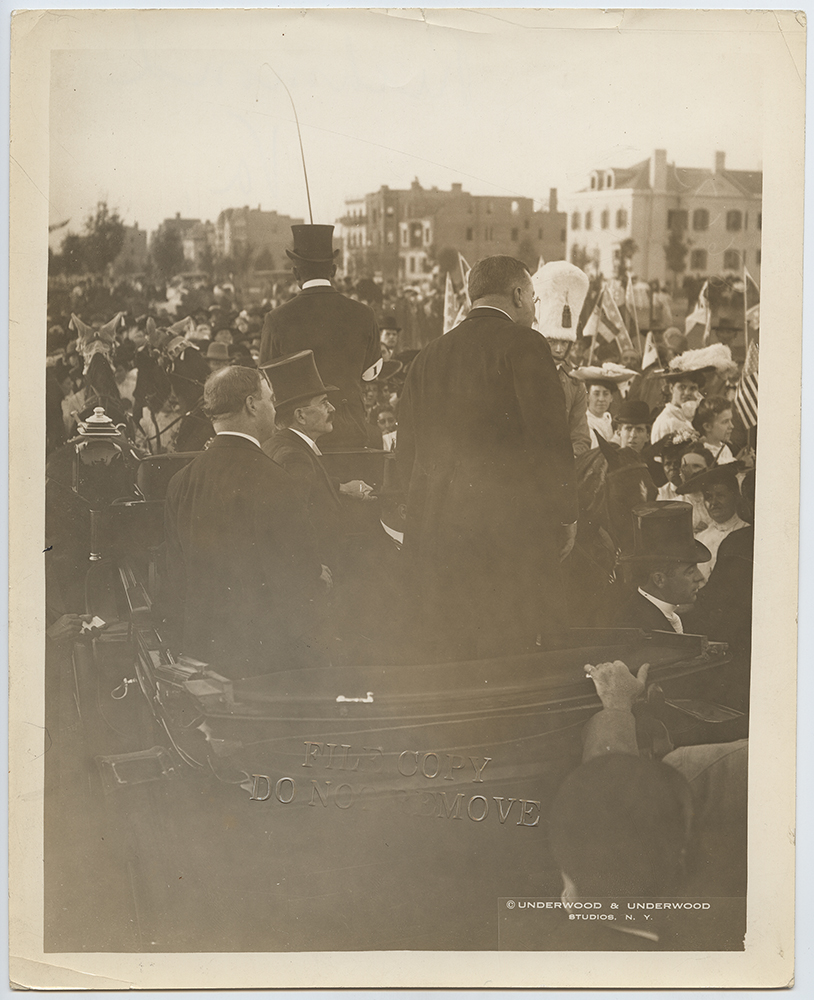
- President Theodore Roosevelt standing in a carriage, in Richmond, Virginia. In the carriage, from left to right, are Andrew Jackson Montague, Governor of Virginia, Carlton McCarthy, Mayor of Richmond, William Loeb, Jr., Presidential Secretary, and President Theodore Roosevelt. On October 18, 1905, President Theodore Roosevelt made several speeches in Richmond, Virginia, including one at the Capital Square.

Mayor of Richmond (Virginia, United States)
- In office 1904–1908

Carlton McCarthy (1847–1936) was the mayor of Richmond (Virginia, United States) from 1904 to 1908.

== Civil War writings ==
Prior to this, he served as a soldier in the Confederate Army. He fought in local armies but was not formally enlisted private until 1864 in the Richmond Howitzers of the Army of Northern Virginia. He wrote a book about his four years of Civil War experience called Detailed Minutiae of Soldier Life in the Army of Northern Virginia 1861-1865, first published by Carlton McCarthy and Company in 1882 with a second edition published in 1888. A copy of this book is on display at the Museum of the Confederacy as well as at the Virginia Historical Society.

His writings have been featured in other publications, such as chapter 6 of The Civil War Soldier: A Historical Reader by Michael Barton, Larry M. Logue and a chapter in Albert Bushnell Hart's book, The Romance of the Civil War, published in 1896 and now in the public domain.

== Biographies ==
Mary Holt Carlton wrote a book about Carlton in 1986, called Richmond's `Live Wire' Mayor 1904-1908.

McCarthy died in 1936 at the age of 89.

== Civic contributions ==
Besides being Richmond's elected mayor from 1904 to 1908, McCarthy also made other contributions to Richmond life, such as being the primary author of a 1914 ordinance to adopt a Richmond flag.

McCarthy also authored a book in 1871 (published by McCarthy & Ellyson) entitled Walks about Richmond: a story for boys, and a guide to persons visiting the city, desiring to see the principal points of interest.

In 1894, McCarthy was the orator at the unveiling of Richmond's Confederate Soldiers and Sailors Monument.
