= Armitage Manufacturing Company =

Historic building in Virginia, US

- U.S. National Register of Historic Places
- Virginia Landmarks Register
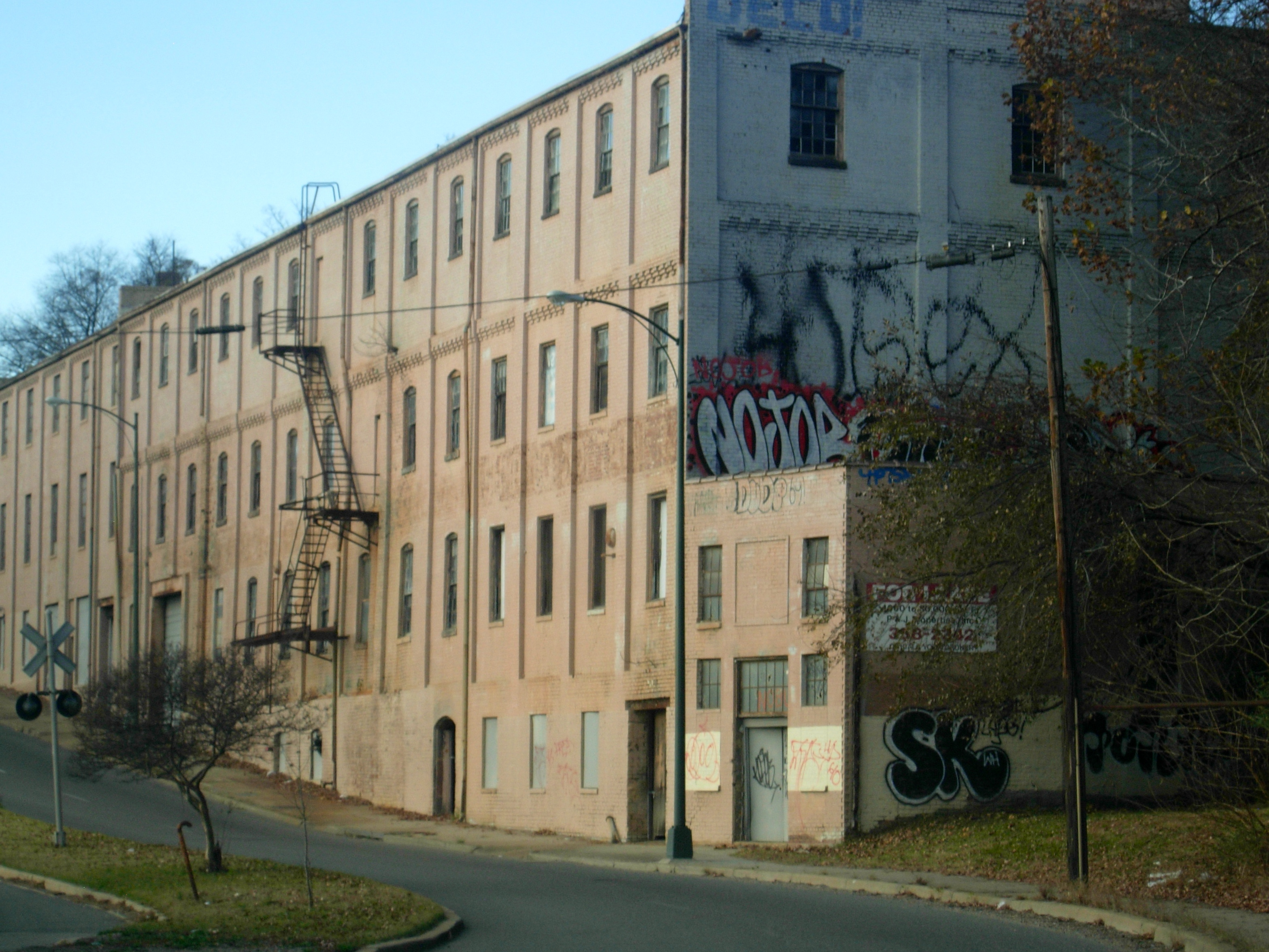
- Armitage Manufacturing Company, November 2013

- Location within Virginia Location within the United States
- Location: 3200 Williamsburg Ave., Richmond, Virginia
- Coordinates: 37°31′31″N 77°24′55″W
- Area: 4.56 acres (1.85 ha)
- Built: 1900, 1924, 1928, 1954
- Architect: Noland & Baskervill
- NRHP reference No.: 12000545
- VLR No.: 127-6693

Significant dates
- Added to NRHP: August 22, 2012
- Designated VLR: June 21, 2012

Armitage Manufacturing Company, also known as Fibre Board Container Company, is a historic factory building located in Richmond, Virginia. The original section was built in 1900, and is a two-story, brick building; a third story was added in 1924. Around 1928, a three-story extension was constructed at the rear of the front wing. In 1954, a large barrel-roofed, metal bowstring truss wing was added. It was constructed for the production of building supplies and roofing paper, and then used for corrugated container manufacturing. The building is used as a warehouse.

It was listed on the National Register of Historic Places in 2012.
