= Give me liberty or give me death! =

1775 quotation attributed to Patrick Henry

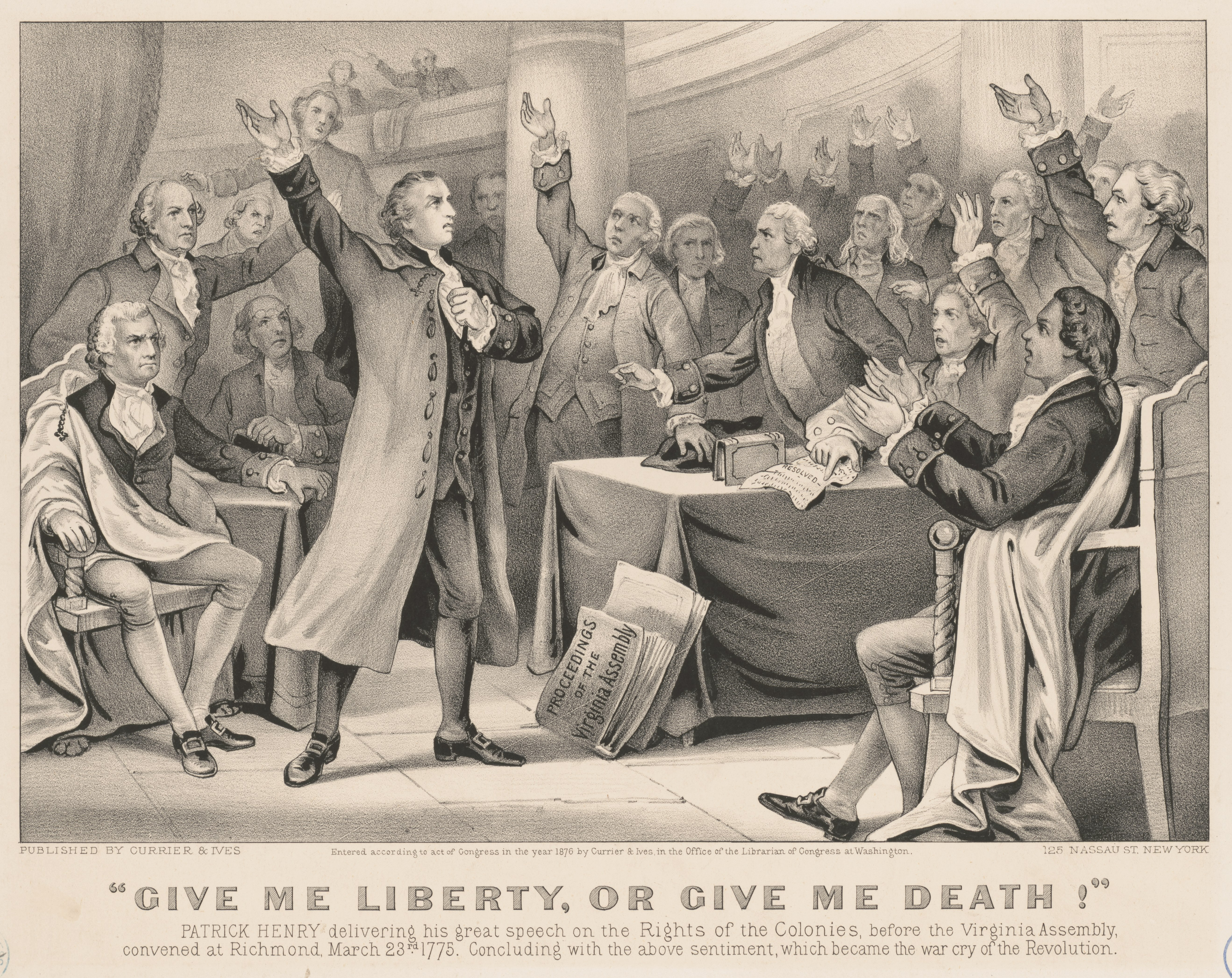
Patrick Henry's 1775 "Give me liberty, or give me death!" speech, depicted in an 1876 lithograph by Currier and Ives now housed in the Library of Congress in Washington, D.C.

"Give me liberty or give me death!" is a quotation attributed to American politician and orator Patrick Henry from a speech he made to the Second Virginia Convention on March 23, 1775, at St. John's Church in Richmond, Virginia. Henry is known for having swung the balance in convincing the convention to pass a resolution delivering Virginian troops for the Revolutionary War. Among the delegates to the convention were future United States presidents George Washington and Thomas Jefferson.

Over forty years after Patrick Henry delivered his speech and eighteen years after his death, biographer William Wirt published a posthumous reconstruction of the speech in his 1817 work Sketches of the Life and Character of Patrick Henry. This is the version of the speech as it is widely known today and was reconstructed based on the recollections of elderly witnesses many decades later. A scholarly debate persists among colonial historians as to what extent Wirt or others invented parts of the speech, including its famous closing words.

== Background and speech ==
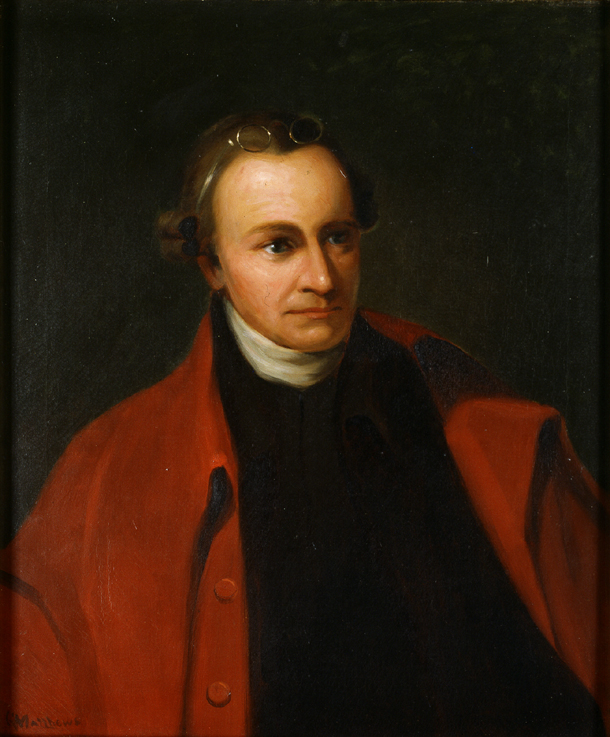
Portrait by George Bagby Matthews after Thomas Sully, c. 1891

The Second Virginia Convention met at St. John's Episcopal Church in Richmond, Virginia, on March 20, 1775. Delegates selected a presiding officer, and they elected delegates to the Continental Congress. At the convention, Patrick Henry—a delegate from Hanover County—offered amendments to raise a militia independent of royal authority in terms that explicitly recognized that war with the British Empire was inevitable, sparking the opposition of convention moderates. On March 23, Henry defended his amendments and purportedly concluded with the following statement:

"Give Me Liberty or Give Me Death"
Read by Bob Gonzalez for LibriVox
Audio 00:08:51 (full text)

If we were base enough to desire it, it is now too late to retire from the contest. There is no retreat but in submission and slavery! Our chains are forged! Their clanking may be heard on the plains of Boston! The war is inevitable and let it come! I repeat it, sir, let it come. It is in vain, sir, to extenuate the matter. Gentlemen may cry, Peace, Peace but there is no peace. The war is actually begun! The next gale that sweeps from the north will bring to our ears the clash of resounding arms! Our brethren are already in the field! Why stand we here idle? What is it that gentlemen wish? What would they have? Is life so dear, or peace so sweet, as to be purchased at the price of chains and slavery? Forbid it, Almighty God! I know not what course others may take; but as for me, give me liberty or give me death!

As he concluded, Henry plunged a bone paper knife towards his chest in imitation of the Roman patriot Cato the Younger.

== Reception and aftermath ==
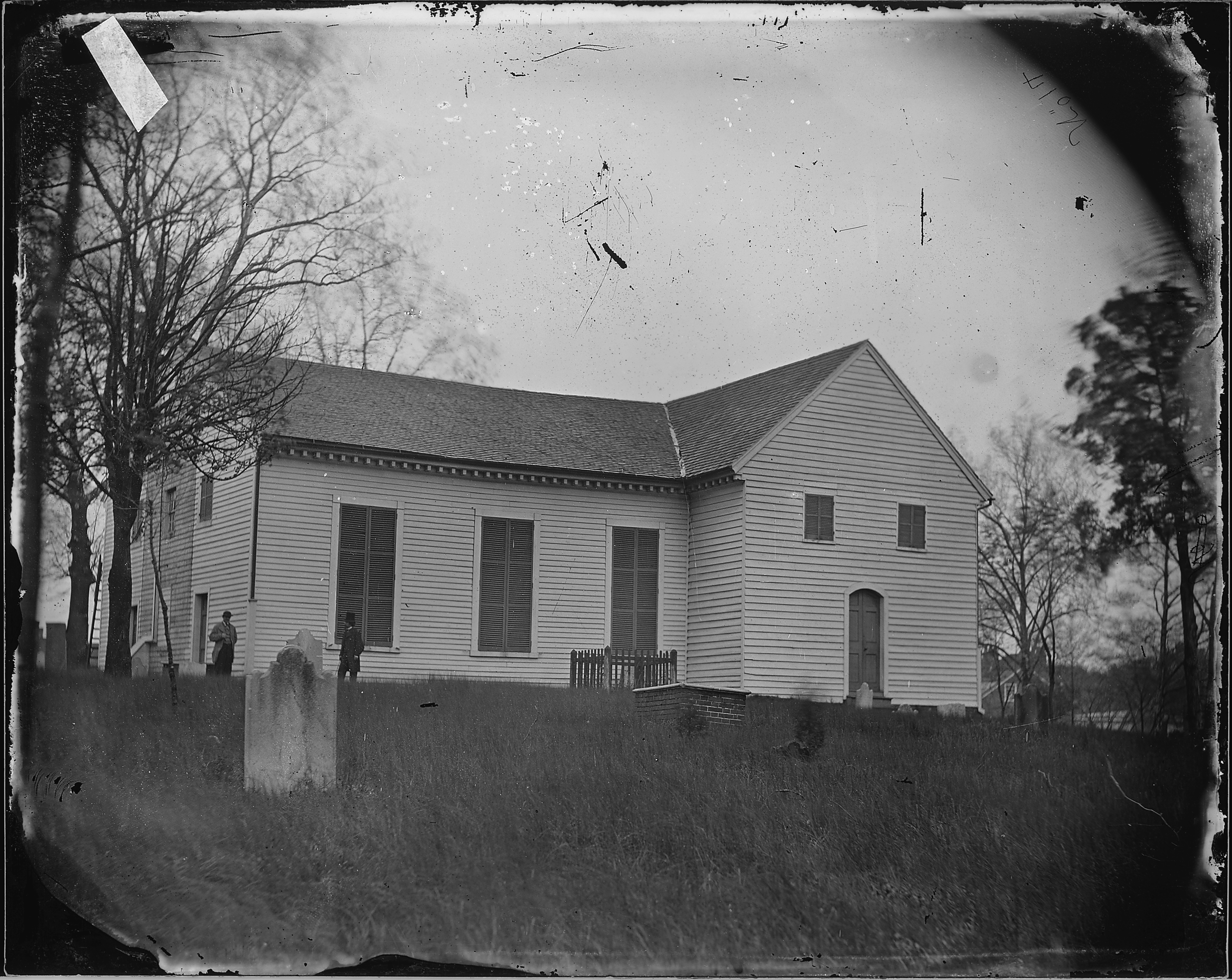
St. John's Church, Richmond, where Patrick Henry delivered the speech

According to Edmund Randolph, the convention sat in profound silence for several minutes after Henry's speech ended. George Mason, who later drafted the Virginia Declaration of Rights, said that the audience's passions were not their own after Henry had addressed them. Thomas Marshall told his son John Marshall, who later became Chief Justice of the United States, that the speech was "one of the boldest, vehement, and animated pieces of eloquence that had ever been delivered." Edward Carrington, listening by a window, was so affected by the speech that he requested to be buried there, and was after his death in 1810.

Henry's speech ultimately swayed the convention, and it was resolved that the colony be "put into a posture of defence: and that Patrick Henry, Richard Henry Lee, Robert Carter Nicholas, Benjamin Harrison, Lemuel Riddick, George Washington, Adam Stephen, Andrew Lewis, William Christian, Edmund Pendleton, Thomas Jefferson and Isaac Zane, Esquires, be a committee to prepare a plan for the embodying arming and disciplining such a number of men as may be sufficient for that purpose." Despite this resolution, many moderate delegates remained uncertain where the resistance urged by Henry and other radicals would lead, and few counties formed independent militia companies at the urging of the convention. Nevertheless, Henry was named as chairman of the committee assigned to build a militia.

A month later, Lord Dunmore, the governor of Virginia, ordered Royal Navy sailors to remove all stocks of gunpowder from the powder magazine at Williamsburg, Virginia. This flashpoint—later known as the Gunpowder Incident—became Virginia's equivalent of the Battle of Lexington. Upon learning of Dunmore's decision, Patrick Henry led his militia toward Williamsburg to force return of the gunpowder to the colony. The stand-off was resolved without conflict when a payment of £330 (equal to £46,091 today) was made to Henry. Fearing for his safety, Dunmore retreated to a naval vessel, ending royal control of the colony. Henry became the independent state's first governor in July 1776.

== Publication and controversy ==
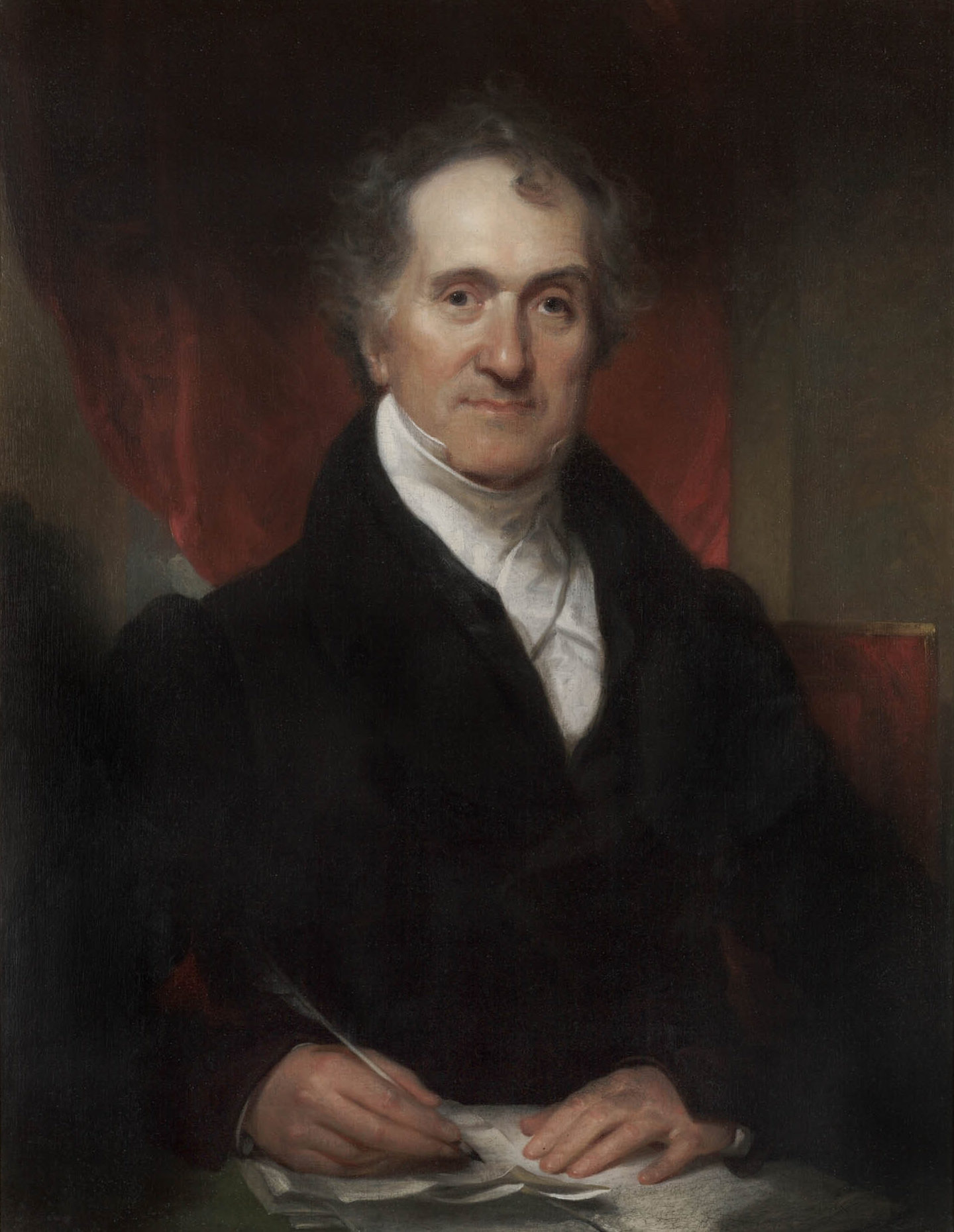
William Wirt, c. 1832

Over 40 years after Patrick Henry delivered his speech and 18 years after Henry's death, a reconstruction of the speech was printed in Wirt's 1817 biography Sketches of the Life and Character of Patrick Henry. Wirt corresponded with elderly men who had heard the speech in their youth as well as others who were acquainted with people who were there at the time. All concurred Henry's speech had produced a profound effect upon its audience, but only one surviving witness attempted to reconstruct the actual speech.

St. George Tucker attempted a two-paragraph reconstruction of the speech in a letter to Wirt, but Tucker noted it was "in vain... to give any idea of his speech". Using Tucker's two paragraphs, Wirt "filled in the blanks" and created a speech was far longer in length. The original letter with Tucker's remembrances has been lost.

For 160 years, Wirt's reconstruction of Henry's speech was accepted as fact. In the 1970s, historians began to question the authenticity of Wirt's rendition. According to the only written first-hand account of the speech, Henry's 1775 speech used graphic name-calling which does not appear in Wirt's 1817 rendition. Furthermore, Wirt's reconstruction is devoid of Henry's rhetorical custom of invoking fear of Indian attacks in promoting independence from Britain. Given Wirt's artistic liberties in reconstructing the speech, it is possible Henry never uttered the quotation, "Give me liberty or give me death," and scholars question to what extent the speech we know is the work of Wirt or Tucker.

According to historian Bernard Mayo, most scholars are skeptical of the accuracy of Wirt's rendition of Henry's speech. Nevertheless, "its expressions... seemed to have burned themselves into men's memories. Certainly, its spirit is that of the fiery orator who in 1775 so powerfully influenced Virginians and events leading to American independence."

== Precursors ==
The hand of fate is over us, and Heav'n
Exacts severity from all our thoughts.
It is not now a time to talk of aught
But chains or conquest, liberty or death.

— Cato, a Tragedy (1713), Act II, Scene 4

There had been similar phrases used preceding Henry's speech. The 1320 Declaration of Arbroath made in the context of Scottish independence was a letter to Pope John XXII that contained the line: "It is in truth not for glory, nor riches, nor honours that we are fighting, but for freedom—for that alone, which no honest man gives up but with life itself". It is commonly cited as an inspiration for the Declaration of Independence by many, including Trent Lott in a speech before the United States Senate.

The 1713 play, Cato, a Tragedy, was popular in the American Colonies and well known by the Founding Fathers who frequently quoted from the play. George Washington had the play performed for the Continental Army at Valley Forge. It contains the line, "It is not now time to talk of aught/But chains or conquest, liberty or death" (Act II, Scene 4). The phrase "Liberty or Death" also appears on the Culpeper Minutemen flag of 1775.

In Handel's 1746 oratorio Judas Maccabeus, the hero sings, "Resolve, my sons, on liberty or death."

== Additional usage and other context ==
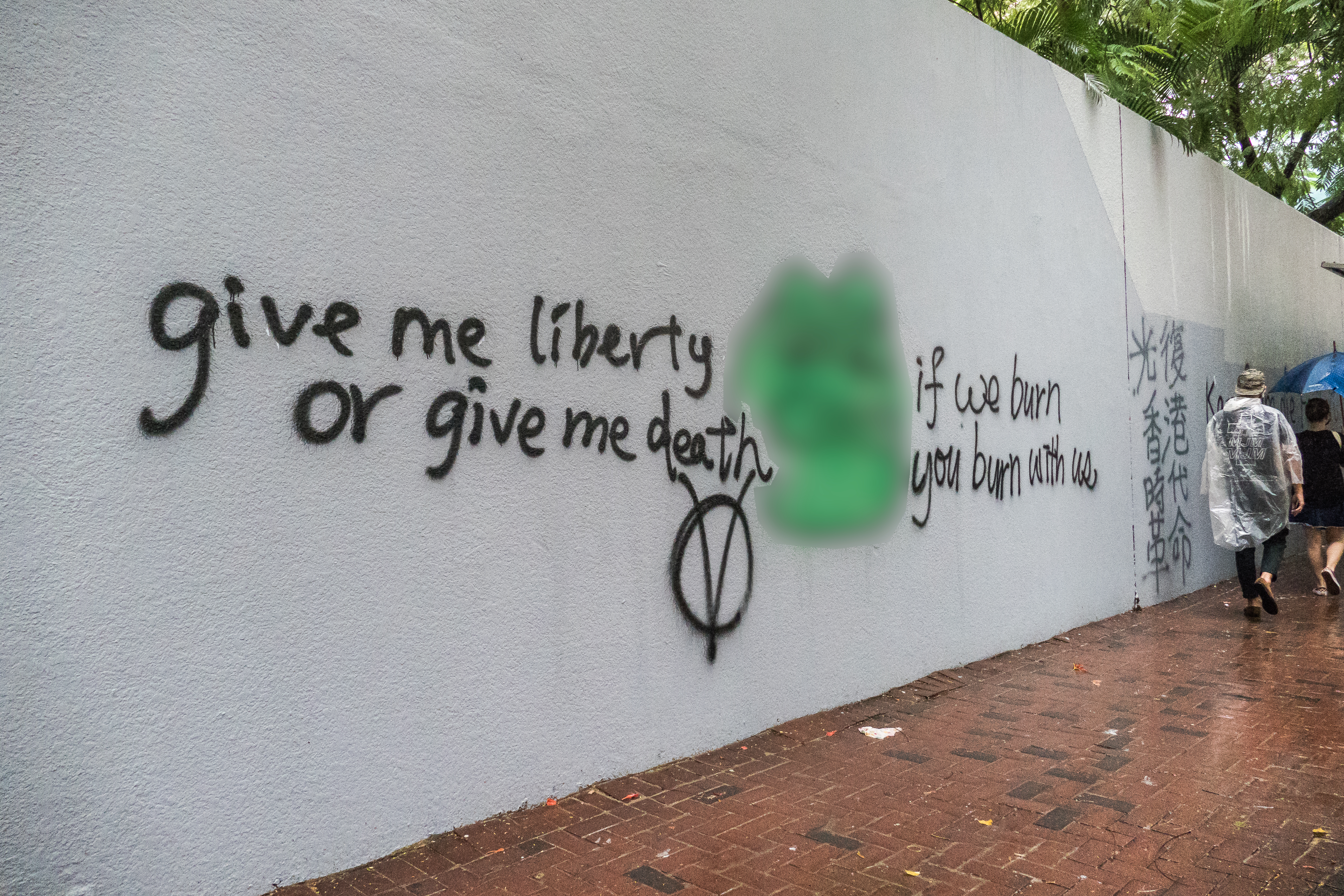
The phrase appearing as graffiti in Hong Kong during the 2019–2020 Hong Kong protests

Phrases equivalent to liberty or death have appeared in a variety of other places. In the summer of 1787, the armed citizens' militia of the Dutch Republic paraded and drilled beneath banners extolling "Liberty or Death". Soon after, amid the French Revolution, the sentence that would become the national motto of France "Liberté égalité fraternité" ("Liberty, equality, fraternity") was sometimes written as "Liberté, égalité, fraternité ou la mort" ("Liberty, equality, fraternity or death").

The Society of United Irishmen in the 1790s and 1800s adopted 'Liberty or Death' as a slogan. During the 1798 rebellion appeals to the population were printed out featuring the heading "Liberty or Death!". It was also a rallying cry of the 1804 Castle Hill convict rebellion in Australia staged by United Irishmen convicts.

During the Greek War of Independence in the 1820s, "Liberty or Death" (Eleftheria i thanatos) became a rallying cry for Greeks who rebelled against Ottoman rule. During this same period, Emperor Pedro I of Brazil purportedly uttered the famous "Cry from [the river] Ipiranga", "Independence or Death" (Independência ou Morte) in 1821, when Brazil was still a colony of Portugal.

The 1833 national anthem of Uruguay, "Orientales, la Patria o la Tumba", contains the line ¡Libertad o con gloria morir! ("Liberty or with glory to die!").

In September 7, 1822, the Brazilian Prince Pedro de Alcãntara proclaimed the separation of Brazil and Portugal saying "Independência ou morte!", thus becoming Emperor of Brazil as Pedro I.

Serbian Chetnik Organization, formed in early 20th Century, had "Sloboda ili smrt/Freedom or Death" as one of its mottos.

During the Russian Civil War, the flag used by Nestor Makhno's anarchist Revolutionary Insurrectionary Army of Ukraine had the dual slogans "Liberty or Death" and "The Land to the Peasants, the Factories to the Workers" embroidered in silver on its two sides.

In March 1941, the motto of the public demonstrations in the Kingdom of Yugoslavia against the signing of a treaty with Nazi Germany was "Better grave than slave" (Bolje grob nego rob).

During the Indonesian National Revolution, the Pemuda ("Youth") used the phrase Merdeka atau Mati ("Freedom or Death").

In the 1964 speech "The Ballot or the Bullet" in Cleveland, Malcolm X said, "It'll be ballots, or it'll be bullets. It'll be liberty, or it will be death. The only difference about this kind of death—it'll be reciprocal."

On 15th March 1965, President Johnson used the phrase when he delivered his "The American Promise" speech on equal voting rights to a joint session of the US Congress. Johnson said "This was the first nation in the history of the world to be founded with a purpose. The great phrases of that purpose still sound in every American heart, North and South. 'All men are created equal', 'government by the consent of the governed', 'give me liberty or give me death'".

In 2012, Ren Jianyu, a Chinese 25-year-old former college student village official, was given a two-year re-education through labor sentence for an online speech against the Chinese Communist Party. A T-shirt of Ren saying "Give me liberty or give me death!" (in Chinese) was presented as evidence of his guilt.

In the 2022 COVID-19 protests in China, a man in Chongqing was filmed giving a speech criticizing harsh lockdown measures, shouting "Give me liberty or give me death!" in Chinese repeatedly to the cheers of onlookers.

== See also ==
- Flag of the Treinta y Tres
- Join, or Die.
- Live Free or Die
- Liberté, égalité, fraternité
- Give Me Liberty (1936 film)
- Give Me Convenience or Give Me Death
