= WGML (AM) =

- Hinesville, Georgia; United States
- Broadcast area: Savannah area
- Frequency: 990 kHz

Programming
- Format: Defunct (was Gospel)

History
- First air date: November 1958
- Call sign meaning: "Give Me Liberty" (Based in Liberty County)

Technical information
- Facility ID: 7815
- Class: D
- Power: 250 watts day 76 watts night
- Transmitter coordinates: 31°51′1.00″N 81°36′4.00″W

WGML (990 AM) was a Christian radio station broadcasting a Gospel format. Licensed to Hinesville, Georgia, United States, it served the Savannah area. The station was last owned by Powerhouse of Deliverance Church, Inc.

== History ==
WGML began as daytime-only broadcaster in November 1958. It was originally owned by the Liberty Broadcasting Company, established by local businessmen Paul Sikes and Roscoe Denmark. During that time, it was the only station that could be heard with a strong signal at Fort Stewart. (Several Savannah stations and a Jacksonville station could be picked up during the daytime with somewhat weaker signals.) In the 1960s, the station offered a mix of middle-of-the-road music and local interest programming. The station underwent numerous format changes, from its original middle-of-the-road programming to pop/rock, country, talk, and its final format of gospel.

WGML ownership changed several times since its inception. Jim Watson, who had become the station's general manager, bought it in 1959. It was subsequently owned by Harris Slotin, a Savannah businessman, who sold it to Dave Steele in the 1970s. It was ultimately purchased by the Powerhouse of Deliverance Church.

The first announcer/manager of WGML was Don Kordecki. In addition to Jim Watson, many local announcers were hired, particularly in its early years. Some of the local personalities were Donald Browning, David (Butch) Fulton, Gary Smiley, Bill Meacham, Dennis Eversoll, Bob Groover, and Brian Steele. Many other local persons have served in various capacities, giving the station a strong local area appeal.

WGML's license was canceled on April 2, 2020, due to the station failing to file an application for renewal of the license by April 1.

In October 2020, a man who appeared to have been having a mental breakdown climbed to the top of the station's radio tower in Hinesville, and was eventually lowered after a several hour standoff with local police and firefighters.
