= St. John's Episcopal Church (Richmond, Virginia) =

Historic church in Virginia, United States

- U.S. National Register of Historic Places
- U.S. National Historic Landmark
- U.S. Historic district – Contributing property
- Virginia Landmarks Register
- Richmond City Historic District
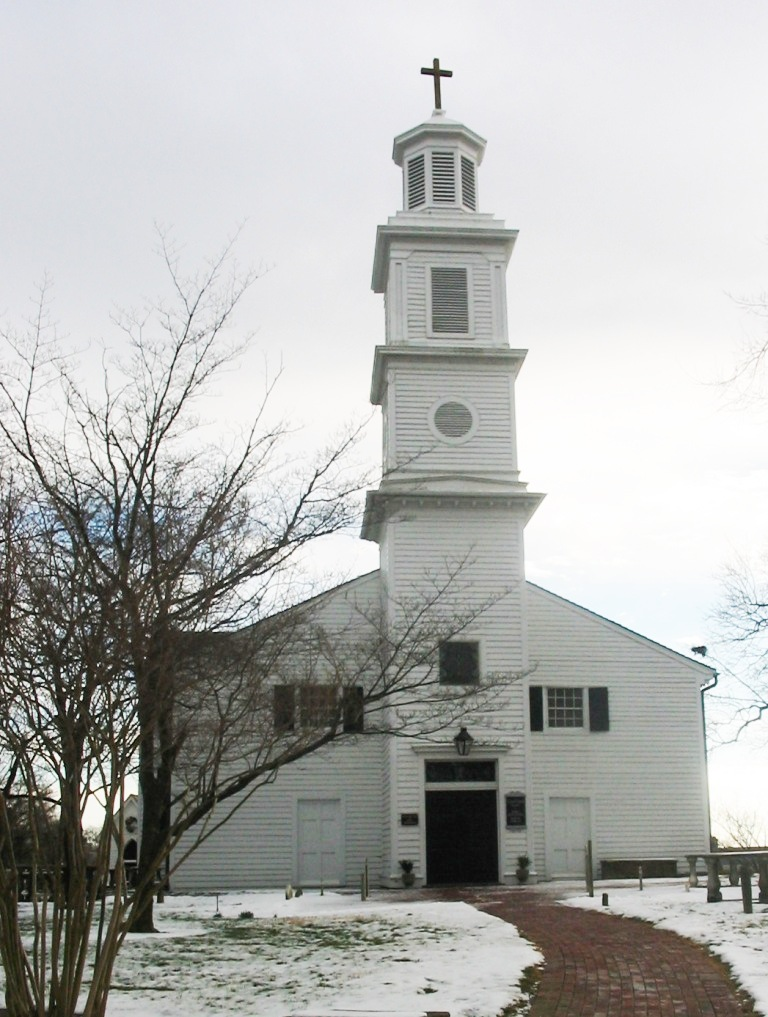
- St. John's Episcopal Church in Richmond, Virginia on a winter day

- Location within Virginia Location within the United States
- Location: Richmond, Virginia
- Coordinates: 37°31′53″N 77°25′11″W
- Built: 1741/1611
- Part of: St. John's Church Historic District (ID70000884)
- NRHP reference No.: 66000920
- VLR No.: 127-0013

Significant dates
- Added to NRHP: October 15, 1966
- Designated NHL: January 20, 1961
- Designated CP: September 15, 1970
- Designated VLR: September 9, 1969

St. John's Church is an Episcopal church located at 2401 East Broad Street in Richmond, Virginia, United States. Formed from several earlier parishes, St. John's is the oldest church in the city of Richmond, Virginia. It was built in 1741 by William Randolph's son, Colonel Richard Randolph; the Church Hill district was named for it. It was the site of two important conventions in the period leading to the American Revolutionary War, and is famous as the location where American Founding Father Patrick Henry gave his memorable speech at the Second Virginia Convention, closing with the often-quoted demand, "Give me liberty or give me death!" The church is designated as a National Historic Landmark.

The church reported 230 members in 2015 and 306 members in 2023; no membership statistics were reported nationally in 2024 parochial reports. Plate and pledge income reported for the congregation in 2024 was $279,732. Average Sunday attendance (ASA) in 2024 was 81 persons. It is a parish of the Episcopal Diocese of Virginia.

== History ==
=== Henricus ===
The earliest precursor of St. John's was Henrico Parish Church, initially located at Sir Thomas Dale's progressive development at Henricus (also known as the "Cittie of Henricus", "Henricopolis" or "Henrico Town"). When the colony was organized, the Anglican Church was the established church of the Crown.

Founded in the Virginia Colony in 1611, Henricus was notable for a number of "firsts". It was the first to allocate land to individuals and the site of the first "College" in colonial Virginia, a school modeled after those in Europe during the 17th century. The College at Henricus was to include education for the children of the Native Americans.

It was at Henricus that colonists held Pocahontas captive; she was the daughter of Chief Powhatan, leader of the Powhatan Confederacy. During the year-long wait, the first rector of the church, Rev. Alexander Whitaker taught her about Christianity and helped her improve her fluency in English. She was baptized as "Rebecca". She married John Rolfe, who established Varina Farms, a plantation across the James River. Rolfe smuggled seeds of sweet Spanish tobacco into Virginia, where it rapidly replaced the much harsher local strains.

Whitaker was drowned in the James River in 1617. His associate, the Reverend William Wickham, held the Henrico Parish Church together awaiting the arrival from England of the Reverend Thomas Bargrave in 1619. Also in 1619, Henricus became located in Henrico Cittie (sic), one of four large "incorporations" or "burroughs" formed by the Virginia Company of London in 1619.

Henricus was an outpost of Jamestown, one of the most westerly settlements at the time. This proved a severe disadvantage on Good Friday in 1622, when the entire development at Henricus and the church were destroyed in the Indian massacre of 1622, in which a third of all colonists in Virginia were killed.

The Virginia Company lost its charter in 1624 and Virginia became a royal colony. Henricus was not rebuilt, but its long-lost site, now located in Chesterfield County (formed from Henrico County in 1749), was discovered in the late 20th century. A county historical park is located there.

=== Varina, Henrico Parish ===
Despite the destruction of Henricus, the colony continued to grow, and a small village developed at Rolfe's Varina Farms Plantation, which became known as Varina (also called "Henrico Parish" in early years). The Shire of Henrico (soon renamed Henrico County) was formed in 1634 as one of the eight original shires of Virginia. The initial county seat was at Varina, which officially became a town in 1680. In those days before separation of church and state, the parish boundaries were the same as those of the county.

Notable among Henrico Parish's leaders was the Reverend Dr. James Blair (1656–1743), who was named Commissary in the Virginia Colony for the Bishop of London, making him the colony's highest-ranking religious leader. At the urging of the House of Burgesses, he became a founder and the first president of the College of William and Mary. In doing so, James Blair used some of the plans of the ill-fated earlier College at Henricus. Apparently taking no chances, the newer College was established at the fortified location of Middle Plantation in James City County, later renamed Williamsburg, to which the capital was later moved from Jamestown. Blair became the rector of Bruton Parish Church there.

Exact locations of the church buildings at Varina are unknown. A third or fourth church building was built a few miles east of Varina Farms on a plantation known as "Curles", some twenty miles east of the present city of Richmond, in the current Varina District of Henrico County. The only relic of that church still surviving is the bowl of the baptismal font, which today is used at St. John's.

=== Richmond, Church Hill ===
Henrico Parish Church moved to Richmond in 1741, and was housed in what is now the Church Hill neighborhood, on land donated by William Byrd II. Byrd also donated timber used to build the church, and wood to fire the kiln for the bricks for the foundation. Henrico's county seat was also moved from Varina to Richmond in 1752. The county offices were moved to a building still extant at present-day Twenty-second and Main Streets, where they operated until the 1970s.

The builder of the new church was Col. Richard Randolph (1686–1748), great-uncle to Thomas Jefferson. The original church building was completed on June 10, 1741. It remains as the transept of the current church, built along east-west lines. In 1772, a forty-foot-square extension was added to the northern side, orienting the church towards the south, to which end the altar was moved.

Over one hundred frame churches similar to this existed in Virginia before the American Revolution, of which only four are still standing. One of these is the Old Chapel Church in Franklin County, Virginia

=== Second Virginia Convention ===
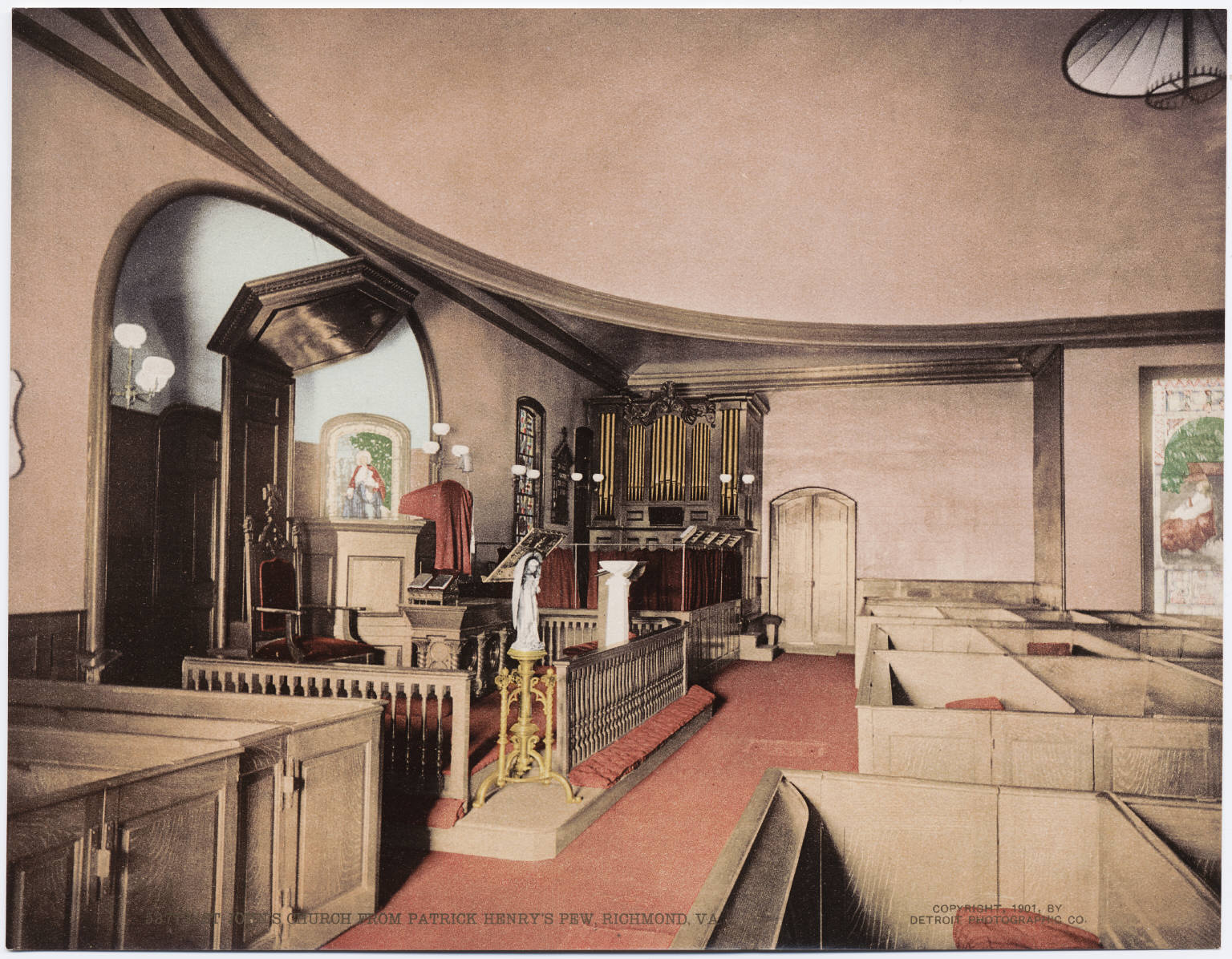
Interior of St. John's as seen from Patrick Henry's pew, ca. 1901

The Virginia colonial legislative assembly, the House of Burgesses, was dismissed by the royal governor due to tensions that led up to the American Revolutionary War. The Burgesses met as a provisional government in the First Virginia Convention in Williamsburg. Since the governor had loyalist forces in the vicinity of the capital of Williamsburg, it was decided to hold the next convention in Richmond. On March 23, 1775, the Second Virginia Convention was opened at the church. The President of the Convention was Peyton Randolph, who was also the Speaker of the House of Burgesses.

The Reverend Miles Selden was the rector of St. John's church at the time, and when the Convention assembled, he was chosen as Chaplain. Selden was popularly referred to as the "Patriot Parson." Among the 120 delegates were Thomas Jefferson and George Washington. Other notable delegates were Benjamin Harrison V, Thomas Mann Randolph, Richard Bland, Richard Henry Lee and Francis Lightfoot Lee. Debate centered on the perceived need to raise a militia to resist encroachments on civil rights by the British Government under King George III. Patrick Henry, a delegate from Hanover County, rose in support of such a militia and, with his fiery speech (concluding with the words "Give me liberty or give me death!"), swayed the vote.

Under a Resolution offered by Richard Henry Lee, the House of Burgesses on May 15, 1776, resolved that "the delegates appointed to represent this colony in General Congress be instructed to propose to that respectable body to declare the united Colonies free and independent states."

It is notable that the Second Virginia Convention authorized Baptist chaplains to minister to soldiers, an important early step toward freedom of religion in what became the Commonwealth of Virginia. Baptists and Methodists had been influential in Virginia during and following the Great Awakening, and many of the common people had already become affiliated with Baptist and Methodist congregations. After the war, the Anglican Church was disestablished, and the Episcopal Church of the United States was organized.

=== Third Virginia Convention ===
The Third Virginia Convention was held at St. John's Church on July 17, 1775 to organize the troops and the war effort of Virginia. George Washington of Fairfax had been appointed head of the American Army. The delegates acknowledged the debt to Patrick Henry, whose wisdom had already begun the arming of the colony, and he was named the first Governor of Virginia.

=== American Revolutionary War ===
During the American Revolutionary War, in January 1781, General Benedict Arnold, the traitor who was then serving on the British side, quartered his troops in the church when Richmond was occupied.

== Tourism ==
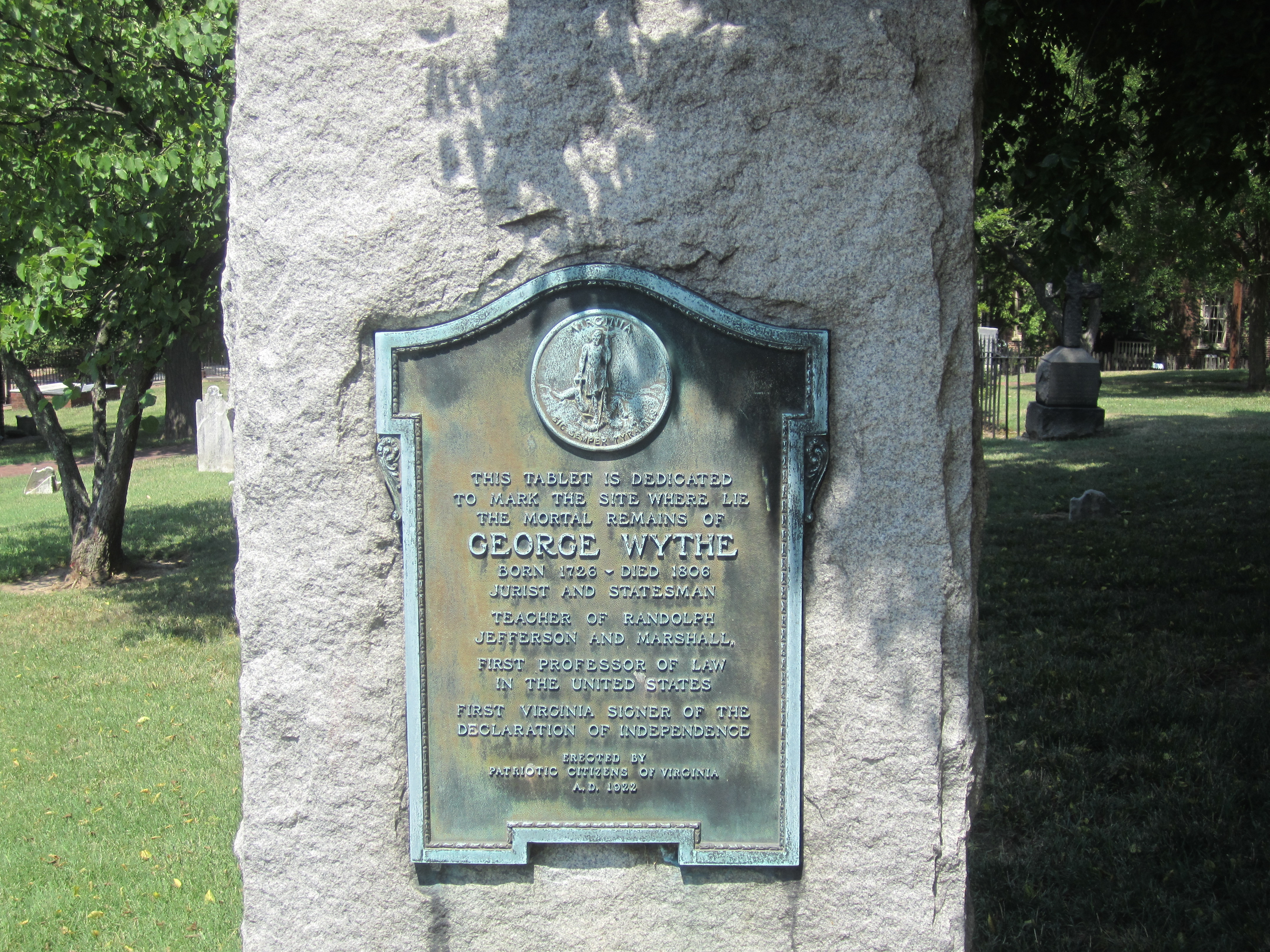
Grave of George Wythe

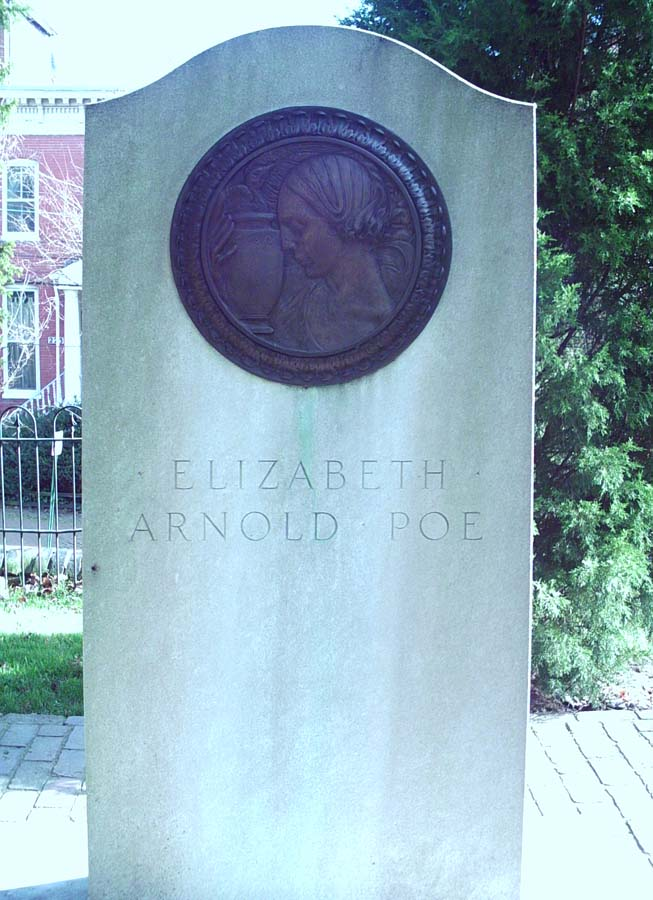
Memorial marker for Eliza Poe

The church serves an active congregation and ministries, and also receives tourists as a historic site.

George Wythe, the first law professor in the United States, a delegate to the Continental Congress and signatory of the Declaration of Independence, is buried in the churchyard. Elizabeth Arnold Poe, mother of author Edgar Allan Poe, is buried in the churchyard. Her exact burial spot is unknown, but a memorial marks the general area.

There is a gift shop located within the churchyard from which regular guided tours depart. These tours take place inside the church and explore the events in Virginia leading up to the Second Virginia Convention, Patrick Henry's famous speech, and his political career. Reenactments featuring professional actors in 1700s costumes are offered on Sundays at 1:30 p.m. from Memorial Day to Labor Day and regularly attract over 100 attendees. The Walter W. Craigie Speaker Series brings speakers to St. John's Church to talk about topics related to history and has included former Virginia governors Douglas Wilder and George Allen.

== See also ==
- List of National Historic Landmarks in Virginia
- National Register of Historic Places listings in Richmond, Virginia
