= John Marshall House =

Historic house in Virginia, United States

- U.S. National Register of Historic Places
- U.S. National Historic Landmark
- Virginia Landmarks Register
- Richmond City Historic District
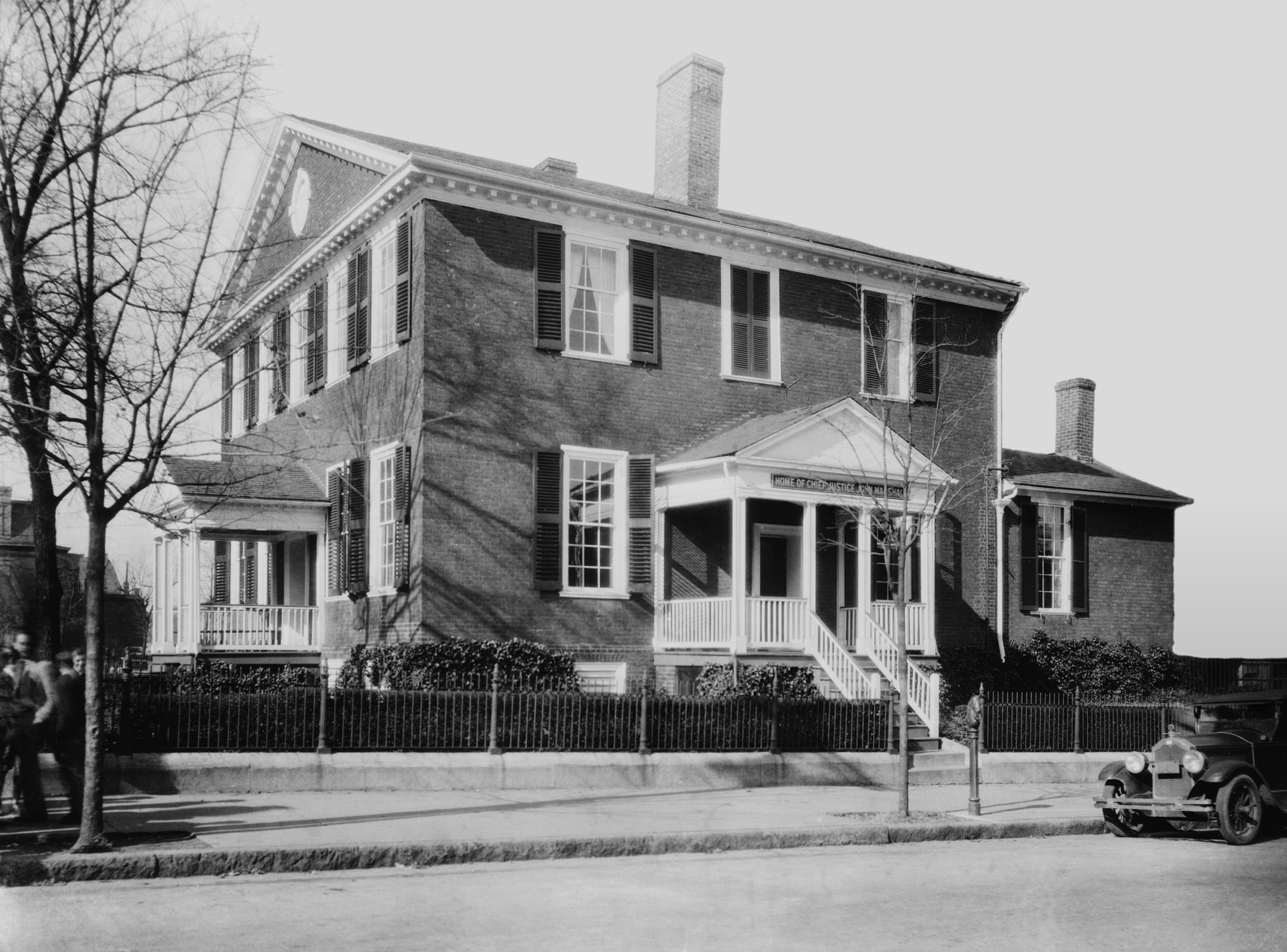
- John Marshall House

- Location within Virginia Location within the United States
- Location: 9th and Marshall Sts., Richmond, Virginia
- Coordinates: 37°32′34″N 77°25′59″W
- Built: 1790
- Architectural style: Federal
- NRHP reference No.: 66000916
- VLR No.: 127-0073

Significant dates
- Added to NRHP: October 15, 1966
- Designated NHL: December 19, 1960
- Designated VLR: September 9, 1969

The John Marshall House is a historic house museum and National Historic Landmark at 818 East Marshall Street in Richmond, Virginia. It was the home of Chief Justice of the United States and Founding Father John Marshall, who was appointed to the court in 1801 by President John Adams and served for the rest of his life, writing such influential decisions as Marbury v. Madison (1803) and McCulloch v. Maryland (1819).

Built in 1790, the house was home to Marshall, his wife Mary Willis Ambler Marshall (known within the family as Polly), and their six children. Marshall lived at the house until his death in 1835.

The house is a Federal-style brick building featuring a dining room, parlor, and large parlor/dining room on the first floor and three bedchambers on the second. It was originally surrounded by an outbuildings including a law office, kitchen, laundry, and stables and sat on a full city block in Richmond's fashionable Court End residential neighborhood. Marshall's neighbors included the attorney John Wickham, who defended Aaron Burr in Burr's infamous treason trial.

== History ==
John Marshall's account books show that he began to make payments for the purchase of the property from "Mr. B. Lewis" on October 7, 1786, and finished the payments on November 19, 1786. The Marshalls called a small wooden house their home while the building on the corner of Marshall and Ninth Streets was being built. The actual date the Marshalls moved into their house is sometimes stated as 1788 and other times stated as January 1791. When John Marshall built his house, Richmond's population was rapidly growing and many new homes were being built. The John Marshall House was one of the first homes to be built in the beginnings of a neighborhood which would later be known as the Court End of Richmond.

The first insurance policy regarding this home, which is dated 1796, states that "whole square, with the house as it is now except for the little wing, and a wooden office on Marshall Street, a wooden kitchen on Ninth, and the laundry" were in John Marshall's ownership at that time. The insurance policy notes that the location of the previously mentioned buildings was lot 786 and that a stable was located at the extreme northwest corner of the square. Without deduction for decay, all the buildings on the property in 1796 were valued at $5500. Luckily for historians, John Marshall kept good records of his finances in his account book. In his account book, he recorded the names of everyone who worked on his home. Mr. Sydnor, Keeling and Smith, W. Goode, W. Duke, and W. B. Lewis are listed as working on the house, with the last payment for work on the home in November 1790. According to Marshall's account books, the total cost of the house was 1211 pounds, 1 shilling, and three pence. Though Marshall's account book shows the last payment for work on the house being in November 1790, construction of fences and outbuildings was still in progress during July 1791. Sometime before the insurance policy was updated in 1810, the John Marshall House expanded with a new wing and three porches, which were not included in the 1796 insurance policy.

== Architecture ==
The exterior appearance of the house has been described as "unpretentious" and "simple in outline and detail." The style of hand-carved woodwork that was common in eighteenth-century houses is found inside the John Marshall House. Panels cover one end of both the parlor and the library, which also both feature small cupboards beside the chimney. The main floor rooms all have dadoes except for the small addition added to the first floor. Though the dining room is absent of any paneling such as that located in the library and parlor, it has a "particularly beautiful" cornice and ornamented mantles. In Houses of Old Richmond, Mary Wingfield Scott describes the rooms as "bright and well proportioned" and notes how "particularly charming" the stairway is. She does, however, criticize the arrangement of the rooms as haphazard and unflattering, noting how upon entrance from a tiny vestibule the visitor must choose between turning right to the library or left to the parlor.

== Preservation ==
The house, while owned by John Marshall's daughter Mary, was rented out to people such as Thomas B. Bigger, Robert Gwathmey, Professor Charles H. Winston, Henry A. Wise, and Mrs. Mattie Paul Myers. By the time his granddaughters, the Misses Anne and Emily Harvie, came into ownership of this house, the lot had been shrunk to only 64 feet (20 m) on Marshall Street and 154 feet (47 m) on Ninth Street. Misses Anne and Emily Harvie sold the lot in 1907 to the City of Richmond, who planned to destroy the house and build John Marshall High School on the site. Women's organizations were able to successfully unite to preserve the John Marshall House. In 1911, the house was placed into the perpetual care of Preservation Virginia (formerly known as the Association for the Preservation of Virginia Antiquities) who has operated it as a historic house museum ever since.

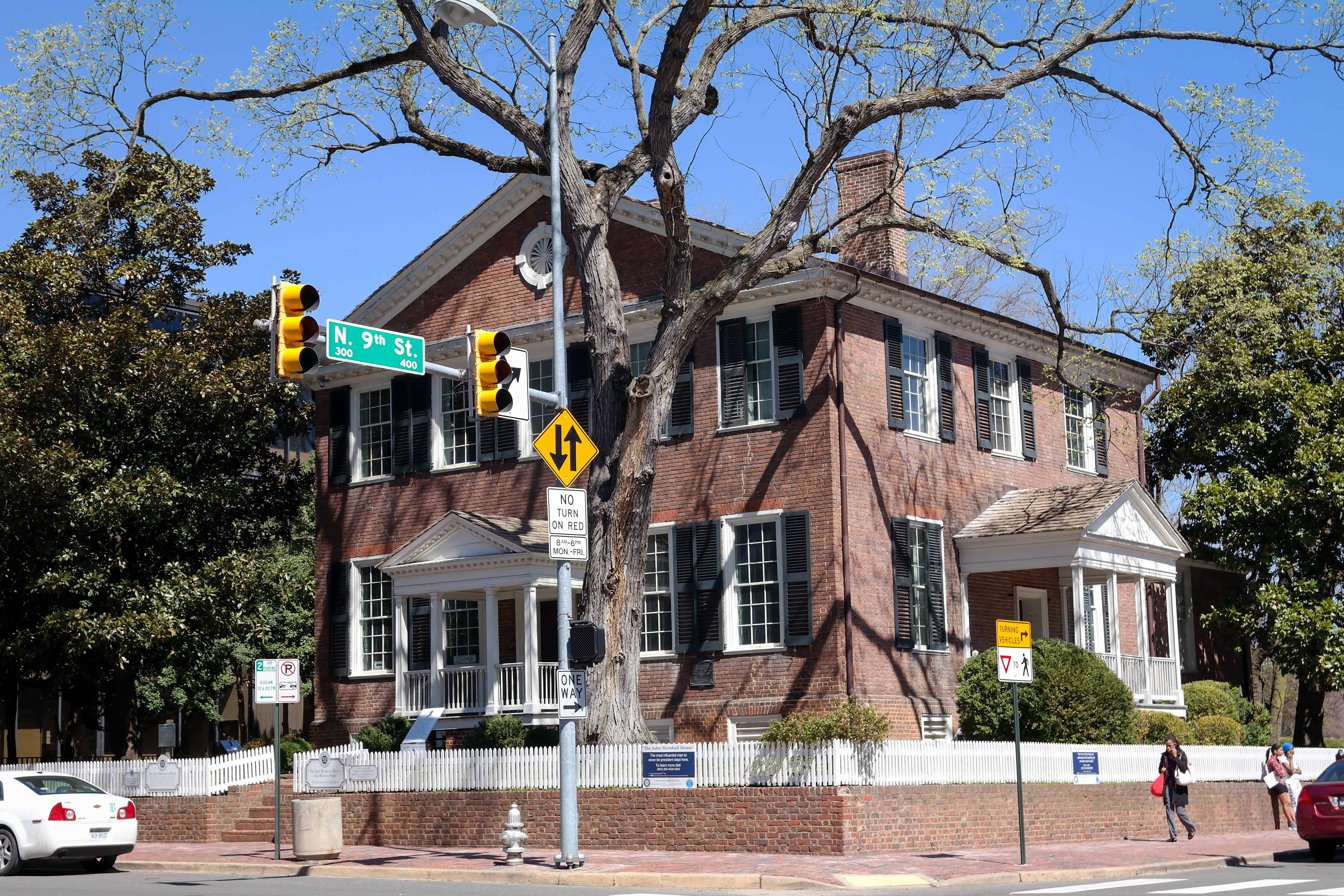

The house was declared a National Historic Landmark in 1960. In 2005, in honor of the 250th anniversary of John Marshall's birth and in recognition of more than 80 years of stewardship responsibility, the house was deeded to Preservation Virginia by the City of Richmond. Since then the house has undergone major restoration work including a new roof, repainting to the original color scheme, and other physical and mechanical upgrades.

The John Marshall House is open seasonally for drop-in tours and throughout the year by appointment and for special events.

== See also ==
- List of National Historic Landmarks in Virginia
- National Register of Historic Places listings in Richmond, Virginia
