= Duke University Libraries =

Academic library system of Duke University, North Carolina

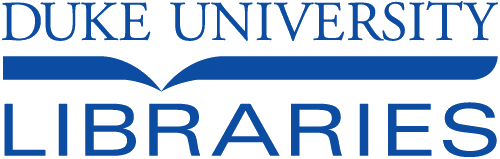

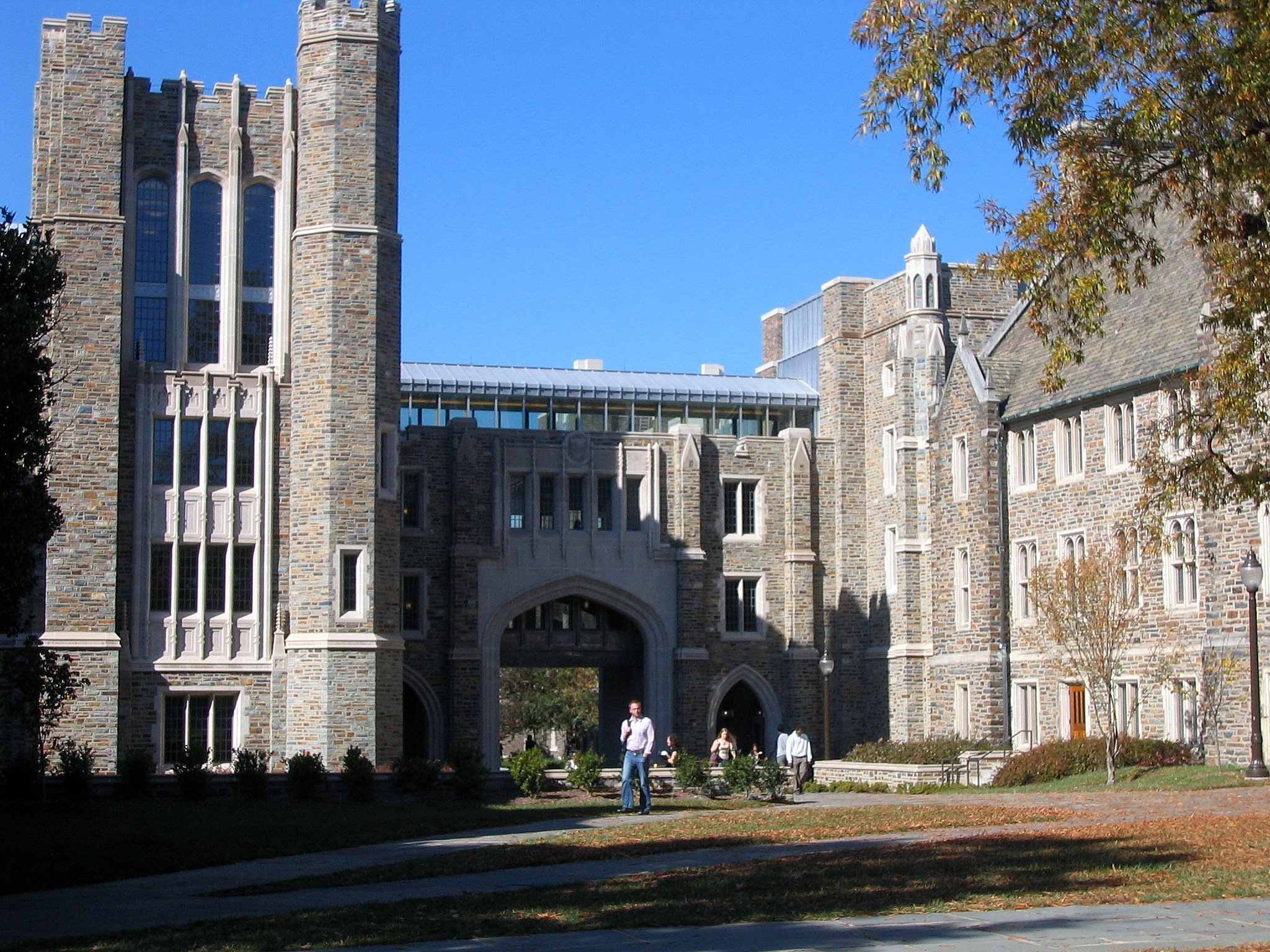
- The Bostock Library
- Established: 1861; 165 years ago
- Branches: 6

Collection
- Size: 8.9 million volumes

Other information
- Director: Joseph Salem
- Website: library.duke.edu

Duke University Libraries is the library system of Duke University, serving the university's students and faculty. The Libraries collectively hold some 8.9 million volumes.

The collection contains 17.7 million manuscripts, 1.2 million public documents, and tens of thousands of films and videos. The Duke University Libraries consists of the William R. Perkins Library, Bostock Library, and the Rubenstein Rare Book & Manuscript Library on West Campus; the Lilly Library and Music Library on East Campus, and the Pearse Memorial Library at the Duke Marine Lab. It also includes the Library Service Center, library offices located in the Smith Warehouse, as well as a few other departments. The professional schools have separately administrated libraries: the Goodson Law Library, Duke Divinity School Library, Ford Library at Fuqua School of Business, and the Medical Center Library & Archives. The Biological and Environmental Sciences Library was formerly part of the system but in 2009 it closed permanently.

== Libraries and departments ==
=== William R. Perkins Library ===
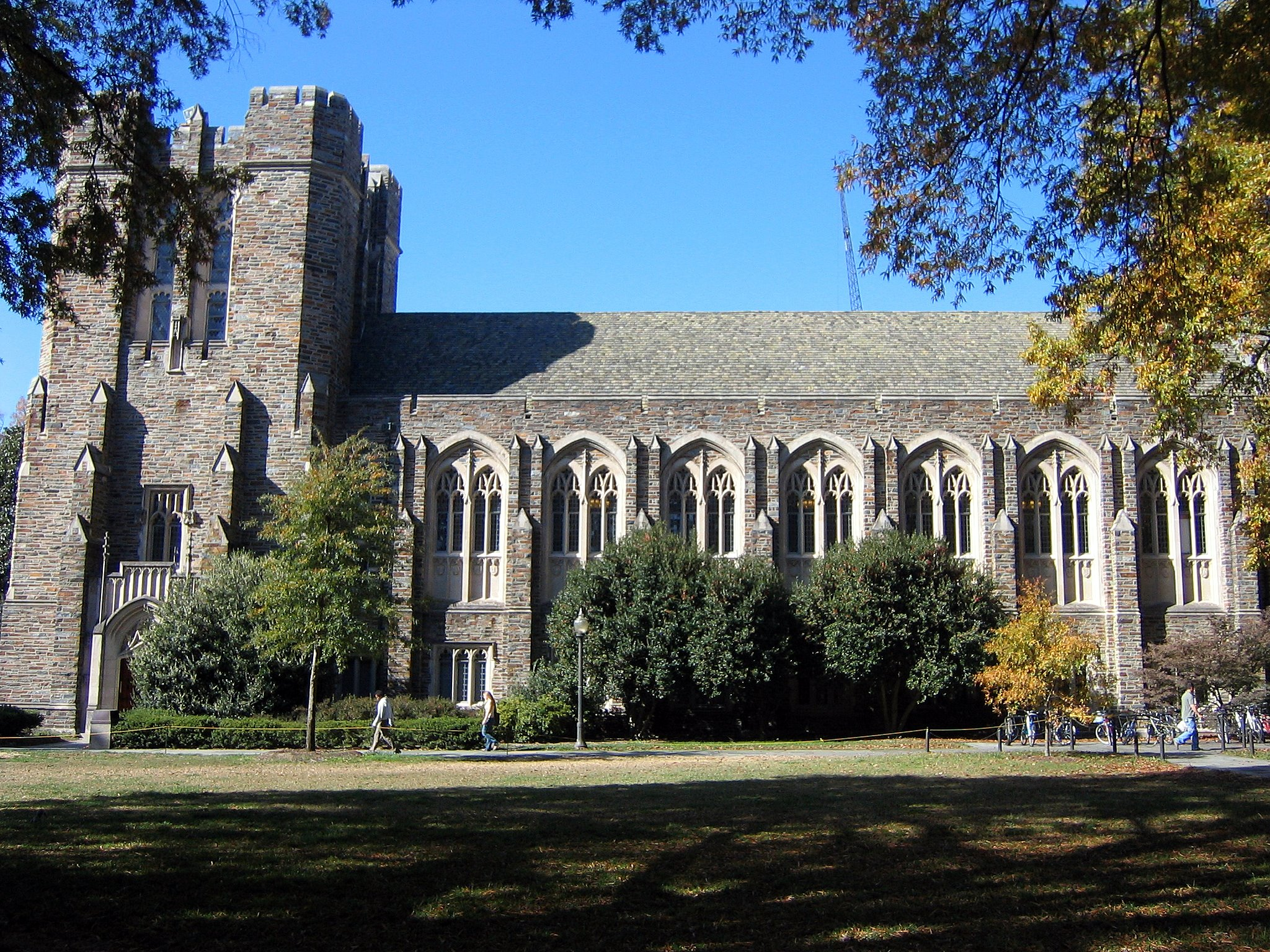
The Gothic Reading Room of Perkins Library

The Perkins Library system, opened in 1930 as the General Library and named in 1966 for Duke Endowment trustee William Robertson Perkins, has nine branches on campus.

=== Roy J. Bostock Library ===
Bostock Library, named for board of trustees member Roy J. Bostock, opened in the fall of 2005 as part of the University's strategic plan to supplement Duke's libraries. It contains 87 study carrels, 517 seats, and 96 computer stations, as well as 72,996 feet (22,249 m) of shelving for overflow books from Perkins Library as well as for new collections.

=== David M. Rubenstein Rare Book & Manuscript Library ===
The David M. Rubenstein Rare Book & Manuscript Library holds more than 350,000 rare books, 10,000 manuscript collections, and extensive collections of photography, film, and audio, as well as a major collection of Confederate imprints. The library was named after board of trustees member and alumnus David M. Rubenstein in 2011.

=== Divinity School Library ===
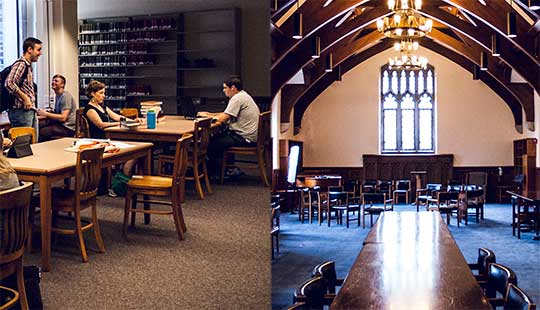
Divinity School Library

The Divinity School Library is located next to Perkins Library in the Duke Divinity School. It contains 400,000 volumes, as well as various periodicals and other materials to support the study of theology and religion. The library is the host institution for the Religion in North Carolina Digitization project, a collaborative digitization project with Wake Forest University and the University of North Carolina at Chapel Hill.

== See also ==
- Joseph Penn Breedlove, first University Librarian
- Benjamin E. Powell, University Librarian, ALA President
- David Ferriero, University Librarian, Archivist of the United States
