= Court End =

Historic neighborhood of Richmond, Virginia, United States

Coordinates: 37°32′38″N 77°25′53″W

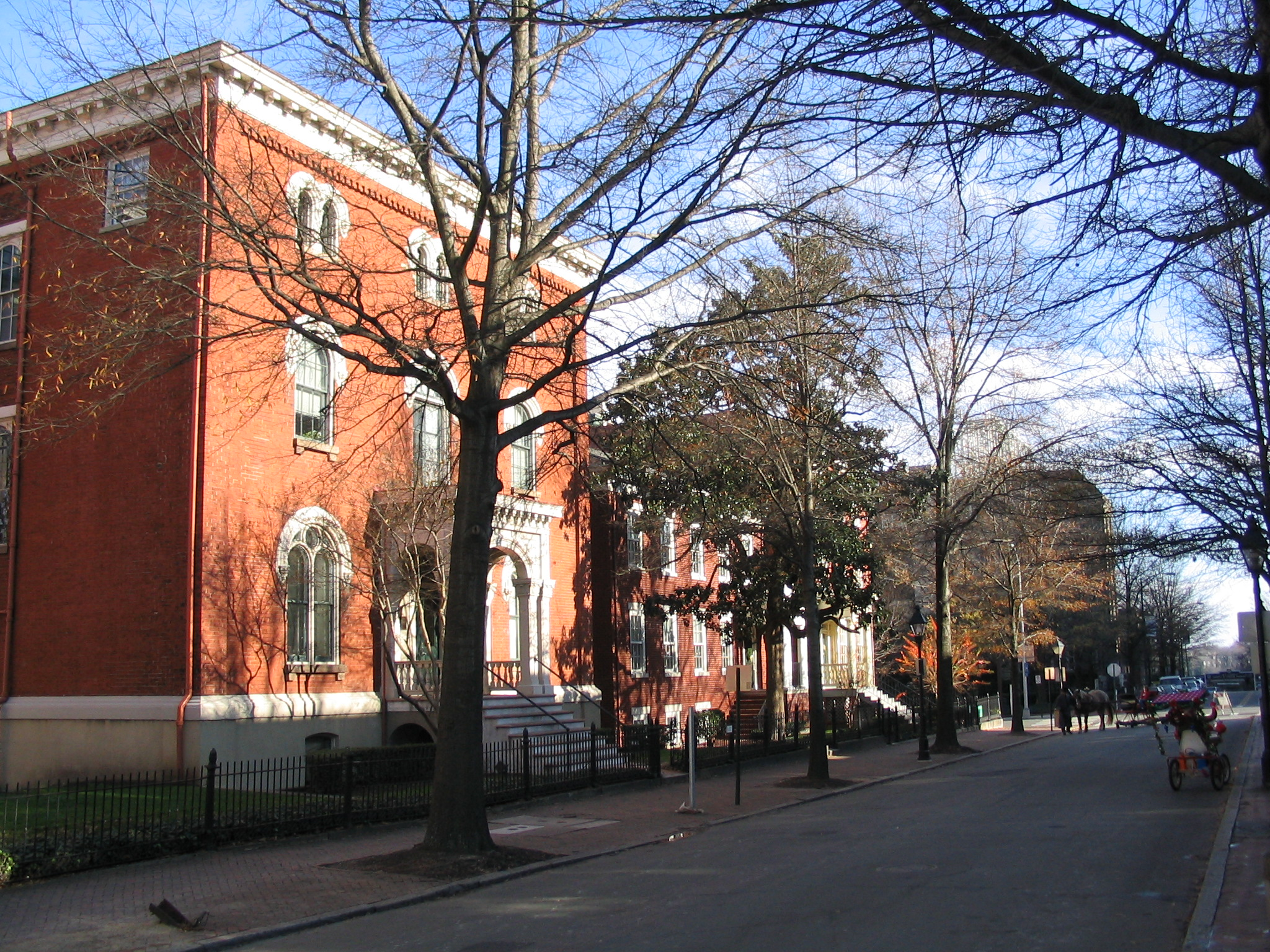
1000 block E. Clay Street

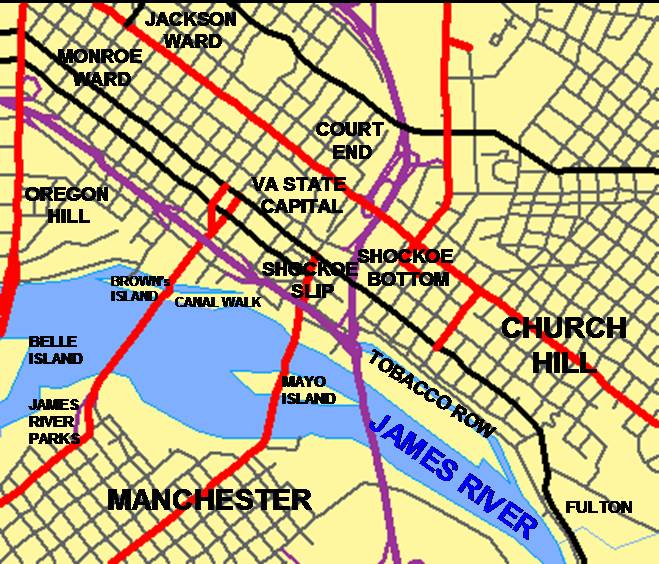
There are several areas in Downtown Richmond, including Shockoe Bottom, Shockoe Slip, the River District, Belle Isle, Monroe Ward, Manchester, Jackson Ward, Main Street, Court End, Tobacco Row, and the Canal Walk. edit

Court End is a neighborhood in Richmond, Virginia, that sits to the north of the Capitol Square and East Broad Street. It developed in the Federal era, after Virginia's capital moved from Williamsburg.

== Boundaries ==
Located on the northern end of Shockoe Hill, its boundaries are Grace and Capital Streets to the south, Jackson Street to the north, College and 14th Streets to the east and Seventh Street to the west.

== History ==
Early American Federal architecture that is open to the public in Court End include the John Marshall House, Monumental Church, the Wickham House at the Valentine Richmond History Center, the White House of the Confederacy at the Museum of the Confederacy, Executive Mansion and Virginia State Capitol. Other adjacent historic structures include the Capitol Square Bell Tower, Hotel Richmond, Murphy's Hotel, Old City Hall. The neighborhood includes the Egyptian Building, First African Baptist Church, the Medical College of Virginia's West Hospital and Morson's Row. Notable architects associated with Court End include Robert Mills (architect), who designed Monumental Church, Thomas U. Walter, who designed First Baptist Church, now Hunton Hall, Alexander Parris and Walter Dorwin Teague, who designed the Centennial Dome.

According to the mid-twentieth-century historian, author and preservationist, Mary Wingfield Scott, the Court End District dates to the 1780s, and grew naturally as a prestigious neighborhood due to its close proximity to Thomas Jefferson’s new Capitol. Before its heyday as the neighborhood of Richmond’s elite, there once stood a vibrant theater district and a large scale market. The great theater fire of 1811 destroyed most of the “Theater Block,” and the market failed to compete with the better established Old State Market or “First Market” in nearby Shockoe Bottom. The neighborhood grew in waves, primarily in the 1780s, 1810s, and 1840s. The Court End was the home of large number of Richmond’s important houses of worship, including First Presbyterian, First Baptist, St. Paul’s Episcopal, First African Baptist, Monumental, and Sycamore Churches, St. Peter’s Cathedral, and Beth Shalome and Beth Ahabah Synagogues. The Richmond Female Institute, or Baptist Women’s Institute, was located in the heart of the Court End. It later formed Westmoreland College, which in turn, became the women’s school within the University of Richmond. Its nineteenth-century building towered over and dominated the Court End cityscape. The Hampden-Sydney Medical College built its Egyptian Revival style lecture hall, The Egyptian Building, in 1845, thus planting the seeds of what became VCU Medical School.

== Civil War ==
While Richmond served as the capital of the Confederacy, Court End remained a neighborhood of wealth but also served as the host community for many of the Confederacy’s major players, most especially President Jefferson Davis and the Confederacy’s first family (the Brockenbrough-Crenshaw House, which from the 1890s, is referred to as the White House of the Confederacy, at the southeast corner of 12th and Clay Streets), and briefly, Vice President Alexander Stephens (the Bruce-Lancaster House, on the northwest corner of 12th and Clay).

During Reconstruction, Davis’ former mansion was used as the military headquarters for militarily governed Virginia. Afterwards and for twenty years, the City of Richmond used it as its first public school, Richmond Central School.

== Medical Campus and Budding Museum District ==
By the 1890s, two distinct efforts were under way within the Court End district. First, the several small medical colleges that began there, consolidated to create the Medical College of Virginia. MCV was merged with the VCU Medical School in 1968.

Secondly, efforts began to preserve a number of the neighborhoods more famous addresses, mainly by creating independent house museums. Three organizations formed the anchors for this effort, and are still in operation, today. The Confederate Memorial Literary Society formed in 1890 to save the White House of the Confederacy from demolition. In 1896, the CMLS opened what is now the Museum of the Confederacy. In 1892, the Valentine family began its non-profit corporation to create a museum for local history. Its museum, now the Valentine Richmond History Center, opened its doors in 1898. The Association for the Preservation of Virginia Antiquities (now Preservation Virginia) gained its foothold in Richmond by saving the John Marshall House, in 1911. Later efforts by a fourth preservation player, the Historic Richmond Foundation, helped preserve Monumental Church, 1965.

In 1950, Mary Wingfield Scott warned, “one can only fear that except for the buildings protected as are the Confederate Museum, the Valentine Museum, and the John Marshall House, all traces of Richmond’s past will soon disappear from this, the most historic of its many old neighborhoods.” Her prediction has proven true, for the most part. Despite the medical college’s expansion, however, VCU has saved a number of historic houses and other buildings within the Court End, including the William Beers House, Egyptian Building, First Baptist Church, the Putney Houses, William H. Grant House, and the Leigh House.

== Court End District, today ==
Except for museums, most of the area is publicly owned, as Virginia Commonwealth University's Medical College of Virginia campus is a primary landowner in the area, as well as the Commonwealth of Virginia and City of Richmond. The neighborhood's 20th century inventory is strong, with the Depression era Virginia Department of Transportation Headquarters, the Patrick Henry Building, and MCV West Hospital.

Free attractions include the Richmond City Hall Observation Deck and the Library of Virginia. Other building lobbies are open to the public, including Old City Hall. The area's historic status as entertainment district was restored with Historic Richmond Foundation's sale of the National Theater for restoration into a music hall.

The White House of the Confederacy, Wickham House, and John Marshall House have each been restored to their original appearances, and remain open to the public. There is an effort to package the neighborhood's various paid attractions. The Court End Passport, sold by the Valentine Richmond History Center, provides access to buildings in the neighborhood, including John Marshall House, and Wickham House. Each year, the neighborhood sponsors Court End Christmas, where many of the buildings, including those owned by VCU, are open to the public. The Museum (and White House) of the Confederacy also has packaged ticketing agreements, primarily with other Civil War sites.
