= John Brockenbrough (disambiguation) =

John Brockenbrough (1775–1852) was an American business man and civic leader.

John Brockenbrough may also refer to:

- John M. Brockenbrough (1830–1892), American Civil War Confederate officer
- John White Brockenbrough (1806–1877), American federal judge and founder of Washington and Lee University School of Law
