= Fireproof Building =

- U.S. National Register of Historic Places
- U.S. National Historic Landmark
- U.S. National Historic Landmark District – Contributing property
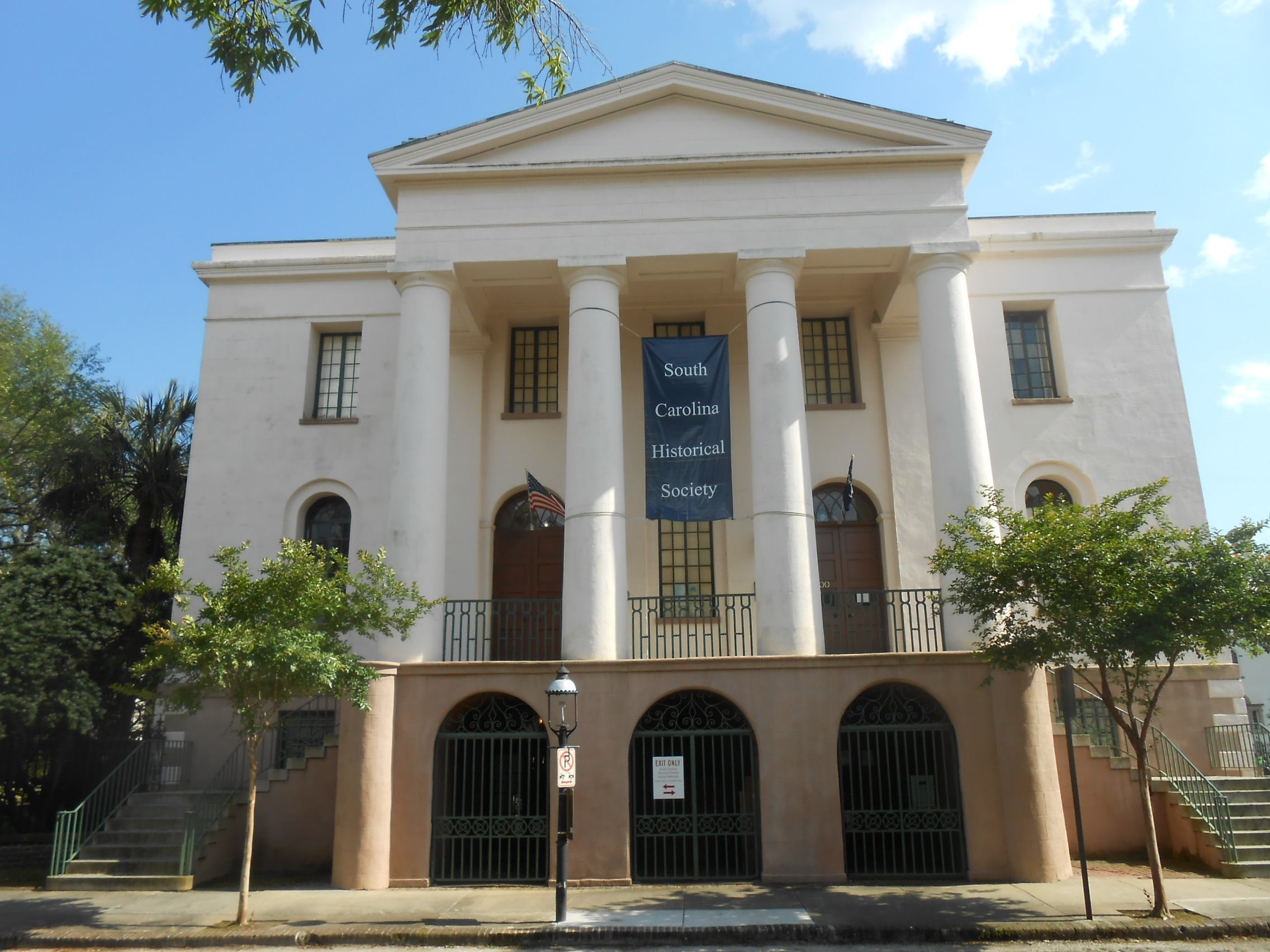
- Fireproof Building

- Location within South Carolina Location within the United States
- Location: 100 Meeting St., Charleston, South Carolina
- Coordinates: 32.7772°N 79.9309°W
- Built: 1822–1827
- Architect: Robert Mills
- Architectural style: Greek Revival
- Part of: Charleston Historic District (ID66000964)
- NRHP reference No.: 69000161

Significant dates
- Added to NRHP: July 29, 1969
- Designated NHL: November 7, 1973
- Designated NHLDCP: October 9, 1960

The Fireproof Building, also known as the County Records Building, is located at 100 Meeting Street, at the northwest corner of Washington Square, in Charleston, South Carolina. Completed in 1827, it was the most fire-resistant building in America at the time, and is believed to be the oldest fire-resistant building in America today.

After an extensive renovation, the building reopened in 2018 as the South Carolina Historical Society Museum.

== Description and history ==
The Fireproof Building is a two-story masonry structure, set on a tall stone basement with an arcade of round-arch openings and built out brick that has been stuccoed to resemble stone. The building is in the Greek Revival style, with Doric porticoes north and south, and achieves a sophisticated appearance with clean and crisp lines, and relatively little ornamentation. Inside, the building has an oval stair hall lit by a cupola. The stone stairs are cantilevered through three stories.

The building was built to house the office and records of Charleston County. The contractor, John G. Spidle, built it in 1827 to the design of Robert Mills, the nation's first domestically-trained architect and an early advocate of fire-resistant buildings. The Fireproof Building was listed on the National Register of Historic Places in 1969, and declared a National Historic Landmark in 1973.

The building is currently the home of the South Carolina Historical Society. In 2016-17 the society completed a major renovation intended to modernize all systems, to provide a secure, climate controlled environment for the storage of historic documents, and to provide both an events venue and modern museum space. In the summer of 2018 the society reopened the building as a museum dedicated to the history of South Carolina and to the history of the Fireproof Building itself.

== See also ==
- List of National Historic Landmarks in South Carolina
- National Register of Historic Places listings in Charleston, South Carolina
- Fireproofing
- Passive fire protection
