= Centennial Dome =

Coordinates: 37°32′41.1″N 77°25′47.7″W

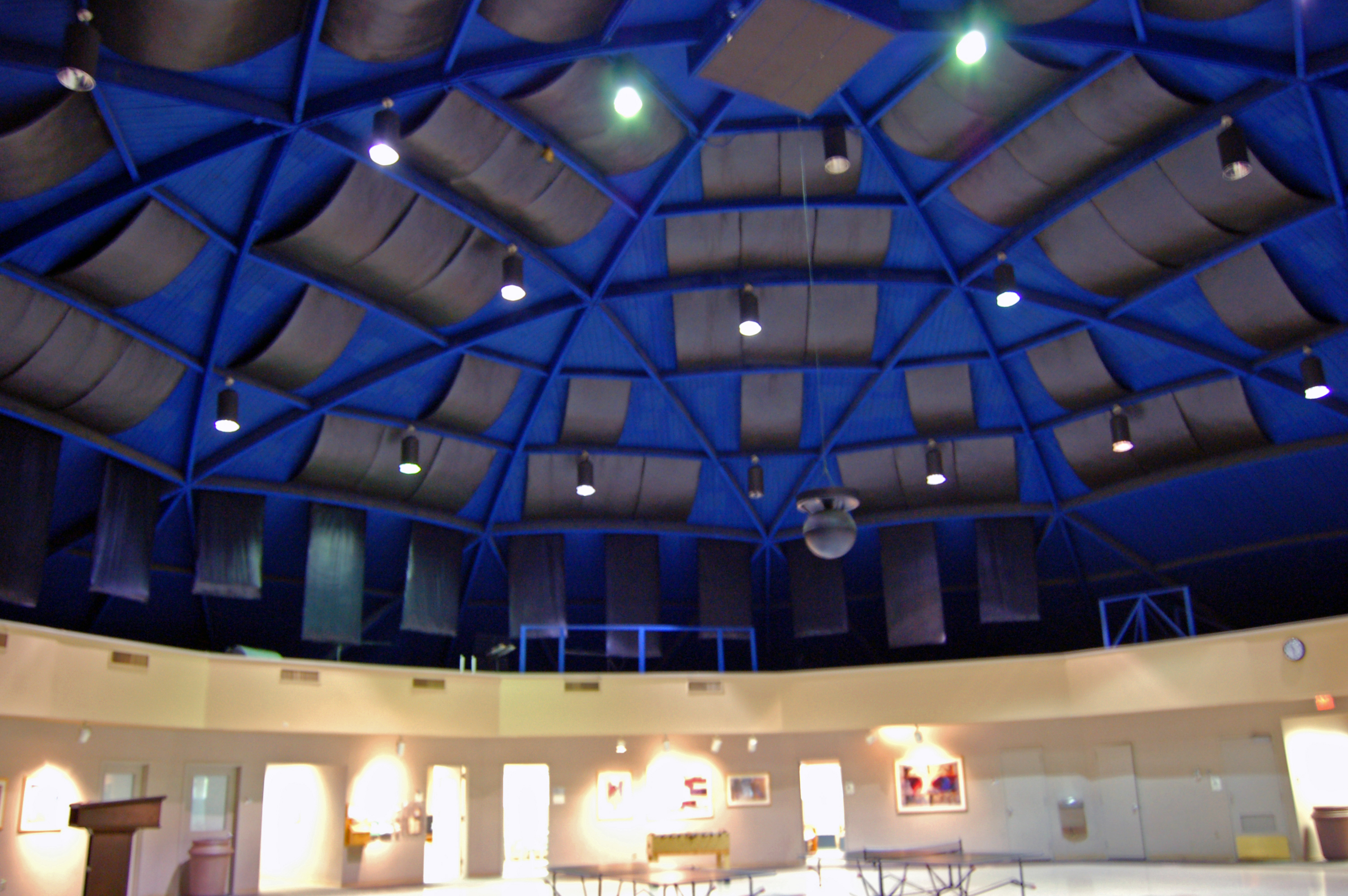
Centennial Dome in Richmond, Virginia, shortly before it was demolished.

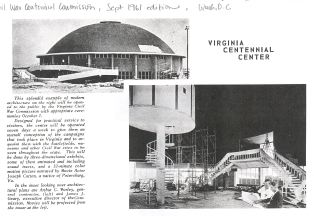
An image of the Centennial Dome under construction, taken from national Civil War Centennial Commission newsletter

The Centennial Dome, also known as the Virginia Centennial Center, was designed by Walter Dorwin Teague to serve as a focus for Virginia's efforts to publicize Virginia's Civil War history. It is one of the most modern structures ever built in Richmond. Built for the 1961 Civil War Centennial, it served as the Jonah L. Larrick Student Center on the Medical College of Virginia campus of Virginia Commonwealth University until 2007.

The Centennial Center was part of a major national effort to commemorate the Civil War. Thematic issues surrounding the construction of the center including using the Civil War as a vehicle for rural land preservation, promoting tourism and healing the wounds of the Civil War across the U.S. It served as a visitor center for attractions in Richmond including the Richmond National Battlefield Park of the National Park Service and the Museum of the Confederacy.

The hiring of Teague Associates for the centennial was a bold move for Richmond, which aimed to present itself as modern at the same time as it commemorated the Civil War. The construction began only a few years after the construction of the landmark modernist Reynolds Aluminum headquarters, listed on the National Register and recently renovated by Philip Morris. The Centennial effort was a time when Richmond attempted to be in the big league of design—the official hotel of the Civil War Centennial, the Hotel Richmond, hired the vanguard identity and branding firm Lippincott & Margulies to design their restaurant.

The decision to hire Teague was encouraged by Virginia Museum of Fine Arts director Leslie Cheek, a proponent of modern design. Cheek, in his biography by Parke Rouse, felt that the structure was "useful, functional and quite handsome." However, the design caused controversy; one councilman called it a "grapefruit turned upside down over a doughnut." It was located directly north in axis with Richmond's New City Hall.

The building was closed in December 2007 and was torn down on 2 May 2008. It was replaced by a new university dining and recreation facility.

Although the Centennial Dome is now gone, most of the exhibitions it housed have been located since 1970 in the Hall of Valor Museum at the New Market Battlefield State Historical Park in New Market, Virginia. The Park is the only facility owned by the Commonwealth of Virginia that interprets the military story of the war in the state.
