= American Civil War Museum =

History museum in Richmond, Virginia

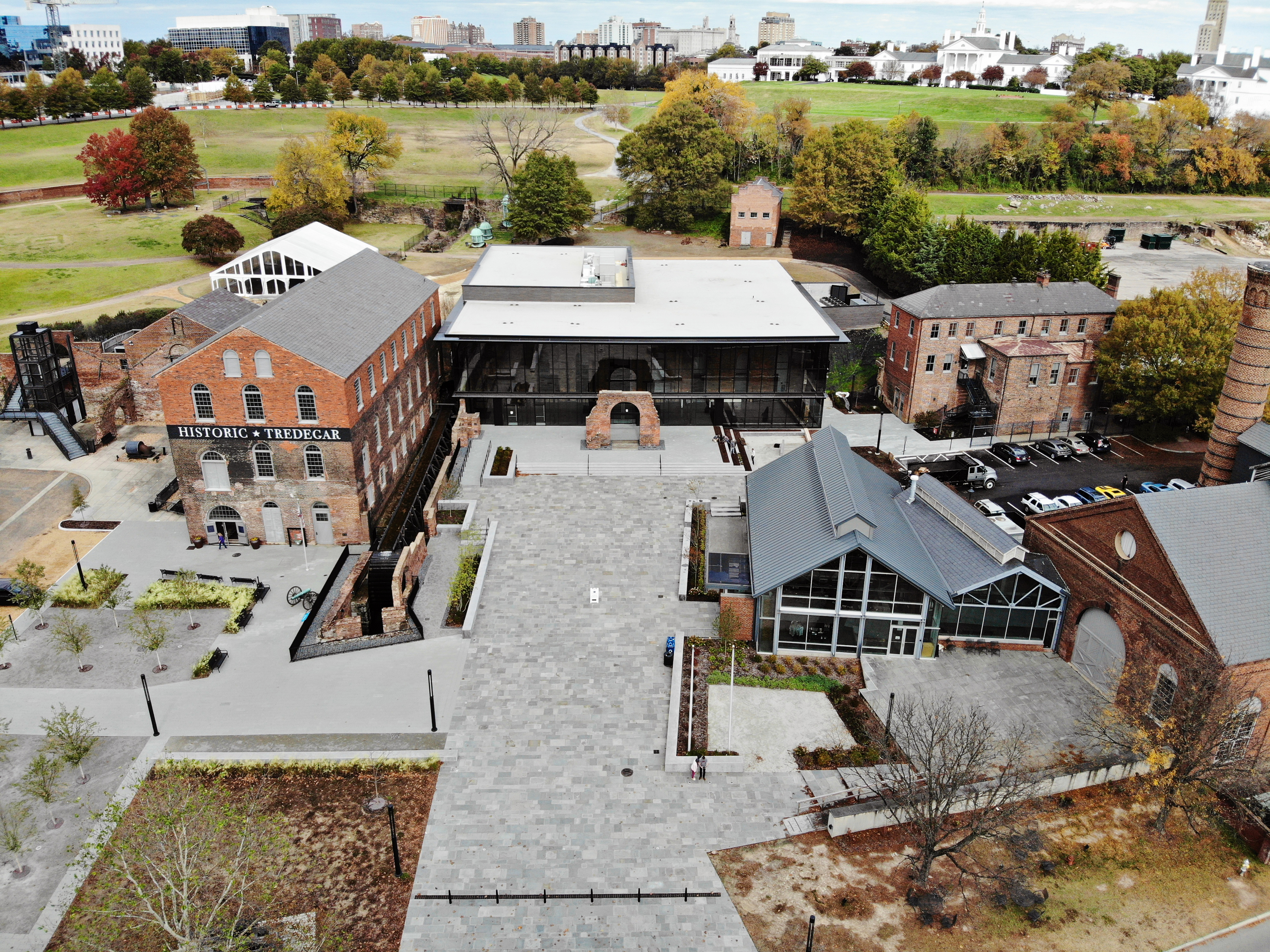
- The American Civil War Museum in Richmond, Virginia

- Location of the American Civil War Museum in Virginia
- Former name: Museum of the Confederacy; American Civil War Center
- Established: May 3, 1866
- Location: Richmond, Virginia; Appomattox, Virginia
- Coordinates: 37°32′26″N 77°25′46″W
- Type: History museum
- Key holdings: Uniform and sword of Robert E. Lee, the White House of the Confederacy
- Collections: Civil War-era documents and artifacts, militaria, battle flags
- Visitors: 51,000
- CEO: Rob Havers
- Historian: John S. Coski
- Website: acwm.org

The American Civil War Museum is a multi-site museum in the Greater Richmond Region of central Virginia, dedicated to the history of the American Civil War. The museum operates three sites: The White House of the Confederacy, the American Civil War Museum at Historic Tredegar in Richmond, and the American Civil War Museum at Appomattox. It maintains a comprehensive collection of artifacts, manuscripts, Confederate books and pamphlets, and photographs.

In November 2013, the Museum of the Confederacy and the American Civil War Center at Tredegar merged, creating the American Civil War Museum. Its current name was announced in January 2014.

== The Museum of the Confederacy ==
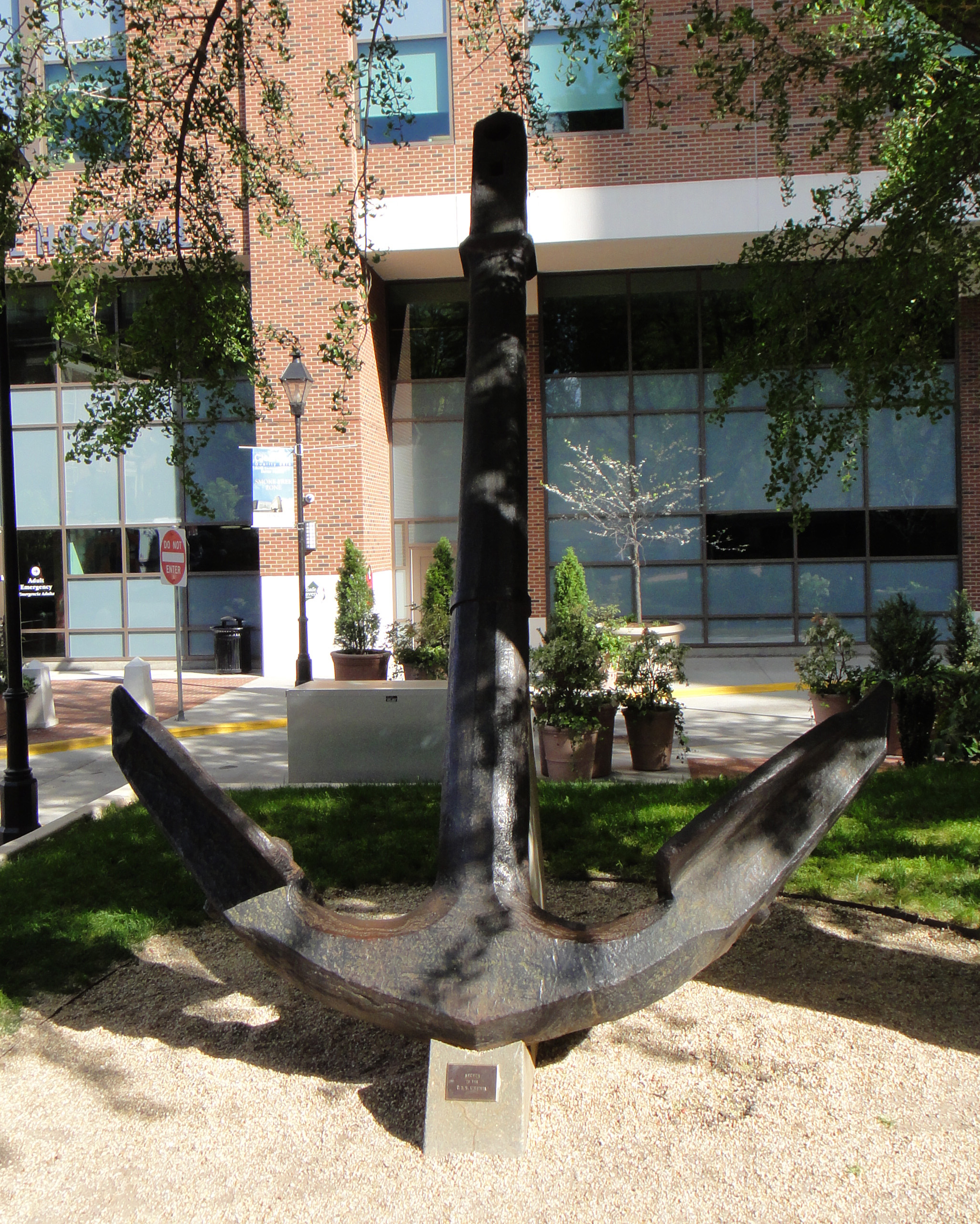
Anchor of the CSS Virginia

The Museum of the Confederacy was founded in 1894. It is located in the house that served as the White House of the Confederacy, two blocks north of the Virginia State Capitol, which the Ladies Hollywood Memorial Association saved from destruction. It opened as the Confederate Museum and White House of the Confederacy on February 22, 1896, the anniversary of Jefferson Davis's inauguration. The house was named a National Historic Landmark in 1963 and Virginia Historic Landmark in 1966. A new building next door was built in 1976 for the expanding collection (and a 12-year restoration of the building began). In 2006, museum officials announced that neither the museum nor the building would be moved. In 2017, the location became a part of the American Civil War Museum. It maintains a collection of flags, weapons, documents, and personal effects related to the Confederacy, and offers tours of the home restored to its 1861–65 appearance.

The museum houses more than 15,000 documents and artifacts along with 500 original, wartime, battle flags from the Confederate States of America. Among the thousands of other important pieces found there are items owned by Jefferson Davis, Robert E. Lee, Joseph E. Johnston, John Bell Hood, Stonewall Jackson, Simon Bolivar Buckner, J.E.B. Stuart, Joseph Wheeler, Wade Hampton, Lewis Armistead, and Raphael Semmes. The provisional Confederate Constitution and the Great Seal of the Confederacy are also housed there.

A newer building to better preserve and exhibit the museum's collections was built and opened in 1976 adjacent to the White House, on its remaining 0.75-acre (3,000 m^{2}) property. The anchor of the first ironclad warship, CSS Virginia, which fought the USS Monitor in the Battle of Hampton Roads on March 9, 1862, was displayed in front of the museum.

The White House of the Confederacy was closed in 1976, to be restored to its wartime appearance. The restoration project was completed in 1988, and it reopened for public tours in June 1988. The White House featured extensive reproduction wall coverings and draperies, as well as significant numbers of original White House furnishings from the Civil War period.

Notable past exhibitions include: The Confederate Years: Battles, Leaders, and Soldiers, 1861–1865; Women in Mourning; Before Freedom Came: African-American Life in the Antebellum South; Embattled Emblem: The Army of Northern Virginia Battle Flag, 1861 – Present; A Woman's War: Southern Women, Civil War, and the Confederate Legacy; R. E. Lee: The Exhibition; The Confederate Navy; and Virginia and the Confederacy: A Quadricentennial Perspective.

=== History ===
The Museum of the Confederacy was founded by Richmond's society ladies, starting with Isabel Maury, who was later joined by Ann Crenshaw Grant and Isobel Stewart Bryan. Isabel Maury was the founder of the Museum of the Confederacy but she also was the first Regent of the Confederate Memorial Literary Society (CMLS). The Isabel Maury Planned Giving Society continues the work of Mrs. Isabel Maury, daughter of Robert Henry Maury, who, with the Relics Committee, was instrumental in securing much of the museum's collection.

By the centennial anniversary of the Civil War, the museum's governing board determined that it wanted to see the museum evolve from a shrine to a more modern museum. In 1963, the CMLS hired its first museum professional as executive director, and in 1970, changed the name of the institution to "The Museum of the Confederacy." Visitors peaked at 91,000 per year in the early 1990s but were down to around 51,000 in the early 2000s.

=== White House of the Confederacy ===
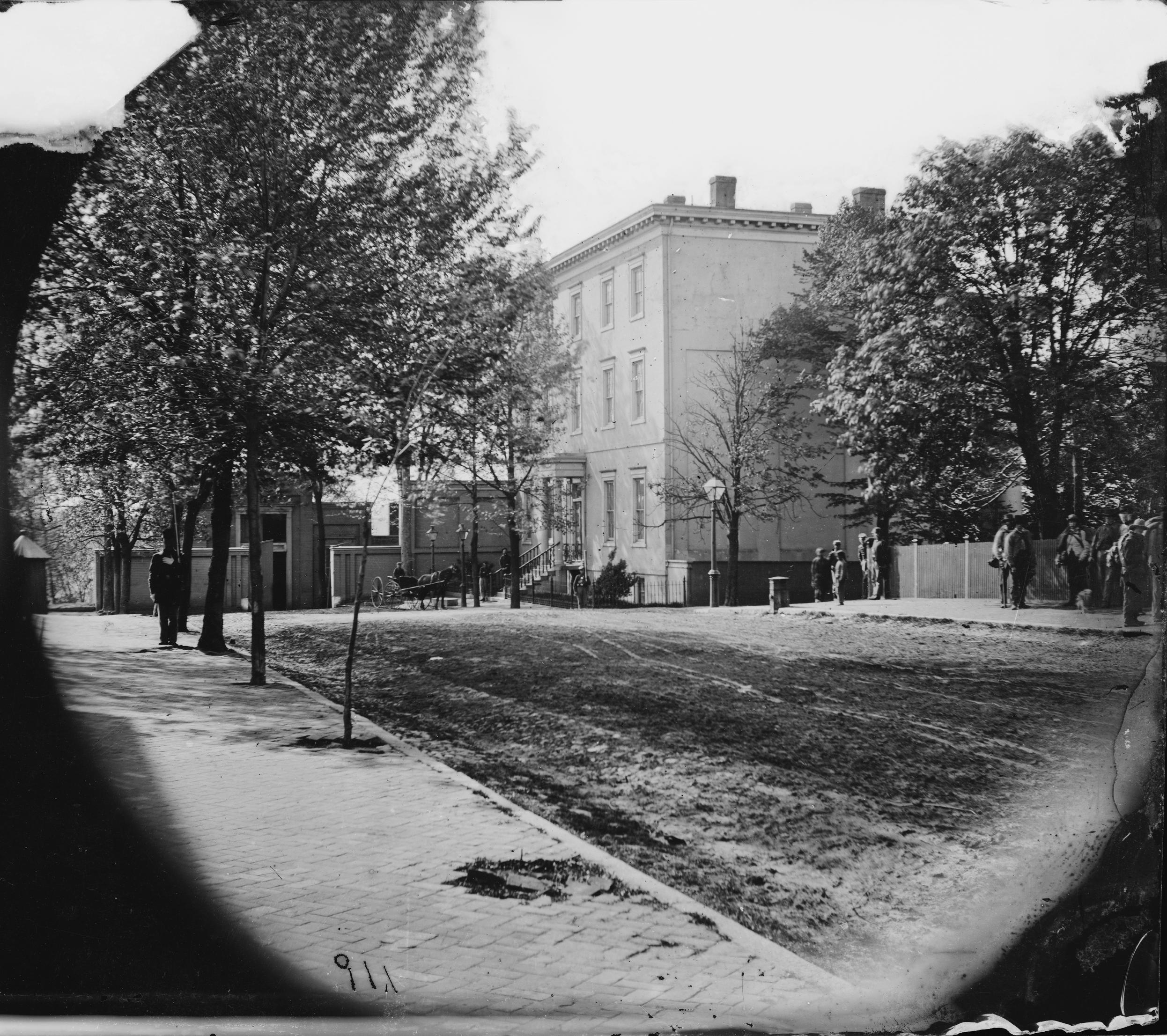
The White House of the Confederacy in 1865

The White House of the Confederacy is a gray stuccoed neoclassical mansion built in 1818 by John Brockenbrough, who was president of the Bank of Virginia. Designed by Robert Mills, Brockenbrough's private residence was built in early nineteenth century on East Clay Street in Richmond's affluent Shockoe Hill neighborhood (later known as the Court End District), and was two blocks north of the Virginia State Capitol.

President of the Confederate States of America Jefferson Davis, his wife Varina, and their children moved into the house in August 1861, and lived there for the remainder of the war. President Davis maintained an at-home office on the second floor of the White House due to his poor health.

The house was abandoned during the evacuation of Richmond on April 2, 1865. Within twelve hours, soldiers from Major General Godfrey Weitzel's XVIII Corps seized the former Confederate White House, intact. During his tour of Richmond, President Abraham Lincoln visited Davis's former residence, and it was where Union officers held a number of meetings with local officials in the aftermath. During Reconstruction, the building served as part of the headquarters for Military District Number One (Virginia), and was occasionally used as the residence of the commanding officer of the Department of Virginia.

Following the end of Reconstruction, the House became a school—the Richmond Central School. When the city announced its plans to demolish the building to make way for a more modern school building in 1890, the Confederate Memorial Literary Society was formed with the purpose of saving the White House from destruction.

== The American Civil War Museum – Appomattox ==
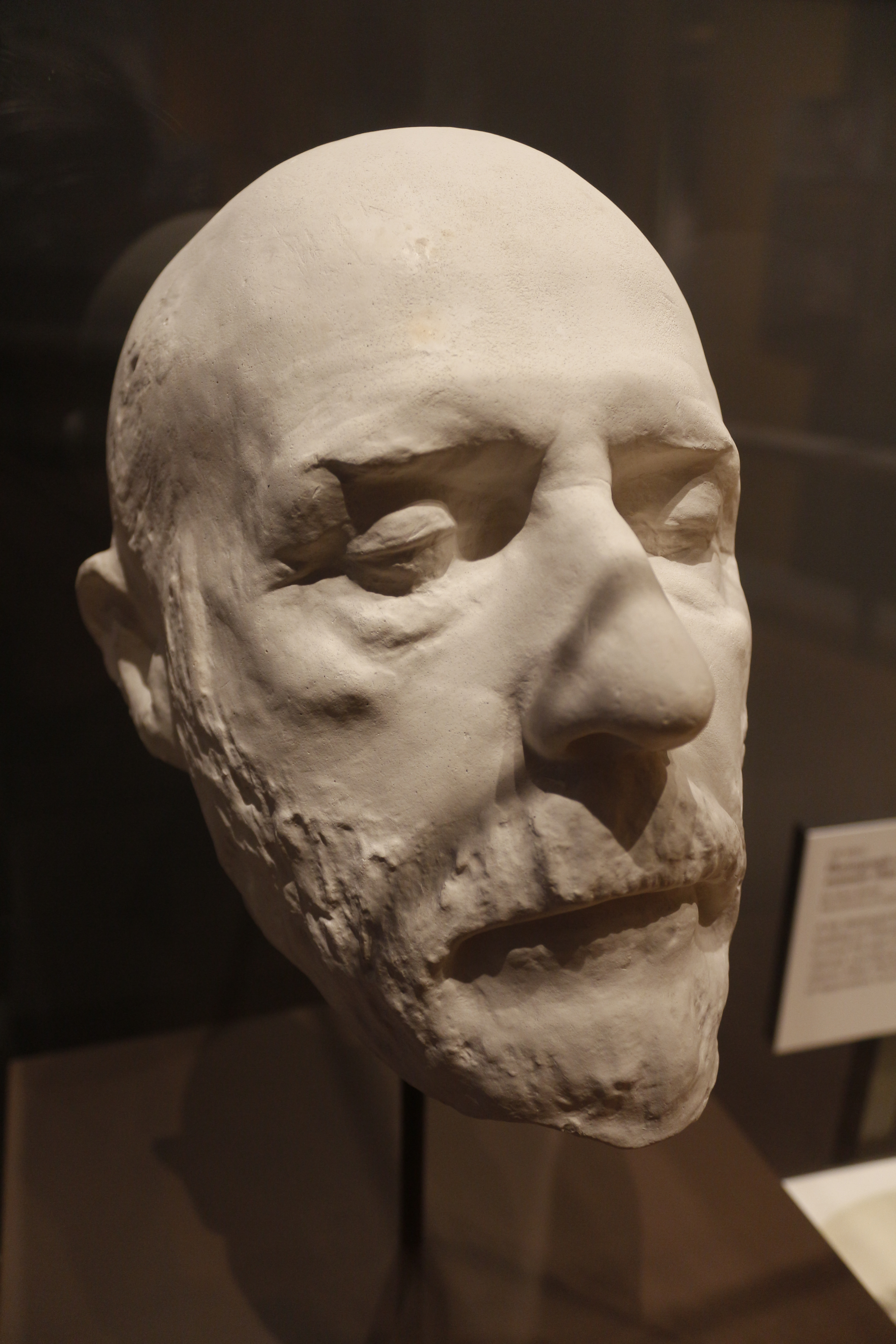
The death mask of Robert E. Lee on display at the Appomattox Museum

Opened in 2012 as the Museum of the Confederacy – Appomattox, in Appomattox, Virginia, adjacent to the Appomattox Court House National Historical Park, the American Civil War Museum – Appomattox tells the stories of the closing days of the Civil War, and the beginnings of the United States' journey toward reunion. The museum is situated on eight acres of land and contains 5,000 square feet for exhibits. The location changed its name in 2017 as part of the transition into the American Civil War Museum.

== Historic Tredegar ==
Historic Tredegar, home to The American Civil War Museum, traces its roots to 1836, when Francis B. Deane founded Tredegar Iron Works. He named his Richmond plant for a Welsh town and iron works. In 1841 Deane hired Joseph Reid Anderson as commercial sales agent. Under Joseph Reid Anderson's ownership, Tredegar manufactured an array of items including locomotives, train wheels, spikes, cables, ships, boilers, naval hardware, iron machinery, and brass items. In 2019, the museum completed a major new building on the site of the Tredegar Iron Works in downtown Richmond. The new building features more than 7,000 square feet of new gallery space for permanent and changing exhibitions of items from the museum's renowned collections of Civil War artifacts. An “immersion theater” highlighting Richmond's role in the war is still under construction.

== Connections to scholars ==
Several prominent Civil War historians have had connections to the museum. Douglas Southall Freeman, the biographer of George Washington and Robert E. Lee, started his career at the museum. Jack Davis, Emory M. Thomas, and Harvard University President Drew Gilpin Faust have all done research there. James I. Robertson Jr., of Virginia Tech; Edwin C. Bearss, Historian Emeritus of the National Park Service; and William J. Cooper Jr. of LSU have each served as members of the museum's governing board.

== See also ==
- List of Confederate monuments and memorials
- St. Paul's Episcopal Church (Richmond, Virginia) where Jefferson Davis, Robert E. Lee, and other Confederate leaders worshipped
