= White House of the Confederacy =

Historic house in Virginia, United States

- Second White House of the Confederacy
- U.S. National Register of Historic Places
- U.S. National Historic Landmark
- Virginia Landmarks Register
- Richmond City Historic District
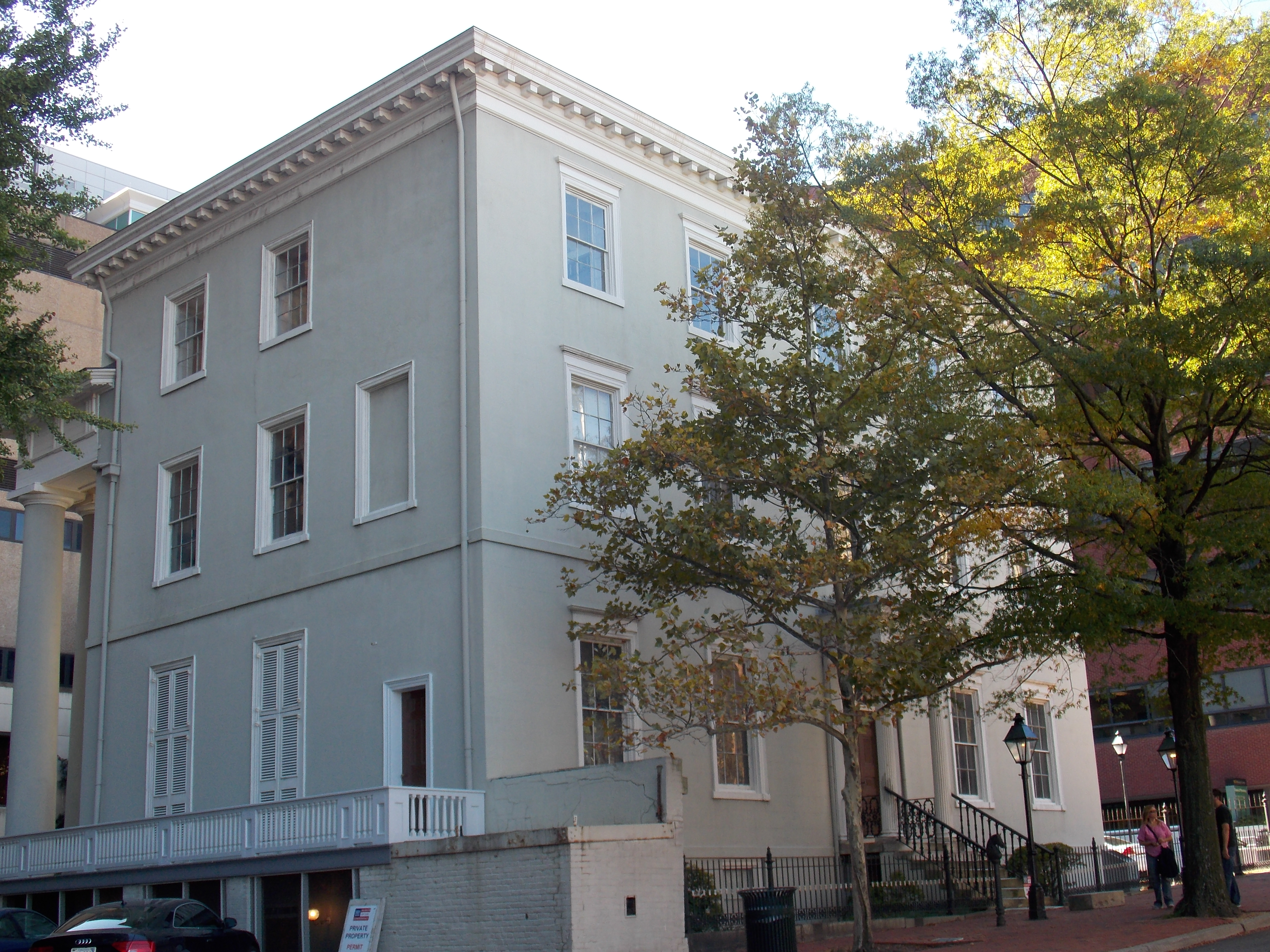
- The Second White House of the Confederacy in Richmond, Virginia, 2015

- Location within Virginia Location within the United States
- Interactive map showing the location of the White House of the Confederacy
- Location: Clay and 12th Sts., Richmond, Virginia, U.S.
- Coordinates: 37°32′27″N 77°25′47″W
- Built: 1818
- Architect: attributed to Robert Mills
- Architectural style: Neoclassical (1818 construction); Greek Revival (1844 modifications); Italianate (1857 additions)
- NRHP reference No.: 66000924
- VLR No.: 127-0115

Significant dates
- Added to NRHP: October 15, 1966
- Designated NHL: December 19, 1960
- Designated VLR: September 9, 1969

The Second White House of the Confederacy is a historic house located in the Court End neighborhood of Richmond, Virginia. Built in 1818, it was the main executive residence of the sole President of the Confederate States of America, Jefferson Davis, from August 1861 until April 1865. It currently sits on the campus of Virginia Commonwealth University.

The Jefferson Davis Executive Mansion was owned by the Confederate Memorial Literary Society from 1894 until 2014, when the Museum of the Confederacy merged with the American Civil War Center. The merged entity is now the American Civil War Museum. It was designated a National Historic Landmark in 1960.

== History ==
The second White House of the Confederacy is a gray stuccoed neoclassical mansion built in 1818 by John Brockenbrough, who was president of the Bank of Virginia. Designed by Robert Mills, Brockenbrough's second private residence in Richmond was built on K Street (later renamed Clay Street) in Richmond's affluent Shockoe Hill neighborhood (later known as the Court End District), and was two blocks north of the Virginia State Capitol. Among his neighbors were U.S. Chief Justice John Marshall, Aaron Burr's defense attorney John Wickham, and future U.S. Senator Benjamin Watkins Leigh.

Sold by the Brockenbrough family in 1844, the house passed through a succession of wealthy families throughout the antebellum period, including U.S. Congressman and future Confederate Secretary of War James Seddon. Just prior to the American Civil War, Lewis Dabney Crenshaw purchased the house and added a third floor. He sold the home to the City of Richmond.

=== Davis family ===
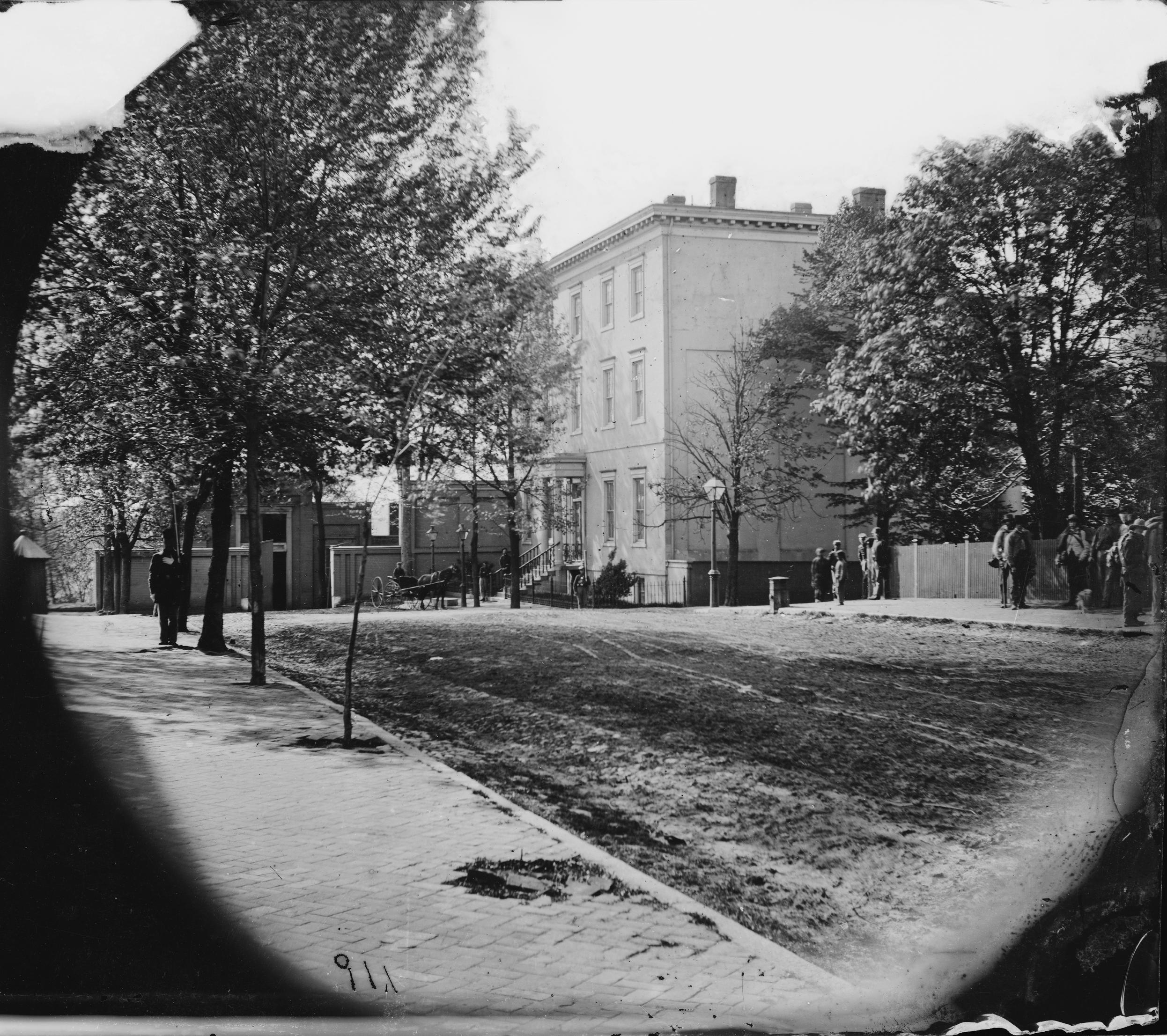
The house in 1865

In May 1861, the capital of the Confederate States of America was moved from Montgomery, Alabama to Richmond, and President Jefferson Davis and his family vacated the First White House of the Confederacy in Montgomery and moved to the house in Richmond, which was leased by the Confederate government from the city.

The Davis family was quite young during their stay at the house. When they moved in, the family consisted of the president and first lady, six-year-old Margaret, four-year-old Jefferson Davis, Jr., and two-year-old Joseph. The two youngest Davis children, William and Varina Anne ("Winnie"), were born in the house, in 1861 and 1864, respectively. Among their neighborhood playmates was George Smith Patton, whose father commanded the 22nd Virginia Infantry, and whose son commanded the U.S. Third Army in World War Two. Joseph Davis died in the spring of 1864, after a 15-foot fall from the railing on the house's east portico. Mrs. Davis' mother and sister were occasional visitors to the Confederate executive mansion.

Davis suffered recurring bouts of malaria, facial neuralgia, cataracts (in his left eye), unhealed wounds from the Mexican War, including bone spurs in his heel, and insomnia. As a result, Davis maintained an at-home office on the second floor of the house, where his personal secretary Colonel Burton Harrison also resided. (This was not an unusual practice at the time, and the West Wing of the White House in Washington, D.C., was similarly added during the Theodore Roosevelt administration.)

The house was abandoned during the evacuation of Richmond on April 2, 1865, and within twelve hours had been seized intact by soldiers from Major General Godfrey Weitzel's XVIII Corps. President Abraham Lincoln, who was in nearby City Point (now Hopewell, Virginia), traveled up the James River to tour the captured city, and visited Davis' former residence for about three hours – although the President only toured the first floor, feeling it would be improper to visit the more private second floor of another man's home. Admiral David Dixon Porter accompanied Lincoln during the visit. They held a number of meetings with local officials in the house, including Confederate Brigadier General Joseph Reid Anderson, who owned the Tredegar Iron Works.

=== After the war ===
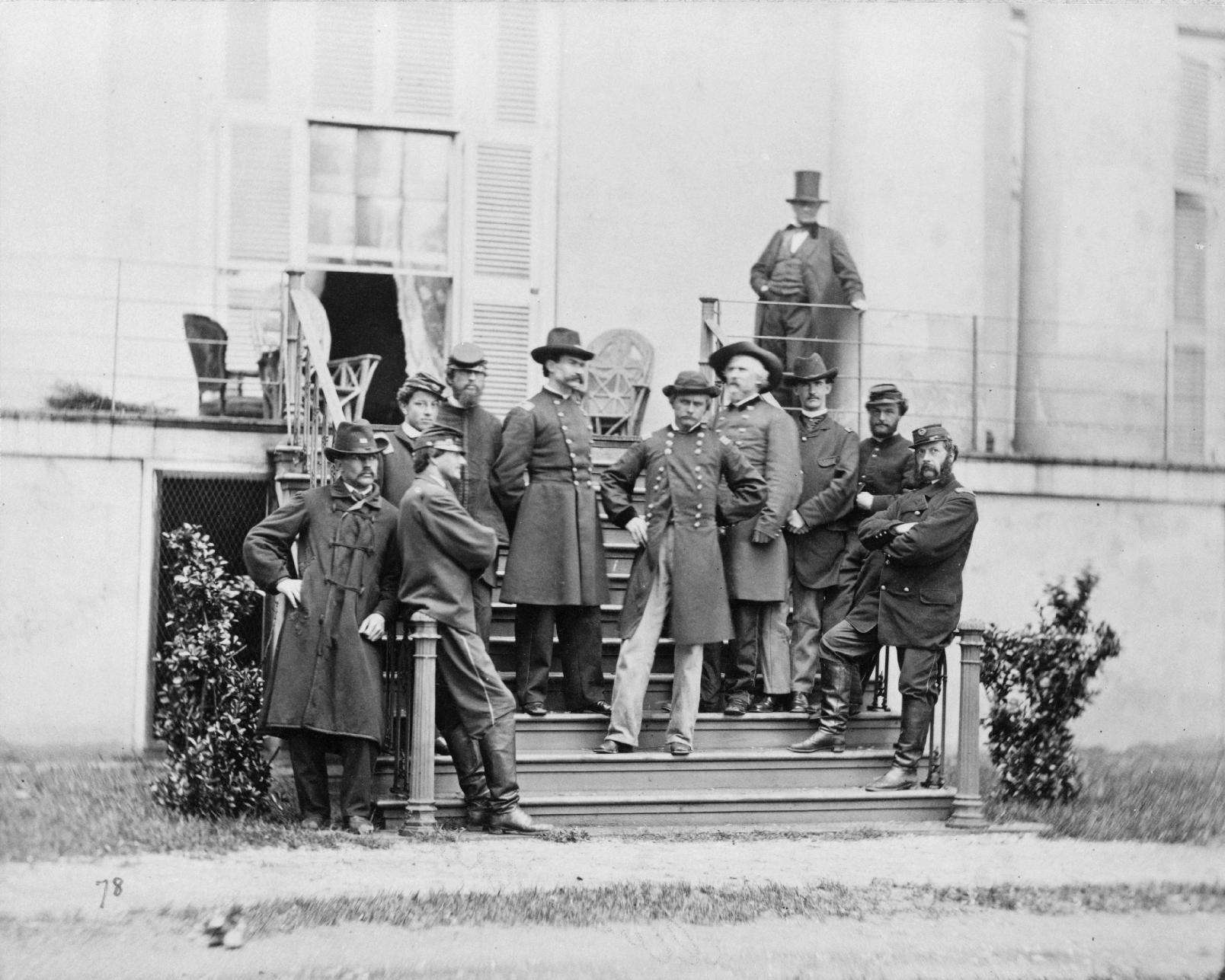
US Maj. Gen. Edward Ord and his staff on the South Portico of the house in 1865

During Reconstruction, the house was the headquarters for Military District Number One (Virginia), and was occasionally used as the residence of the commanding officer of the Department of Virginia. Among those who served there were Major Generals Edward O.C. Ord, Alfred Terry, Henry Halleck, and Edward R.S. Canby.

When Reconstruction ended in Virginia in October 1870, the city of Richmond retook possession of the house, and used it as Richmond Central School, one of the first public schools in postwar Richmond.

=== Confederate museum, 1896–1976 ===
When the city announced its plans to demolish the building to make way for a more modern school building in 1890, the Confederate Memorial Literary Society was formed with the sole purpose of saving the house from destruction.

The CMLS raised funds to start a museum and acquired the deed to the property from the city of Richmond. Opened to the public in 1896, the house became the home of the Confederate Museum (later renamed the Museum of the Confederacy) for eight decades. As an interpretation of the house museum's relevance, the name "White House of the Confederacy" began common use. The name "Gray House" was also used in reference to the house's actual color. The structure was added to the National Register of Historic Places in 1960, was listed as a National Historic Landmark in 1966, and was added to the Virginia Landmark Register in 1969. When the Museum of the Confederacy completed construction of a purpose-built museum building in 1976, the collections and exhibits were moved to the new building.

=== Restoration, 1976–1988 ===
A view of the interior

From 1976 to 1988, the museum led a full-scale restoration of the mansion, which ultimately returned the exterior and the first and second floor interiors to their wartime appearance. Critically acclaimed for the extensive attention to detail during restoration, for its full complement of period furnishings, and for its fair quantity of relevant pieces from its original furnishings, the historic house reopened for public tours in June 1988.

== See also ==
- List of National Historic Landmarks in Virginia
- National Register of Historic Places listings in Richmond, Virginia
- Ellen Barnes McGinnis, enslaved woman who worked in the home as the personal maid to Varina Davis
