= Ellen Barnes McGinnis =

American enslaved woman (1842–1890)

- Born: 1842; Richmond, Virginia, U.S.
- Died: December 12, 1890 (aged 47–48)
- Spouse(s): Charles Barnes Frederick McGinnis (m. 1867)

Ellen Barnes McGinnis (1842 – December 12, 1890) was an enslaved woman known for being the housemaid to Varina Davis, the First Lady of the Confederacy. After gaining her freedom, McGinnis and her husband relocated to Baltimore.

== Biography ==
Ellen Barnes was born enslaved in Richmond, Virginia around 1842. Light-skinned, she was considered "mulatto" and could pass as white. She was owned by Peter W. Grubbs, a Richmond businessman and pharmacist. Ellen could not read or write.

=== Confederate White House ===
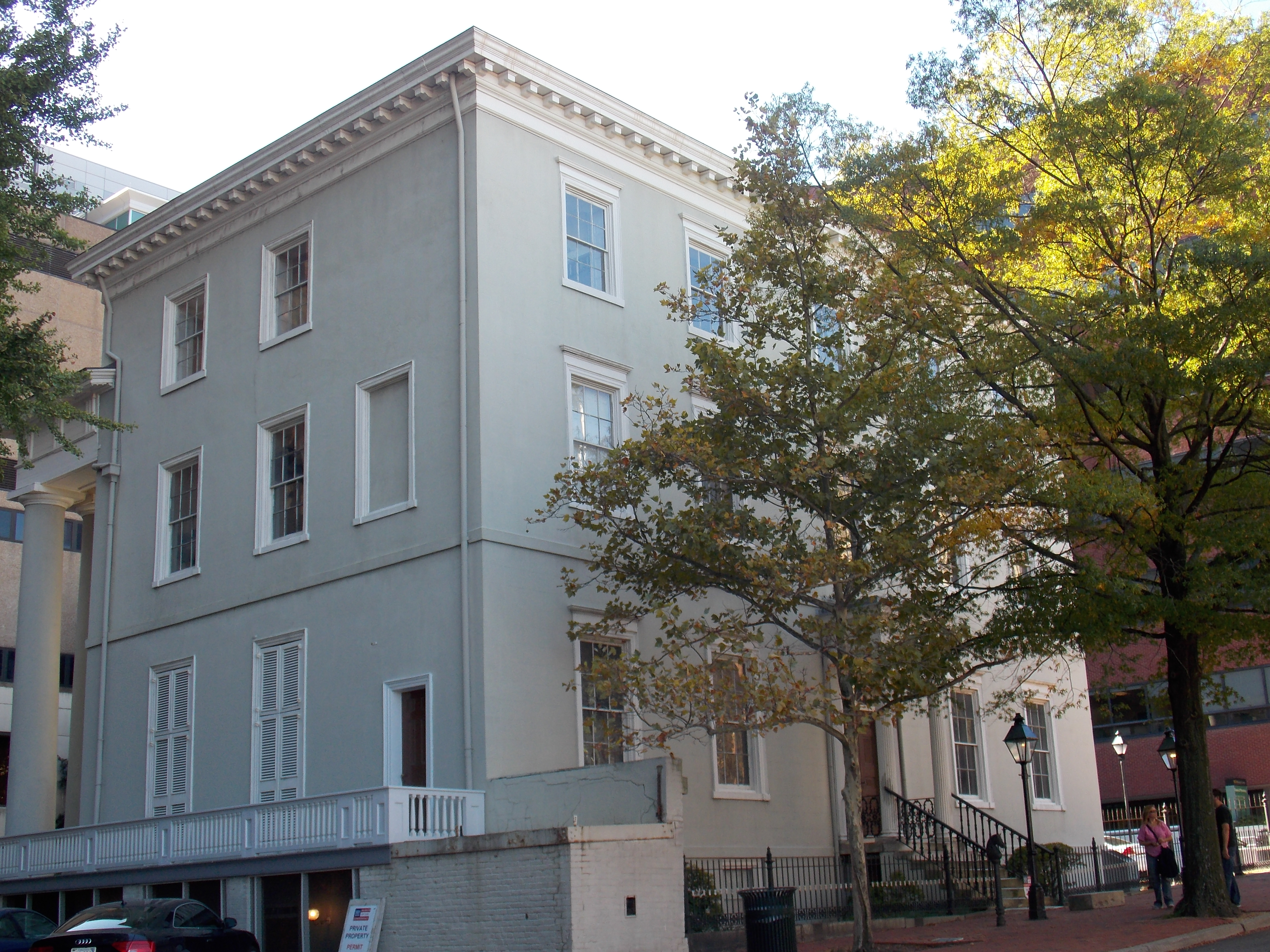
White House of the Confederacy, Richmond Virginia

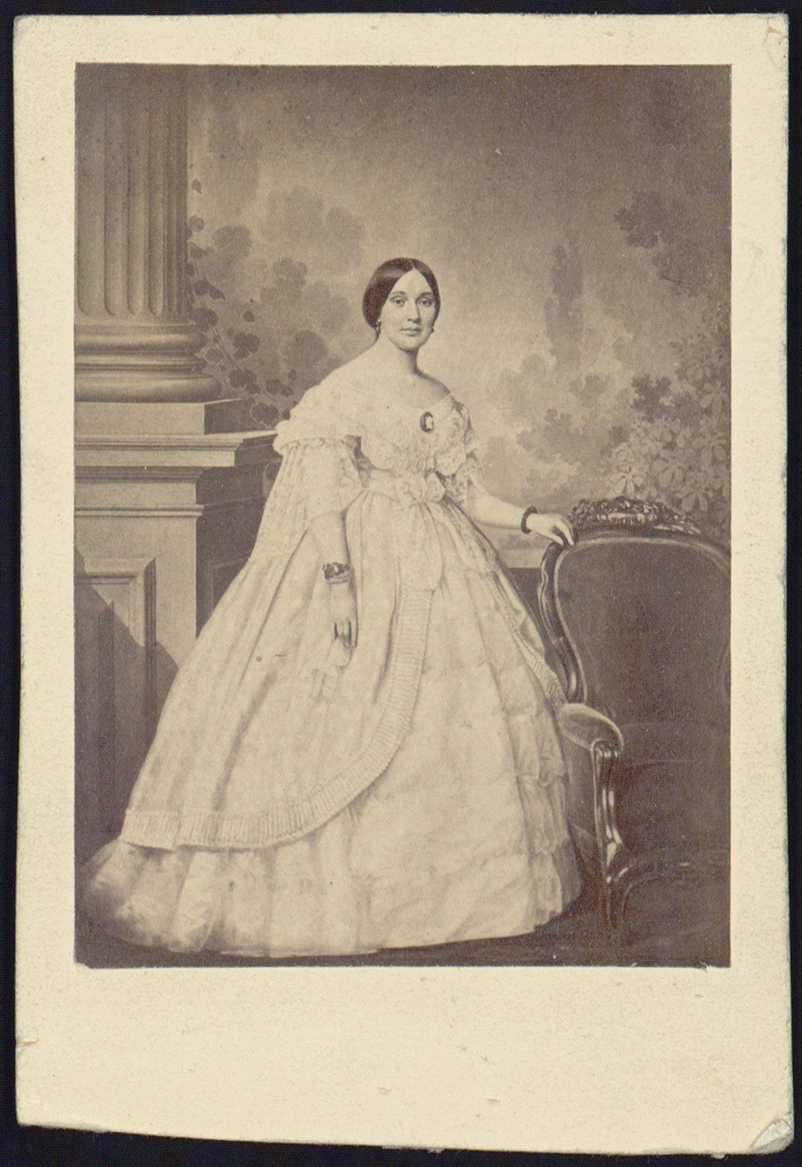
Varina Davis, at the time of the Confederacy

On January 2, 1864, Barnes was leased to the Davis family to work at the Confederate White House to mind the family's children. Her husband Charles Barnes had already escaped to freedom in the North. At the time of Ellen's service to the Davis family, the Confederacy was in full decline, and life in the presidential household was difficult.

In 1864, several of the Davis family slaves escaped, including Varina's most trusted maid, "Betsy". Ellen would then become Varina's personal maid and the nursemaid to the Davises youngest child, Varina Anne Davis, also known as "Winnie".

=== Flight from Richmond ===
In the last days of the Confederacy, Ellen Barnes remained with Varina Davis. In late March 1865, Barnes fled with the family from the Confederate capital as they looked for passage to Europe.

After travelling for weeks through the South to escape, two Union cavalry units came upon the Davis party, after trailing them for several days. Varina Davis asked Barnes to shield her husband, Jefferson Davis by fleeing with him into the woods. Barnes complied, with the former President of the Confederacy trailing her wearing a shawl over his head as a disguise.

The party was eventually captured, and Jefferson Davis was imprisoned at Fort Monroe. Varina Davis's request to accompany him to prison was denied, and she was put under house arrest. Barnes then parted ways with the Davis family to join her husband, telling a journalist at the time,

“Oh, no, Sir, I never want to go South again as a slave -- I would rather be free, much rather. Mrs. Davis was good to me, but I don't want to be her slave, for all that."

=== Freedom ===
Barnes would remain in contact with Varina Davis after finding freedom. After her husband Charles died, Barnes would reconnect with the Davis family and accompany them to Montreal. Reportedly when she went back to work, she did not charge for her services as the Davis family had no means to pay them. She would later marry Frederick McGinnis, the former slave to Confederate General P.G.T. Beauregard and personal servant to Jefferson Davis at Fort Monroe. The couple married on May 7, 1867 in Norfolk, Virginia. Varina Davis reportedly would help make her wedding dress and attended their wedding in Virginia.

After their wedding, Frederick and Ellen Barnes McGinnis moved to Baltimore, Maryland. The pair would remain in contact with the Davis family for the rest of their lives. Frederick would manage correspondence for Ellen, who was illiterate. In Baltimore, Frederick and Ellen McGinnis reportedly had several children and "many kind friends". They refused offers to return to the South, despite offers by Jefferson Davis to provide them property.

=== Death ===
Ellen died on December 12, 1890 at age 48. Frederick would die six years later in an accident and was buried in Baltimore's Laurel Cemetery.

== See also ==
- Picture of Ellen Barnes from Encyclopedia Virginia
