= West Hospital =

Hospital building in Virginia, US

Coordinates: 37°32′21.8″N 77°25′50.1″W

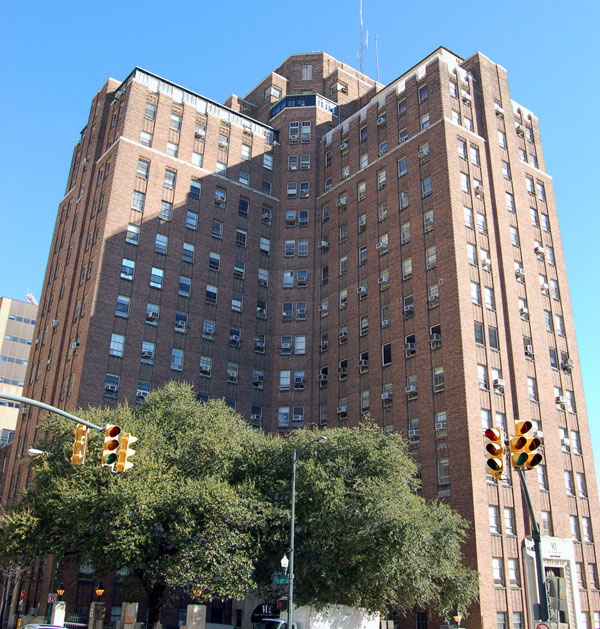
West Hospital from the corner of Broad and 12th Streets

Plaque on hospital's west auditorium entrance

West Hospital is a building on the Medical College of Virginia Campus of Virginia Commonwealth University noted for its Art Deco architecture. It was commissioned by the Federal Works Agency;Public Works Administration and dedicated in 1940. Then known as the "New MCV Hospital", it was the fourth tallest building in Richmond when it opened to national acclaim in 1941, and is still among the tallest.

The seventeen-story building, in Richmond's Court End, is in a cruciform shape. On the entrance of the building's west auditorium, a plaque (pictured) indicates that "on this site the Virginia convention ratified the United States Constitution June 25, 1788." The building was originally slated for demolition as part of the VCU 2020 plan, but has since gotten a reprieve. The Alliance to Conserve Old Richmond Neighborhoods (ACORN) opposed the demolition.

Historic preservationists were outraged when VCU announced a master plan in 2004 that called for the demolition the West Hospital and an adjacent eight-story Art Deco building, completed in 1938, known as the A.D. Williams Clinic. Despite opposition, the A.D. Williams clinic was demolished in 2010. The updated 2020 master plan calls for short-term renovations to the West Hospital to “allow continued use of the building for the foreseeable future primarily as an office facility serving the MCV Campus.” The board of visitors approved more than $5 million in renovation work on two floors of the building.

The Center for Endocrinology, Diabetes and Metabolism located in the building offers added convenience and improved access to care by bringing together clinical and specialized support services for children with diabetes, obesity and other endocrine disorders. Children's Hospital of Richmond at VCU offers the most comprehensive pediatric endocrine program in Central Virginia, and the facility is the region's only endocrinology center to offer treatment, clinical trials, education, medical nutrition therapy and psychological support in one location.Children’s Hospital of Richmond – Center for Endocrinology, Diabetes and Metabolism — VCU Maps
