= Rob Havers =

British military historian (born 1967)

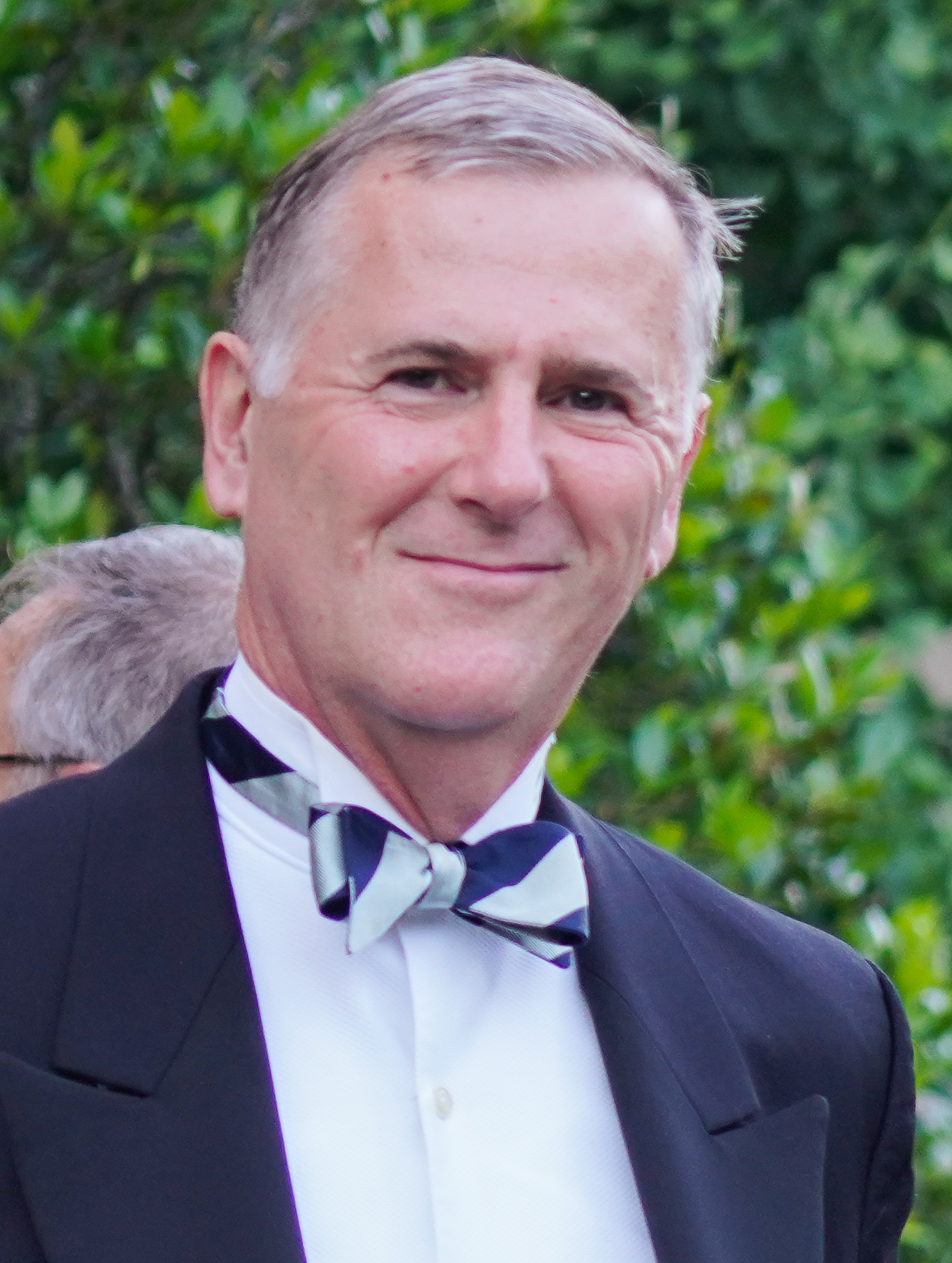
- Havers in 2026
- Born: November 1967 (age 58)

Academic background
- Education: Queen Mary University of London, London School of Economics, Pembroke College, Cambridge

Academic work
- Discipline: History
- Institutions: Westminster College

Robin Paul Whittick "Rob" Havers (born 1967) is a British military historian. He currently serves as president of the American Civil War Museum. He was the former president of the Pritzker Military Museum & Library, the former president of the George C. Marshall Foundation, and a former Senior Lecturer in War Studies at the Royal Military Academy Sandhurst.

== Education ==
Havers graduated from Queen Mary University of London with a bachelor's degree in history and politics; London School of Economics and Political Science with a master's degree in later modern British history and Pembroke College, Cambridge with a Ph.D.

He is the author of several articles and books. His Ph.D. thesis, "Reassessing the Japanese POW Experience: The Changi POW Camp, 1942-45," was published as a book in 2003 and subsequently reissued in paperback in 2013.

== Career ==
Havers served as a professor of War Studies at Sandhurst and taught at the London School of Economics and Political Science and Cambridge. He was visiting professor at Westminster College. He was executive director of the National Churchill Museum.

He served as president of the George C. Marshall Foundation. He came to this post from his previous position as executive director of The National Churchill Museum and vice president for the Churchill Institute at Westminster College, located in Fulton, Missouri. On 4 February 2018, Havers became the CEO of the Pritzker Military Museum & Library in Chicago, Illinois. On 1 February 2021, the American Civil War Museum announced that Havers had joined their institution as President & CEO.

== Works ==
- The Changi Prisoner of War Camp: From Myth to History. Richmond: Curzon. 2002. ISBN 0700716572.
- Reassessing the Japanese Prisoner of War Experience, Routledge, 2003. ISBN 9780700716579
- Badsey, S.; Grove, M.; Havers, R. (2004). The Falklands Conflict Twenty Years On: Lessons for the Future. Taylor & Francis. ISBN 978-1-134-26855-9.
