= South Carolina Historical Society =

State historical society

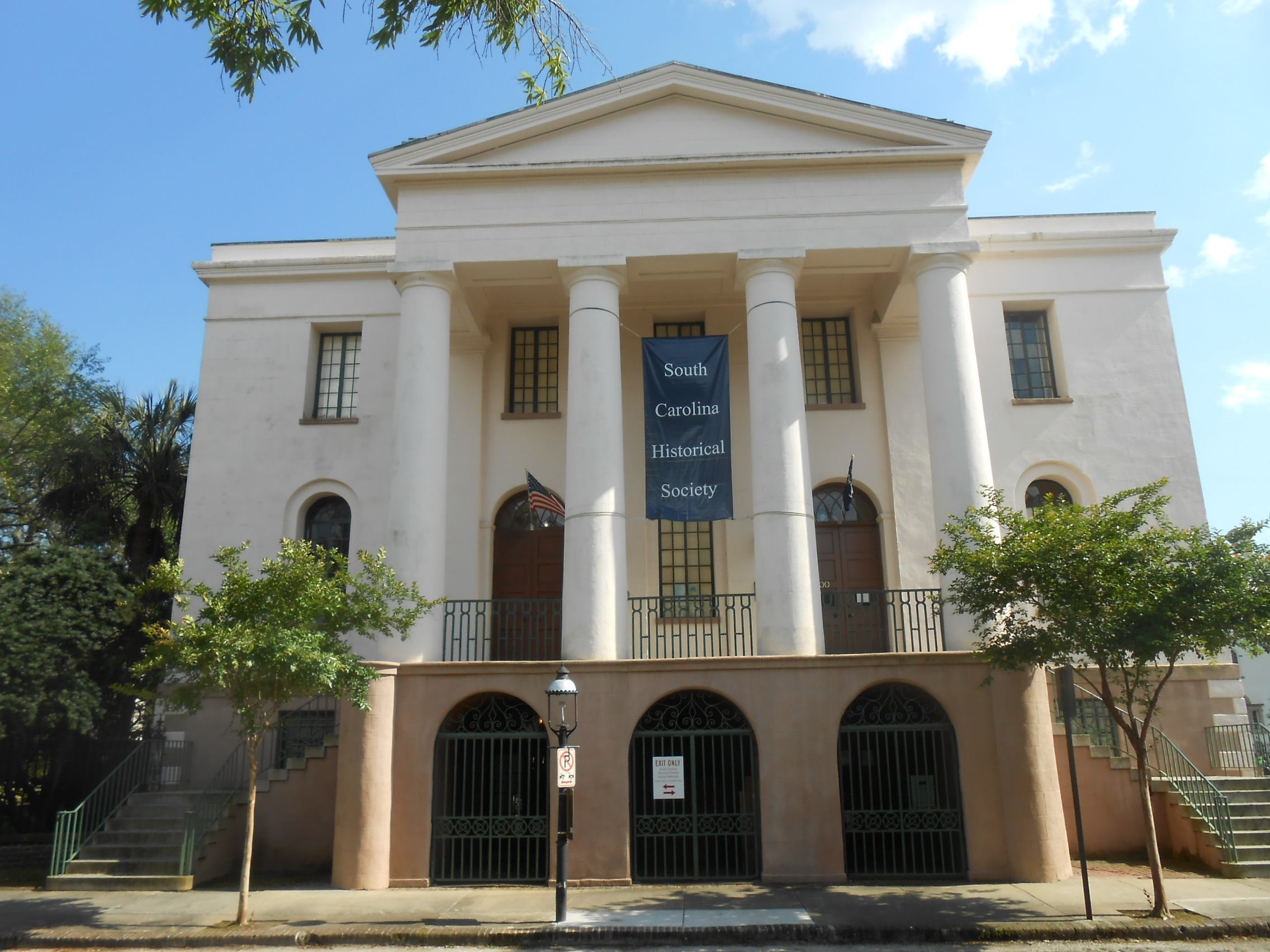
- The South Carolina Historical Society is located in the Fireproof Building.
- Formation: 1855
- Type: Historical Society
- Headquarters: Robert Mills Fireproof Building; 100 Meeting Street; Charleston, South Carolina
- Website: South Carolina Historical Society

The South Carolina Historical Society is a private, non-profit organization founded in 1855 to preserve South Carolina's rich historical legacy. The SCHS is the state's oldest and largest private repository of books, letters, journals, maps, drawings, and photographs about South Carolina's history.

== Location ==
The SCHS is housed in the Fireproof Building located at 100 Meeting Street in Charleston, South Carolina. South Carolinian Robert Mills designed the Fireproof Building in 1822 to protect public records. It is the first fireproof structure in the nation built specifically to protect documents. The building is in the Palladian style with Doric porticoes facing north and south. A central three-story oval stairwell with cantilevered stone stairs is lit by skylights located in the cupola.

Mills was the first professionally trained architect born in the United States. He was a federal architect under President Andrew Jackson and designer of many important buildings in Washington, D.C., including the Washington Monument. His Fireproof Building was named a National Historic Landmark in 1973, and major renovations were completed in 2002.

In 2016-7 the building underwent a major renovation, intended to modernize all systems, provide a secure, climate-controlled environment for the storage of historic documents, and to provide both an events venue and a modern museum space. In the summer of 2018 the Historical Society will open completely revamped museum of the history of South Carolina and of the Fireproof Building itself.

== Publications ==
The SCHS began to publish material on South Carolina history the year following its founding, in 1856, with three volumes of its collections prior to the Civil War. The SCHS now produces two publications, the South Carolina Historical Magazine and the Carologue. The South Carolina Historical Magazine, first published in 1900, is the only scholarly periodical entirely devoted to South Carolina history. In 1985 the Society began publication of the Carologue, a quarterly general-interest magazine of articles, illustrations, and photographs on state history, genealogy, preservation, and Society news.

== Collection ==
The SCHS collections contain records from the pre-colonial period to the present; a wide variety of personal documents; diaries; records of scholarly research; and plantation, business, and church records. Also in the collection are maps and plats; architectural drawings; genealogical charts; over 30,000 photographs and prints; and 50,000 books, pamphlets, and serials. The SCHS also owns one of the nation's largest collections of Confederate imprints.

The South Carolina Historical Society does not receive local, state, or federal funding.

== See also ==
- List of historical societies in South Carolina

== Some works that reference the SCHS collections ==
- Loretto Dennis Szucs and Sandra Hargreaves Luebking, The source : a guidebook of American genealogy, 2006.
- Sharon DeBartolo Carmack, and Erin Nevius, The family tree resource book for genealogists, 2004.
- Leigh Fought, Southern Womanhood and Slavery: A Biography of Louisa S. McCord, 1810-1879, 2003.
- Barbara L. Bellows, A Talent for Living: Josephine Pinckney and the Charleston Literary Tradition, 2006.
- Charles J. Holden, In the Great Maelstrom: Conservatives in Post-Civil War South Carolina, 2002.
- John Michael Vlach, The Planter's Prospect: Privilege and Slavery in Plantation Paintings, 2002.
- Robert R. Weyeneth, Historic Preservation for a Living City: Historic Charleston Foundation, 1947-1997, 2000.
