= John Brockenbrough =

American businessman (1775–1852)

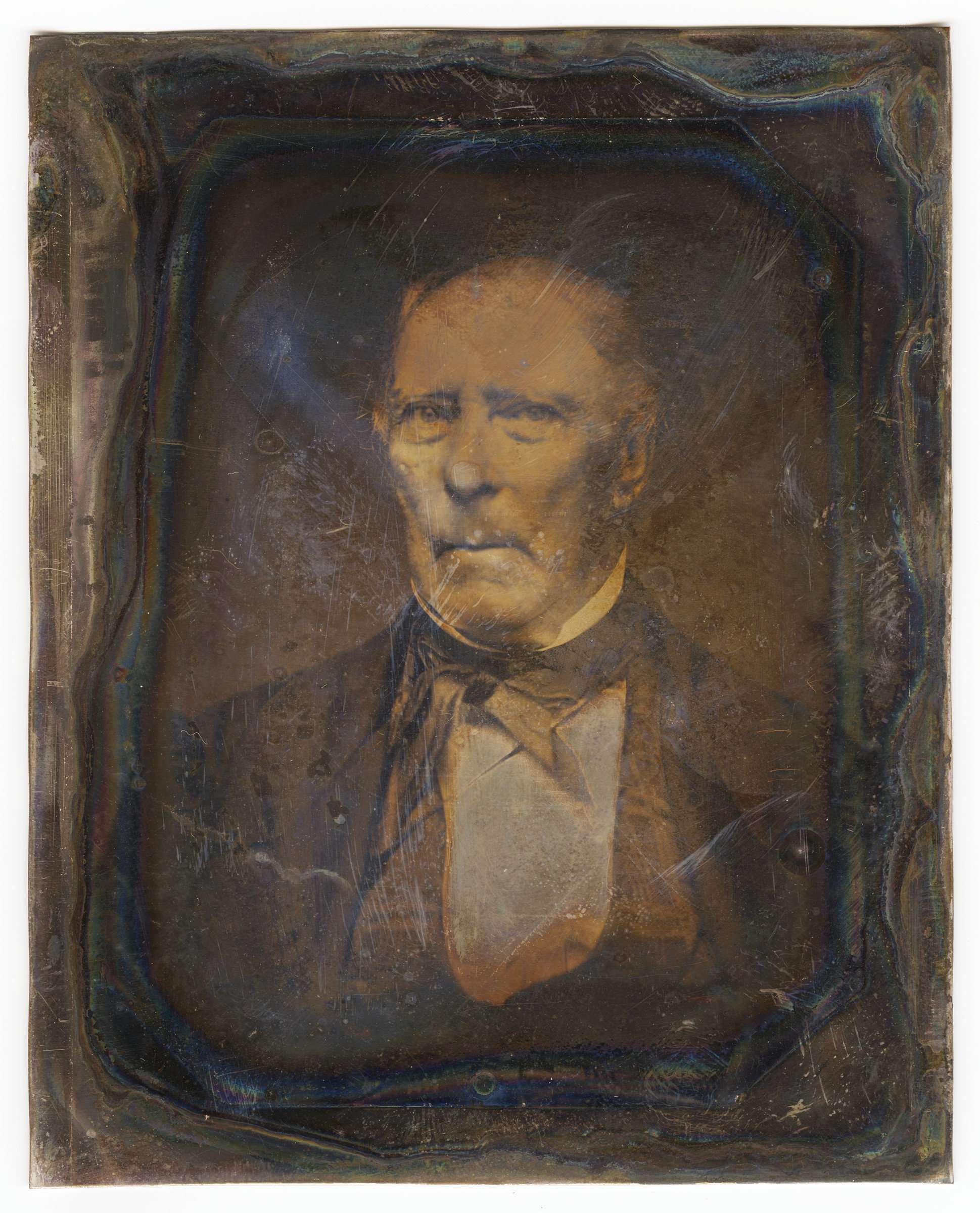
c. 1846 Daguerreotype portrait of Brockenbrough from "James River and Kanawha Company Directors and Employees."

John Brockenbrough (1775–1852) was a business man and civic leader in Richmond, Virginia. He was an "intimate friend" and frequent correspondent of John Randolph of Roanoke. He was president of the Bank of Virginia. His home in Richmond's Court End District later served as the White House of the Confederacy.

== Career ==
Brockenbrough received his M.D. from the University of Edinburgh in Scotland in 1795. He returned to his native Virginia in April 1797 and married Gabriella Harvie Randolph, the widow of Thomas Mann Randolph Sr. Brockenbrough did not actively practice medicine but was involved in civic and business enterprises. Correspondence between Brockenbrough and Thomas Jefferson, largely on business matters, has been preserved by the National Archives in the Jefferson Papers.

In 1835, Brockenbrough was elected a member of the American Philosophical Society.

== Brockenbrough House, White House of the Confederacy ==
In 1818, John Brockenbrough commissioned the building of a large residence. The house was built on two adjoining lots overlooking the Shockoe Valley. It is typically attributed to Robert Mills, a prominent American neo-classical architect and acquaintance of John Brockenbrough. The home, typical of Richmond's finer early nineteenth-century dwellings, was two stories tall with a slate flat roof. The principal floor featured a parlor, drawing room and dining room, while the bedrooms were upstairs. A kitchen and servants’ residence were located in an adjoining outbuilding. A garden was built.

In 1861, the Brockenbrough House, as it was then known, became the Executive Mansion of the Confederate States of America, which became known as the White House of the Confederacy. It was the official residence of President Jefferson Davis, his wife Varina and their children, the house was also the social, political and military center of the Confederacy during the American Civil War (1861–1865).

After use for a number of years as a school, the Confederate Museum opened on February 22, 1896, in the former White House of the Confederacy. Today, the gray stuccoed Brockenbrough House has been preserved as a National Historical Landmark and is part of the Museum of the Confederacy complex 3 blocks north of the Virginia State Capitol in Richmond.
