= Confederate imprint =

Works printed in the Confederate States of America

South Carolina Declaration of Secession, Charleston, 1860

Confederate imprints are books, pamphlets, broadsides, newspapers, periodicals or sheet music printed in the Confederate States of America in a location which, at the time, was under Confederate and not Union control. Confederate imprints are important as sources of the history of the Civil War and many institutional libraries have formed large collections of these works. A number of checklists and bibliographies of them have been published, one of which catalogs 9,457 imprints.

== Printing in the South ==
Prior to Secession, the South manufactured relatively few books, but imported them heavily from Northern cities such as New York, Boston, and Philadelphia. In 1860, there were only four major book publishers in the South, although there were numerous small job printers. Of even greater concern was that the South manufactured little of its own paper and ink. After Secession, these were no longer available from the North, and the South began to expand its own printing and manufacture of paper and ink. Shortages of these supplies, however, were chronic and often severe.

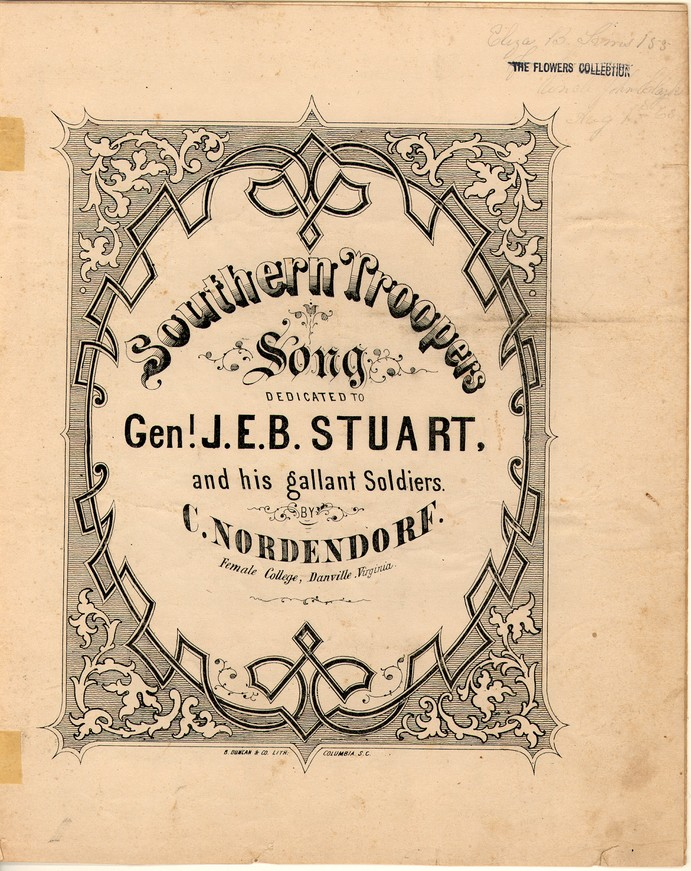
Confederate sheet music, Danville, Virginia c. 1864

== Important collections ==
The following institutions have significant collections of Confederate imprints:

- Boston Athenaeum
- Library of Congress
- Rice University's Fondren Library's Woodson Research Center
- Rosanna Blake Library of Confederate History at Marshall University
- Virginia Historical Society
- Duke University's Rubenstein Rare Book & Manuscript Library
- American Civil War Museum's Museum of the Confederacy Collection
- South Carolina Historical Society
- The Hargrett Rare Book and Manuscript Library at University of Georgia
- The Rare Book & Manuscript Library (University of Illinois at Urbana-Champaign)
- The Division of Special Collections at The University of Alabama

== Bibliographies of Confederate imprints ==
- Crandall, Marjorie Lyle. Confederate Imprints: A Checklist Based Principally on the Collection of the Boston Athenaeum. Boston: The Boston Atheneaum, 1955.digitized version
- Harwell, Richard. Confederate belles-lettres, a bibliography and a finding list of the fiction, poetry, drama, songsters, and miscellaneous literature published in the Confederate States of America. Hattiesburg, Miss.: The Book Farm, 1941.
- Harwell, Richard. Cornerstones of Confederate Collecting. Charlottesville: University of Virginia Press for the Bibliographical Society of the University of Virginia, 1953.
- Harwell, Richard. More Confederate Imprints. Richmond: Virginia State Library, 1957.
- Harwell, Richard. In Tall Cotton: The 200 Most Important Confederate Books. Austin: Jenkins Pub. Co., 1978.
- Harwell, Richard. Confederate Imprints. Wendell, N.C.: Broadfoot's Bookmark, 1982.
- Parrish, T. Michael and Robert M. Willingham, Jr. Confederate Imprints: A Bibliography of Southern Publications from Secession to Surrender. Austin, TX : Jenkins Publishing Co. & Katonah, NY: Gary A Foster, n.d.
- Rudolph, E. L. Confederate Broadside Verse: A Bibliography and Finding List of Confederate broadside ballads and songs. New Braunfels, Texas: Book Farm, 1950.

== See also ==
- Confederate paper currency
- Confederate postage stamps
