= Mary Wingfield Scott =

American historic preservationist

- Born: July 30, 1895; Richmond, Virginia
- Died: August 9, 1983 (aged 85); Richmond, Virginia
- Education: Bryn Mawr College, Barnard College, University of Chicago
- Occupations: historic preservationist, author
- Partner(s): Virginia Reese Withers; Rachel Wilson

Mary Wingfield Scott (1895–1983) was an American historic preservationist who documented Richmond, Virginia neighborhoods and advocated for preservation over demolition.

== Biography ==
Scott was born on July 30, 1895, in Richmond, Virginia. She attended Bryn Mawr College from 1914 through 1916 and graduated from Barnard College in 1921. She received a doctorate in art history from the University of Chicago in the mid-1930s. She went on to teach at Westhampton College, a women's college now part of University of Richmond.

Scott became interested in architecture and began photographing and writing about Richmond buildings. She was active in the creation of the Preservation Virginia organization. In 1935 she was instrumental in the preservation of the Adam Craig House, a dilapidated 18th century house in the Shockoe Bottom neighborhood. She wrote two books about Richmond neighborhoods and houses; Houses of Old Richmond in 1941 and Old Richmond Neighborhoods in 1950.

Scott advocated for preservation during the rebuilding efforts following World War II and on into the urban renewal programs of the 1960s. She published the Old Richmond News, a newsletter dedicated to advocating for saving neighborhoods and encouraging community political involvement. In 1982 Scott was named an honorary member of the American Institute of Architects. Scott died on August 9, 1983, in Richmond.

In 2018 the Virginia Capitol Foundation announced that Scott's name would be included on the Virginia Women's Monument's glass Wall of Honor.

== Personal ==
Scott lived with Virginia Reese Withers (1888–1968) until Withers' death. The couple adopted two children in 1927. Scott's second life partner was Rachel Wilson (1892–1986). The three women are buried together in Hollywood Cemetery in Richmond.
