= Richmond, Virginia =

Capital city of Virginia, United States

Richmond
- State capital and independent city
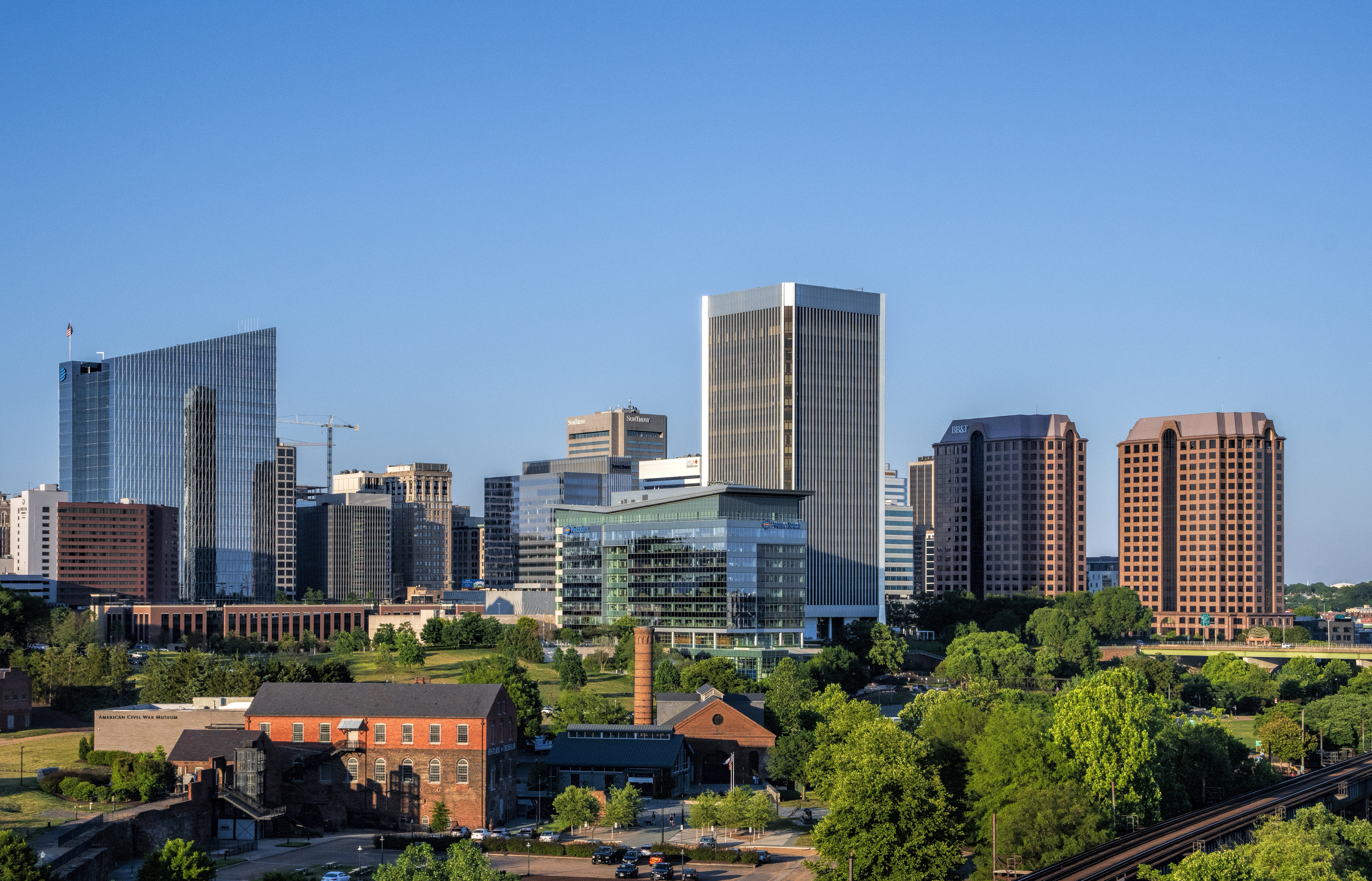
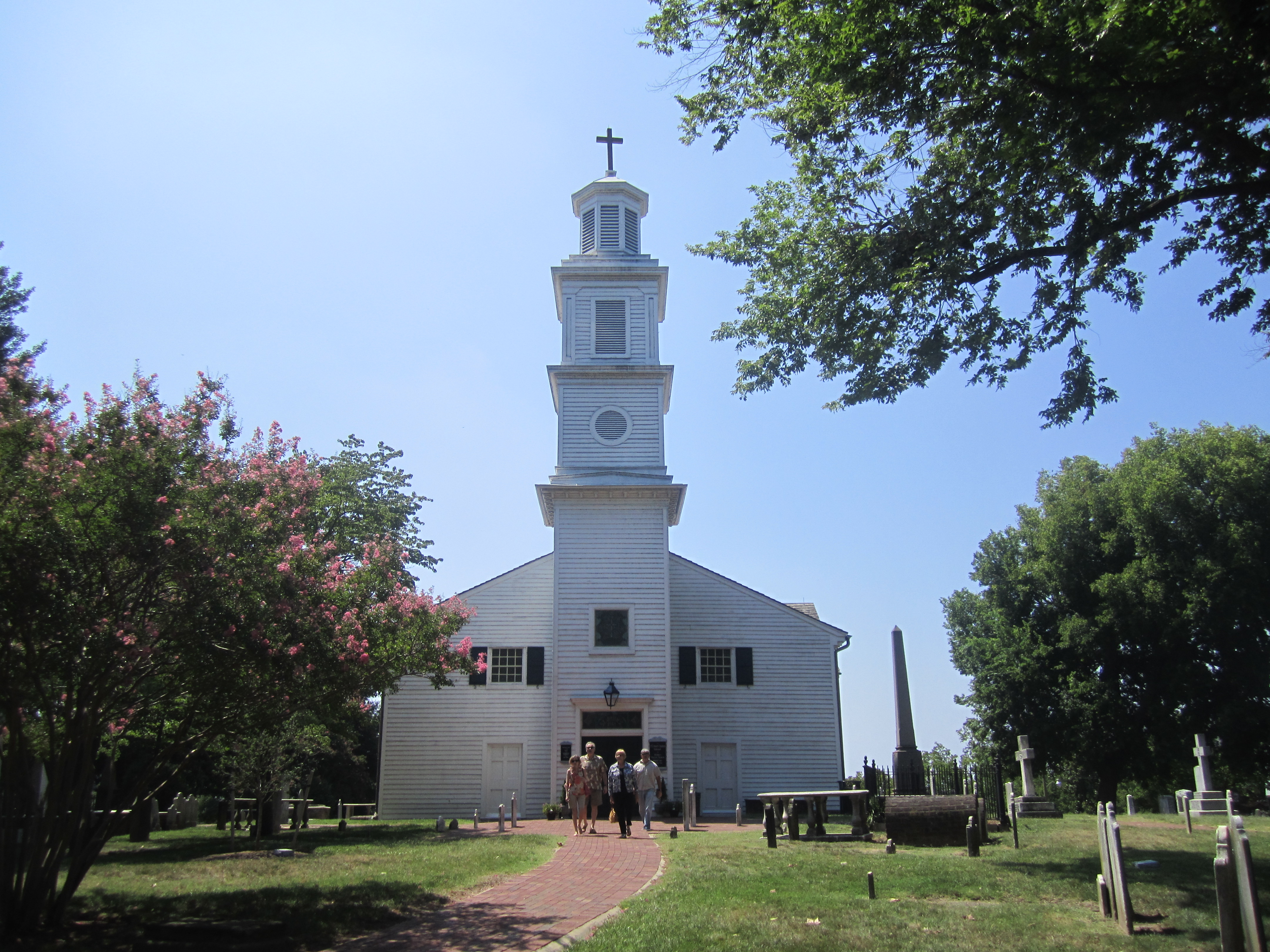
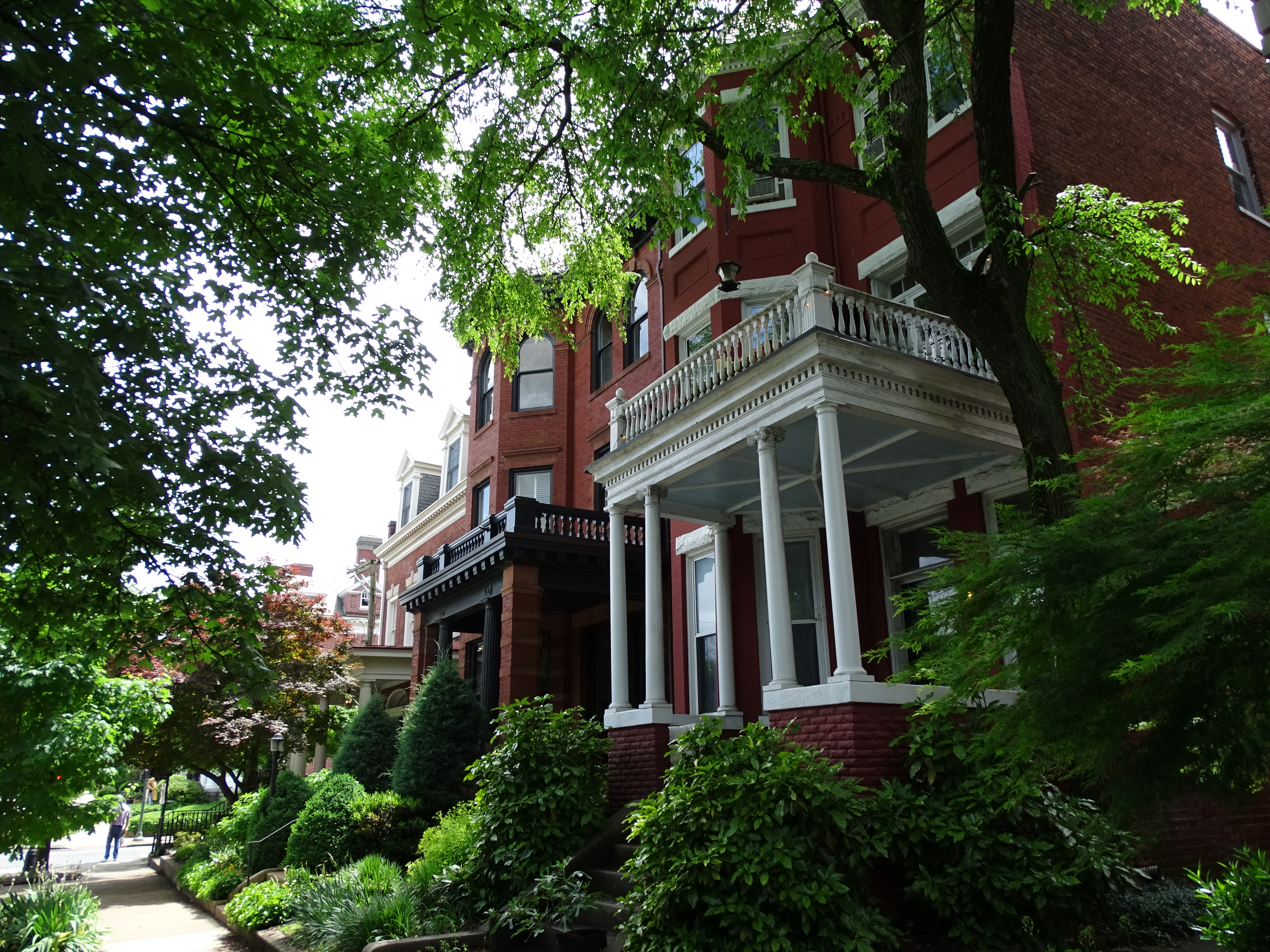
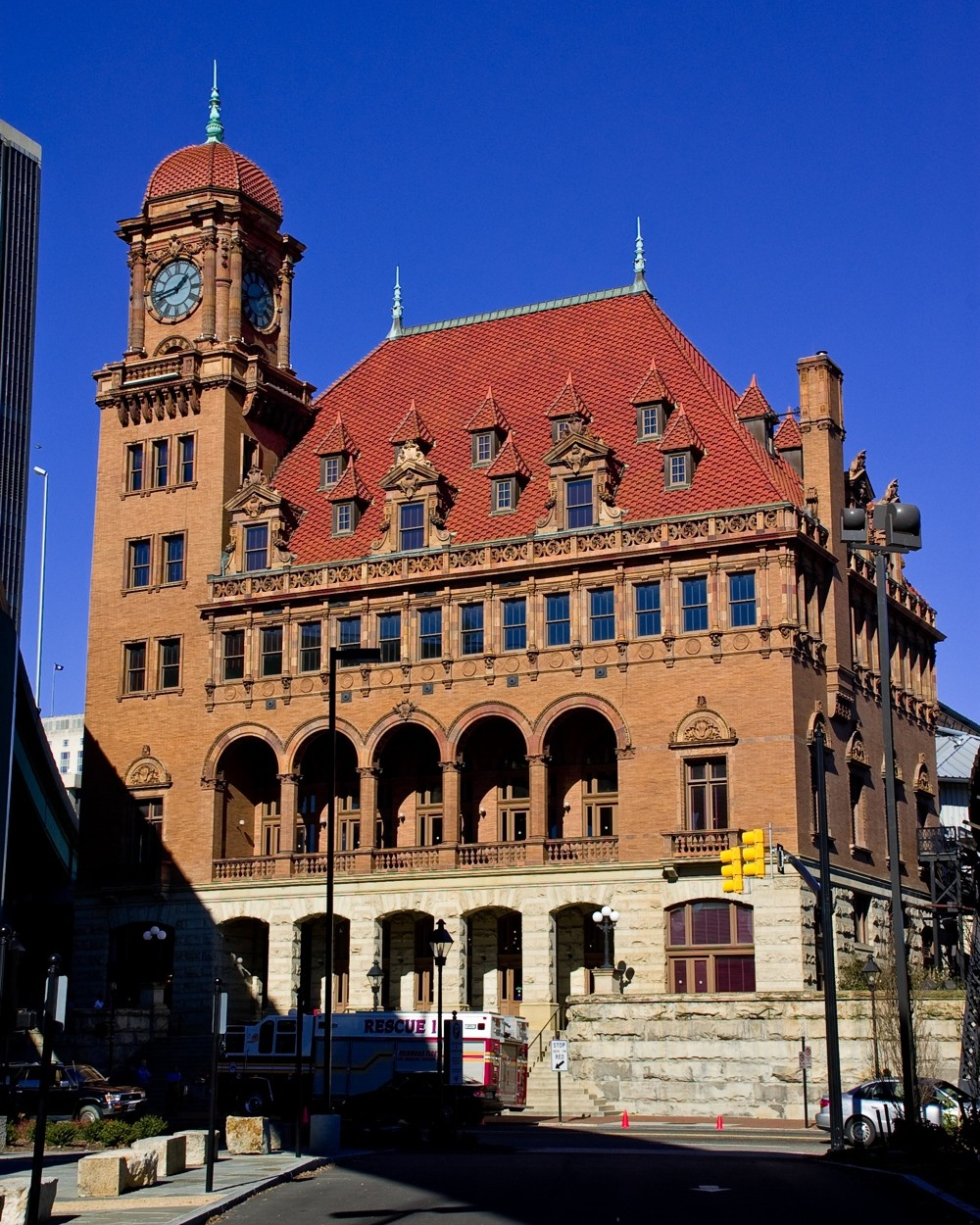
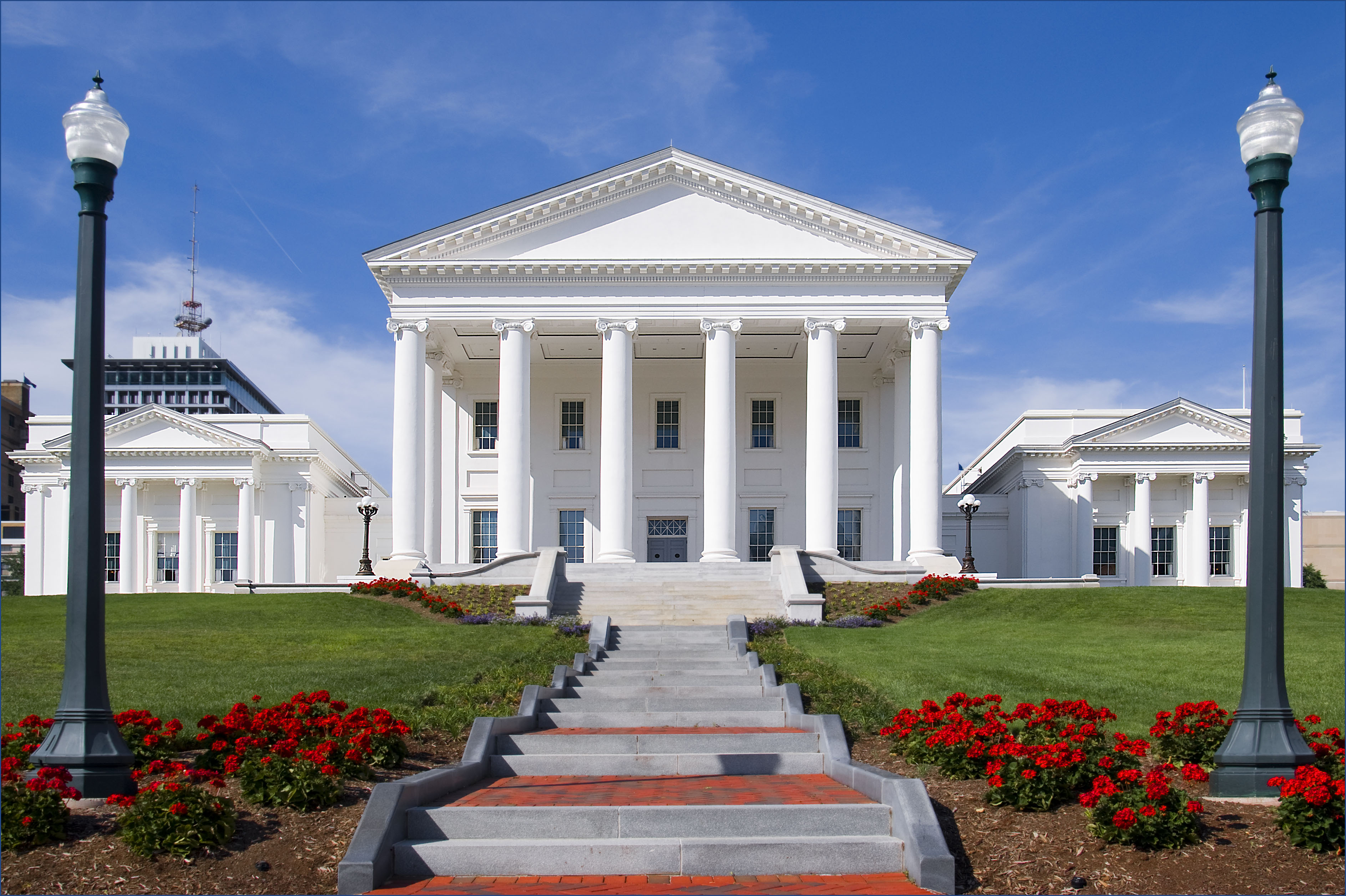
- Downtown skyline along the James River St. John's Episcopal Church Monument Avenue Main Street Station Virginia State Capitol Virginia Commonwealth University Virginia Museum of Fine Arts

- Flag Seal
- Nicknames: "RVA", "River City"
- Motto: Latin: Sic Itur Ad Astra (Thus do we reach the stars)
- Interactive map of Richmond
- Location within Virginia Location within the contiguous United States
- Coordinates: 37°32′27″N 77°26′12″W
- Country: United States
- State: Virginia
- Incorporated: 1742
- Named for: Richmond, London

Government
  - Mayor: Danny Avula (D)

Area
  - City: 62.57 sq mi (162.05 km^{2})
  - Land: 59.92 sq mi (155.20 km^{2})
  - Water: 2.64 sq mi (6.85 km^{2})
- Elevation: 213 ft (65 m)

Population (2020)
  - City: 226,610
  - Estimate (2025): 237,257 ▲
  - Rank: 99th in the United States; 4th in Virginia
  - Density: 3,845.5/sq mi (1,484.75/km^{2})
  - Urban: 1,059,150 (US: 44th)
  - Urban density: 2,067/sq mi (798.2/km^{2})
  - Metro: 1,339,182 (US: 44th)
- Demonym: Richmonder

GDP
  - Metro: $116.960 billion (2023)
- Time zone: UTC−5 (EST)
  - Summer (DST): UTC−4 (EDT)
- ZIP Codes: 23173, 23218–23242, 23249–23250, 23255, 23260–23261, 23269, 23273–23274, 23276, 23278–23279, 23282, 23284–23286, 23288–23295, 23297–23298
- Area codes: 804 and 686
- FIPS code: 51-67000
- GNIS feature ID: 1499957
- Website: rva.gov

Richmond (/ˈrɪtʃmənd/, RITCH-mənd) is the capital city of the U.S. state of Virginia. Incorporated in 1742, Richmond has been an independent city since 1871. It is the fourth-most populous city in Virginia, with a population of 226,610 at the 2020 census. The Richmond metropolitan area, with over 1.37 million residents, is the third-most populous metropolitan area in Virginia and 44th-largest in the United States. Richmond is located at the James River's fall line.

Richmond was an important village in the Powhatan Confederacy and was briefly settled by English colonists from Jamestown from 1609 to 1611. Founded in 1737, it replaced Williamsburg as the capital of the Colony and Dominion of Virginia in 1780. During the Revolutionary War period, several notable events occurred in the city, including Patrick Henry's "Give me liberty or give me death!" speech in 1775 at St. John's Church and the passage of the Virginia Statute for Religious Freedom written by Thomas Jefferson. During the American Civil War, Richmond was the capital of the Confederate States of America.

Law, finance, and government primarily drive Richmond's economy. The downtown area is home to federal, state, and local governmental agencies as well as notable legal and banking firms. The greater metropolitan area includes several Fortune 500 companies: Performance Food Group, Altria, CarMax, Dominion Energy, Markel, Owens and Minor, Genworth Financial, and ARKO Corp. The city is one of about a dozen to have both a U.S. Court of Appeals and a Federal Reserve Bank.

== History ==
=== Colonial era ===
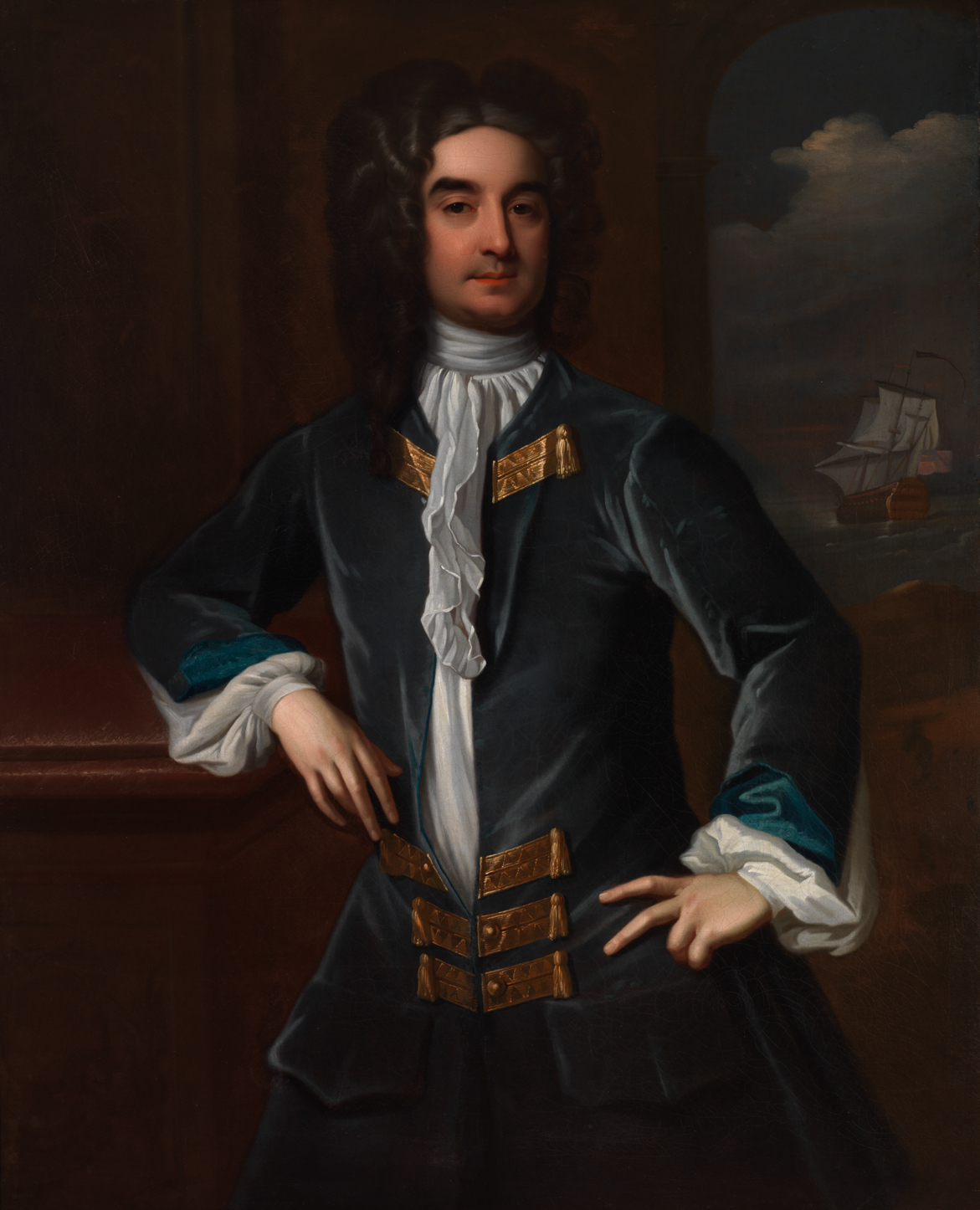
William Byrd II is considered the founder of Richmond. The Byrd family, which includes Harry F. Byrd, has been central to Virginia's history since its founding.

After the first permanent English-speaking settlement was established at Jamestown, Virginia, in April 1607, Captain Christopher Newport led explorers northwest up the James River to an inhabited area in the Powhatan Nation, which takes its name from the location Pawat-hanne, or "falls in a stream," referring to the falls in the James River at present day Richmond, specifically Powhatan Hill.

Richmond was Arrohattoc territory where Arrohateck village was located. However, as time progressed relations between the Arrohattocs and English colonists declined, and by 1609 the tribe was unwilling to trade with the settlers. As the population began to dwindle, the tribe declined and was last mentioned in a 1610 report by the visiting William Strachey. By 1611 the tribe's Henrico town was found to be deserted when Sir Thomas Dale went to use the land to found Henricus.

In 1611, the first European settlement in Central Virginia was established at Henricus, where the Falling Creek empties into the James River. In 1619, early Virginia Company settlers established the Falling Creek Ironworks there. Decades of conflicts between the Powhatan and the settlers followed, including the Battle of Bloody Run, fought near Richmond in 1656, after tensions arose from an influx of Manahoacs and Nahyssans from the North. Nonetheless, the James Falls area saw more white settlement in the late 1600s and early 1700s.

In early 1737, planter William Byrd II commissioned Major William Mayo to lay out the original town grid, completed in April. Byrd named the city after the English town of Richmond near (and now part of) London, because the view of the James River's bend at the fall line reminded him of his home at Richmond Hill on the River Thames. In 1742, the settlement was incorporated as a town.

=== American Revolution ===
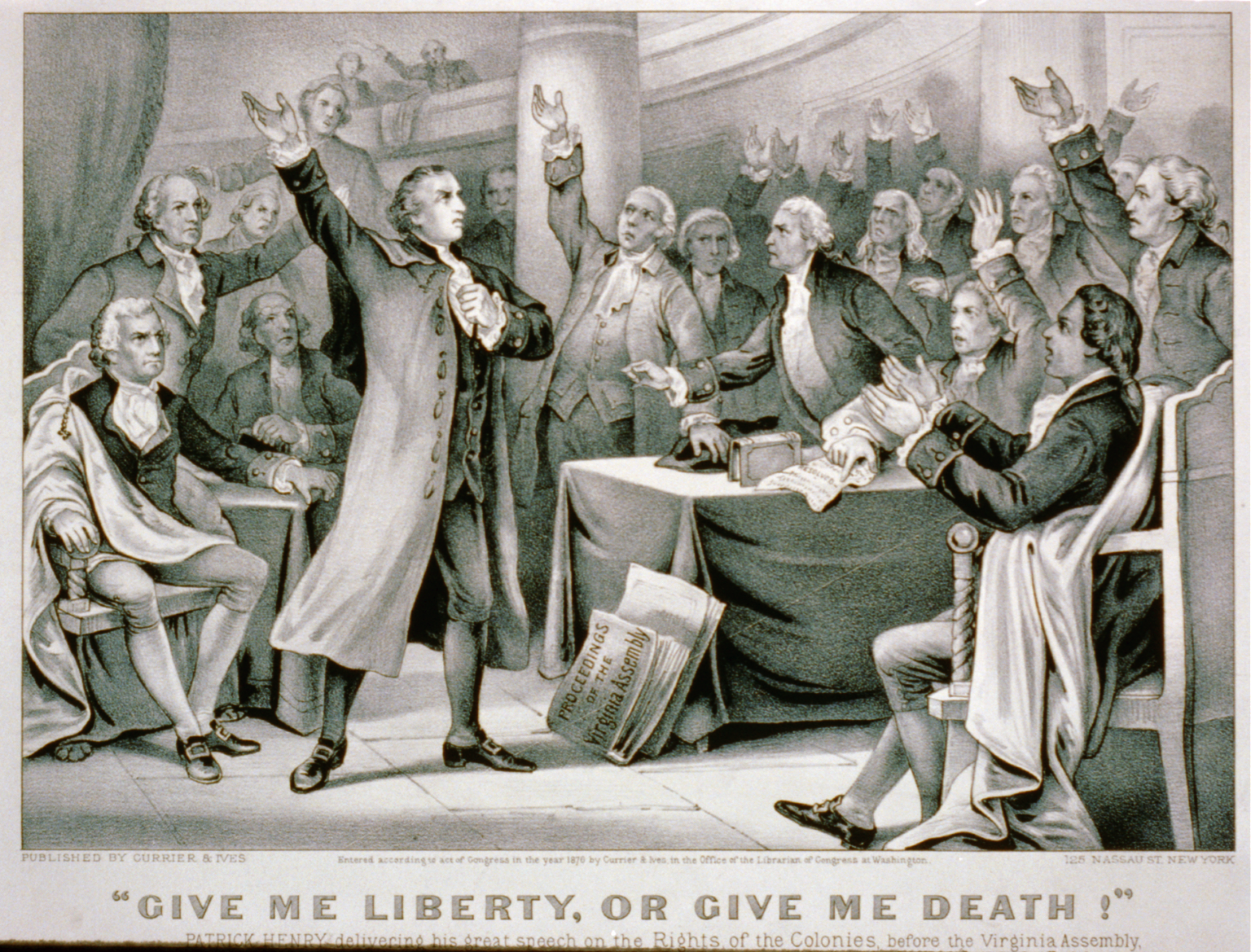
Patrick Henry delivered his "Give me liberty or give me death!" speech at St. John's Church in Richmond, helping to ignite the American Revolution.

In 1775, Patrick Henry delivered his famous "Give me liberty or give me death!" speech in Richmond's St. John's Church, greatly influencing Virginia's participation in the First Continental Congress and the course of the American Revolution. On April 18, 1780, the state capital was moved from Williamsburg to Richmond, providing a more centralized location for Virginia's increasing western population and theoretically isolating the capital from a British attack from the coast. In 1781, Loyalist troops led by Benedict Arnold led a raid on Richmond and burnt it, leading Governor Thomas Jefferson to flee while the Virginian militia, led by Sampson Mathews, unsuccessfully defended the city.

=== Early United States ===
Richmond recovered quickly from the war, thriving within a year of its burning. In 1786, the Virginia Statute for Religious Freedom, drafted by Thomas Jefferson, was enacted, separating church and state and advancing the legal principle for freedom of religion in the United States. In 1788, the Virginia State Capitol, designed by Jefferson and Charles-Louis Clérisseau in the Greek Revival style, was completed.

To bypass Richmond's rapids on the upper James River and provide a water route across the Appalachian Mountains to the Kanawha River, which flows westward into the Ohio River and converges with the Mississippi River, George Washington helped design the James River and Kanawha Canal. The canal started in Westham and cut east to Richmond, facilitating the transfer of cargo from flat-bottomed James River bateaux above the fall line to the ocean-faring ships below. The canal boatmen legacy is represented by the figure in the center of the city flag.

Because of the canal and the hydropower the falls generated, Richmond emerged as an important industrial center after the American Revolutionary War (1775–1783). It became home to some of the largest manufacturing facilities, including iron works and flour mills, in the South and the country.

The City of Richmond was officially part of Henrico County until 1842, when it became a fully independent city. By 1850, Richmond was connected by the Richmond and Petersburg Railroad to Port Walthall, where ships carrying over 200 tons of cargo could connect to Baltimore or Philadelphia. Passenger liners could reach Norfolk, Virginia, through the Hampton Roads harbor. In the 19th century, Richmond was connected to the North by the Richmond, Fredericksburg, and Potomac Railroad, later replaced by CSXT.

The railroad also was used by some to escape slavery in the mid-19th century. In 1849, Henry "Box" Brown had himself nailed into a small box and shipped from Richmond to abolitionists in Philadelphia through Baltimore's President Street Station on the Philadelphia, Wilmington and Baltimore Railroad, often used by the Underground Railroad to assist escaping disguised slaves reach the free state of Pennsylvania.

=== American Civil War ===
Five days after the Confederate attack on Fort Sumter, the Virginia Convention voted on April 17, 1861, to secede from the United States, pending ratification by popular vote. On May 20, 1861, the Confederate States Congress voted to move its national capital from Montgomery, Alabama, to Richmond, and three days later, on May 23, 1861, Virginia voters ratified the Ordinance of Secession, making the action official.

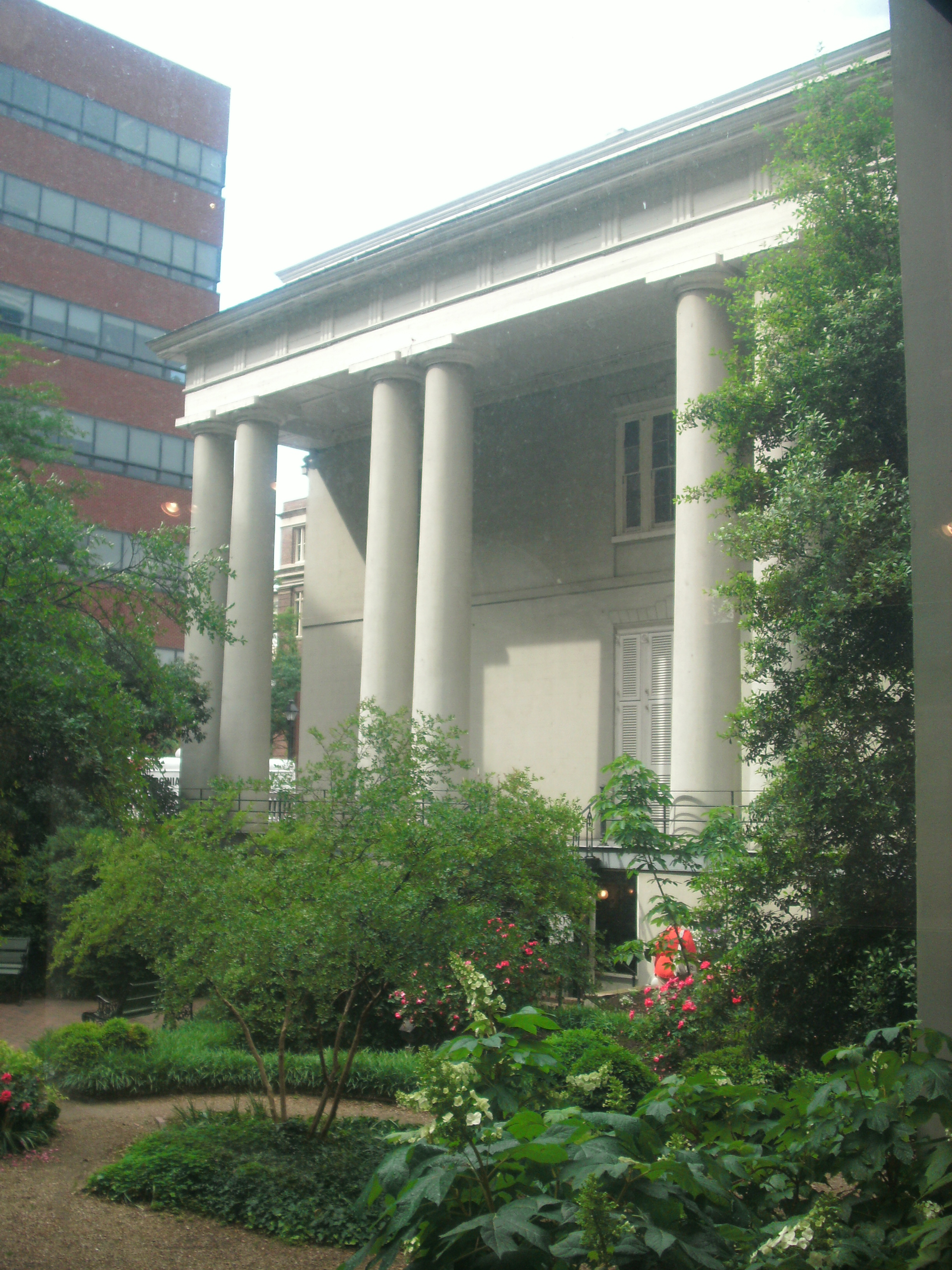
The White House of the Confederacy

Richmond held local, state and national Confederate government offices, hospitals, a railroad hub, and one of the largest slave markets. It also had the largest Confederate arms factory, the Tredegar Iron Works. The factory produced artillery and other munitions, including heavy ordnance machinery and the 723 tons of armor plating that covered the CSS Virginia, the world's first ironclad ship used in war. The Confederate States Congress shared quarters in the Jefferson-designed Virginia State Capitol with the Virginia General Assembly. The Confederacy's executive mansion, known as the "White House of the Confederacy", was two blocks away on Clay Street.

Historians and critic argue the move was risky because Richmond's proximity to Washington made it a prime Union target, but Confederate leaders accepted that danger to secure Virginia's industrial power and symbolic prestige. James Robertson Jr.'s quotation editors from Richmond Dispatch, underscores the prevalent 1861 consensus that Richmond's political, industrial, and symbolic significance rendered it the Confederacy's most vital stronghold, the loss of which would effectively undermine Southern resistance.

Located about 100 mi (160 km) from the national capital, Washington, D.C., Richmond was at the end of a long supply line and difficult to defend. For four years, its defense required the bulk of the Army of Northern Virginia and the Confederacy's best troops and commanders. The Union army made Richmond a main target in the campaigns of 1862 and 1864–65. In late June and early July 1862, Union General-in-Chief George B. McClellan threatened but failed to take Richmond under the defensive doctrine of Joseph E. Johnston, in the Seven Days Battles of the Peninsula campaign. Three years later, Richmond became indefensible in March 1865 after nearby Petersburg fell and several remaining rail supply lines to the south and southwest were broken.

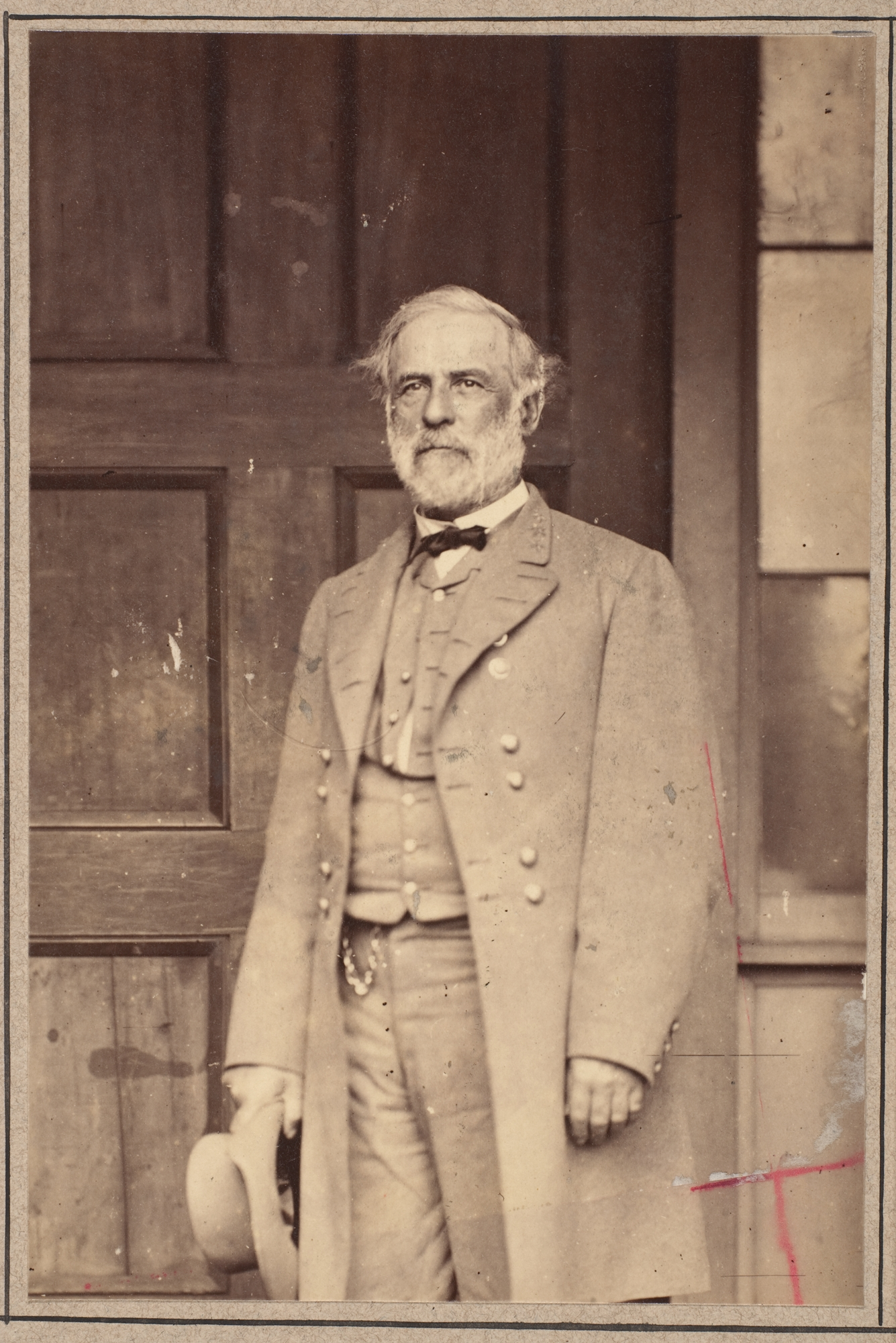
Robert E. Lee at his home in Richmond (1865)

On March 25, Confederate General John B. Gordon's desperate attack on Fort Stedman, east of Petersburg, failed. On April 1, Union Cavalry General Philip Sheridan, assigned to interdict the Southside Railroad, met brigades commanded by Southern General George Pickett at the Five Forks Junction, defeated them, took thousands of prisoners, and advised Union General-in-Chief Ulysses S. Grant to order a general advance. When the Union Sixth Corps broke through Confederate lines on the Boydton Plank Road south of Petersburg, Confederate casualties exceeded 5,000, about a tenth of Lee's defending army. Lee then informed President Jefferson Davis that he intended to evacuate Richmond.

On April 2, 1865, the Confederate Army began Richmond's evacuation. Confederate President Davis and his cabinet, Confederate government archives, and its treasury's gold, left the city that night by train. Confederate officials burned documents and troops burned tobacco and other warehouses to deny the Union any spoils. In the early morning of April 3, Confederate troops exploded the city's gunpowder magazine, killing several paupers in a temporary Almshouse and a man on 2nd St. The concussion shattered windows all over the city. Later that day, General Godfrey Weitzel, commander of the 25th Corps of the United States Colored Troops, accepted Richmond's surrender from the mayor and a group of leading citizens who did not evacuate. Union troops eventually contained the fires, but about 25% of the city's buildings were destroyed.

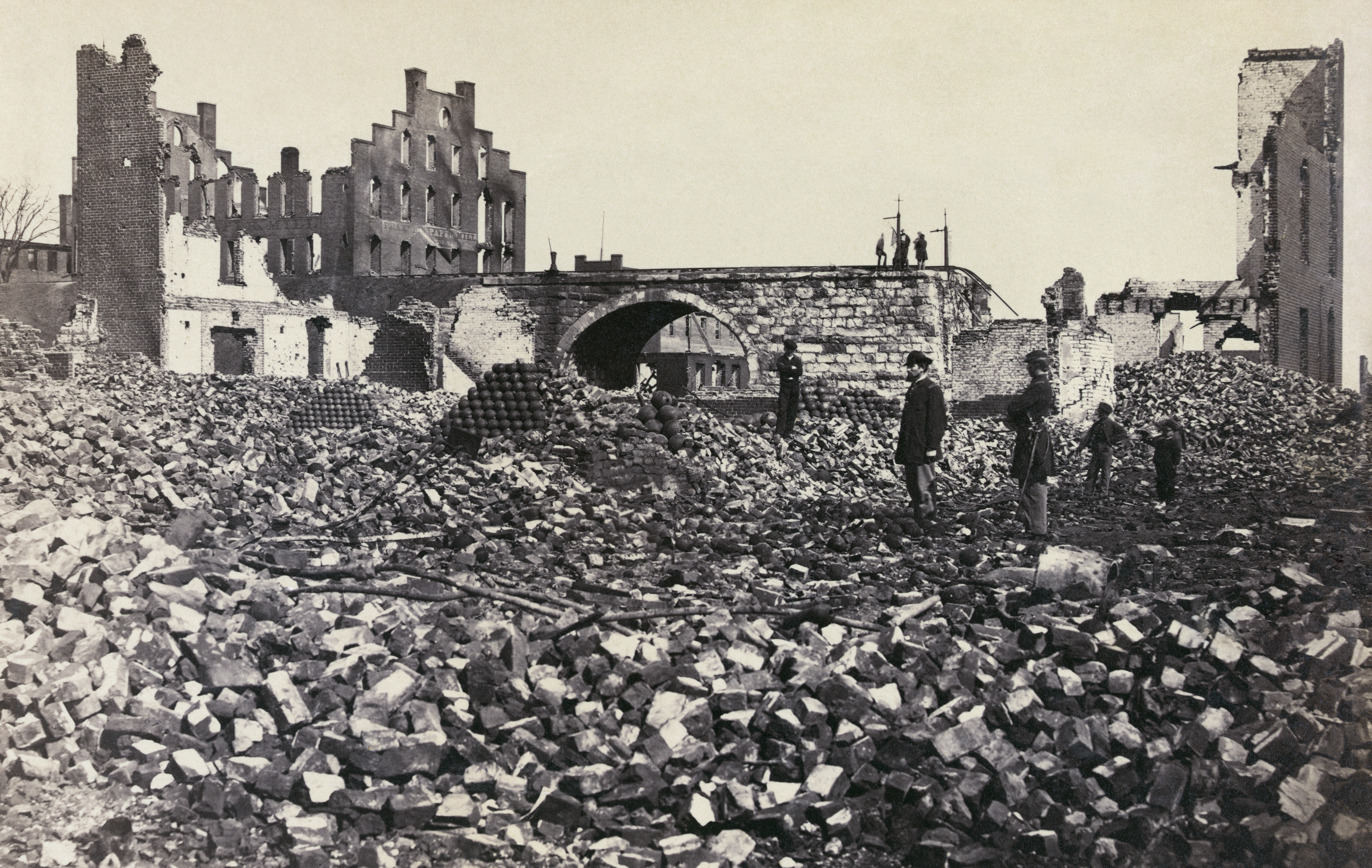
Retreating Confederate troops burned strategic war materials so they would not get into Union hands, but the fires went out of control and one-fourth of Richmond was burned in April 1865.

On April 3, President Abraham Lincoln visited Grant at Petersburg and took a launch up the James River to Richmond on April 4. While Davis attempted to organize the Confederate government in Danville, Lincoln met Confederate Assistant Secretary of War John A. Campbell, handing him a note inviting Virginia's state legislature to end their rebellion. After Campbell spun the note to Confederate legislators as a possible end to the Emancipation Proclamation, Lincoln rescinded his offer and ordered General Weitzel to prevent the state legislature from meeting.

On April 6, Union forces killed, wounded, or captured 8,000 Confederate troops at Sayler's Creek, southwest of Petersburg. The Confederate Army continued a general retreat southwestward, and General Lee continued to reject General Grant's surrender entreaties until Sheridan's infantry and cavalry encircled the shrinking Army of Northern Virginia and cut off its ability to retreat further on April 8. Lee surrendered his remaining approximately 10,000 troops the following morning at Appomattox Court House, meeting Grant at the McLean Home.

Davis was captured on May 10 near Irwinville, Georgia and taken back to Virginia, where he was imprisoned for two years at Fort Monroe until he was freed on bail.

=== Postbellum ===
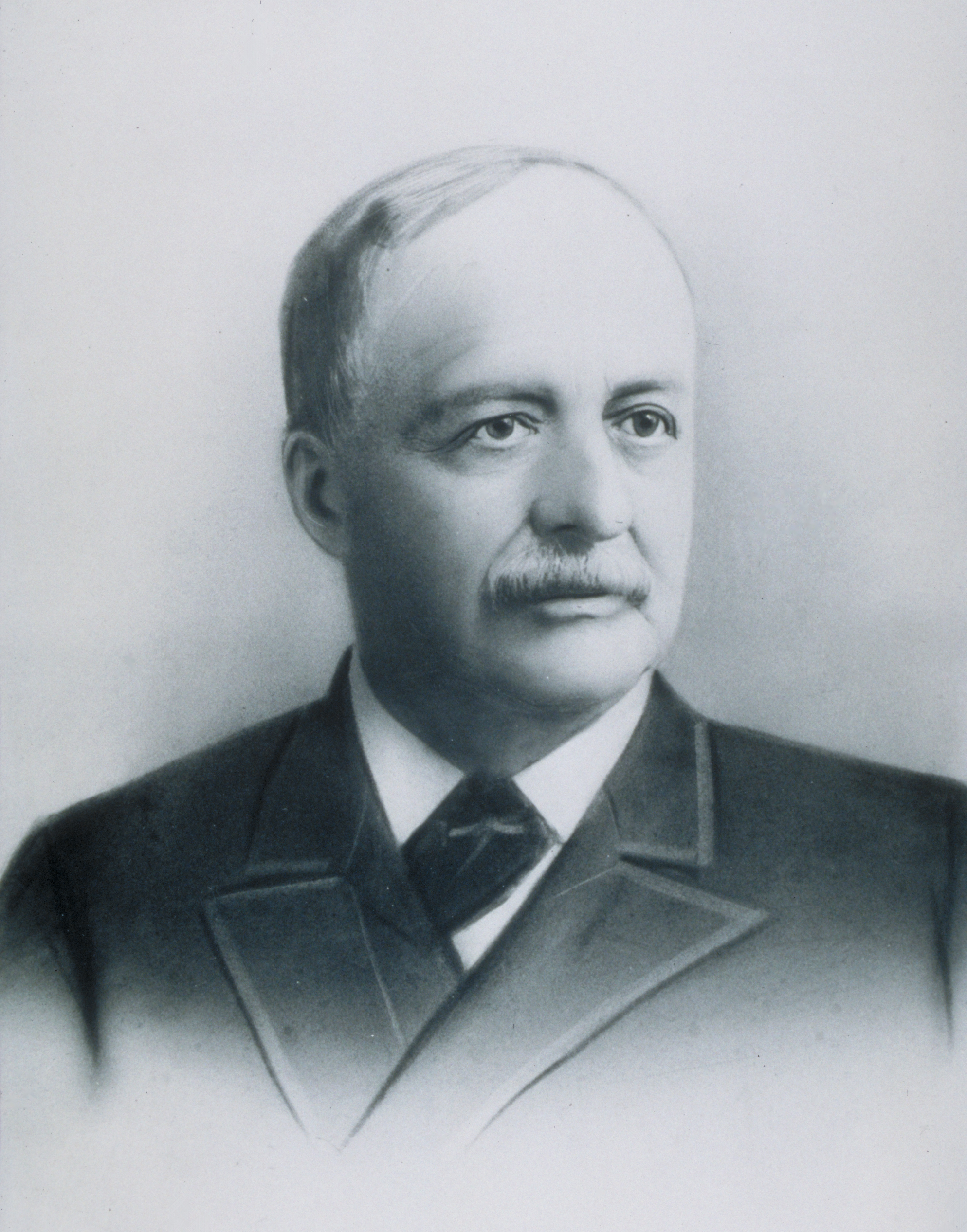
Lewis Ginter was the founder of Allen & Ginter which was at the time the world's largest tobacco company

A decade after the Civil War, Richmond resumed its position as a major urban center of economic productivity with iron front buildings and massive brick factories. Canal traffic peaked in the 1860s, with railroads becoming the dominant shipping method. Richmond became a major railroad crossroads, showcasing the world's first triple railroad crossing. Tobacco warehousing and processing continued to play a central economic role, advanced by the world's first cigarette-rolling machine that James Albert Bonsack of Roanoke invented between 1880 and 1881.

Lewis Ginter was the founder of Allen & Ginter which was at the time one of the world's largest tobacco companies. He would devote his philanthropy to Richmond and was quoted saying "I am for Richmond, first and last." He built the Jefferson Hotel and suburbs north of Richmond which would go on to be the model for much of the country.

Richmond had one of the world's first successful electric streetcar systems. An important contributor to Richmond's resurgence was the Richmond Union Passenger Railway, a trolley system developed by electric power pioneer Frank J. Sprague. The system opened its first Richmond line in 1888, using an overhead wire and a trolley pole to connect to the current and electric motors on the car's trucks. The success led to electric streetcar lines rapidly spreading to other cities. A post-World War II transition to buses from streetcars began in May 1947 and was completed on November 25, 1949.

=== 20th century ===
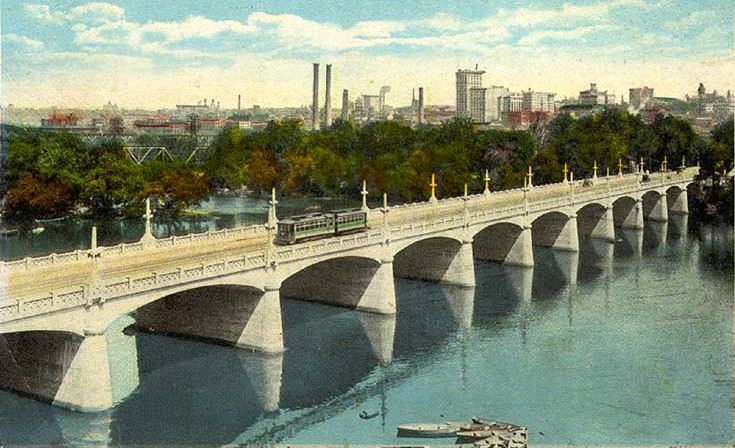
By the early 20th century Richmond had an extensive network of electric streetcars, as shown here crossing the Mayo Bridge over the James River, c. 1917.

By the beginning of the 20th century, the city's population had reached 85,050 in 5 sq mi (13 km^{2}), making it the most densely populated city in the Southern United States. In the 1900 Census, Richmond's population was 62.1% white and 37.9% black. Freed slaves and their descendants created a thriving African-American business community, and the city's historic Jackson Ward became known as the "Wall Street of Black America" and the "Harlem of the South." In 1903, African-American businesswoman and financier Maggie L. Walker chartered St. Luke Penny Savings Bank, served as its president, and was the first black female bank president in the United States.

In 1910, the former city of Manchester consolidated with Richmond, and in 1914 the city annexed Barton Heights, Ginter Park, and Highland Park in Henrico County. In May 1914, Richmond became the headquarters of the Fifth District of the Federal Reserve Bank.

Several major performing arts venues were constructed during the 1920s, including what are now the Landmark Theatre, Byrd Theatre, and Carpenter Theatre. The city's first radio station, WRVA, began broadcasting in 1925. WTVR-TV (CBS 6), Richmond's first television station, was also the first TV station south of Washington, D.C.

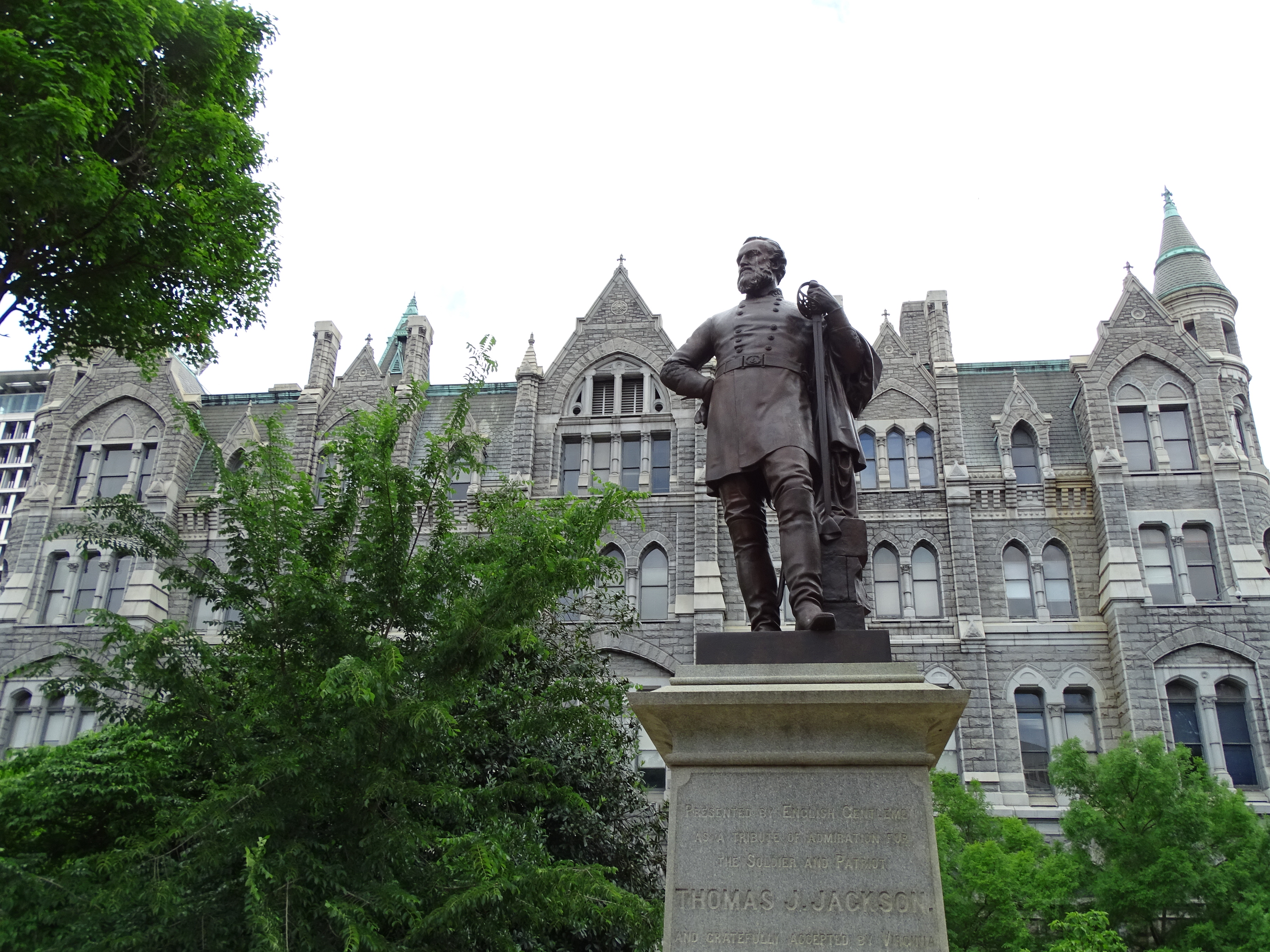
Statue of Stonewall Jackson in front of Richmond's Old City Hall

Between 1963 and 1965, there was a "downtown boom" that led to the construction of more than 700 buildings. In 1968, Virginia Commonwealth University was created by the merger of the Medical College of Virginia and the Richmond Professional Institute.

On January 1, 1970, Richmond's borders expanded south by 27 sq mi (70 km^{2}) and its population increased by 47,000 after several years of court cases in which Chesterfield County unsuccessfully fought annexation.

In 1995, a multimillion-dollar flood wall was completed, protecting the city's low-lying areas from the oft-rising James River. Consequently, the River District businesses grew rapidly, bolstered by the creation of a Canal Walk along the city's former industrial canals. Today the area is home to much of Richmond's entertainment, dining, and nightlife activity.

In 1996, racial tensions grew amid controversy about adding the statue of African-American Richmond native and tennis star Arthur Ashe to the series of statues of Confederate figures on Monument Avenue. After several months of controversy, Ashe's bronze statue was finally completed on July 10, 1996.

=== 21st century ===
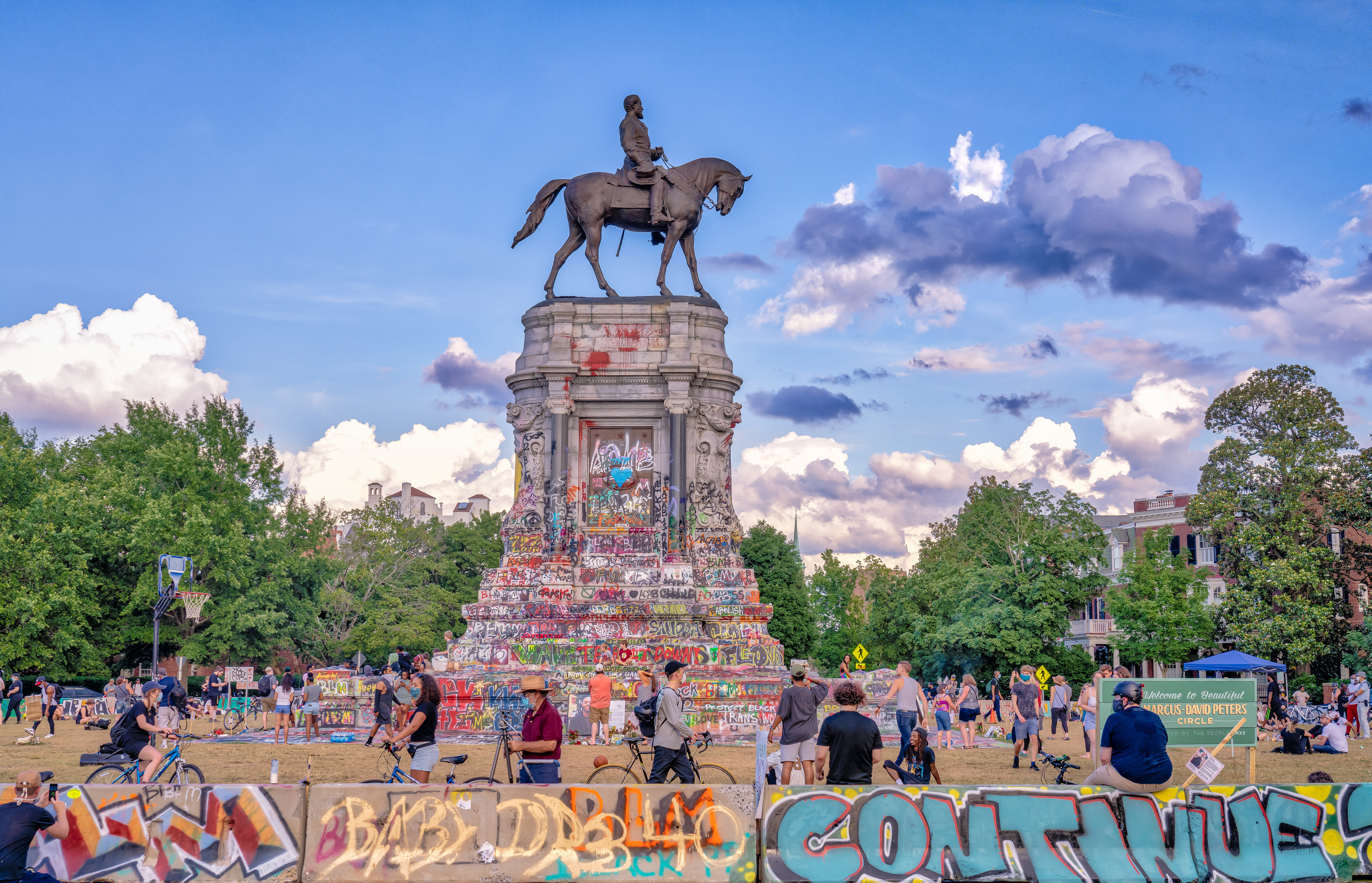
A formerly-focal point of Monument Avenue, the Robert E. Lee Monument was removed in 2021, following the protests against Confederate monuments in Virginia.

By the beginning of the 21st century, the population of the greater Richmond metropolitan area had reached approximately 1,100,000, although the population of the city itself had declined to less than 200,000. On November 2, 2004, former Virginia governor L. Douglas Wilder was elected as the city's first directly elected mayor in over 60 years.

Most of the statues honoring Confederate leaders such as the Robert E. Lee monument on Monument Avenue were removed during or after the George Floyd protests in June 2020 following the murder of George Floyd by Minneapolis police officer Derek Chauvin. The city removed the last Confederate statue, honoring Confederate General General A. P. Hill, on December 12, 2022. The only statue remaining on Monument Avenue is of Arthur Ashe, the pioneering Black tennis player. The Bill "Bojangles" Robinson monument in Jackson Ward was untouched during the protests and remained in place.

== Geography ==
According to the United States Census Bureau, the city has a total area of 62 sq mi (160 km^{2}), of which 60 sq mi (160 km^{2}) is land and 2.7 sq mi (7.0 km^{2}) (4.3%) is water. The city is in the Piedmont region of Virginia, at the James River's highest navigable point. The Piedmont region is characterized by relatively low, rolling hills, and lies between the low, flat Tidewater region and the Blue Ridge Mountains. Significant bodies of water in the region include the James River, the Appomattox River, and the Chickahominy River.

The Richmond area, seen from the Sentinel-2 satellite in mid-August 2022.

Richmond-Petersburg is the 44th largest Metropolitan Statistical Area (MSA) in the United States, and includes the independent cities of Richmond, Colonial Heights, Hopewell, and Petersburg, and the counties of Charles City, Chesterfield, Dinwiddie, Goochland, Hanover, Henrico, New Kent, Powhatan, and Prince George. On July 1, 2009, the Richmond—Petersburg MSA's population was 1,258,251.

=== Cityscape ===
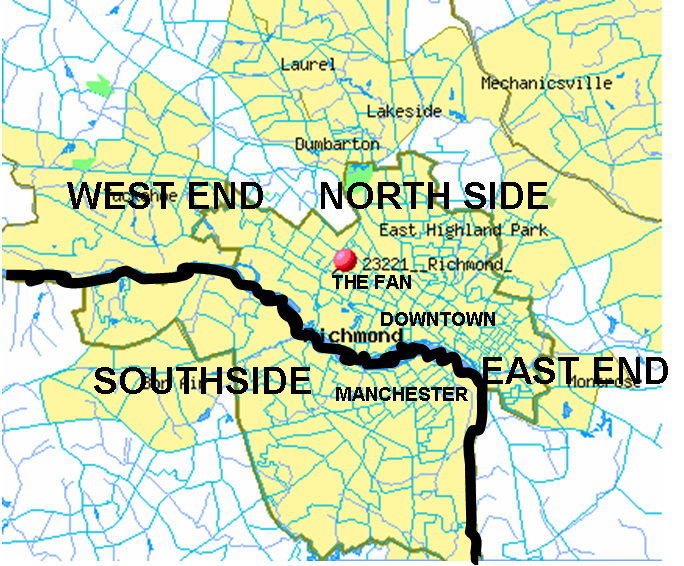
Richmond is often subdivided into the North Side, Southside, East End, and West End.

Richmond's original street grid, laid out in 1737, included the area between what are now Broad, 17th, and 25th Streets and the James River. Modern Downtown Richmond is slightly farther west, on the slopes of Shockoe Hill. Nearby neighborhoods include Shockoe Bottom, the historically significant and low-lying area between Shockoe Hill and Church Hill, and Monroe Ward, which contains the Jefferson Hotel. Richmond's East End includes neighborhoods like the rapidly gentrifying Church Hill, home to St. John's Church, poorer areas like Fulton, Union Hill, and Fairmount, and public housing projects like Mosby Court, Whitcomb Court, Fairfield Court, and Creighton Court closer to Interstate 64.

The area between Belvidere Street, Interstate 195, Interstate 95, and the river, which includes Virginia Commonwealth University, is socioeconomically and architecturally diverse. North of Broad Street, the Carver and Newtowne West neighborhoods are demographically similar to neighboring Jackson Ward.Carver has seen some gentrification due to its proximity to VCU. The affluent area between the Boulevard, Main Street, Broad Street, and VCU, known as the Fan, is home to Monument Avenue, an outstanding collection of Victorian architecture, and many students. West of the Boulevard is the Museum District, which contains the Virginia Historical Society and the Virginia Museum of Fine Arts. South of the Downtown Expressway are Byrd Park, Maymont, Hollywood Cemetery, the predominantly black working-class Randolph neighborhood, and white working-class Oregon Hill. Cary Street between Interstate 195 and the Boulevard is a popular commercial area called Carytown.

Richmond's Northside is home to numerous listed historic districts. Neighborhoods such as Chestnut Hill-Plateau and Barton Heights began to be developed at the end of the 19th century when the new streetcar system made it possible for people to live on the city's outskirts and commute downtown. Other prominent Northside neighborhoods include Azalea, Barton Heights, Bellevue, Chamberlayne, Ginter Park, Highland Park, and Rosedale.

Farther west is the suburban West End. Windsor Farms is among its best-known sections. The West End also includes middle- to low-income neighborhoods, such as Laurel, Farmington, and the areas around the Regency Mall. More affluent areas include Glen Allen, Short Pump, and the areas of Tuckahoe away from Regency Mall, all north and northwest of the city. The University of Richmond and the Country Club of Virginia are located on this side of town near the Richmond-Henrico border.

The portion of the city south of the James River is known as the Southside. Southside neighborhoods range from the rapidly gentrifying, condo-laden Old Town Manchester, the area just south of the river across from downtown, to the affluent and middle-class suburban Westover Hills, Forest Hill, Southampton, Stratford Hills, Oxford, Huguenot Hills, Hobby Hill, and Woodland Heights to the impoverished Manchester and Blackwell areas, the Hillside Court housing projects, and the ailing Jefferson Davis Highway commercial corridor. Other Southside neighborhoods include Bellemeade, Fawnbrook, Broad Rock, Cherry Gardens, Cullenwood, and Beaufont Hills. Much of Southside, specifically towards the southwest of southside developed a suburban character as part of Chesterfield County before being annexed by Richmond, most notably in 1970.

=== Climate ===
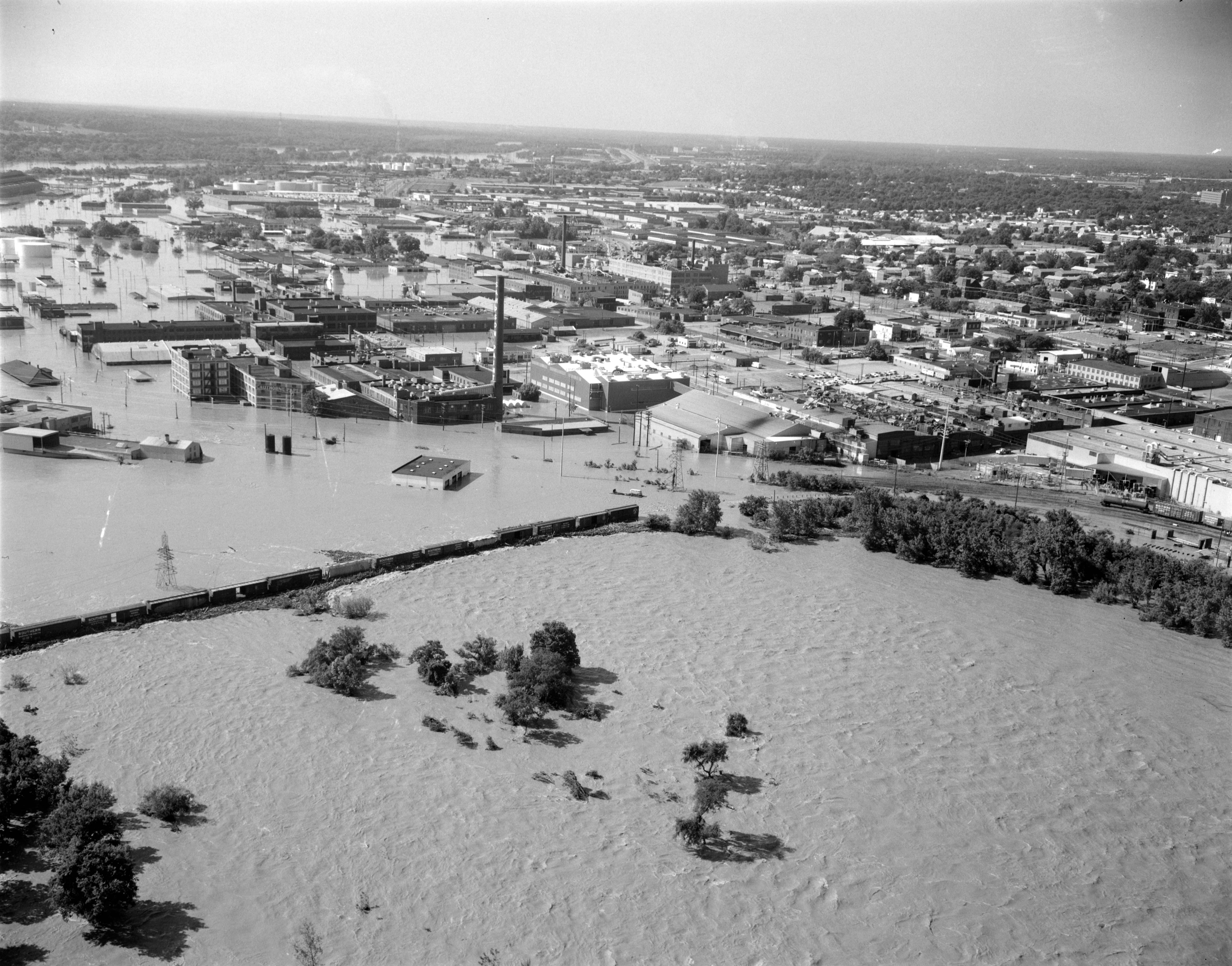
Flooding of Old Manchester during Hurricane Agnes, 1972

Richmond has a humid subtropical (Köppen: Cfa) or oceanic (Trewartha: Doak) climate, with hot, humid summers and moderately cold winters. The mountains to the west act as a partial barrier to outbreaks of cold, continental air in winter. Arctic air is delayed long enough to be modified and further warmed as it subsides in its approach to Richmond. The open waters of the Chesapeake Bay and Atlantic Ocean contribute to the humid summers and cool winters. The coldest weather normally occurs from late December to early February, and the January daily mean temperature is 37.9 °F (3.3 °C), with an average of 6.0 days with highs at or below the freezing mark. Richmond's Downtown and areas south and east of downtown are in USDA Hardiness zones 7b. Surrounding suburbs and areas to the north and west of Downtown are in Hardiness Zone 7a. Temperatures seldom fall below 0 °F (−18 °C), with the most recent subzero reading on January 7, 2018, when the temperature reached −3 °F (−19 °C). The July daily mean temperature is 79.3 °F (26.3 °C), and high temperatures reach or exceed 90 °F (32 °C) approximately 43 days a year; 100 °F (38 °C) temperatures are not uncommon but do not occur every year. Extremes in temperature have ranged from −12 °F (−24 °C) on January 19, 1940, to 107 °F (42 °C) on August 6, 1918. (Note: Annual records from the airport weather station that date back to 1948 are available on the web.) The record cold maximum is 11 °F (−12 °C), set on February 11 and 12, 1899. The record warm minimum is 81 °F (27 °C), set on July 12, 2011. The warmest months recorded were July 2020 and August 1900, both averaging 82.9 °F (28.3 °C). The coldest, January 1940, averaged 24.2 °F (-4.3 °C).

Climate chart for Richmond

Precipitation is rather uniformly distributed throughout the year. Dry periods lasting several weeks sometimes occur, especially in autumn, when long periods of pleasant, mild weather are most common. There is considerable variability in total monthly precipitation amounts from year to year. Snow has been recorded during seven of the 12 months. Falls of 4 in (10 cm) or more within 24 hours occur once a year on average. Annual snowfall is usually moderate, averaging 10.5 in (27 cm) per season. Snow typically remains on the ground for only one or two days, but it remained for 16 days in 2010 (January 30 to February 14), and 17 days in 2026 (January 25 to February 10). Ice storms (freezing rain or glaze) are not uncommon, but they are seldom severe enough to cause considerable damage.

The James River reaches tidewater at Richmond, where flooding may occur in any month of the year, most frequently in March and least in July. Hurricanes and tropical storms have been responsible for most flooding during the summer and early fall months. Hurricanes passing near Richmond have produced record rainfalls. In 1955, three hurricanes, including Hurricane Connie and Hurricane Diane, which brought heavy rains five days apart, produced record rainfall in a six-week period. In 2004, the downtown area suffered extensive flood damage after the remnants of Hurricane Gaston dumped up to 12 in (300 mm) of rain.

Damaging storms occur mainly from snow and freezing rain in winter, and from hurricanes, tornadoes, and severe thunderstorms in other seasons. Damage can come from wind, flooding, rain, or a combination of the three. Tornadoes are infrequent, but some notable ones have been observed in the Richmond area.

Downtown Richmond averages 84 days of nighttime frost annually. Nighttime frost is more common in areas north and west of Downtown and less common south and east of downtown. From 1981 to 2010, the average first temperature at or below freezing was on October 30 and the average last one on April 10.

Climate data for Richmond International Airport, Virginia (1991–2020 normals, (Note: Mean monthly maxima and minima (i.e. the expected highest and lowest temperature readings at any point during the year or given month) calculated based on data at said location from 1991 to 2020.) extremes 1887–present (Note: Official records for Richmond kept January 1887 to December 1910 at downtown, Chimborazo Park from January 1911 to December 1929, and at Richmond Int'l since January 1930. For more information, see Threadex))
Month	Jan	Feb	Mar	Apr	May	Jun	Jul	Aug	Sep	Oct	Nov	Dec	Year
Record high °F (°C)	81 (27)	83 (28)	94 (34)	96 (36)	100 (38)	104 (40)	105 (41)	107 (42)	103 (39)	99 (37)	86 (30)	81 (27)	107 (42)
Mean maximum °F (°C)	70.1 (21.2)	72.6 (22.6)	80.5 (26.9)	87.7 (30.9)	91.5 (33.1)	96.6 (35.9)	98.6 (37.0)	96.7 (35.9)	92.9 (33.8)	86.4 (30.2)	77.1 (25.1)	71.7 (22.1)	99.6 (37.6)
Mean daily maximum °F (°C)	47.8 (8.8)	51.6 (10.9)	59.6 (15.3)	70.4 (21.3)	77.8 (25.4)	85.6 (29.8)	89.5 (31.9)	87.5 (30.8)	81.2 (27.3)	70.9 (21.6)	60.4 (15.8)	51.5 (10.8)	69.5 (20.8)
Daily mean °F (°C)	38.3 (3.5)	41.0 (5.0)	48.4 (9.1)	58.4 (14.7)	66.7 (19.3)	75.0 (23.9)	79.4 (26.3)	77.5 (25.3)	71.2 (21.8)	60.0 (15.6)	49.6 (9.8)	41.8 (5.4)	58.9 (14.9)
Mean daily minimum °F (°C)	28.8 (−1.8)	30.4 (−0.9)	37.2 (2.9)	46.4 (8.0)	55.7 (13.2)	64.5 (18.1)	69.2 (20.7)	67.6 (19.8)	61.1 (16.2)	49.0 (9.4)	38.8 (3.8)	32.1 (0.1)	48.4 (9.1)
Mean minimum °F (°C)	11.1 (−11.6)	16.0 (−8.9)	21.6 (−5.8)	31.9 (−0.1)	42.1 (5.6)	53.4 (11.9)	60.9 (16.1)	59.3 (15.2)	48.8 (9.3)	34.4 (1.3)	24.3 (−4.3)	18.2 (−7.7)	9.1 (−12.7)
Record low °F (°C)	−12 (−24)	−10 (−23)	10 (−12)	19 (−7)	31 (−1)	40 (4)	51 (11)	46 (8)	35 (2)	21 (−6)	10 (−12)	−2 (−19)	−12 (−24)
Average precipitation inches (mm)	3.23 (82)	2.61 (66)	4.00 (102)	3.18 (81)	4.00 (102)	4.64 (118)	4.37 (111)	4.90 (124)	4.61 (117)	3.39 (86)	3.06 (78)	3.51 (89)	45.50 (1,156)
Average snowfall inches (cm)	3.7 (9.4)	2.2 (5.6)	1.1 (2.8)	0.0 (0.0)	0.0 (0.0)	0.0 (0.0)	0.0 (0.0)	0.0 (0.0)	0.0 (0.0)	0.0 (0.0)	0.0 (0.0)	1.8 (4.6)	8.8 (22)
Average precipitation days (≥ 0.01 in)	10.0	9.0	10.8	10.5	11.1	10.6	11.4	9.4	9.3	8.1	8.4	10.0	118.6
Average snowy days (≥ 0.1 in)	1.9	1.7	1.0	0.6	0.0	0.0	0.0	0.0	0.0	0.0	0.1	0.9	5.6
Average relative humidity (%)	67.9	65.6	63.0	60.8	69.5	72.2	74.8	77.2	77.0	73.8	69.1	68.9	70.0
Average dew point °F (°C)	24.8 (−4.0)	26.4 (−3.1)	33.6 (0.9)	41.5 (5.3)	54.1 (12.3)	63.0 (17.2)	67.6 (19.8)	67.3 (19.6)	60.6 (15.9)	48.4 (9.1)	38.1 (3.4)	29.5 (−1.4)	46.2 (7.9)
Mean monthly sunshine hours	172.5	179.7	233.3	261.6	288.0	306.4	301.4	278.9	237.9	222.8	183.5	163.0	2,829
Percentage possible sunshine	56	59	63	66	65	69	67	66	64	64	60	55	64
Average ultraviolet index	2	3	5	7	8	9	9	9	7	5	3	2	6
Source 1: NOAA (relative humidity and sunshine hours 1961–1990)
Source 2: Weather Atlas

== Demographics ==
Historical population
Census	Pop.	Note	%±
1790	3,761		—
1800	5,737		52.5%
1810	9,735		69.7%
1820	12,067		24.0%
1830	16,060		33.1%
1840	20,153		25.5%
1850	27,570		36.8%
1860	37,910		37.5%
1870	51,038		34.6%
1880	63,600		24.6%
1890	81,388		28.0%
1900	85,050		4.5%
1910	127,628		50.1%
1920	171,667		34.5%
1930	182,929		6.6%
1940	193,042		5.5%
1950	230,310		19.3%
1960	219,958		−4.5%
1970	249,621		13.5%
1980	219,214		−12.2%
1990	203,056		−7.4%
2000	197,790		−2.6%
2010	204,214		3.2%
2020	226,610		11.0%
2025 (est.)	237,257	▲	4.7%
U.S. Decennial Census; 1790–1960 1900–1990; 1990–2000; 2010–2020

Richmond's population is approximately 226,000. As an independent city, Richmond is surrounded by Henrico County, which has a population of about 334,000. The Greater Richmond region has an estimated population of about 1.3 million.

=== Racial and ethnic composition ===
Richmond city, Virginia – Racial and ethnic composition Note: the US Census treats Hispanic/Latino as an ethnic category. This table excludes Latinos from the racial categories and assigns them to a separate category. Hispanics/Latinos may be of any race.
Race / Ethnicity (NH = Non-Hispanic)	Pop 1980	Pop 1990	Pop 2000	Pop 2010	Pop 2020	% 1980	% 1990	% 2000	% 2010	% 2020
White alone (NH)	103,904	87,222	74,506	79,813	95,220	47.40%	42.95%	37.67%	39.08%	42.02%
Black or African American alone (NH)	111,243	111,644	112,455	102,264	90,490	50.75%	54.98%	56.86%	50.08%	39.93%
Native American or Alaska Native alone (NH)	357	441	460	514	440	0.16%	0.22%	0.23%	0.25%	0.19%
Asian alone (NH)	976	1,741	2,437	4,679	6,199	0.45%	0.86%	1.23%	2.29%	2.74%
Native Hawaiian or Pacific Islander alone (NH)	x	x	66	93	69	x	x	0.03%	0.05%	0.03%
Other race alone (NH)	524	110	319	367	1,378	0.24%	0.05%	0.16%	0.18%	0.61%
Mixed race or Multiracial (NH)	x	x	2,473	3,681	9,067	x	x	1.25%	1.80%	4.00%
Hispanic or Latino (any race)	2,210	1,898	5,074	12,803	23,747	1.01%	0.93%	2.57%	6.27%	10.48%
Total	219,214	203,056	197,790	204,214	226,610	100.00%	100.00%	100.00%	100.00%	100.00%

Ancestry in Richmond, VA (2014–2018)
Origin	percent
African American (Does not include West Indian or African)	45.2%
English American (Includes "American" ancestry)	12.1%
Scottish or Irish American (Includes Scots-Irish)	9.9%
German American	7.4%
Central American (Includes Honduran, Salvadoran, Costa Rican, etc.)	3.2%
Mexican American	1.8%
Other	20.4%

=== 2020 census ===
As of the 2020 census, Richmond had a population of 226,610. The median age was 32.4 years. 17.1% of residents were under the age of 18 and 13.2% of residents were 65 years of age or older. For every 100 females there were 90.5 males, and for every 100 females age 18 and over there were 87.9 males age 18 and over.

100.0% of residents lived in urban areas, while 0.0% lived in rural areas.

There were 102,359 households in Richmond, of which 20.7% had children under the age of 18 living in them. Of all households, 23.9% were married-couple households, 26.4% were households with a male householder and no spouse or partner present, and 40.0% were households with a female householder and no spouse or partner present. About 40.2% of all households were made up of individuals and 10.5% had someone living alone who was 65 years of age or older.

There were 111,963 housing units, of which 8.6% were vacant. The homeowner vacancy rate was 2.0% and the rental vacancy rate was 6.8%.

=== Crime ===
Richmond experienced a spike in overall crime, particularly in the murder rate, during the 1980s, 1990s, and the early 2000s, when it was consistently ranked as one of the most dangerous cities in the United States.

Since the late 2000s, various forms of crime have significantly decreased in the city. Its major crime rate, including violent and property crimes, decreased 47 percent between 2004 and 2009 to its lowest level in more than a quarter of a century. In 2008, Richmond had fallen to 49th on a Morgan Quitno Press ranking of the most dangerous cities in the United States, and the city recorded its lowest homicide rate since 1971. By 2012, Richmond was no longer in the top 200.

In recent years, Richmond, like other cities, has had a slight increase in homicides, although violent and other forms of crime remain below the national average.

=== Religion ===
In 1786, the Virginia General Assembly adopted the Virginia Statute for Religious Freedom, which Thomas Jefferson wrote in 1779. The First Freedom Center now commemorates the site.

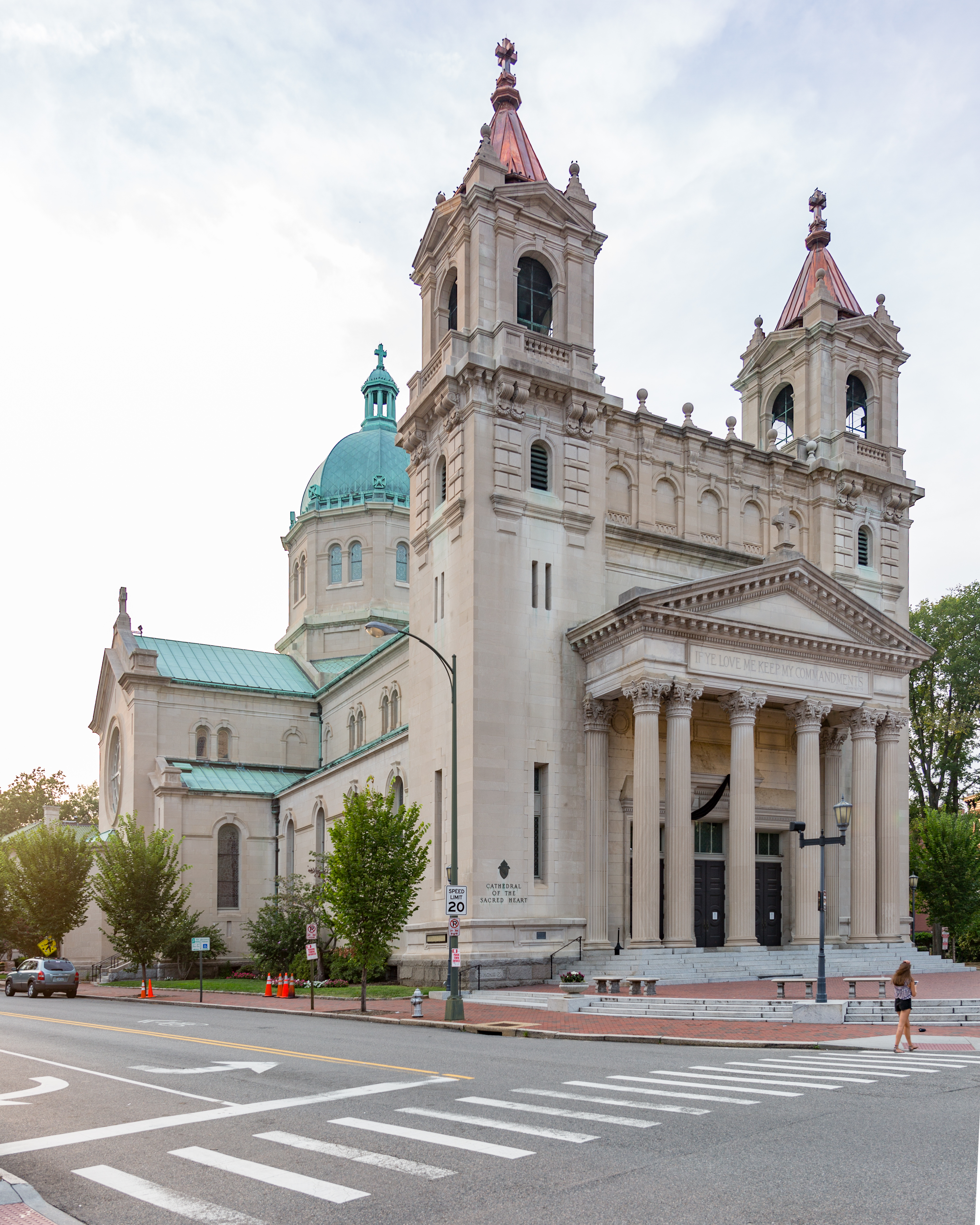
Cathedral of the Sacred Heart, dedicated in 1906

Richmond has several historic churches, including several prominent Anglican/Episcopal ones from before the Revolutionary War, Monumental Church, St. Paul's Episcopal Church, and St. John's Episcopal Church. Methodists and Baptists built subsequent early Richmond churches. The first, First Baptist Church of Richmond, was established in 1780. The First Presbyterian Church, organized on June 18, 1812, was the city's first Reformed church. The Second Presbyterian Church of Richmond, founded February 5, 1845, where Stonewall Jackson worshiped, was Richmond's first Gothic building and gas-lit church. St. Peter's Church, dedicated May 25, 1834, was the first Catholic church. The Cathedral of the Sacred Heart, dedicated 72 years later, is the Roman Catholic Diocese of Richmond's mother church.

The first Jewish congregation in Richmond, and the sixth in the United States, was Kahal Kadosh Beth Shalom. By 1822, Beth Shalom members worshipped in Virginia's first synagogue. Eventually, the congregation merged with its offshoot, Congregation Beth Ahabah. Richmond has two Orthodox Synagogues, Keneseth Beth Israel and Chabad of Virginia. An Orthodox Yeshivah K–12 school system, Rudlin Torah Academy, includes a post high-school program. The city also is home to two Conservative synagogues, Beth El and Or Atid; and two Reform synagogues, Beth Ahabah and Or Ami. Other Jewish charitable, educational, and social service institutions serving Richmond include the Weinstein Jewish Community Center, Jewish Family Services, Jewish Community Federation of Richmond, and the Richmond Jewish Foundation.

Immigrants brought their religions to Richmond and built churches. Germans formed St. John's German Evangelical church in 1843. Greeks held Saints Constantine and Helen Greek Orthodox Cathedral's first worship service in 1917 in a rented room at 309 North 7th Street. The cathedral relocated to 30 Malvern Avenue in 1960. It is one of two Eastern Orthodox churches in Richmond and home to the annual Richmond Greek Festival.

There are seven mosques in the Greater Richmond area, with three more in construction to accommodate the Muslim population. The first was Masjid Bilal. Followed by the Islamic Center of Virginia, ICVA, established in 1973 as a non-profit, tax-exempt organization. The other five masjids in the Richmond area are Islamic Center of Richmond (ICR) in the West End; Masjid Umm Barakah on 2nd Street, Downtown; Islamic Society of Greater Richmond (ISGR) in the West End end; Masjidullah in the north side; and Masjid Ar-Rahman in the East End.

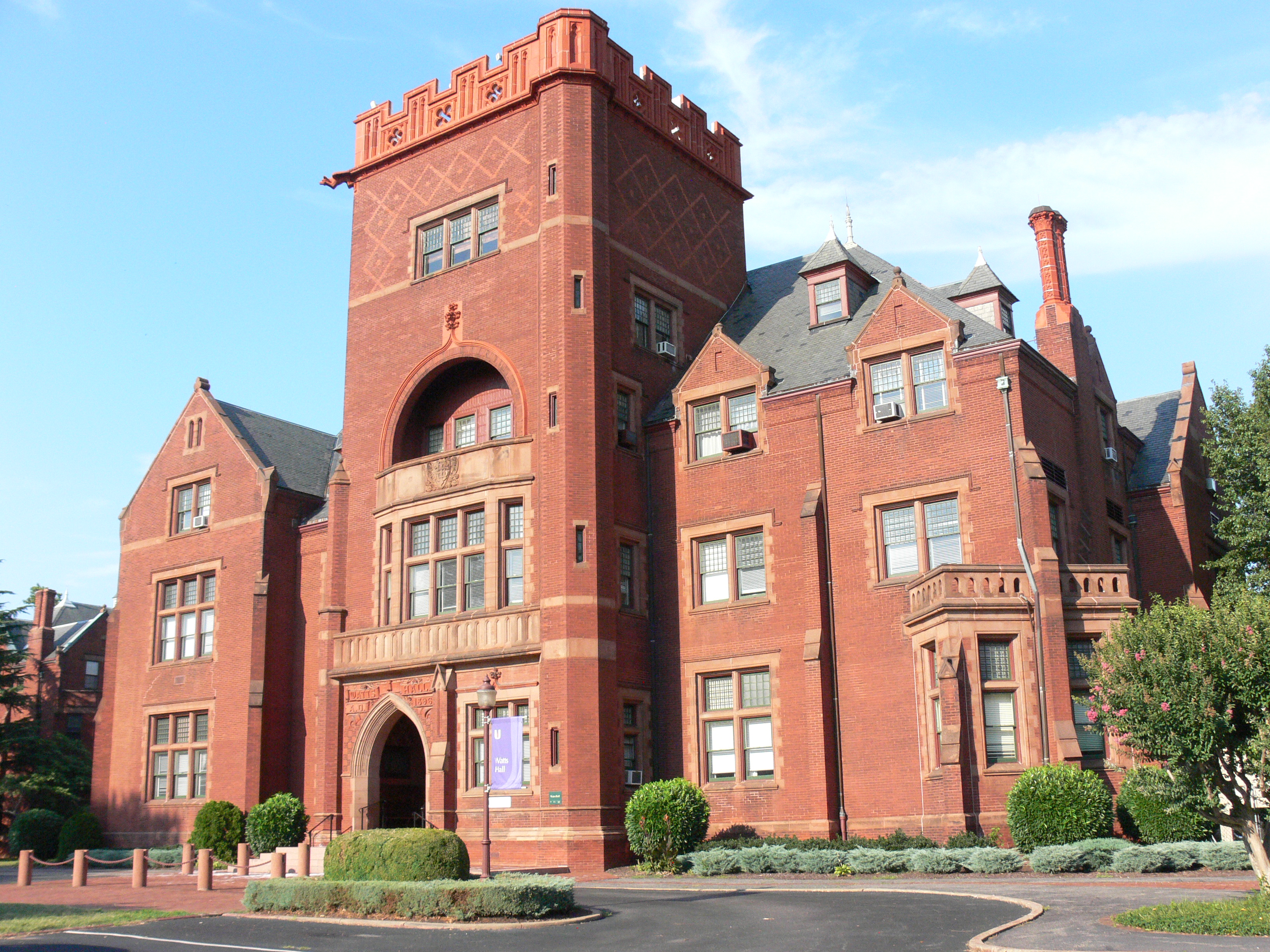
Watts Hall at Union Presbyterian Seminary

Seminaries in Richmond include Virginia Union University's school of theology, Union Presbyterian Seminary, and the Baptist Theological Seminary at Richmond. The McCollough Theological Seminary of the United House of Prayer For All People is in the Church Hill neighborhood.

Bishops sitting in Richmond include those of the Episcopal Diocese of Virginia, the denomination's largest; the Richmond Area of the United Methodist Church (Virginia Annual Conference), the second largest and one of the oldest in the nation. The Presbytery of the James—Presbyterian Church (USA) – also is in the Richmond area.

The Roman Catholic Diocese of Richmond was canonically erected by Pope Pius VII on July 11, 1820, and today has 235,816 members in 146 parishes. The city of Richmond is Cathedral of the Sacred Heart is home to the current bishop, Most Reverend Barry C. Knestout, appointed by Pope Francis on December 15, 2017.

The Church of Jesus Christ of Latter-day Saints has three stakes, or organizational units of multiple congregations, in the greater Richmond area. At year-end 2017, The Church of Jesus Christ of Latter-day Saints reported 95,379 members in 200 congregations in 22 stakes across Virginia). In April 2018, church president Russell M. Nelson announced a new temple to be built in Virginia. The church's first temple in the state is in Glen Allen, northwest of Richmond.

== Economy ==
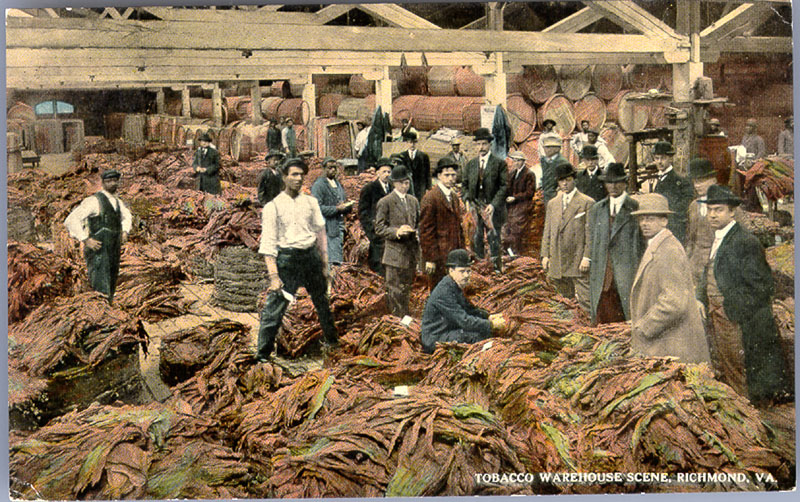
Richmond tobacco warehouse c. 1910s

Richmond's strategic location on the James River at the rocky fall line separating Virginia's Piedmont and Tidewater regions made it a natural development point for commerce. For centuries and three modes of transportation—boats, with the Great Turning Basin; railroad, with one of only two rail line triple crossings in North America; and cars, with two intersecting major interstates—the downtown has always been a natural hub.

Law and finance have long been driving forces in the economy. Richmond is home to the Virginia Supreme Court; one of the four courts in the United States District Court for the Eastern District of Virginia; one of the four divisions of the United States Bankruptcy Court for the Eastern District of Virginia; and the United States Court of Appeals for the Fourth Circuit, one of thirteen such appeals courts. Richmond is headquarters to some large law firms: Hunton Andrews Kurth, McGuireWoods, and Williams Mullen. Troutman Sanders, which merged with Richmond-based Mays & Valentine LLP in 2001, also has a significant presence.

The city also is home to the Federal Reserve Bank of Richmond, one of twelve such banks, with many large financial and other companies having significant offices, like Genworth Financial, Capital One, Philip Morris USA, and several banks and brokerages.

Since the 1960s, Richmond has been a prominent hub for advertising agencies and related businesses. One of the most notable Richmond-based agencies, The Martin Agency, was founded in 1965 and employs 500. With local advertising agency support, VCU's graduate advertising school (VCU Brandcenter) has consistently ranked as the best graduate advertising program in the country.

Richmond is home to the rapidly developing Virginia BioTechnology Research Park, which opened in 1995 as a biotechnology and pharmaceutical incubator. Located adjacent to the Medical College of Virginia (MCV) Campus of Virginia Commonwealth University, the park has over 575,000 ft^{2} (53,400 m^{2}) of research, laboratory, and office space for a diverse tenant mix of companies, research institutes, government laboratories, and non-profit organizations. The United Network for Organ Sharing, which maintains the nation's organ transplant waiting list, occupies one building in the park. Philip Morris USA opened a $350 million research and development facility in the park in 2007. Once fully developed, park officials expect the site to employ roughly 3,000 scientists, technicians and engineers.

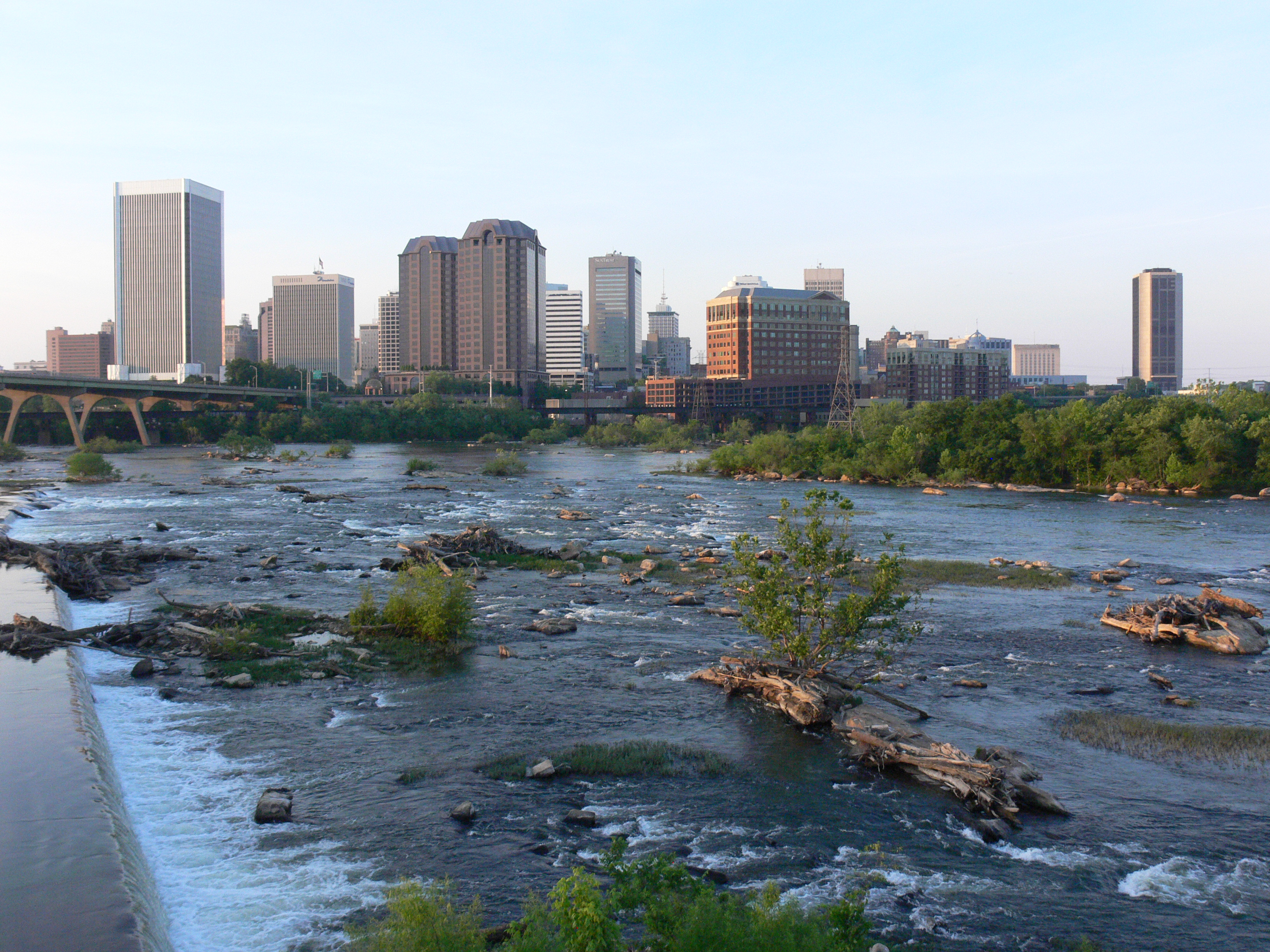
The James River

Richmond's revitalized downtown includes the Canal Walk, a new Greater Richmond Convention Center, and expansion on both VCU campuses. A new performing arts center, Richmond CenterStage, opened on September 12, 2009. The complex included a renovation of the Carpenter Center and construction of a new multipurpose hall, community playhouse, and arts education center in parts of the old Thalhimers department store.

Craft beer, cider, and liquor production is also growing in the River City, with twelve micro-breweries in the city. The oldest is Legend Brewery, founded in 1994. Two cideries, Buskey Cider and Blue Bee Cider, are located in the popular beverage neighborhood of Scott's Addition, which has nine breweries, one meadery, and one distillery. Richmond's three distilleries are Reservoir Distillery, founded in 2010; Belle Isle Craft Spirits, started in 2013; and James River Distillery, established in 2014.

Richmond is attracting film and television industry attention. Several high-profile films have been shot in the metro region, including the major 2012 motion picture Lincoln, for which Daniel Day-Lewis won his third Oscar; Killing Kennedy with Rob Lowe, 2013, airing on the National Geographic Channel; and Turn, starring Jamie Bell and airing on AMC. Richmond was the main filming location for the PBS drama series Mercy Street, which premiered in Winter 2016. Several organizations, including the Virginia Film Office and the Virginia Production Alliance, and events, like the Richmond International Film Festival and French Film Festival, continue to draw film and media professionals to the region.

=== Corporations ===
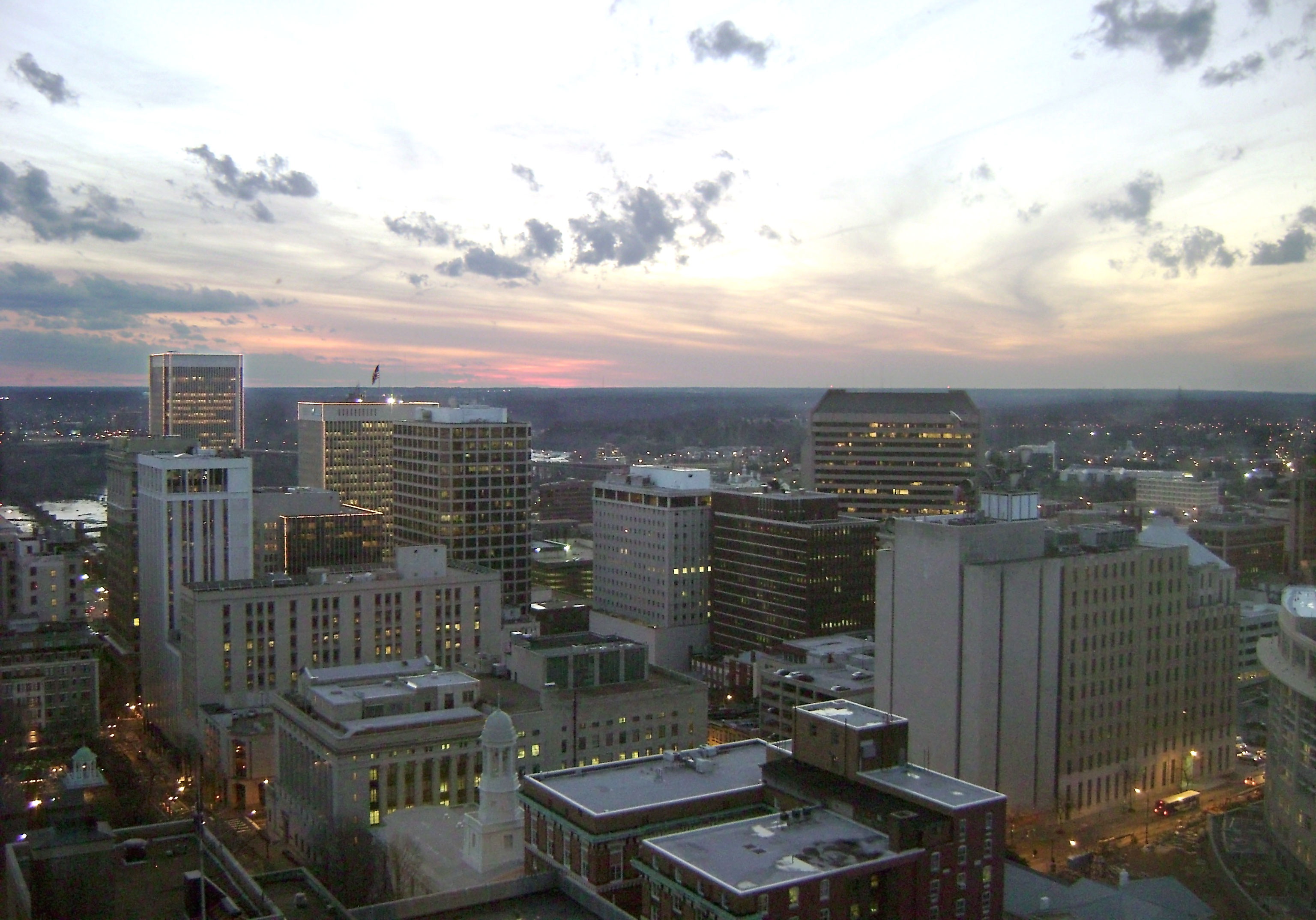
Six Fortune 500 companies are headquartered in the Richmond area.

Greater Richmond was named the third-best city for business by MarketWatch in September 2007, ranking behind Minneapolis and Denver and above Boston. The area is home to six Fortune 500 companies: electric utility Dominion Energy; CarMax; Owens & Minor; Genworth Financial; MeadWestvaco/ WestRock; and Altria Group. Dominion Energy is the only headquartered in the city of Richmond. The others are located in neighboring Henrico and Hanover counties. In February 2006, MeadWestvaco announced a 2008 move from Stamford, Connecticut, to Richmond with assistance from the Greater Richmond Partnership, a regional economic development organization that also helped locate Aditya Birla Minacs, Amazon.com, and Honeywell International to the region. In 2008, Altria moved its corporate HQ from New York City to Henrico County. In July 2015, MeadWestvaco merged with Georgia-based Rock-Tenn Company creating WestRock Company.

Other Fortune 500 companies without headquarters but with a significant presence in the Richmond area include SunTrust Banks (based in Atlanta), Capital One (officially based in McLean, Virginia, but founded in and with its operations center and most employees in the Richmond area), and medical and pharmaceutical giant McKesson Corporation (based in Las Colinas, Texas). Thermo Fisher Scientific came to the Richmond area in December 2021 when it acquired the contract research organization PPD. Capital One and Philip Morris USA are two of the largest private Richmond-area employers. DuPont maintains a production facility in South Richmond known as the Spruance Plant. UPS Freight, the less-than-truckload division of United Parcel Service has its corporate headquarters in Richmond.

Other companies based in Richmond include engineering specialists CTI Consultants; chemical company NewMarket; Brink's, the security and armored car company; Estes Express Lines, a freight carrier; Universal Corporation, a tobacco merchant; Cavalier Telephone, now Windstream, a telephone, internet, and digital television provider formed in Richmond in 1998; Cherry Bekaert & Holland, a top 30 accounting firm serving the Southeast; the law firm of McGuireWoods; Elephant Insurance, an insurance company subsidiary of Admiral Group; and Media General, a company specializing in broadcast media.

=== Poverty ===
As of 2016, 24.8% of Richmond residents live below the federal poverty line, the second-highest among the 30 largest cities and counties in Virginia. An Annie E. Casey Foundation report issued in 2016 also determined that Richmond had a child poverty rate of 39%, more than double Virginia's overall rate. As of 2016, Richmond had the second-highest rate of eviction filings and judgments of any American city with a population of 100,000 or more (in states where complete data was available). Some Richmond neighborhoods, such as the Creighton Court public-housing complex, have high concentrations of poverty.

== Arts and culture ==
=== Museums and monuments ===
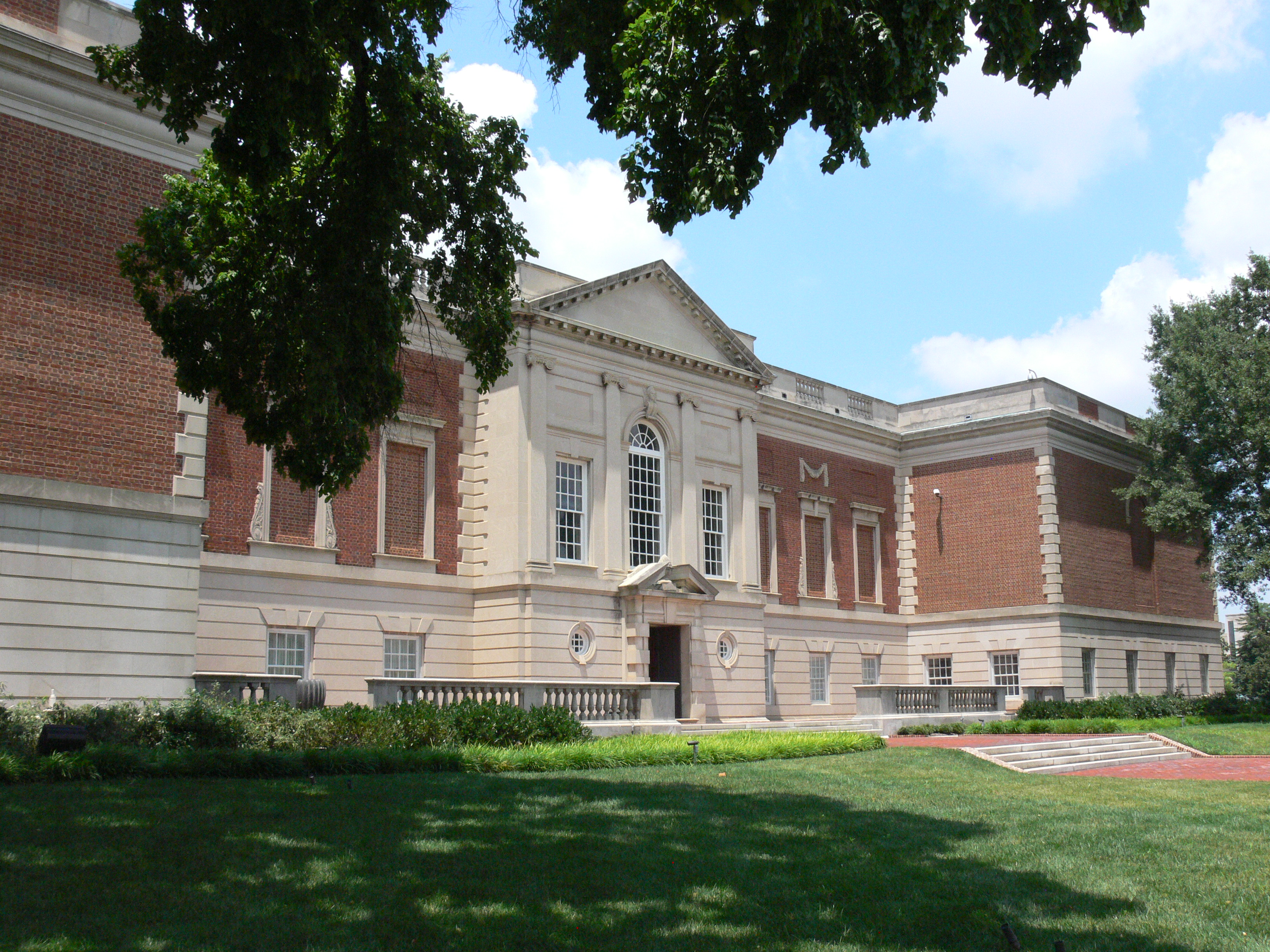
The original 1936 entrance to the Virginia Museum of Fine Arts in the Museum District

Several of the city's large general museums are located on or near Arthur Ashe Boulevard, in what is referred to as the Museum District. The Virginia Historical Society and the Virginia Museum of Fine Arts are on the Boulevard. Nearby is the Science Museum of Virginia, housed on Broad Street in the neoclassical former 1919 Broad Street Union Station. Immediately adjacent is the Children's Museum of Richmond, and two blocks away is the Virginia Center for Architecture. Downtown has the Library of Virginia and the Valentine Richmond History Center. The city also has the Virginia Holocaust Museum and the Old Dominion Railway Museum.

Richmond is home to several American Civil War museums and battlefields. The Richmond National Battlefield Park Visitors Center and the American Civil War Center at Historic Tredegar are near the riverfront, both housed in the former buildings of the Tredegar Iron Works, where much of the South's war ordnance was produced. In Court End, near the Virginia State Capitol, is the Museum of the Confederacy and the Davis Mansion, also known as the Confederacy's White House. Both feature a wide variety of objects and material from the era. The temporary home of General Robert E. Lee still stands Downtown on Franklin Street.

The history of slavery and emancipation are increasingly being represented in the city. There is a former slave trail along the river that leads to Ancarrow's Boat Ramp and Historic Site, which has been developed with interpretive signage. In 2007, the Reconciliation Statue was placed in Shockoe Bottom, with corresponding statues installed in Liverpool and Benin representing points in the Triangle Trade.

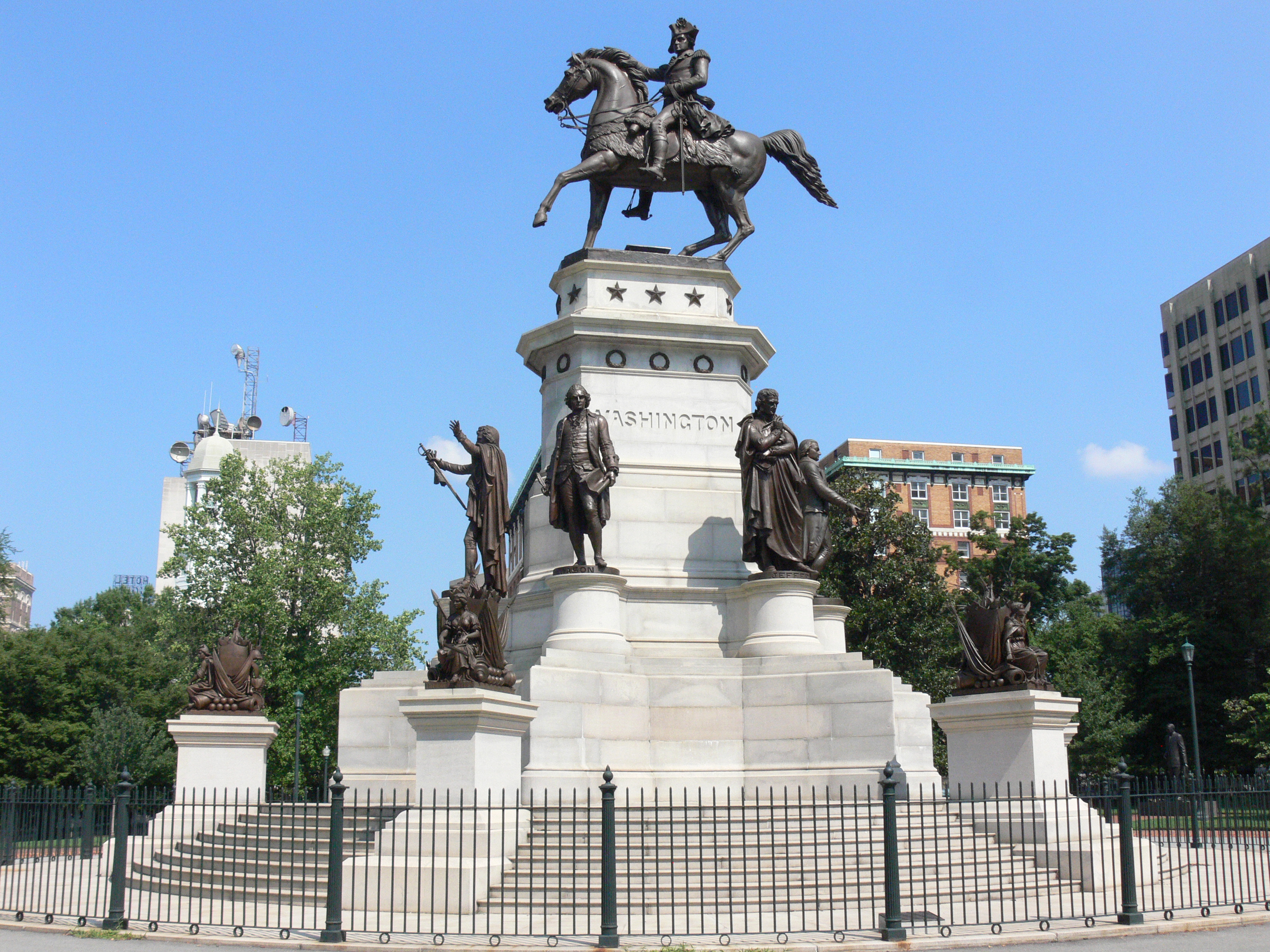
The Virginia Washington Monument features a Sculpture of George Washington on horseback along with six other notable Virginians depicted below, who all took part in the American Revolution

Other historical points of interest include St. John's Church, the site of Patrick Henry's famous "Give me liberty or give me death!" speech, and the Edgar Allan Poe Museum features many of his writings and other artifacts of his life, particularly when he lived in the city as a child, student, and successful writer. The John Marshall House, home of the former Chief Justice of the United States, is also Downtown and features many of his writings and objects from his life. Hollywood Cemetery is where two U.S. Presidents and many Civil War officers and soldiers are buried. Beth Ahabah Museum and Archives collects, preserves, and exhibits materials that focus on Jewish history and culture specifically connected to Richmond.

The Virginia Washington monument was designed by Thomas Crawford and completed under the supervision of Randolph Rogers after Crawford's death. It became the second equestrian statue of George Washington to be unveiled in the United States (following the one in Union Square, New York City, unveiled in 1856). It was not completed until 1869. Located also near Byrd Park is the famous World War I Memorial Carillon, a 56-bell carillon tower. Dedicated in 1956, the Virginia War Memorial is located on Belvedere overlooking the river and is a monument to Virginians who died in battle in World War II, the Korean War, the Vietnam War, the Gulf War, the War in Afghanistan, and the Iraq War.

Agecroft Hall is a Tudor manor house and estate located on the James River in the Windsor Farms neighborhood of Richmond. The manor house was built in the late 15th century and was originally located in the Agecroft area of Pendlebury, in the historic county of Lancashire in England.

=== Visual and performing arts ===
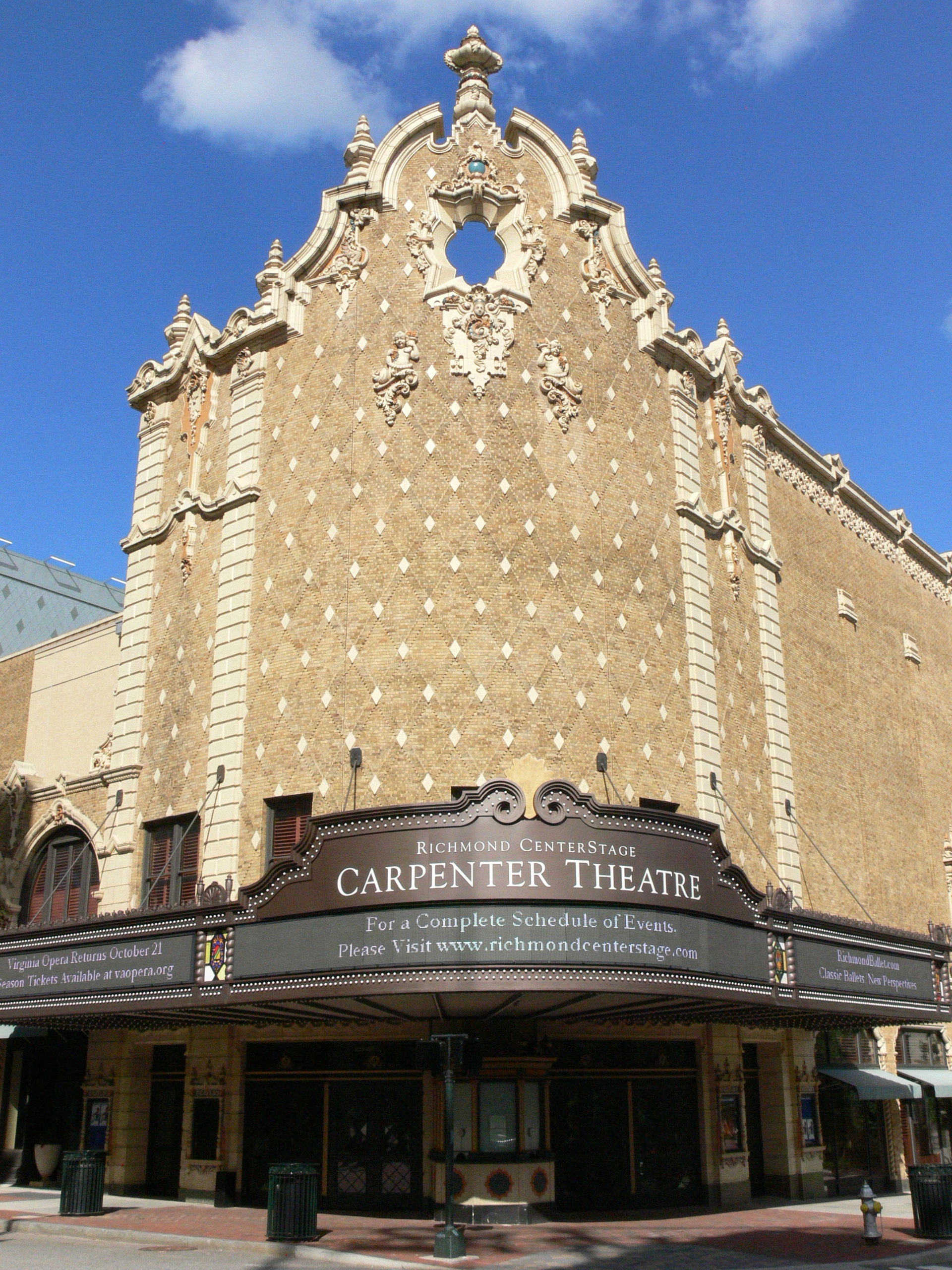
The Carpenter Theatre opened in 1928 and is currently known as Dominion Energy Center

Musicians of note associated with Richmond include Agents of Good Roots, Alabama Thunderpussy, Maggie Antone, Avail, Bad Omens, Black Kray, Chris Brown, Breadwinner, Broadside, Carbon Leaf, Cannabis Corpse, Cracker, D'Angelo, Jimmy Dean, Denali, Down to Nothing, Engine Down, Fighting Gravity. Four Walls Falling, Gwar, Iron Reagan, Labradford, Lamb of God, Lil Ugly Mane, Lucy Dacus, Aimee Mann, Jason Mraz, Municipal Waste, Nettspend, Nickelus F, River City High, Sparklehorse, Strike Anywhere and Eric Stanley.

==== Murals ====
With the Richmond Mural Project (RMP) and 2013's RVA Street Art Festival, the city quickly gained more than 100 murals created by international mural artists, such as Aryz, Roa, Ron English, and Natalia Rak. While the RMP focused on international talent, the RVA Street Art Festival, led by long-time local mural artist Ed Trask, focused mainly on regional artists, although it was responsible for PoseMSK, Jeff Soto, and Mark Jenkins. After some criticism, the RMP included its first local artist, Nils Westergard, who already was on the international circuit, and then another, Jacob Eveland. The two festivals were unrelated, and the RMP is now defunct. The RVA Street Art Festival occurs as funding permits. In response to the George Floyd protests of the summer of 2020, local artist Hamilton Glass spearheaded the Mending Walls Project, featuring walls by pairs of local artists.

==== Professional performing companies ====
From their earliest days, Virginia and Richmond welcomed live theatrical performances. Lewis Hallam staged early Shakespeare productions in Williamsburg, and Richmond became a prominent colonial and early 19th century performance place for celebrated American and English actors, like William Macready, Edwin Forrest, and the Booth family. In the 20th century, Richmond had many amateur troupes and regular touring professional productions. The city's principal performing arts groups include the Virginia Repertory Theatre, Richmond Ballet, Richmond Triangle Players, Richmond Symphony, and Virginia Opera.

Other venues and companies include:

- Altria Theater, the city-owned opera house
- The Byrd Theatre in Carytown, a 1920s movie palace that features second-run movies and hosts the French Film Festival
- Leslie Cheek Theater at the Virginia Museum of Fine Arts
- Dogwood Dell, an amphitheater in Byrd Park
- National Theater
- Dominion Energy Center, which includes the Carpenter Theater
- School of the Performing Arts in the Richmond Community
- Virginia Credit Union Live!
- Allianz Amphitheater at Riverfront

Commercial art galleries include Metro Space Gallery and Gallery 5 in a newly designated arts district. Not-for-profit galleries include Visual Arts Center of Richmond, 1708 Gallery, and Artspace.

In 2008, a new 47,000 sq ft (4,400 m^{2}) Gay Community Center opened on the city's north side. It hosts meetings of many kinds and includes a large art gallery space.

=== Literary arts ===
Richmond has long been a hub for literature and writers. Edgar Allan Poe grew up in the city, and the city's oldest stone house is a museum to his life and works. The Southern Literary Messenger, which included his writing, is one of many notable publications started in Richmond. Other noteworthy authors who have called Richmond home include Pulitzer-winning Ellen Glasgow, controversial figure James Branch Cabell, Meg Medina, Dean King, David L. Robbins, and MacArthur Fellow Paule Marshall. Tom Wolfe was born in Richmond, as was Breaking Bad creator Vince Gilligan. David Baldacci graduated from Virginia Commonwealth University, where the creative writing faculty has included Marshall, Claudia Emerson, Kathleen Graber, T. R. Hummer, Dave Smith, David Wojahn, and Susann Cokal. Notable graduates include Sheri Reynolds, Jon Pineda, Anna Journey and Joshua Poteat.

=== Notable people ===
Charles Thaddeus Russell was Richmond's first black architect, and he designed the bank's office. Today, the bank is called the Consolidated Bank and Trust Company and is the country's oldest surviving African-American bank. Another prominent African-American from this time was John Mitchell Jr., a newspaper editor, civil rights activist, and politician.

=== Architecture ===
The Egyptian Building (1845) on the campus of Virginia Commonwealth University

Richmond is home to many significant structures, including some designed by notable architects. The city contains diverse styles and has excellent examples of Georgian, Federal, Greek Revival, Neoclassical, Egyptian Revival, Romanesque Revival, Gothic Revival, Tudor Revival, Italianate, Queen Anne, Colonial Revival, Art Deco, Modernist, International, and Postmodern architecture.

Many of Richmond's historic properties are documented in books and 1970s-era black and white photographs by John G. Zehmer, an architectural historian and preservationist.

The 1865 Evacuation Fire destroyed about 25% of Richmond's early buildings. Fewer remain due to redevelopment and construction occurring since Reconstruction. Nonetheless, Richmond has many historically significant buildings and districts. From the colonial period, there are the Patteson-Schutte House and the Edgar Allan Poe Museum (Richmond, Virginia), both built before 1750.

Architectural classicism is represented in all city districts, particularly Downtown and in the Fan and the Museum District. Several notable classical architects have designed buildings in Richmond. Thomas Jefferson and Charles-Louis Clérisseau designed the Virginia State Capitol in 1785. It is the second-oldest U.S. statehouse in continuous use (Maryland's is the oldest), and the first U.S. government building built in the neo-classical style, setting the trend for other state houses and federal buildings, including the White House and The Capitol in Washington, D.C. Robert Mills designed Monumental Church on Broad Street, abutted by the 1845 Egyptian Building, one of the few Egyptian Revival buildings in the U.S.

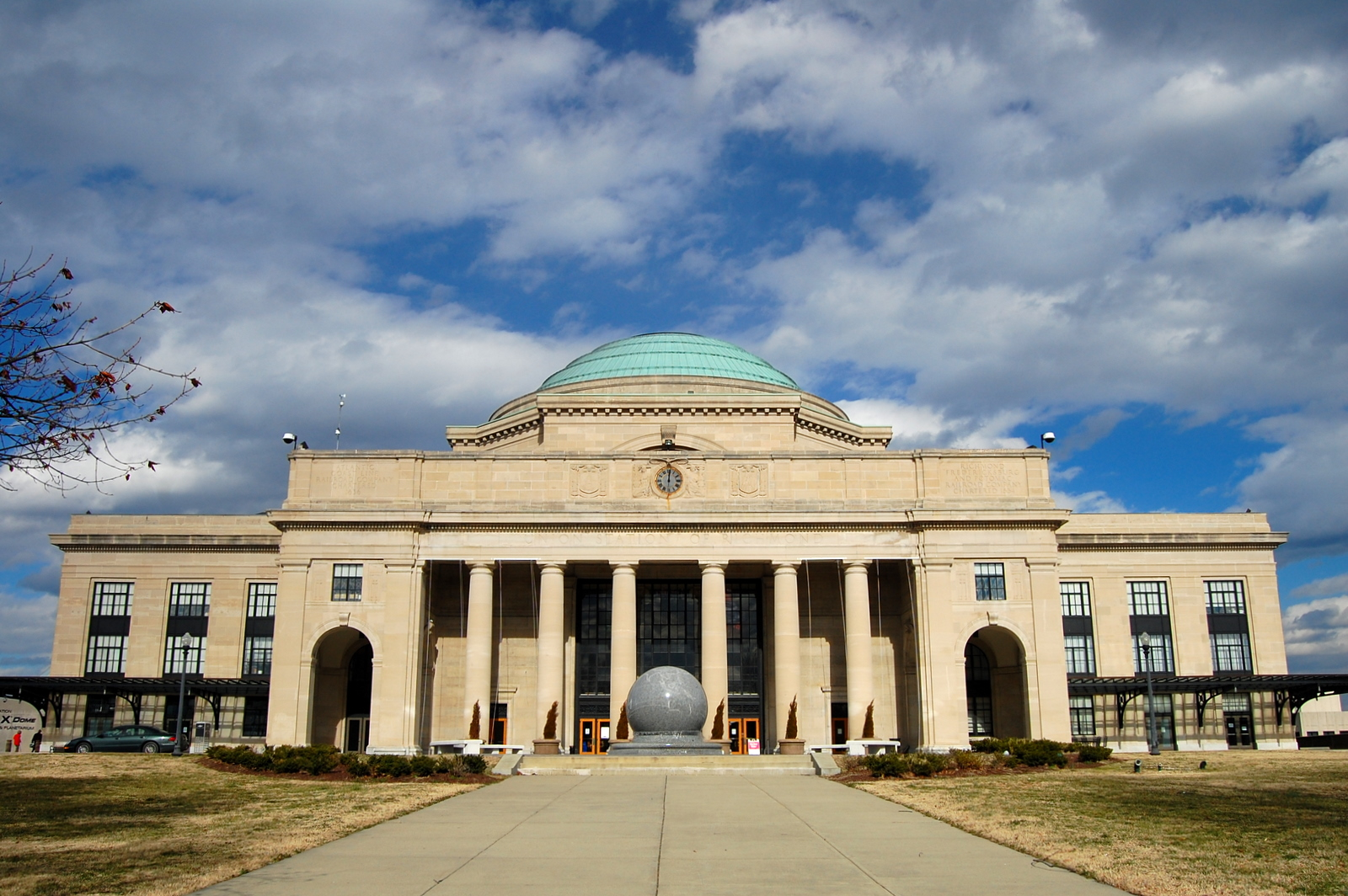
The Science Museum of Virginia is housed in Broad Street Station, designed by John Russell Pope

The firm of John Russell Pope designed Broad Street Station, or Union Station, in the Beaux-Arts style, and it now is home to the Science Museum of Virginia. The firm also designed Branch House on Monument Avenue as a Tudor private residence, which now is the Branch Museum of Architecture and Design. Wilson, Harris, and Richards designed Main Street Station, now used for its intended purpose. The classically trained Beaux-Arts architects, Carrère and Hastings, designed both the Jefferson Hotel and the Commonwealth Club. Ralph Adams Cram, renowned for the Princeton University Chapel and the Cathedral of Saint John the Divine, designed many buildings at the University of Richmond, including Jeter and Ryland Halls.

Richmond's position as a center of iron production helped to fuel the popularity of its cast-iron architecture. The city is home to a unique collection of cast iron porches, balconies, fences, and finials, second only to New Orleans in cast-iron concentration. At the height of production in the 1890s, 25 foundries operated in Richmond, employing nearly 3,500 metal workers. This number is seven times the number of general construction workers employed at the time, illustrating the importance of iron exports to the city. Porches and fences in urban neighborhoods, such as Jackson Ward, Church Hill, and Monroe Ward, are particularly elaborate, often featuring ornate iron casts never replicated outside of Richmond. In some cases, casts were made for a single residential or commercial application.

Richmond is home to several notable buildings designed by modernist masters. Minoru Yamasaki designed the Federal Reserve Building, which dominates the downtown skyline. The architectural firm of Skidmore, Owings & Merrill, home to Gordon Bunshaft, designed the Library of Virginia and the General Assembly Offices at the Eighth and Main Building. Philip Johnson designed the WRVA Building. Richard Neutra designed Rice House, a residence on a private James River Island, is Richmond's only true International Style home. Famed early modern architect and member of the Harvard Five, Landis Gores, designed the W.G. Harris residence in Richmond. Steven Holl designed the VCU Institute for Contemporary Art, opened in 2018. Other notable architects that have worked in the Richmond area include Rick Mather and I.M. Pei.

Richmond's urban residential neighborhoods, largely single use town homes with mixed full retail/dining establishments, are keys to the city's character. The Fan, the Museum District, Jackson Ward, Carver, Carytown, Oregon Hill, and Church Hill are districts anchored by large streets, such as Franklin Street, Cary Street, the Boulevard, and Monument Avenue. The city's recent population growth mainly has been concentrated in these areas.

=== Historic districts ===
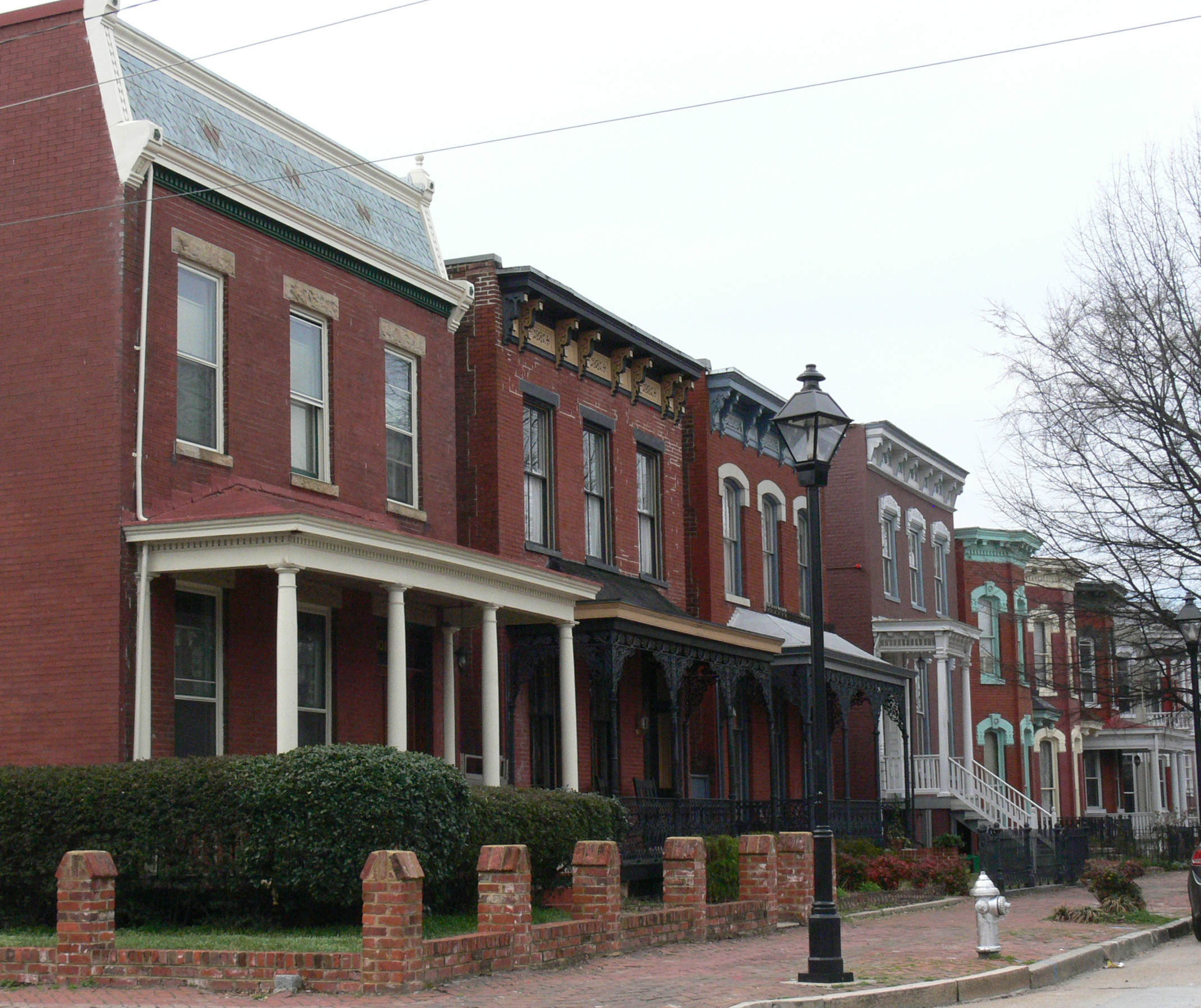
Jackson Ward is a historically African-American neighborhood

Richmond's city code provides for the creation of old and historic districts to "recognize and protect the historic, architectural, cultural, and artistic heritage of the City". Pursuant to that authority, the city has designated 45 districts. Most districts also are listed in the Virginia Landmarks Register ("VLR") and the National Register of Historic Places ("NRHP").

Fifteen districts represent broad sections of the city:

Historic district	City	VLR	NRHP (Note: The Virginia Department of Historic Resources maintains copies of the applications filed with the National Register of Historic Places.)
Boulevard (Grace St. to Idlewood Ave)	1992	1986	1986
Broad Street (Belvidere St. to First St.)	1985	1986	1987 2004 2007
Chimborazo Park (32nd to 36th Sts. & Marshall St. to Chimborazo Park)	1987	2004	2005
Church Hill North (Marshall to Cedar Sts. & Jefferson Ave. to N. 29th St.)	2007	1996	1997 2000
Hermitage Road (Laburnum Ave. to Westbrook Ave.)	1988	2005	2006
Jackson Ward (Belvidere to 2nd Sts. & Jackson to Marshall Sts.)	1987	1976	1976
Monument Avenue (Birch St. to Roseneath Rd.)	1971	1969	1970
St. John's Church (21st to 32nd Sts. & Broad to Franklin Sts.)	1957	1969	1966
Shockoe Slip (12th to 15th Sts. & Main to Canal/Dock Sts.)	1979	1971	1972
Shockoe Valley (18th to 21st Sts. & Marshall to Franklin Sts.)	1977	1981	1983
Springhill (19th to 22nd Sts. & Riverside Dr. to Semmes Ave.)	2006	2013	2014
200 Block West Franklin Street (Madison to Jefferson Sts.)	1977	1977	1977
West Franklin Street (Birch to Harrison Sts.)	1990	1972	1972
West Grace Street (Ryland St. to Boulevard)	1996	1997	1998
Zero Blocks East and West Franklin (Adams to First Sts. & Grace to Main Sts.)	1987	1979	1980

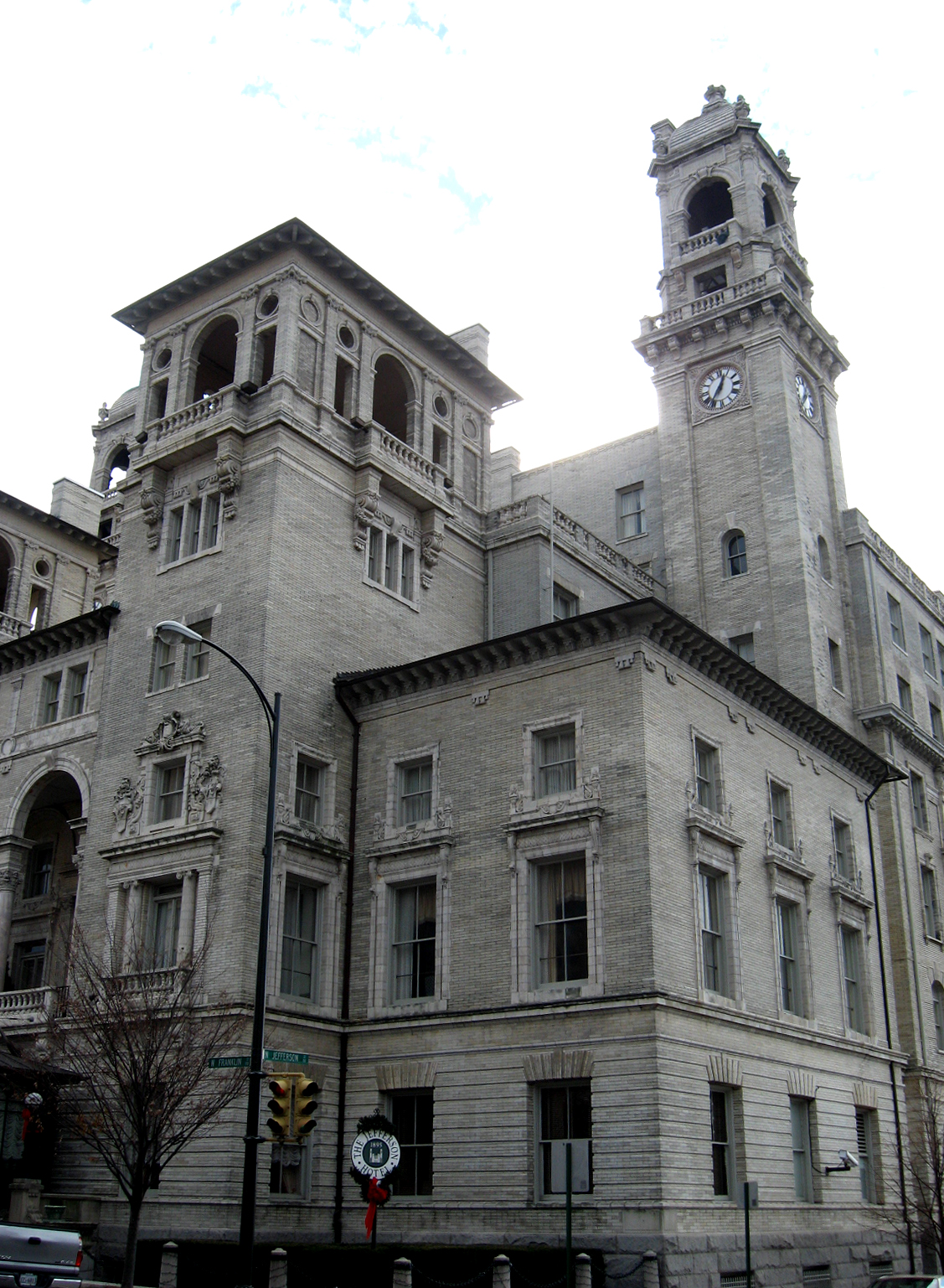
The Jefferson Hotel

The remaining thirty districts are limited to an individual building or group of buildings throughout the city:

Historic district	VLR	NRHP
The Barret House (15 South Fifth Street)	1971	1972
Belgian Building (Lombardy Street and Brook Road)	1969	1970
Bolling Haxall House (211 East Franklin Street)	1971	1972
Centenary United Methodist Church (409 East Grace Street)	1979	1979
Crozet House (100–102 East Main Street)	1971	1972
Glasgow House (1 West Main Street)	1972	1972
Hancock-Wirt-Caskie House (2 North Fifth Street)	1969	1970 2008
Henry Coalter Cabell House (116 South Third Street)	1971	1971
Jefferson Hotel (114 West Main Street)	1968	1969
John Marshall House (818 East Marshall Street)	1969	1966
Leigh Street Baptist Church (East Leigh and Twenty-Fifth Streets)	1971	1972
Linden Row (100–114 East Franklin Street)	1971	1971
Mayo Memorial House (110 West Franklin Street)	1972	1973
William W. Morien House (2226 West Main Street)		
Norman Stewart House (707 East Franklin Street)	1972	1972
Old Stone House (1916 East Main Street)	1973	1973
Pace House (100 West Franklin Street)		
St. Andrew's Episcopal Church (Northwest corner South Laurel Street and Idlewood Avenue)	1979	1979
St. Paul's Episcopal Church (815 East Grace Street)	1968	1969
St. Peter's Catholic Church (800 East Grace Street)	1968	1969
Second Presbyterian Church (9 North Fifth Street)	1971	1972
Sixth Mount Zion Baptist Church (12–14 West Duval Street)	1996	1996
Stonewall Jackson School (1520 West Main Street)	1984	1984
Talavera (2315 West Grace Street)		
Valentine Museum and Wickham-Valentine House (1005–1015 East Clay Street)	1968	1969
Virginia House (4301 Sulgrave Road)	1989	1990
White House of the Confederacy (1200 East Clay Street)	1969	1966
Wilton (215 South Wilton Road)	1975	1976
Joseph P. Winston House (103 East Grace Street)	1978	1979
Woodward House-Rockets (3017 Williamsburg Avenue)	1974	1974

=== Food ===
Richmond has been recognized in recent years as a "foodie city", particularly for its modern renditions of traditional Southern cuisine. The city also claims the invention of the sailor sandwich, which includes pastrami, knockwurst, Swiss cheese and mustard on rye bread. Richmond is where canned beer was first made commercially available in 1935.

== Sports ==
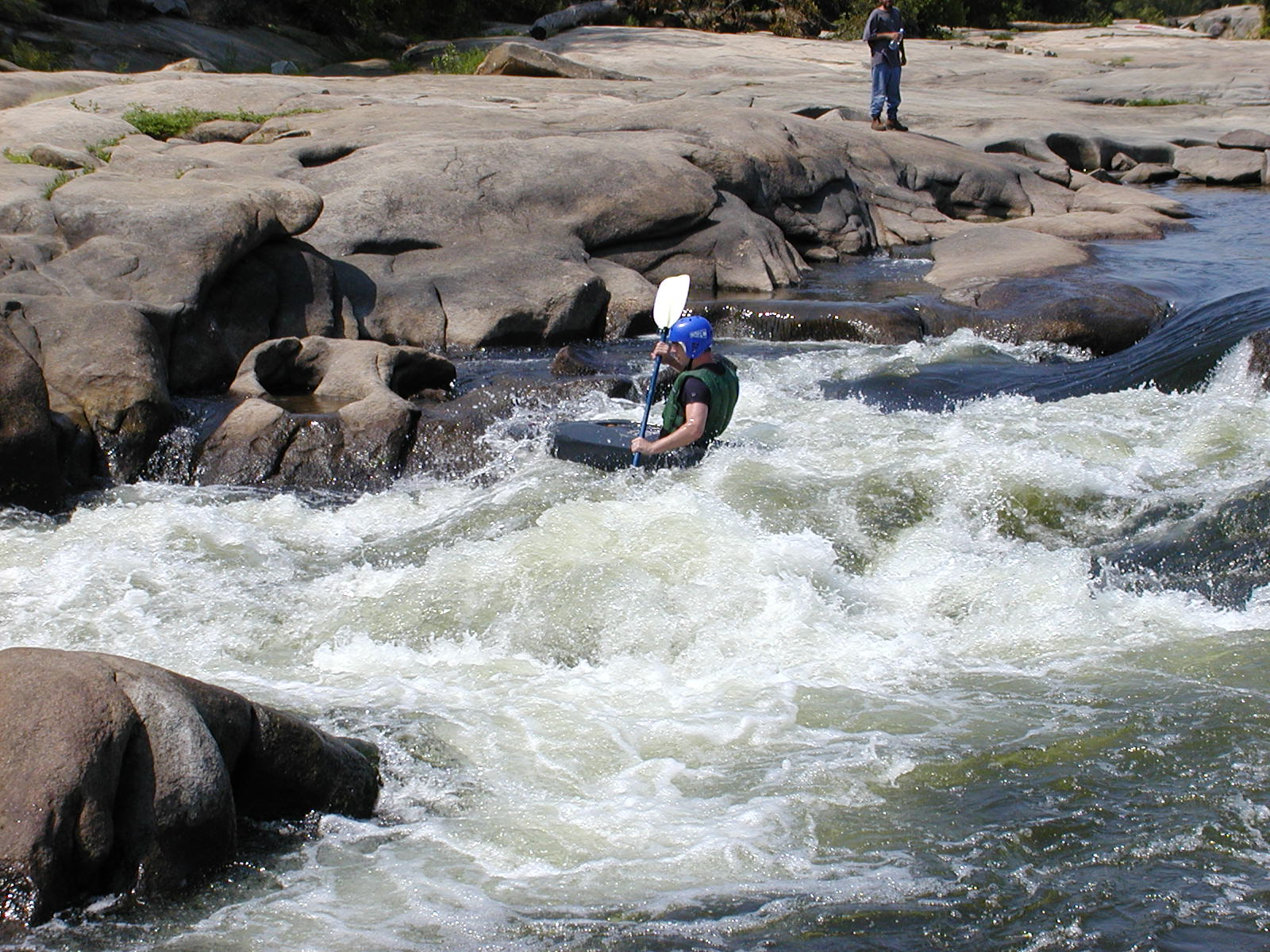
Richmond features class IV rapids

Richmond does not have a major league professional sports team. The city has several minor league sports franchises, including the Richmond Kickers of USL League One and the Richmond Flying Squirrels of the Class AA Eastern League of Minor League Baseball, a San Francisco Giants affiliate. The Kickers began playing in Richmond in 1993, making them the oldest continually operated professional club in the United States. The club now plays home matches at City Stadium. In 2018, the Richmond Kickers left the USL to be founders in Division 3 Soccer. The Squirrels opened their first season at The Diamond on April 15, 2010. From 1966 through 2008, the city was home to the Richmond Braves, a AAA affiliate of the Atlanta Braves of Major League Baseball, until the franchise relocated to Georgia.

Richmond is home to the Richmond Black Widows, the city's first women's football team, founded in 2015 by Sarah Schkeeper. The team is in the Women's Football Alliance, which preseason begins in January and regular season in April.

Tennis is popular in Richmond. In 2010, the United States Tennis Association named Richmond the third "Best Tennis Town", after Charleston, South Carolina, and Atlanta, Georgia.

Richmond hosted the 2015 UCI Road World Championships, which had cyclists from 76 countries and an estimated beneficial $158.1 million economic impact on the Greater Richmond Region from event staging and visitor spending. The championship course was the first real-world location to be recreated within the indoor cycle training application, Zwift. The application has subsequently added two other UCI world championships courses, Innsbruck from 2018 and Harrogate from 2019.

The city is home to the University of Richmond football team, who most notably won the 2008 NCAA Division I FCS National Championship. The team plays its home games at Robins Stadium.

Richmond also has seen recent men's and women's college basketball success in the Atlantic 10 Conference. The Richmond Spiders play at the Robins Center and the VCU Rams play at the Stuart C. Siegel Center. The Stuart C. Siegel Center is home to the Virginia High School Basketball Championships as well.

The 0.75-mile Richmond Raceway is located in nearby Henrico County and hosts auto racing, including NASCAR events.

== Parks and recreation ==
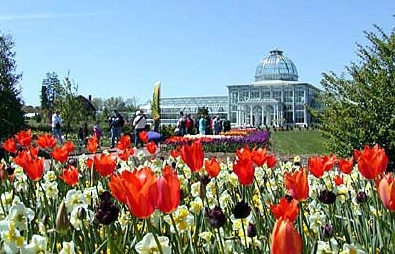
Lewis Ginter Botanical Garden

The city operates one of the country's oldest municipal park systems. In 1851, the City Council voted to acquire 7.5 acres (30,000 m^{2}), now known as Monroe Park. Monroe Park is adjacent to the Virginia Commonwealth University campus, and is one of over 40 parks totaling more than 1,500 acres (610 ha).

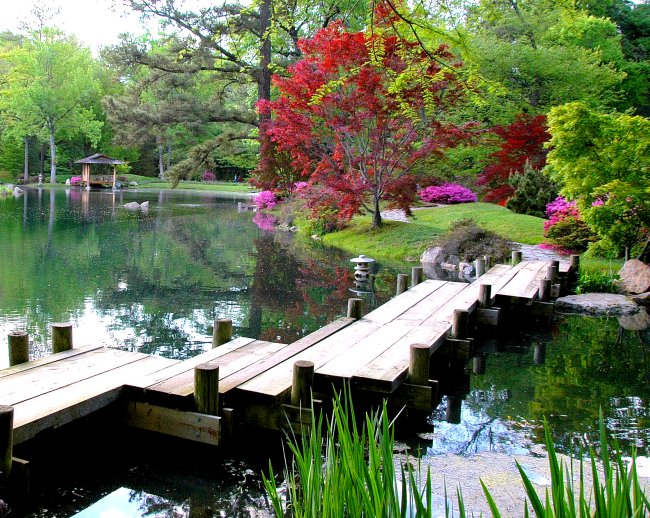
Japanese Garden at Maymont

Other city parks include Joseph Bryan Park Azalea Garden, Forest Hill Park (former site of the Forest Hill Amusement Park), and Chimborazo Park (site of the National Battlefield Headquarters).

=== James River ===
Several of the city's parks are along the James River, many of which are a part of the James River Parks System, which offers bike trails, hiking and nature trails, and many scenic overlooks. The trails are used for the Xterra East Championship running and mountain biking courses of the off-road triathlon.

Parks exist on two major islands in the James River, Belle Isle and Brown's Island. Belle Isle, a former Powhatan fishing village, colonial-era horse race track, and Civil War prison camp, is the larger of the two. It contains many bike trails and a small cliff used for rock climbing instruction. The island still has many remnants of the Civil War prison camp, including an arms storage room and a gun emplacement used to quell prisoner riots. Brown's Island is smaller and a popular venue for many spring and summer free outdoor concerts and festivals, such as the weekly Friday Cheers concert series and the James River Beer and Seafood Festival.

Richmond is the only city in the United States with Class IV rapids running through it.

Two other major city parks along the river are Byrd Park and Maymont, located near Randolph, Carytown, and the Fan District. Byrd Park features a one mi (1.6 km) running track, with exercise stops, a public dog park, and a number of small lakes for small boats, as well as two monuments, Buddha house and an amphitheater. The World War I Memorial Carillon, built in 1926, features prominently in the park. Maymont, adjacent to Byrd Park, is a 100-acre (40 ha) Victorian estate with a museum, formal gardens, native wildlife exhibits, nature center, carriage collection, and children's farm.

== Government ==
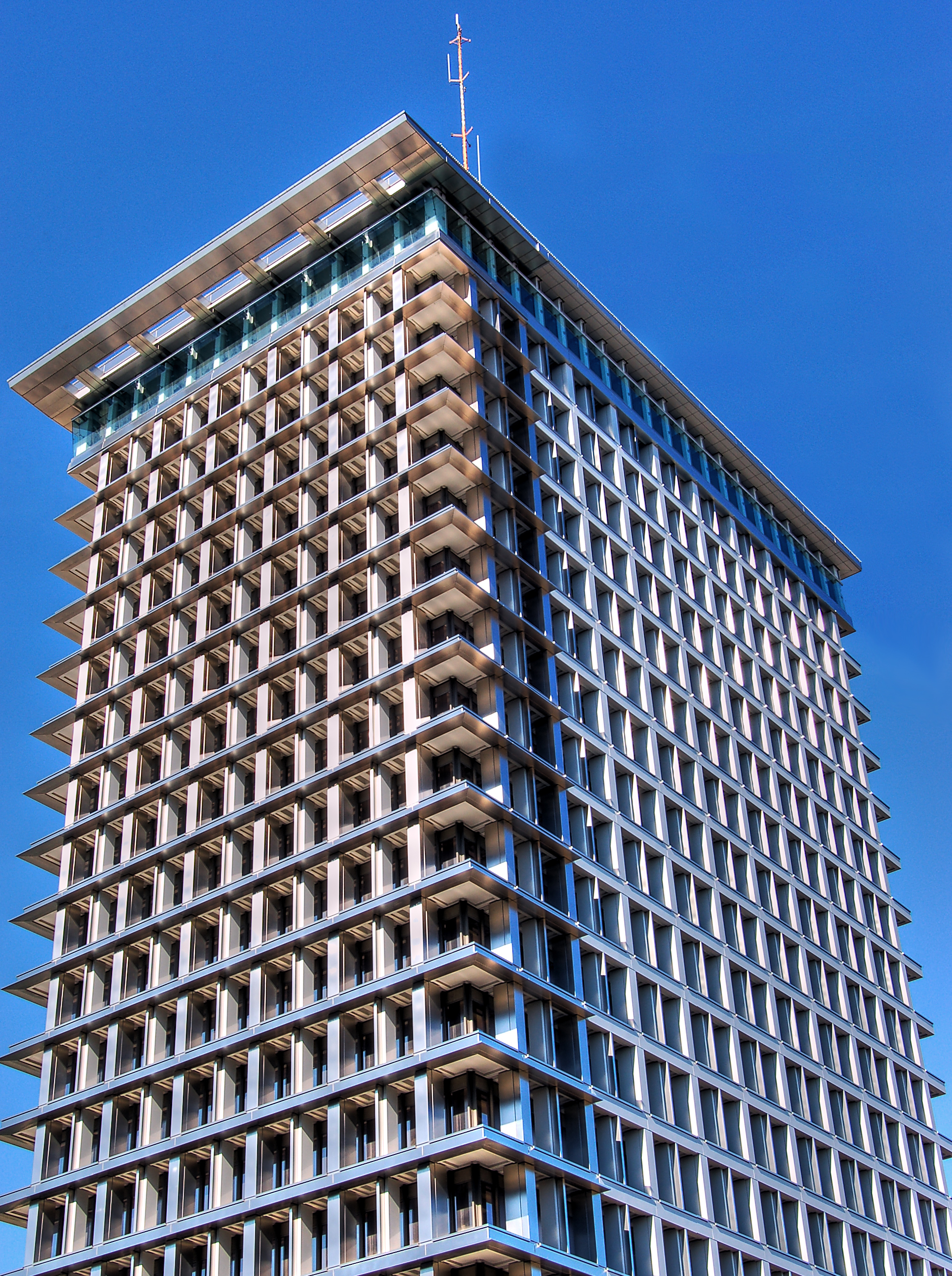
Richmond City Hall

United States presidential election results for Richmond, Virginia
Year	Republican		Democratic		Third party(ies)	
Year	No.	%	No.	%	No.	%
1880	2,158	28.75%	5,348	71.24%	1	0.01%
1884	5,716	42.92%	7,599	57.05%	4	0.03%
1888	976	45.61%	1,155	53.97%	9	0.42%
1892	3,289	24.28%	10,139	74.85%	117	0.86%
1896	5,160	38.42%	7,839	58.36%	433	3.22%
1900	2,729	30.60%	6,095	68.35%	93	1.04%
1904	569	12.96%	3,749	85.40%	72	1.64%
1908	1,135	21.29%	4,142	77.68%	55	1.03%
1912	405	6.12%	5,632	85.04%	586	8.85%
1916	1,210	14.57%	6,987	84.15%	106	1.28%
1920	4,515	23.04%	14,878	75.93%	202	1.03%
1924	2,600	19.37%	9,904	73.79%	917	6.83%
1928	10,767	51.32%	10,213	48.68%	0	0.00%
1932	5,602	27.09%	14,631	70.75%	448	2.17%
1936	4,478	19.18%	18,784	80.45%	86	0.37%
1940	6,031	23.71%	19,332	75.99%	76	0.30%
1944	8,737	27.84%	22,584	71.95%	66	0.21%
1948	14,549	41.21%	16,466	46.64%	4,286	12.14%
1952	29,300	60.28%	19,235	39.57%	75	0.15%
1956	27,367	61.79%	10,758	24.29%	6,166	13.92%
1960	27,307	60.41%	17,642	39.03%	256	0.57%
1964	27,196	43.24%	35,662	56.71%	32	0.05%
1968	26,380	39.57%	32,857	49.28%	7,431	11.15%
1972	46,244	57.59%	33,055	41.16%	1,003	1.25%
1976	37,176	44.73%	44,687	53.77%	1,247	1.50%
1980	34,629	39.76%	47,975	55.08%	4,502	5.17%
1984	38,754	43.73%	49,408	55.75%	466	0.53%
1988	31,586	42.26%	42,155	56.41%	995	1.33%
1992	24,341	30.53%	47,642	59.75%	7,752	9.72%
1996	20,993	31.30%	42,273	63.02%	3,812	5.68%
2000	20,265	30.74%	42,717	64.80%	2,944	4.47%
2004	21,637	29.11%	52,167	70.19%	521	0.70%
2008	18,649	20.03%	73,623	79.09%	813	0.87%
2012	20,050	20.55%	75,921	77.81%	1,598	1.64%
2016	15,581	15.06%	81,259	78.52%	6,644	6.42%
2020	16,603	14.94%	92,175	82.92%	2,381	2.14%
2024	17,041	15.67%	88,710	81.59%	2,980	2.74%

Richmond city government consists of a city council with representatives from nine districts serving in a legislative and oversight capacity, as well as a popularly elected, at-large mayor serving as head of the executive branch. Citizens in each of the nine districts elect one council representative each to serve a four-year term. Beginning with the November 2008 election, council terms were lengthened to four years. The city council elects from among its members one member to serve as council president and one to serve as council vice president. The city council meets at City Hall, located at 900 E. Broad St., 2nd Floor, on the second and fourth Mondays of every month, except August.

In 1977, a federal district court ruled in favor of Curtis Holt Jr. who had claimed the council's existing election process — an at large voting system — was racially biased. The verdict required the city to rebuild its council into nine distinct wards. Within the year the city council switched from majority white to majority black, reflecting the city's populace. This new city council elected Richmond's first black mayor, Henry L. Marsh.

Richmond's government changed in 2004 from a council–manager form of government with a mayor elected by and from the council to an at-large, popularly elected mayor. Unlike most major cities, in order to be elected, a mayoral candidate must win a plurality of the vote in five of the city's nine council districts. If no one crosses that threshold, a runoff is held between the two top finishers in the first round. This was implemented as a compromise in order to address concerns that better-organized and wealthier white voters could have undue influence. In a landslide election, incumbent mayor Rudy McCollum was defeated by L. Douglas Wilder, who previously served Virginia as the first elected African American governor in the United States since Reconstruction. Levar Stoney served as Mayor from 2016 to 2024. Dr. Danny Avula was sworn is as mayor on December 31, 2024.

The mayor is not a part of the Richmond City Council.

As of 2025, the Richmond City Council consisted of:

- Andrew S. Breton, 1st district (West End)
- Katherine L. Jordan, 2nd district (North Central), council vice president
- Kenya J. Gibson, 3rd district (Northside)
- Sarah M.A. Abubaker, 4th district (Southwest)
- Stephanie A. Lynch, 5th district (Central)
- Ellen F. Robertson, 6th district (Gateway),
- Cynthia I. Newbille, 7th district (East End), council president
- Reva M. Trammell, 8th district (Southside)
- Nicole Jones, 9th district (South Central)

== Education ==
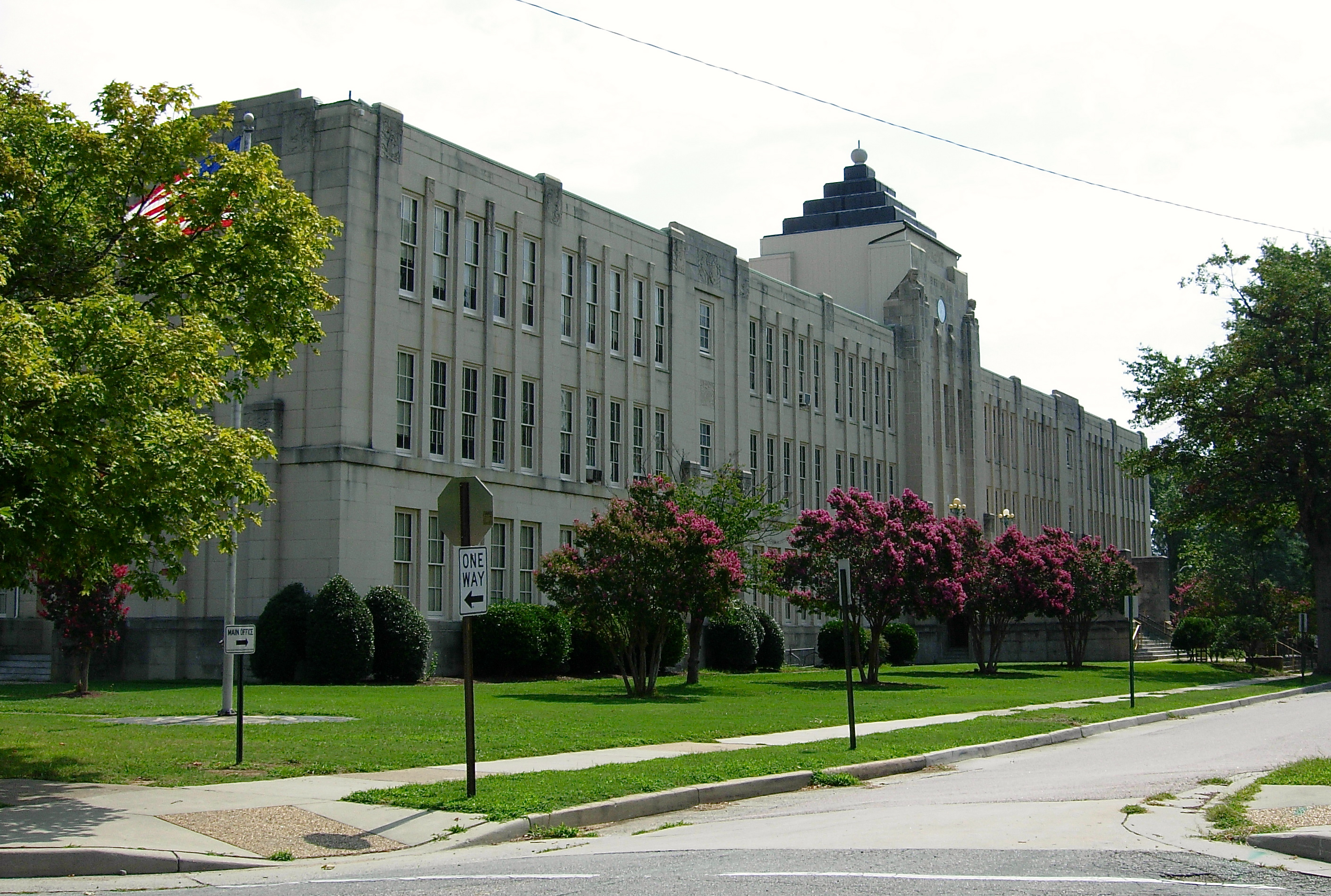
The Art Deco-styled Thomas Jefferson High School in the near West End

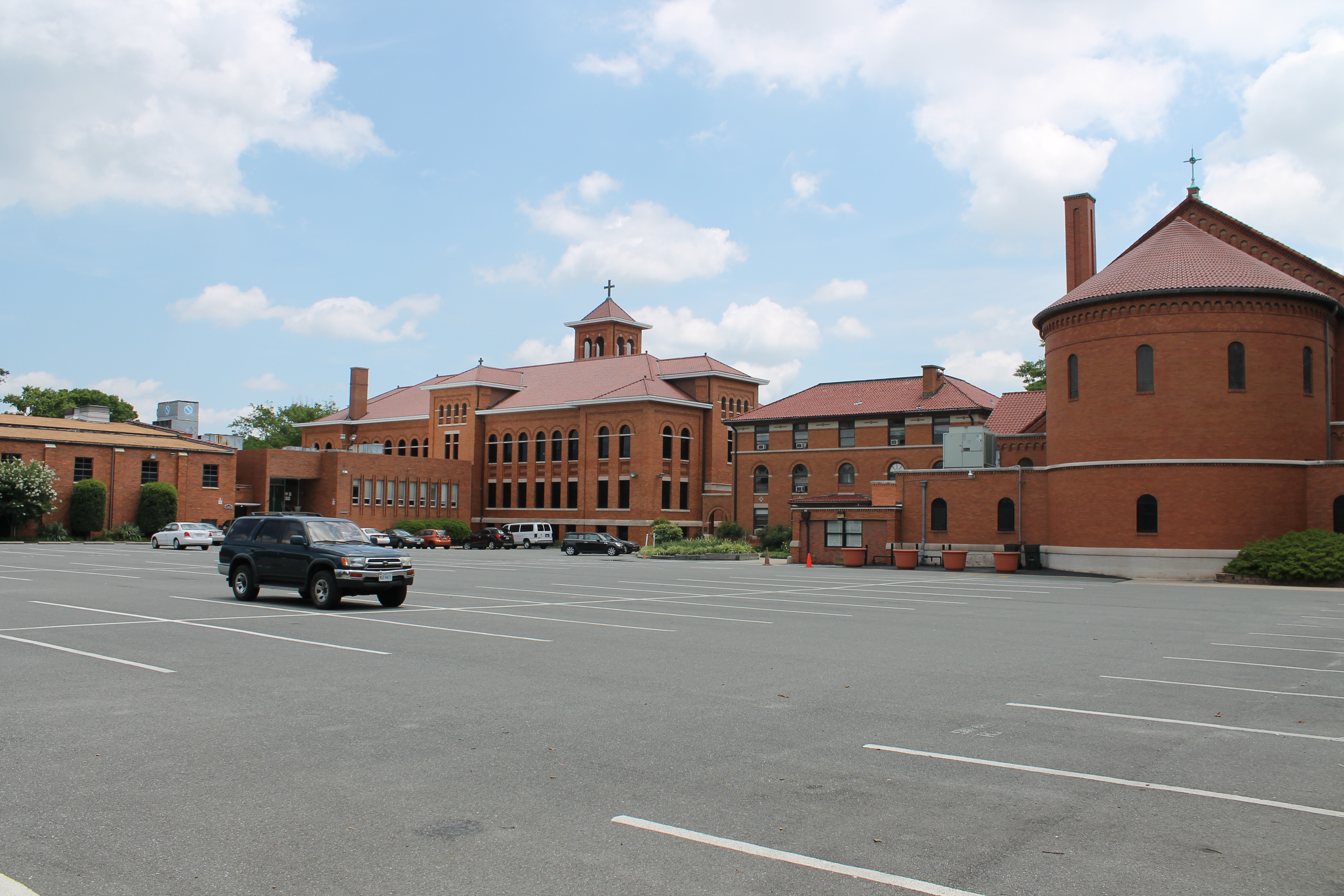
The Romanesque Revival-style of the former Benedictine College Preparatory in the Museum District

=== Public schools ===
The City of Richmond operates 28 elementary schools, seven middle schools, and eight high schools, serving a total student population of 24,000. The city has one Governor's School, the Maggie L. Walker Governor's School for Government and International Studies. In 2008, it was named one of Newsweek magazine's 18 "public elite" high schools, and rated 16 of America's best high schools in 2012. Richmond's public school district also runs one of Virginia's four public charter schools, the Patrick Henry School of Science and Arts, founded in 2010. The 2020 class had an on-time graduation rate of 71.6%, at least 20 percentage points behind most other school divisions, making it the worst in the state.

=== Private schools ===
As of 2008, there were 36 private schools serving grades one or higher in the City of Richmond. Some of these schools include: Banner Christian School; St. Bridget School; Brook Road Academy; Collegiate School; Grace Christian School; Grove Christian School; Guardian Christian Academy; St. Christopher's School; St. Catherine's School; Southside Baptist Christian School; Northstar Academy; The Steward School; Trinity Episcopal School; The New Community School; and Veritas School.

The city's only Catholic high school is Cristo Rey Richmond High School, after Benedictine College Preparatory and St. Gertrude High School relocated to a combined campus in Goochland.

=== Colleges and universities ===
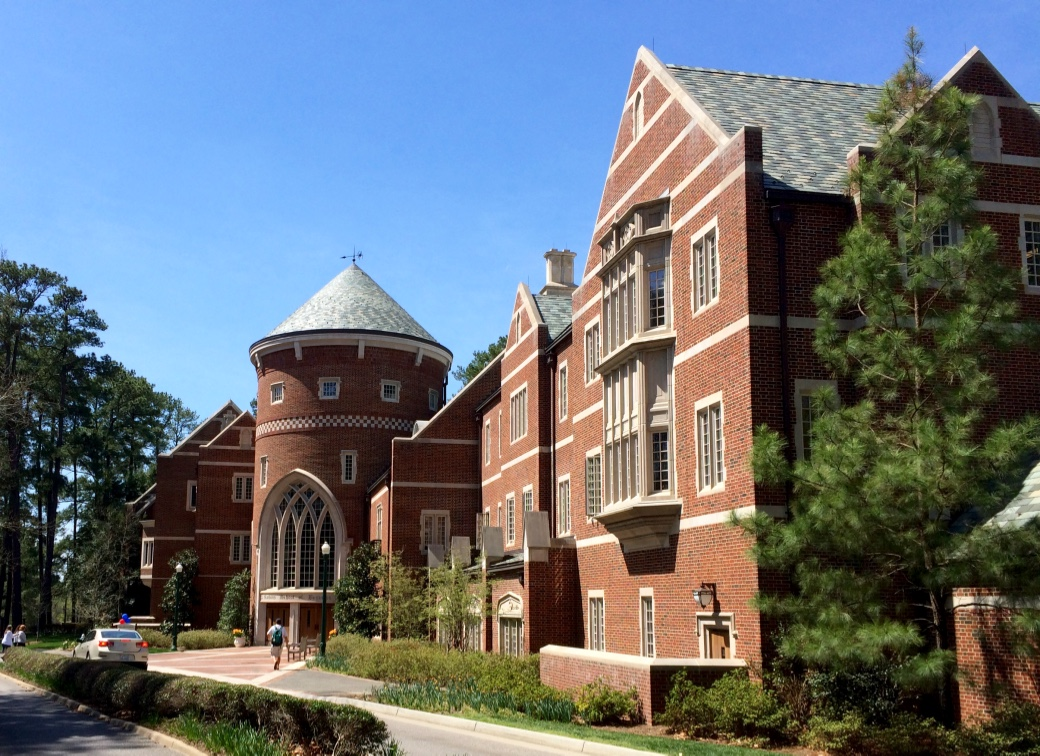
The Robins School of Business at the University of Richmond

The Richmond area has many major institutions of higher education, including Virginia Commonwealth University (public), University of Richmond (private), Virginia Union University (private), South University–Richmond (private, for-profit), Union Theological Seminary & Presbyterian School of Christian Education (private), and the Baptist Theological Seminary in Richmond (BTSR—private). Several community colleges are in the metro area, including J. Sargeant Reynolds Community College and Brightpoint Community College (Chesterfield County). Several technical colleges are in Richmond, including ITT Technical Institute, ECPI College of Technology, and Centura College. The same is true of vocational colleges, including Fortis College and Bryant Stratton College.

Virginia State University is located about 20 mi (32 km) south of Richmond, in Ettrick, just outside Petersburg. Randolph-Macon College is located about 15 mi (24 km) north of Richmond, in Ashland.

== Media ==
The Richmond Times-Dispatch, owned by Lee Enterprises, Inc., is the local daily newspaper, with a Sunday circulation of 120,000. Style Weekly, an online alternative local publication owned by VPM Media Corporation, covers popular culture, arts, and entertainment. The Richmond Free Press and the Voice cover the news from an African-American perspective.

== Infrastructure ==
=== Transportation ===
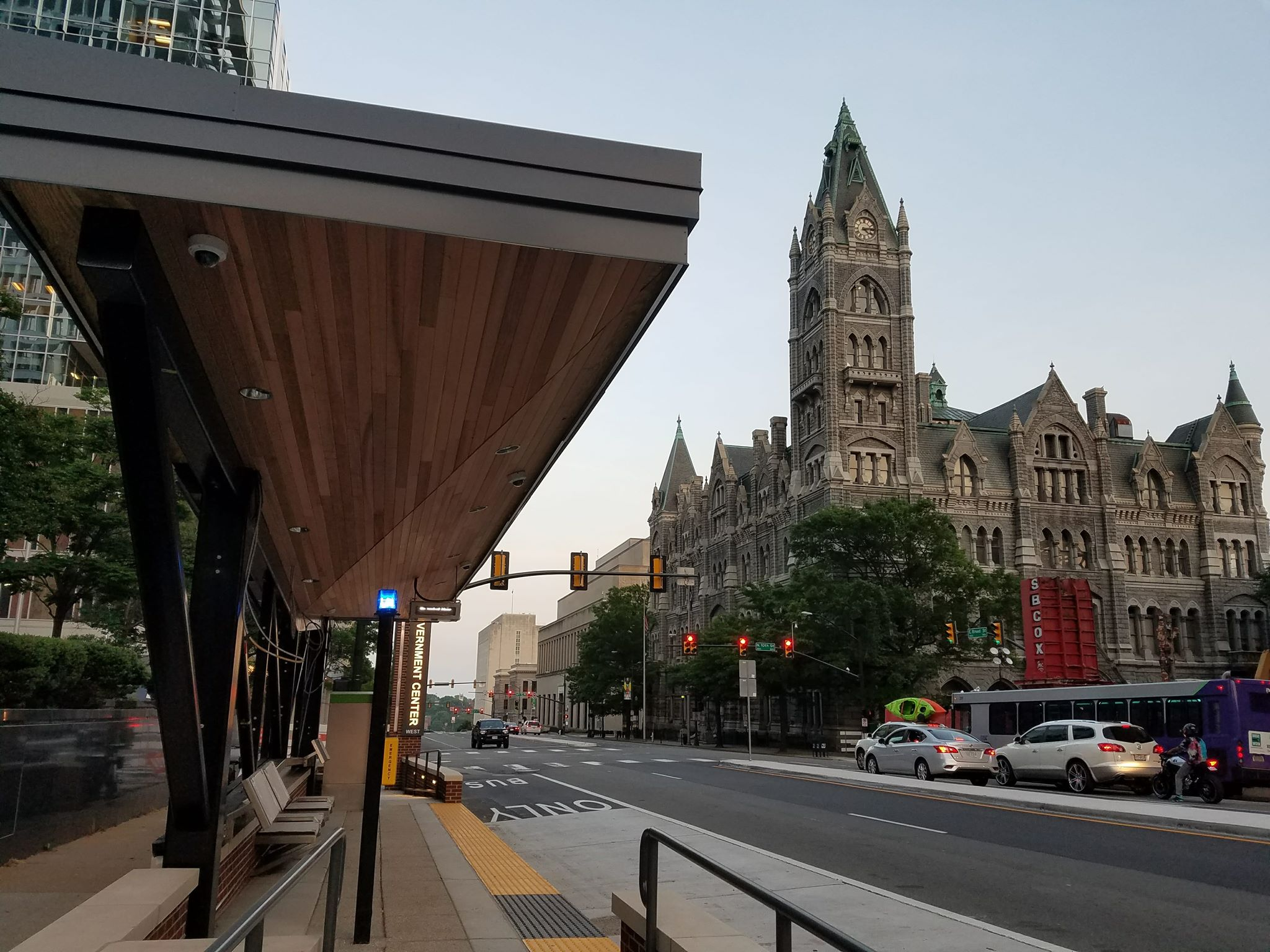
The Government Center GRTC Pulse bus station in Downtown Richmond

The Greater Richmond area is served by the Richmond International Airport (IATA: RIC, ICAO: KRIC), located in Sandston, seven mi (11 km) southeast of Richmond and within an hour drive of historic Williamsburg, Virginia. Richmond International is served by ten passenger and four cargo airlines, with over 200 daily flights providing non-stop service to major domestic destinations and connecting flights to worldwide destinations. A record 4.8 million passengers used Richmond International Airport in 2023, breaking the previous record of 4.4 million in 2019.

Richmond is a major hub for intercity bus company Greyhound Lines. Multiple daily runs connect directly with Washington, D.C., New York, Raleigh, and elsewhere. Direct trips to New York take approximately 7.5 hours. Discount carrier Megabus provides curbside service from Main Street Station. Direct service is available to Washington, D.C., Hampton Roads, Charlotte, Raleigh, Baltimore, and Philadelphia. Connections to Megabus-served cities, such as New York, are made from Washington, D.C.

The Greater Richmond Transit Company (GRTC) provides transit and paratransit bus service in Richmond and Henrico and Chesterfield counties. The GRTC, however, serves only small parts of the suburban counties. The far West End, Innsbrook and Short Pump, and almost all of Chesterfield County have no public transportation, despite dense housing, retail, and office development. According to a 2008 GRTC operations analysis report, a majority of GRTC riders use their services because they do not have available alternatives, such as a private vehicle. In 2014, U.S. Department of Transportation granted Richmond and the surrounding metropolitan area a roughly $25 million grant for the GRTC Pulse bus rapid transit system, which opened in June 2018, running along Broad Street from Willow Lawn to Rocketts Landing.

The Richmond area has two railroad stations served by Amtrak. Each station receives regular service from north of Richmond, including Washington, D.C., Philadelphia, and New York. The region's main station, Staples Mill Road Station, is located just outside the city on a major north–south freight line that receives service to and from all points south, including Raleigh, Durham, Charlotte, Savannah, Newport News, Norfolk and Florida. The historic Main Street Station, renovated in 2004, is the only railway station in the City of Richmond. As of 2010, it only receives trains headed to and from Newport News due to track layout.

Richmond also benefits from an excellent interstate highway position, lying at the junction of east–west Interstate 64 and north–south Interstate 95, two of the most heavily traveled highways in the state. As the state capital, Richmond has great state highway access.

=== Major highways ===
- I-64
- I-95 (Richmond–Petersburg Turnpike)
- I-195 (Beltline Expy)
- I-295
- US 1 (Brook Road, Azelea Avenue, Chamberlayne Avenue, Belvedere Street, Cowardin Avenue, Jefferson Davis Highway)
- US 33 (Staples Mill Road, Broad Street)
- US 60
- US 250 (Broad Street)
- US 301 (Chamberlayne Avenue, Belvedere Street, Cowardin Avenue, Jefferson Davis Highway)
- US 360 (Hull Street Road; Hull Street; North 14th Street; joins US 60 Main Street; WB 17th Street [Oliver Hill Way], EB West 18th Street; Mechanicsville Turnpike)
- SR 5 (East Main Street; North 25th Street)
- SR 6 (Kensington Avenue, Patterson Avenue)
- SR 10 (Broad Rock Boulevard)
- SR 33
- SR 76 (Powhite Parkway toll route)
- SR 146 (Connector to VA-195)
- SR 147 (Cary Street [EB after I-195], West Main Street [WB after I-195], Cary Street Road, River Road, Huguenot Road [S of the James River])
- SR 150 (Chippenham Parkway)
- SR 161 (Hermitage Road, The Boulevard, Park Drive, Blanton Avenue, Westover Hills Boulevard, Belt Boulevard, Bells Road)
- SR 195 (toll route) (Downtown Expressway)
- SR 197 (Malvern Avenue, Westwood Avenue, Saunders Avenue, West Laburnum Avenue)
- SR 353 (Entrance to the Grounds of the Virginia Commonwealth University)
- SR 895 (Pocohontas Parkway toll route)

=== Utilities ===
Dominion Energy supplies the Richmond Metro area's electricity. Headquartered in Richmond, it is one of the nation's largest producers of energy, serving retail energy customers in nine states. Electricity for the Richmond area is primarily produced at the North Anna Nuclear Generating Station, Surry Nuclear Generating Station, and a coal-fired station in Chester, Virginia. These three plants provide a total of 4,453 megawatts of power. Several other natural gas plants provide extra power during peak demands, including facilities in Chester, and Surry, and two in Richmond, Gravel Neck and Darbytown.

Richmond's Department of Public Utilities provides the Richmond Metro area's natural gas, including portions of Henrico and Chesterfield counties. It also supplies water to the city and surrounding area through wholesale contracts with Henrico, Chesterfield, and Hanover counties. The DPU is one of Virginia's largest water producers, providing water to approximately 500,000 people, including 62,000 city customers, through a distribution system of water mains, pumping stations, storage facilities, and a modern plant that can treat up to 132 million gallons daily from the James River.

The wastewater treatment plant is on the James River's south bank. It can treat up to 70 million gallons of water per day of sanitary sewage and stormwater before returning it to the river. The wastewater utility also operates and maintains 1,500 mi (2,400 km) of sanitary sewer and pumping stations, 38 mi (61 km) of intercepting sewer lines, and the Shockoe Retention Basin, a 44-million-gallon stormwater reservoir used during heavy rains.

== Sister cities ==
Richmond's sister cities are:

- Richmond upon Thames, United Kingdom
- Saitama, Japan
- Ségou, Mali
- Windhoek, Namibia
- Zhengzhou, China
- Olsztyn, Poland

== See also ==
- Culture of Virginia
- Richmond Police Department
- Richmond Public Library
- USS Richmond, 3 ships
- Category:People from Richmond, Virginia
