= Greater Richmond Transit Company =

Government-owned public service company based in Richmond, Virginia, United States

GRTC

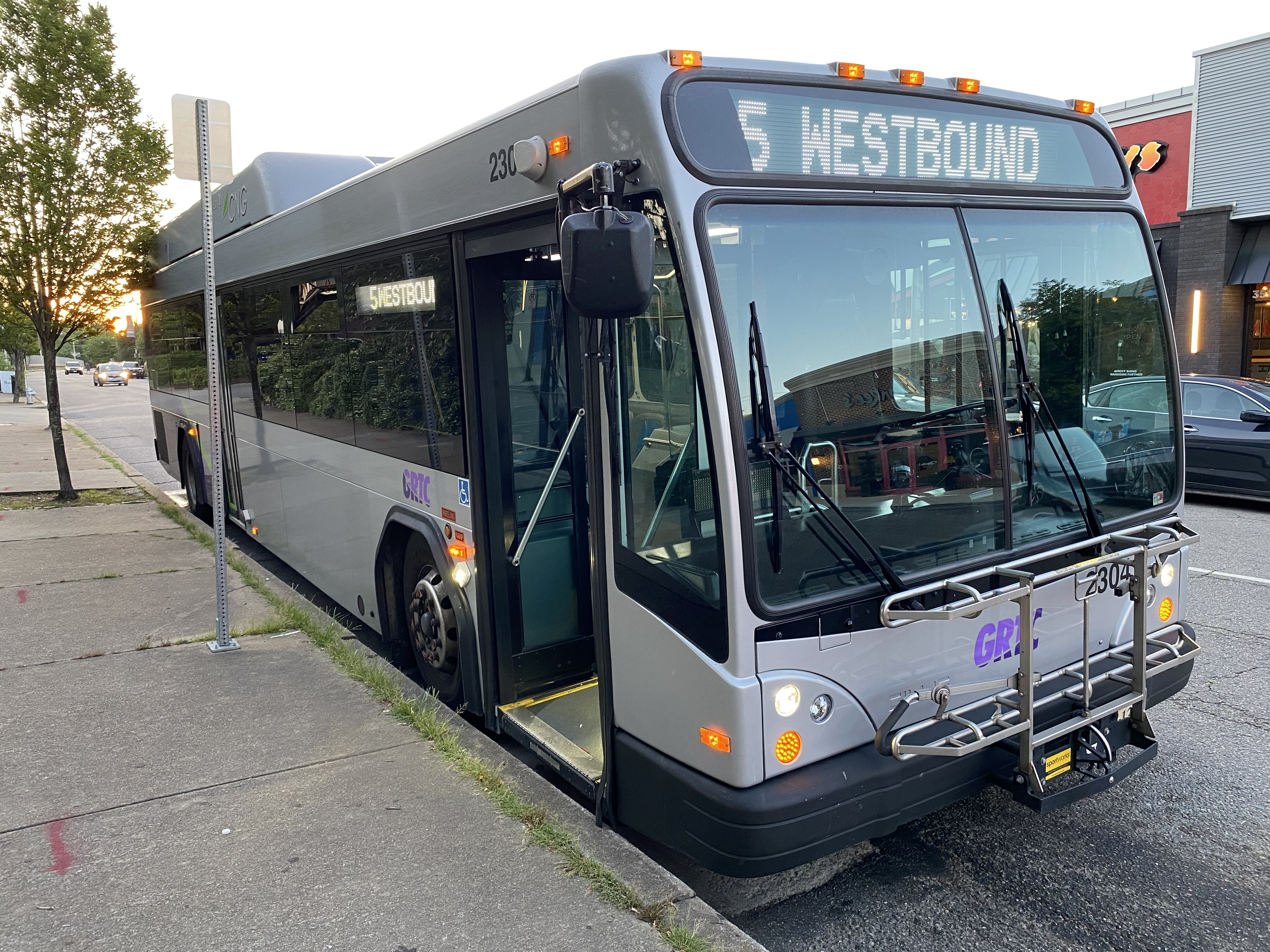
- GRTC 2021 Gillig BRT CNG 2304 On Route 5 To Whitcomb Court
- Founded: 1973
- Headquarters: 301 East Belt Boulevard
- Locale: Richmond, Virginia
- Service area: Richmond, Virginia
- Service type: Bus service Paratransit
- Alliance: Petersburg Area Transit
- Routes: Local: 34; Express: 4; Bus rapid transit (Pulse): 1
- Fleet: 253 buses & vans
- Daily ridership: 35,700 (weekdays, Q2 2026)
- Annual ridership: 11,940,100 (2025)
- Fuel type: CNG; Diesel
- Operator: National Express Transit (CARE Vans only)
- Chief executive: Sheryl Adams
- Website: ridegrtc.com

The Greater Richmond Transit Company (GRTC) is a local government-owned public service company based in Richmond, Virginia. In 2025, the system had a ridership of 11,940,100, or about 35,700 per weekday as of the second quarter of 2026.

GRTC primarily serves the independent city of Richmond and portions of the adjacent counties of Henrico, Hanover, Powhatan, and Chesterfield with a fleet of over 157 diesel-powered and CNG-powered transit buses operating approximately 45 routes. GRTC uses government-funded equipment and resources principally provided by the Federal Transit Administration (FTA), Virginia Department of Rail and Public Transportation (VDRPT), and local funds.

On June 24, 2018, GRTC launched its first bus rapid transit (BRT) line, the "GRTC Pulse." Running 7.6 miles from Rocketts Landing to Willow Lawn, it offers high-capacity service along Broad and Main Streets and has earned a Bronze Standard BRT rating from the Institute for Transportation and Development Policy (ITDP). In 2023, GRTC approved plans for a second BRT line, the North-South Pulse, which will extend 12 miles from Henrico County to Southside Plaza and Midlothian Turnpike, with construction set to begin in 2029.

== History ==
The GRTC is descended in a long line of transportation companies in Richmond. The first was established in 1860 as the Richmond Railway, a horse drawn trolley system. This line failed and was bought in 1881 by the Richmond City Railway. In 1888, a new, electrified system was built by the Richmond Union Passenger Railway. This was the first effective electric trolley system in the United States. The two companies were merged along with three other electric and lighting companies to form the Richmond Railway and Electric Company in 1890, later reincorporated into the expanded Richmond Passenger and Power Company in 1900. One year later, the name was altered to the Virginia Passenger and Power Company, which defaulted in its payment in 1904 and was bought in 1909 by the Virginia Railway and Power Company. In 1925, ownership changed hands again and the company became the Virginia Electric and Power Company (VEPCO).

By 1944, the Securities and Exchange Commission had determined that VEPCO had too much monopoly power and ordered its transportation and electric businesses to be split up. As a result, VEPCO (later rebranded to Dominion Energy) sold the streetcar business to the Virginia Transit Company (VTC). In 1949, the last streetcars stopped operating and were succeeded by gas powered buses. In 1973, the city of Richmond purchased the VTC and created the Greater Richmond Transit Company. A one half ownership interest was purchased by Chesterfield County in 1989. The Pulse, a rapid transit route running along Broad Street, was initiated in 2018. The GRTC Zero Fare Program began in 2020 during the COVID-19 pandemic to reduce physical contact between drivers and passengers. It also made commuting more affordable for many riders, especially workers who relied on GRTC to get to work.

== GRTC Pulse (Bus rapid transit) ==
The GRTC Pulse is a bus rapid transit (BRT) system serving the Richmond, Virginia metropolitan area. It was launched on June 24, 2018, through a partnership between the U.S. Department of Transportation, the Commonwealth of Virginia (including the Virginia Department of Rail and Public Transportation and the Virginia Department of Transportation), the City of Richmond, and Henrico County.

The Pulse operates along a 7.6-mile route, connecting Rocketts Landing in the City of Richmond to Willow Lawn in Henrico County, via Broad Street and Main Street. It provides a modern, high-capacity, and reliable transit service designed to improve travel times and accessibility in the region.

The GRTC Pulse has been recognized with a Bronze Standard BRT rating by the Institute for Transportation and Development Policy (ITDP), highlighting its quality and efficiency. The service is jointly sponsored by Bon Secours Richmond Health System and VCU Health System, and connects riders to key destinations, including businesses, services, and restaurants along its route.

=== Expansion of the GRTC Pulse ===
The GRTC Pulse, Richmond's Bus Rapid Transit (BRT) system, is undergoing significant expansion to meet increasing demand for public transportation across the region. With existing vehicles operating at capacity, GRTC is working on a series of projects to expand and improve the Pulse network. These projects range from station modifications to accommodate larger buses to major extensions and the introduction of new routes.

==== Station modifications ====
The current 26 Pulse stations were originally designed to serve approximately 3,500 daily passengers. However, daily ridership now exceeds 6,100, leading to crowded vehicles operating at maximum capacity. To address this, GRTC announced in 2023 that they would purchase four 60-foot (18 m) New Flyer XN60 articulated buses to relieve congestion on the route. GRTC plans to eventually replace all of the 40-foot (12 m) buses used on the Pulse with XN60 buses. The new buses were scheduled to go into service in 2025.

To accommodate these larger buses, GRTC plans to modify the existing stations by removing the brick knee wall bordering the platform, ensuring all three bus doors can be utilized. Station modifications are expected to take 260 days, with completion anticipated by the summer of 2025. Construction will begin at the East Riverfront station on September 23, 2024.

==== Western extension ====
As demand for transit along West Broad Street continues to rise, GRTC, in collaboration with Henrico County, is planning a four-mile extension of the Pulse line. This extension will expand the service from Willow Lawn to Parham Road, adding eight new stations and additional dedicated bus lanes. It will also introduce a park-and-ride location, a new feature for the Pulse system. The Western Extension is currently in Phase 2 of its study, which includes preliminary design and environmental assessments under the National Environmental Policy Act (NEPA).

==== North-South Pulse ====
In 2022, studies began on a North-South BRT corridor, travelling along U.S 1 In October 2023, the GRTC Board of Directors approved the recommended route for the proposed North-South BRT.

The North-South Pulse project aims to introduce 12 miles of high-capacity rapid transit, connecting northern and southern parts of the Richmond region via downtown. The route will run from Azalea in Henrico County, down U.S. Route 1, through downtown Richmond, and across the 9th Street Bridge to Southside Plaza. It will then continue along Belt Boulevard and the Midlothian Turnpike, terminating at Springline & Stonebridge. Studies on this Bus Rapid Transit (BRT) corridor began in 2022, and by October 2023, the GRTC Board of Directors approved the recommended route. Currently in Phase 2, focusing on station location and environmental assessments, the project is slated to begin construction in 2029.

== Ownership and management ==
As a public service company, GRTC is owned equally by the City of Richmond and neighboring Chesterfield County. Henrico and Hanover counties currently purchase services from it, but hold no ownership interest.

Immediately after GRTC was formed in 1973, American Transportation Enterprises, Inc., through a subsidiary, continued to provide management. It was managed by a private transit management company that provided the CEO, COO, and Transportation Manager, as was its predecessor, Virginia Transit Company.

GRTC itself has about 500 employees including bus operators, repair shop mechanics, customer service, support, and other administrative staff.

== Fleet ==
Image	Builder and model name	Model year	Length	Numbers (Total)	Amount in service	Energy source	Notes
	Motor Coach Industries; D4500CT	2011	45 ft (14 m)	1504–1508 (5 buses)	4 retiring	Diesel	1504 was listed for auction in August 2024.
	Gillig; BRT CNG	2013	40 ft (12 m)	201–208 (8 buses)	5 retiring	CNG	First CNG buses for GRTC; 206 and 208 are utilized as training buses.; 201-203 are retired.
	Gillig; BRT CNG	2014	40 ft (12 m)	250–270; 501–508 (28 buses)	26	CNG	255 retired due to an accident; 262 Is out of service after being struck by bus 2103 on August 25, 2026, at the Downtown Transfer Station.
	Gillig; BRT CNG	2014	35 ft (11 m)	701–705 (5 buses)	5	CNG	Used on low ridership routes: 18, 20, 76, 77, 78, 79, 86, 87.
	Gillig; BRT CNG	2017	40 ft (12 m)	2101–2110 (10 buses)	9	CNG	2103 Is out of service after striking bus 262 on August 25, 2026, at the Downtown Transfer Station.
	Gillig; BRT CNG	2017	35 ft (11 m)	2121–2124 (4 buses)	4	CNG	
	Gillig; BRT CNG	2017	29 ft (8.8 m)	2131–2134 (4 buses)	4	CNG	Used on low ridership routes: 18, 20.
	Gillig; BRT CNG	2018	40 ft (12 m)	2201–2217 (17 buses)	17	CNG	
	Gillig; BRT CNG	2018	29 ft (8.8 m)	2231–2236 (6 buses)	6	CNG	Used on low ridership routes: 18, 20.
	Gillig; BRT CNG	2021	40 ft (12 m)	2300–2313 (14 buses)	14	CNG	
	Gillig; BRT CNG	2022	40 ft (12 m)	2315–2319 (5 buses)	5	CNG	
	Gillig; BRT CNG	2022	29 ft (8.8 m)	2401–2410 (10 buses)	10	CNG	
	Gillig; BRT CNG	2024	40 ft (12 m)	2320–2333 (14 buses)	14	CNG	
	Gillig; BRT CNG	2024	35 ft (11 m)	2411–2415 (5 buses)	5	CNG	
	Gillig BRT Plus CNG	2016	40 ft (12 m)	2001–2013 (13 buses)	12	CNG	Some used for the Pulse bus rapid transit line; All are expected to be reassigned into local service by the end of 2026.; 2004 was destroyed by rioters on May 29, 2020.; 2012–2013 were reassigned to local & express services in 2026.
	Gillig BRT Plus CNG	2021	40 ft (12 m)	2014 (1 bus)	1	CNG	2014 is a replacement for 2004.; Formerly used for the Pulse bus rapid transit line; reassigned to local service in 2026.
	New Flyer; Xcelsior XN60	2025	60 ft (18 m)	9000–9003 (4 buses)	4	CNG	Used for the Pulse bus rapid transit line; Four units delivered in spring 2025.; Began entering service on September 4, 2025.; Sidelined from October 2025 to March 2026; began reentering service in March 2026.
	New Flyer; Xcelsior XN60	2026	60 ft (18 m)	9004–9011 (8 buses)	4 (of 8)	CNG	Used for the Pulse Bus Rapid Transit line; All units delivered in summer 2026.; Bus 9004 was displayed at GRTC's TAP into Transit event in July 2026.; Began entering service in September 2026.

=== On order ===
Builder and model name	Length	Model year	Numbers (Total)	Energy source	Notes
Motor Coach Industries; D45 CRT LE	45 ft (14 m)	TBD	(5 buses)	Diesel	Expected to replace entire 2011 MCI fleet; Five units expected in mid-2026/early-2027
Gillig 40-foot CNG	40 ft (12 m)	TBD	(17 buses)	CNG	17 buses expected in late-2027/early-2028 to replace the 200-series CNGs.

146 transit vehicles, 96 CARE vehicles, and 27 support vehicles (vans, wreckers, trucks, SUVs, etc.)
139 fixed-route transit vehicles use CNG fuel
88 CARE vehicles use CNG fuel

== CARE and CARE Plus ==
GRTC Transit System's CARE and CARE Plus services provide origin-to-destination service under the guidelines of the Americans with Disabilities Act (ADA) for the citizens of the Richmond Region. CARE and CARE Plus provide public transportation access to individuals with disabilities who may not be reasonably able to use GRTC fixed route bus service. All CARE trips are identified as either CARE or CARE Plus service. CARE and CARE Plus services are available in the City of Richmond, Henrico County, and portions of Chesterfield County.

== Facilities ==
The GRTC Headquarters and bus garage is located near the intersection of Belt Boulevard and Midlothian Turnpike in South Richmond.

== See also ==
- GRTC Pulse
