= Greater Richmond Region water distribution systems =

Provision of water across the region

The Greater Richmond region of Virginia has a collection of multiple infrastructure and government departments that distribute water utility service and drinking water to area residents, industry, and commercial customers.

== State ==
Most funding for water system improvement projects comes from the Virginia Clean Water Revolving Loan Fund, which provides funds for water system quality improvements at a low interest rate.

== Regional ==
=== "Water War" ===
In 1987 the Henrico County Board of Supervisors, wanting to end their reliance on buying water from the independent city of Richmond, decided to construct a water treatment plant at a cost of $70 million, which eventually increased to $86 million. The facility was to be designed such that it could produce 35 million gallons of water a day, with a potential for expansion to 55 million gallons a day.

Richmond was opposed to this idea, as they were expanding their plant at the time from a 96 million gallon a day (MGD) capacity to a 132 MGD capacity, and identified that the plant could be further expanded to produce 150 MGD, which would allow the system to accommodate growth in the entire metropolitan region for the foreseeable future. They argued that any reduction in water sales to Henrico would cause them to lose revenue, which would hamper their ability to expand the plant. The establishment of a new plant, they argued, would also hamper the ability of regional leaders to establish a regional water utility, which would be able to manage, coordinate,a and supply the distribution of water throughout the metropolitan region. Further, they argued that the project would hamper their ability to engage in a massive planned redevelopment of the downtown.

Another point of opposition raised by Richmond city leadership was that the construction of a new water plant further upstream on the James River would drastically reduce and alter the river's flow. The city noted that the U.S. Army Corps of Engineers (USACE) could then limit how much water the city drew into its own plant, which would be even worse for the city. Henrico responded by referencing a study funded by the USACE and prepared by EA Engineering, Science, and Technology, Inc., which said that a Henricoan withdrawal of up to 55 MGD would not substantially alter the river's flow, harm fish populations or habitats, or affect recreational uses. Richmond leaders attacked the validity of the study in response.

Near the end of October 1992, the debate intensified significantly after Richard W. Glover, then-Chairman of the Board of Supervisors, sent a letter to City Council asking that deliberations on the issue become more intentional and conclusive. He charged that the City had increased its charges for water in the 1980s by 175% and that the city was earning an excessive profit of about $3 to $4 million a year on the sale of water to Henrico, which explained the city's reluctance to resolve the dispute. Glover further insinuated that any additional delay could result in the USACE deciding to impose more stringent water intake restrictions on both localities.

Richmond Mayor Walter T. Kenney responded to the letter by saying that the city's profit was only about $350,000, accusing the County of making veiled threats, and saying that the new water plant was not needed and that no new water production facilities would be needed for another 40 years. In response, the Board of Supervisors voted to retain the law firm of Hazel and Thomas to help the county with the water dispute.

A dispute occurred in the Richmond Times-Dispatch, starting in March 1993. An editorial was published arguing that Henrico did not need its own water plant, saying that Richmond's plant expansion would provide the county more water than even the expanded Henrico plant. Then-County Manager Virgil R. Hazelett responded that Henrico's construction of an additional water treatment plant was in line with recommendations made by the Regional Water Resources Plan. He cited the need to provide water during low-flow conditions in the James River and railed against the common perception of Henrico as regionally uncooperative. Another editorial, "The Latest Drop," was published, saying that Henrico's new facility would dramatically harm the city's ability to pursue its riverfront development project. Hazelett responded by saying that the project, especially the portion on the James River and Kanawha Canal, was facing issues for entirely separate reasons, namely that the flow diversion of the James River was very significant and because USACE had found the city's canal improvements to be subject to federal regulations. He said that Henrico's withdrawals would be, at most, 12 percent of all withdrawals from the river. City Manager Robert C. Bobb responded in a letter to the editor, saying that Henrico's construction of a new water plant would unnecessarily cost the region money and would have an overly detrimental impact on the James River.

The Metropolitan Richmond Chamber of Commerce offered to help resolve the dispute. Upon the acceptance of the two localities of the offer, the organization appointed a Technical Committee, composed of prominent area business leaders. The Committee issued a report detailing 4 courses of action, each of which endorsed the County's request to construct and operate its own water treatment plant. A Water Review Panel composed of other prominent area business leaders endorsed the report of the Technical Committee and recommended that several actions be taken, all of which included the construction of a water plant in Henrico. Henrico's leaders endorsed the report's conclusions, whereas those of Richmond continued in their steadfast opposition.

Seeking to keep the dispute out of the public eye, both City Council and the Board of Supervisors authorized Bobb and Hazelett, respectively, to engage in private negotiations regarding the dispute. In May 1994, following a protracted and often contentious series of talks, Bobb and Hazelett issued a 15-point Memorandum of Understanding, mostly resolving the dispute. The Henrico Board of Supervisors endorsed the report, followed by the Richmond City Council. This document formed the basis for the signing of a water agreement between Richmond and Henrico in September 1994.

In the agreement, Henrico agreed to delay the commencement of operations until 2003, in exchange for the city supporting Henrico's facility and its permit application to the USACE to withdraw water from the river. The county also agreed to purchase 25 to 26 MGD from 2003 to 2006, and up to 45 MGD during peak demand periods. From 2006 onward, the county agreed to purchase about 12 MGD, or up to 20 MGD during peak demand periods. The county has the option of purchasing a maximum of 35 MGD, starting in 2006. The county also agreed to support the city's application for permits at various levels of government to redevelop the canal system and downtown riverfront. Additionally, both localities agreed to abide by the James River Management Plan.

In 1996, the USACE granted Henrico the final permit necessary to build the water treatment plant.

==== Final water purchasing contract ====
In 2023, Henrico purchased about 11 million gallons of water a day from the city, at a cost of about $15 million. It has purchased roughly $20 million worth of water from the city since 2019. The county is the city's largest water customer. The contract that allowed for this was made in 1994 and runs through 2040. It absolves both parties of responsibility for a variety of issues, but not negligence. The agreement is designed to remain in force, even if a certain provision is no longer in force. Any change after 2040 would require a 5-year notice period.

=== 1994 proposal ===
In 1994, a proposal to regionalize water, sewer, trash, and transportation services in Henrico, Chesterfield, and Richmond was put up for a vote in the three localities. The counties didn't want to bail out the city, while the city didn't want to lose control; the measure failed. A survey had found around 40% support for the idea.

== Richmond ==
The city reservoir is typically at about 18 feet and is located near Byrd Park. There are additional tanks, one of which is called the Cofer Road tank and one of which is called the Ginter Park tank. The Ginter Park tank is smaller than the rest.

The city maintains around 1200 miles of water lines.

The Richmond Department of Public Utilities, which is responsible for the water system, was already involved in customer service and billing issues before the outage. Its working environment was described as being a "culture of complacency," where officials were aware of issues, including broken or substandard systems, but normalized working around the issues, rather than trying to fix them. Training and standard operating procedures were limited, along with proactive planning and staffing.

Before the crisis, DPU did not regularly participate in tabletop planning scenarios, except for participating sometimes with the fire department's sessions. DPU emergency plans were being updated every 5 years before the crisis, which is the minimum recommended by the EPA. The city uses WebEOC, an emergency communications platform, to manage its response to crises. The city did not regularly meet with regional partners to discuss the state of the water treatment plant, nor did it have an "asset management plan" to maintain water infrastructure equipment.

Political strategist Paul Goldman argued that Richmond city leaders cut back on infrastructure spending in the 1980s, as city revenues decreased. A return to increased spending was promised, but never realized, by many in the following decades. Douglas Wilder tried to modernize the city's infrastructure, but political issues got in the way. Goldman argues that Mayor Dwight Jones and Levar Stoney played the race card to the city's detriment, especially the detriment of its infrastructure; and that the focus on Stoney's proposed sports arena happened at the detriment of the city's infrastructure.

When she took the role in 2021, Richmond Department of Public Utilities (DPU) Director April Bingham stated that she inherited a lot of problems at DPU, including those related to customer service, lead service lines, natural gas, storm water, and combined sewer overflows, and that the water plant was not her top priority. Her salary in 2023 was $217,739. She did not hold an engineering degree, unlike the DPU directors in the surrounding counties and her predecessor and replacement; rather, her career was focused on customer service, first in Washington, DC, and then Richmond. She holds a Bachelor's in Business Administration from the University of Mary Washington and a Master's in Public Administration from the University of Phoenix.

It was found that Bingham did not regularly communicate with Henrico's DPU director. In all of 2024, only one meeting was held with the city's major water customers, Hanover, Chesterfield, and Henrico.

The city fluoridates its water, with a target of 0.7 mg/L; the Maximum Contamination Limit (MCL) allowed by the EPA is 4.0 mg/L. The EPA requires waterworks to provide a special notice to customers when fluoride levels pass the secondary MCL of 2.0 mg/L. At levels higher than that, children under 9 can develop cosmetic discoloration of their adult teeth, called dental fluorosis. The city also chlorinates its water.

The employees of the plant are represented by the Teamsters Union.

Since 2023, Levar Stoney's administration spent almost $100,000 on traditional and digital billboards advertising City of Richmond drinking water and saying that it was "Clean, Safe, [and] Reliable." Lamar, which operates the billboards, mistakenly put the ads up during the January and May water crisis, months after new ads from DPU about lead service lines, natural gas safety, and available financial assistance were supposed to have been displayed.

When the city shut down its water plant, the counties are generally notified the reason why and for how long the shutdown was expected to last.

=== History ===
In the 1980s, the city asked state regulators to allow them to double the amount of water the treatment plant took in, which was approved in 1996. This raised the risks of a catastrophic flooding event.

In the wake of Hurricane Isabel in 2003, then-Governor Mark Warner expressed his displeasure with the state's lack of backup generator capacity in its water systems. Richmond's estimated $48 million cost was said to be too expensive, but in 2005 Mayor Wilder began a $17 million project to install reliable generators at the water plant, a project completed by Mayor Jones.

=== Payment In Lieu Of Taxes (PILOT) ===
The city had been diverting funds for the plant towards its general fund since at least 2006. These transfers were made as payment-in-lieu-of-taxes (PILOT) payments, where the water authority paid the city the amount that it would in taxes if it were privately owned.

The chair of the Richmond Utilities Commission asserted that these payments were basically an additional, hidden tax on Richmonders. He pushed for it to be clearly marked on peoples' bills, and said that the hidden tax wasn't progressive; he argued that the payments were being used to cover expenses in the general fund that would otherwise be covered by a more progressive taxation system. This is because paying for utilities isn't optional and the utilities, although independent financial entities, are backed by Richmond taxpayers. The city responded that their charter allows them to charge this revenue. Further, the city is not unique in making these transfers, as opposed to operating their utilities as true profit-neutral enterprises.

=== Rate increase ===
In their March 2023 presentation on raising the rates for FY 2024, the city said that rate increases were needed to cover operations & maintenance, debt service, PILOT, internal service costs, dividend payments to the general fund, and pas-as-you-go capital contributions. It cited increasingly stringent regulations from VDH and EPA; aging infrastructure, given that some of Richmond's system is over 100 years old and $680 million would be needed for water infrastructure repair and replacement; and declining per-capita consumption, given that the majority of DPU's costs are fixed, as reasons for the rate increase in 2024. They planned $375 million in capital upgrades from 2024 to 2028.

The chair of the Commission also said that DPU needed a much higher level of scrutiny when raising rates, given that they didn't address their lack of reinvestment in their infrastructure or a drop in per-capita consumption when they raised their rates in 2024.

=== Douglasdale Road Water Treatment Facility ===
The water plant on Douglasdale Road was built in 1924, and the other in 1950. The age of the system, and that of the plant specifically, is very apparent, according to Dwayne Roadcap, director of the Virginia Department of Health. The plant is a key water source for the region.

Although it has the capacity to produce up to 132 million gallons a day, on a typical winter day, the plant produces 45 million gallons per day, when usage is lower. Water flow from the James River into the plant is made possible by gravity, as some portions are located underground. To prevent flooding, this water needs to be pumped out as fast as the James River pushes it in. The plant's clearwells, where finished water is stored before being distributed, are also located in the basement, and are enclosed by a flood wall. More modern designs include overflow valves for these, but the Richmond facility did not have that. This makes the facility's pumping, electrical, and computer systems critical to the safe operation of the plant and the prevention of basement flooding.

The facility has two halves, called Plants 1 and 2, and four filtration basins. Part of the filtration system is composed of plate settlers, which take out bigger particles. Part of this process involves the use of a material called alum to clump together the bigger particles, which are then caught by the plate settlers. This material can create a sludge that needs to periodically cleaned off the filters.

Before the crisis, the plant operated in "Winter Mode" during the winter, relying on one power source at a time and a critical single piece of equipment, called a bus tie, to switch between power sources, rather than being continuously connected to both sources at all times, as it is when operating in "Summer Mode." The primary wintertime power source also came from overhead power lines.

It has a primary and secondary source of Dominion power (Main Feeder 1 and 2) as well as generators. Switching between the primary and secondary source requires a switchgear, which failed on January 6. It had not been replaced in two decades, and the city, starting in 2016, had put out three solicitations for bids to upgrade it. The generators are intended to operate the plant at 50% capacity, and include two 45 kW generators intended to keep the basement dry to prevent the sensitive electronic equipment there from getting dry. The generators were purchased in the wake of Hurricane Isabel. It is unclear how much time it takes to start the generators, with city staff responses ranging from 5 to 45 minutes.

The facility is operated by a General Electric-built SCADA system, which runs off main electrical power but can also run from backup generators or Uninterruptible Power Supply (UPS) batteries, which were designed for up to an hour of operation at most.

==== 2020s flooding ====
Some amount of flooding in the basement was common before the crisis, and this type of flooding had previously shut down water production for periods up to 6 hours. The city had assumed that those events were normal due to the plant's design and age. It was found that specific flooding events in 2020 and 2021 could have caused similar failures as the 2025 one, but that the state was not notified when those occurred. The filter gallery valves in the basement were intended to remove any flooding water, but are inefficient to manually operate because there are 22 valves that take time to operate by hand, and because it is dangerous to manually operate them when the basement is flooded. Further, their placement is such that water released from the valves can quickly come back into the basement due to the outflow being near the intake point.

=== 2022 EPA report and response ===
A 2022 report by the Environmental Protection Agency (EPA) uncovered problems with Richmond's water distribution system. Their visit to the plant was announced about a month beforehand, and they visited along with ODW. The report showed multiple issues across the water system, including at the plant, at the reservoir, and in the pipes themselves. The report specifically identified issues with irregular inspections, limited preventative and corrective maintenance, and aged equipment. It pointed to a lack of an asset management plan for rusting valves, chemical leaks, and malfunctioning meters. Bingham was not present at the inspection, although she said that if she had been informed of its importance that she would have been there.

The Richmond Department of Public Utilities responded to the report on January 3, two days before the plant's failure. CBS 6 News pointed out that the city's response was delayed by roughly 2 years, but a Department of Public Utilities spokesperson said that they were not presented with the findings until August 2024. Bingham later said that she did not know about the report until October 11, 2024, and was surprised about how long it had taken to reach her desk. The response, by Bingham, an appointee of Mayor Levar Stoney, laid out corrective measures; it also said that redundancy was a key feature of their system and allowed the system to continue operating even in the case of certain components failing. Their response noted that they would address cracked and corroded equipment with refurbishment and a larger capital improvement project; the department also noted that its emergency response plan was outdated and that a new plan would be completed in early 2025. The emergency response plan had not been updated since 2017.

The HNTB report said that poor communication between plant personnel and DPU administrators hindered the ability of the department to effectively respond to the EPA report.

=== Natural springs ===
There are many natural springs in the city, at least 12 of which have been documented, which formerly provided drinkable water for the surrounding neighborhoods. The springs, except Wayside Spring, which is still open, have all been closed for various reasons. Some of the spring closures were attributable to E. coli and other contaminants. Many are located in public parks owned by the city. Before their closure, city residents were able to use them as a source of water if the city cut off their water.

Additionally, the state used to fund a water-testing program for the springs, but that was defunded, and the city was unable or unwilling to test the water themselves and incur the related costs. The government posted signs saying that the water was unsafe, but it still may have been perfectly safe. However, Roadcap says that testing in the early 1980s that identified coliforms, bacteria not harmful in and of themselves but considered by the EPA to be good indicators of bacteria that can cause gastrointestinal illnesses, may have led the city to remove spring access. He stated that much expenditure would have been required to keep the spring water safe for consumption.

=== Richmond Utilities Commission ===
Former City Councilor Andreas Addison proposed a Richmond Utilities Commission in late 2023 to serve in an advisory role to the Mayor and city government regarding city-operated utilities, as well as an educational role for city residents and other ratepayers. Addison initially viewed the Commission as having more power, but could not get the backing to create anything more than an advisory group. The body's newness; minimal power; alleged under-funding by City Council; and lack of mayoral appointments, leading to many failures to make quorum since the body's inception, have made it difficult for much to be accomplished.

== Henrico ==
The county's water system serves about 92,000 customers and about 1,570 miles of water mains. Much of the pipe system in Henrico was built in the 1950s and 1960s, much of which was coming back around for replacement as of 2018. Both cold winter weather and deterioration over time can cause water main breaks.

Henrico's water system is divided into multiple pressure zones that have interconnecting pipes. These include the Greater Hermitage Zone, Laburnum/Azalea Zone, and Greater Eubank Zone (which encompasses much of the Varina district). The Greater Hermitage Zone is fed directly from the water treatment facility by a 42-inch pipe. The Greater Hermitage Zone and Laburnum/Azalea Zone have multiple interconnections. The Laburnum/Azalea Zone and Greater Eubank Zone are interconnected with a single 16-inch pipe. Normally, the Greater Eubank Zone and Laburnum/Azalea Zone are fed from Richmond's water treatment plant with large pipes, and Henrico only supplements that water every three days with water from its own plants. Typically, Henrico receives about 12 million gallons a day from the city. The county has six tanks that serve Eastern and Northern Henrico. The county's Cox Road tank holds 2 million gallons of water; it and the Eubank tank near the airport these tanks are designed to serve higher-elevation areas.

The city generally provides about 11 million gallons a day of water to the county; Henrico County is the city's chief customer, and the city is the county's chief water provider. The city's Church Hill water tanks serve the Elko area of Eastern Henrico. Essentially, the county serves everything west of Interstate 95 with its own Water Treatment Plant.

The county has been investing in its long-term water supply with the Virgil R. Hazelett Reservoir at Cobbs Creek project, located in Cumberland County; the project is named after former county manager Virgil R. Hazelett, who negotiated the city-county water contract's terms.

Henrico's water main on Staples Mill Road (Route 33) dates to the 1950s, and had had emergency repairs completed on it many times in the 18 months before the outage. During these repairs, officials were able to replace leaking valves and install new valves, better allowing them to close off sections of the pipe if necessary.

Director of Henrico Public Utilities Bentley Chan said that the idea of moving the entire county to its own system, not just the West End, had been considered for years. Data center developments had already prompted East End water infrastructure upgrades.

Henrico currently sells some water to Hanover (via Route 33) and Goochland counties from its water production plant. The counties of New Kent, Charles City, and Powhatan have all expressed interest in buying water from the county, and Hanover County has expressed interest in receiving more water from the county.

In 2025, the county's won "Best of the Best" in the Water Taste Test competition at the American Water Works Association.

=== History ===
By the 1920s, population growth in the county's north and west had prompted calls for greater service delivery in those areas by the county. In 1927, the Board of Supervisors rejected calls to incorporate the Tuckahoe District's Westhampton area, finding that most citizens within and around the area did not want to incorporate, and instead received authority from the General Assembly to establish Sanitation District No. 1, which, apart from water service, also included sewage, streetlight, and gas systems. They entered into a contract with the city to purchase water and spent money on an engineer to build the set of systems. Other sanitary districts were soon established, but were often later reduced in size due to increases in population density.

The Board of Supervisors established zoning and permitting processes to guide construction within the zones, and soon found itself unable to cope from a governance and fiscal standpoint with the increasing demands of administering the programs. Part of the issues with costs were found to be due to financial mismanagement, especially on the part of the Board of Supervisors. Considering the financial mismanagement and increasing administrative needs, the Board chose to adopt a County Manager form of government in 1934, thanks to the General Assembly's passing of a law and citizen advocacy in favor of the new style of government.

=== Water treatment plant ===
Henrico's Water Treatment Facility is located on Three Chopt and Gaskins Road, and was opened in 2004. Before its construction, Henrico had gotten all of its water from the city. While it was not designed to provide water to the entire county, it is equipped to provide about 80 million gallons of water a day, compared to its current production level of about 23 million gallons in 2023.

The facility's raw water intake is located south of Gaskins Road. It takes water 16 hours to travel the 5 miles to the plant, where it then takes a drop of water 8-14 hours to travel through the plant. The plant operates 24 hours a day, with demand peaking during the morning and afternoon rush hours; the facility operates at a higher level during these time periods. It takes roughly 3 days for water to move through the system to the wastewater treatment facility in the East End, where it takes about 12 hours for water to move through the facility. The facility is about 2 miles from the James River, and the discharge location for the water is under the Varina-Enon bridge. The water released is almost to drinking-water quality standard.

The water produced by the facility exceeds national safe drinking water standards. The facility is a conventional chemical-based water treatment plant, with the addition of an ozone-based process. After the addition of a chemical to remove sediments in the sedimentation basin, the ozone serves as a primary disinfection process. The water goes through a series of filters, which get backwashed. Some chemicals are added to the water before its distribution.

The facility's computer-management system is augmented by physical tests.

== Chesterfield ==
Chesterfield sources water from the Lake Chesdin, the James River, and the Swift Creek Reservoir. The Lake Chesdin Source comes from the Appomattox River Water Authority, and serves much of the southeastern portion of the county. The James River source comes from the City of Richmond's Water Treatment Plant and serves two distinct areas in the northern portion of the county. Between these two areas is a zone served by the Swift Creek Reservoir and Addison Evans Water Treatment Plant; much of this zone is also served by Lake Chesdin, but two parts on its eastern and western extremes are served solely by the Reservoir.

The county expanded its capacity and invested in generators at its plants and pumping stations in the wake of Hurricane Isabel. Normally, Chesterfield receives about 20% of its water from the city via 3 interconnection points.

Overall, the county has 123,000 water customers. About 27 Chesterfield residents receive their water directly from the city. They are unable to be connected to county water due to pressure and geographic constraints.

Chesterfield is planning the construction of a fourth water plant, expressing that difficulties getting permits with the Army Corps of Engineers had made the permitting process alone take five and a half years, at a cost of $2.6 million.

== Hanover ==
Hanover serves the Suburban Service Area, which includes the Hanover Courthouse Area and generally areas between Route 1 and Creighton Road; and five residential communities with public water and wastewater systems. The county has about 20,905 water customers, who pay into a Utility Enterprise Fund to fund the system's operations and capital expenses. They are served with 10 potable water wells, a surface water treatment plant (the Doswell Water Treatment Plant), 6 pumping stations, 7 storage facilities, and 431 miles of water pipe. The county has a 13 MGD excess capacity. 2 wells are located in Mechanicsville, one of which is operational; and 3 are in the Hanover Courthouse area. The South Anna Water Treatment Plant, which has a 2 MGD capacity, is not in service and would require extensive work to be returned to operational status.

As of 2006, the county had 93 employees in its Department of Public Utilities.

Hanover County's 25-year plan does include provisions to construct its own reservoir and an additional water treatment plant, although the County and the City would continue to remain partners.

=== Sources ===
The Doswell Plant is interconnected with the Suburban Service Area, increasing cost effectiveness, efficiency, and flexibility. However, the Suburban Service Area is primarily served by Richmond City.

Hanover has purchased water from the city since 1994; city water primarily serves the Hanover Air Park and Mechanicsville, which are part of the Suburban Service Area. City water is one of the county's water system's 3 sources, and the county receives 20 MGD from that source, an increase from 15 MGD in 2006.

The Doswell and Ashland areas are served by the Doswell Water Treatment Plant, which has a 4 MGD capacity and pulls from the North Anna river. Major customers include the Bear Island Paper Company, Kings Dominion, and the Doswell power plant.

Hanover also buys 0.7 MGD from Henrico, whose water connection runs along Route 1 and is used to provide water to the Tyson Foods plant and a limited number of other users. The County is also connected to Henrico at a connection near Route 1, which is not used routinely. The county has purchased water from Henrico since 1974.

Aqua Virginia serves some customers in Hanover, and Hanover Public schools operate certain individual water systems to serve 3 elementary schools.

== Powhatan ==
The City of Richmond provides some water to Powhatan via a wholesale agreement.

== Aqua Virginia ==
Aqua Virginia is a Virginia State Corporation Commission-regulated water utility that provides water service to residents of Hanover and Goochland counties, among others. As of 2006, 2500 customers in Hanover were served by this utility.

== Appomattox River Water Authority ==
The Appomattox River Water Authority provides water to the counties of Chesterfield, Dinwiddie and Prince George, and the cities of Petersburg and Colonial Heights.

In Chesterfield, the Brasfield Dam forms the Chesdin Reservoir from part of the Appomattox River. In 1968, the reservoir was estimated to hold 12 billion gallons of water, while in 2011, an updated bathymetric survey was completed, which found that the reservoir was now only able to hold 9.3 billion gallons of water.
