= Richmond Railway =

Richmond Railway may refer to:

- The Richmond Railway in south west London, England in 1846-1847, part of the Windsor lines of the London and South Western Railway
- Richmond railway line in Sydney, Australia from 1864
- Richmond Railway (Richmond, Virginia), USA, 1860 - 1881
- Richmond Union Passenger Railway, a street running trolley service in Richmond, Virginia, USA, 1888 - 1949
