= Staples Mill station =

Staples Mill station may refer to either of two transport facilities in Richmond, Virginia:

- Staples Mill station (GRTC), a Greater Richmond Transit Company bus rapid transit stop
- Richmond Staples Mill Road station, an Amtrak station
