= Isabel Inlet =

Inlet along the Outer Banks of North Carolina, US

Coordinates: 35°13′8″N 75°39′45″W

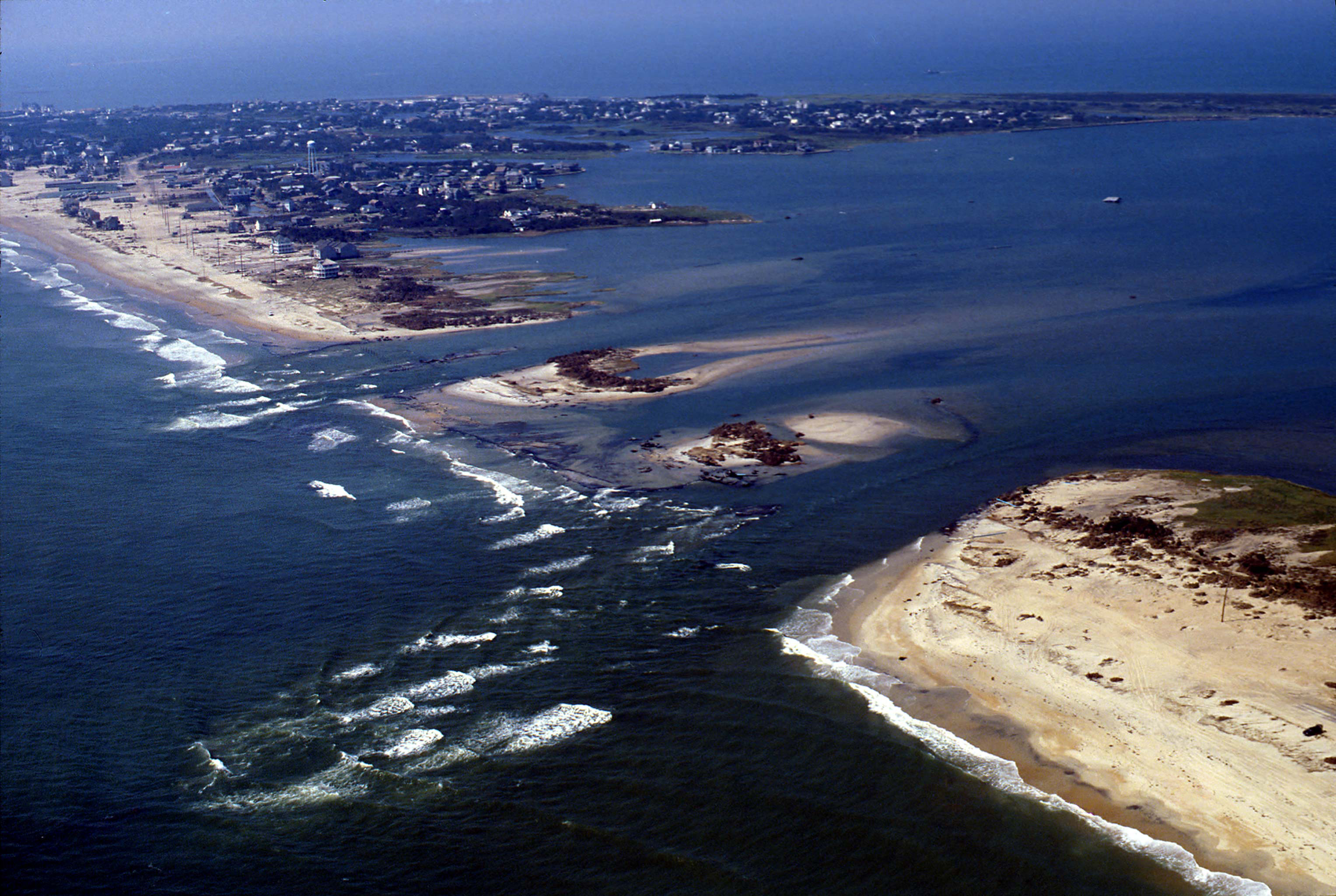
"Isabel Inlet" (USGS)

Isabel Inlet was an informally named inlet along the Outer Banks of North Carolina. It was created by Hurricane Isabel when it swept ashore on September 18, 2003.

Hurricane Isabel's storm surge and waves created the inlet by washing out a portion of Hatteras Island between Hatteras and Frisco. The break was 2,000 feet (600 m) wide and 15 feet (5 m) deep, and consisted of three distinct channels. The formation of the inlet destroyed a portion of North Carolina Highway 12. For the two months it was in existence, Isabel Inlet separated the town of Hatteras from the rest of Hatteras Island. The lower part became known as Little Hatteras Island.

Initially, long-term solutions to the Isabel Inlet such as building a bridge or a ferry system were considered, though they were ultimately canceled in favor of pumping sand and filling the inlet. Coastal geologists were opposed to the solution, stating the evolution of the Outer Banks is dependent on inlets from hurricanes. Dredging operations began on October 17, about a month after the hurricane struck. The United States Army Corps of Engineers used sand from the ferry channel to the southwest of Hatteras Island, a choice made to minimize impact to submerged aquatic vegetation and due to the channel being filled somewhat during the hurricane. On November 22, about two months after the hurricane struck, Highway 12 and Hatteras Island were reopened to public access. On the same day, the ferry between Hatteras and Ocracoke was reopened. The breach on the southern end of Hatteras Island was filled in with sand, as well.
