= GRTC Pulse =

Bus rapid transit line in Richmond, Virginia, US

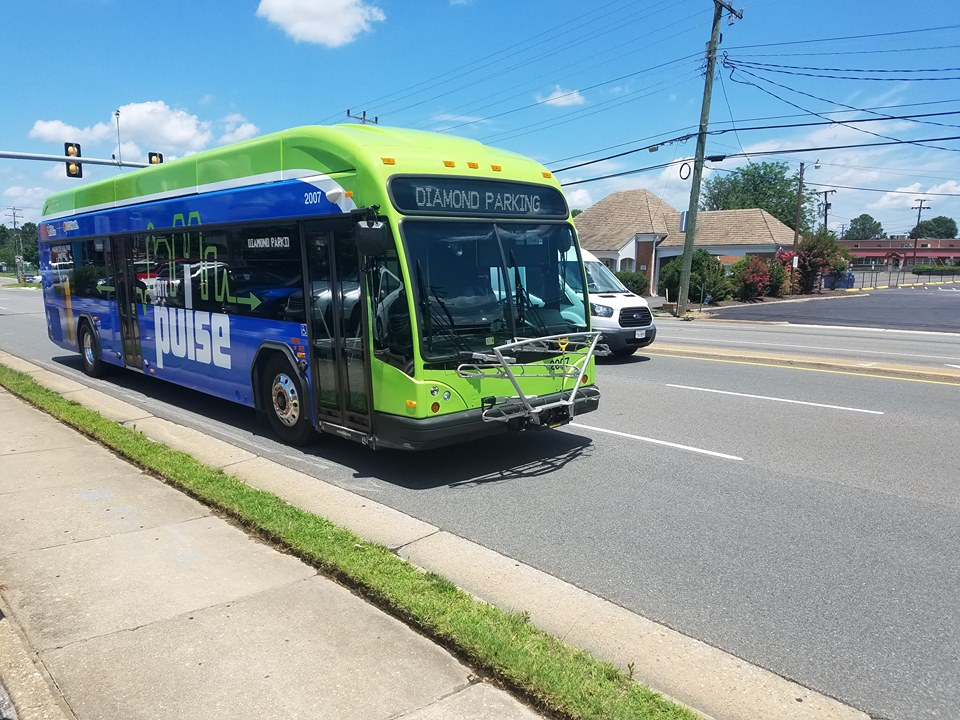
- GRTC Pulse bus in 2018

Overview
- System: Greater Richmond Transit Company
- Vehicle: Gillig BRT Plus CNG; New Flyer XN60
- Began service: June 24, 2018

Routes
- Routes: 1
- Locale: Richmond, Virginia
- Start: Willow Lawn
- End: Rocketts Landing
- Length: 6.8 mi (11 km)
- Stations: 14

Service
- Ridership: 2,015,685 (FY 2025)

The GRTC Pulse, often abbreviated as The Pulse, is a bus rapid transit line in Richmond, Virginia, United States, operated by the Greater Richmond Transit Company. The line runs along Broad Street and Main Street in central Richmond, between The Shops at Willow Lawn and Rockett's Landing. It opened on June 24, 2018, and is the third bus rapid transit service to be constructed in Virginia. The Pulse is the first regional rapid transit system to serve Richmond since 1949. The Institute for Transportation and Development Policy (ITDP), under its BRT Standard, has given the Pulse corridor a Bronze ranking.

== History ==
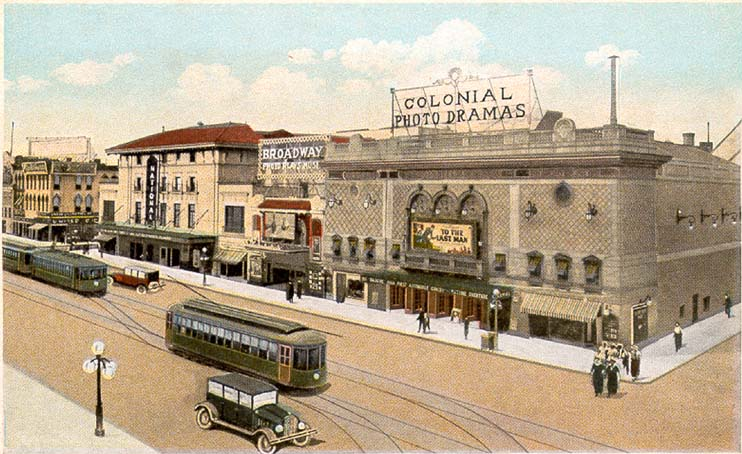
Richmond Union Passenger Railway was Richmond, Virginia's first notable mass transit system.

Before the bus rapid transit system, the city was served by conventional buses operated by the Greater Richmond Transit Company. Bus service in the city began on February 1, 1923, and replaced the city's streetcar system when it ceased operations in 1949. From 1888 until 1949, the city was also served by streetcars via the Richmond Union Passenger Railway.

Original plans for rapid transit in Richmond originated as early as the 1990s, with case studies for light rail and bus rapid transit being studied by the City of Richmond. In 2003, Richmond's Department of Transportation conducted a two-year feasibility study on commuter and light rail in the Greater Richmond Region. The studies found that the lines would be moderately successful, but population in Richmond was not dense enough to demand either said service. Since the studies, other independent groups have begun their own series of studies given Richmond's higher than expected population growth and the region's expected population growth.

In 2010, formal studies began to test the feasibility of a bus rapid transit line, rather than light rail line. The decision to pursue BRT rather than LRT prompted mostly negative reactions from the community, who primarily preferred light rail over bus rapid transit. The Greater Richmond Transit Company has remained open about upgrade the Pulse's initial line to a light rail line in the foreseeable future, should ridership dictate capacity beyond that a BRT system. Feasibility studies, stakeholder analysis, alternative assessments, and environmental impact studies, research was complete in mid-2014.

In late 2014, GRTC unveiled the first set of bus rapid transit plans, which involved several stations stretching from Willow Lawn down to Rocketts Landing. The Main Street Station would serve as the central transportation hub for the Pulse, linking the line with Amtrak, Transdominion Express, Megabus and Central Virginia Express.

On March 17, 2015, GRTC announced that the line would be called the Pulse.

The project had an estimated construction cost of $53 million to provide service from Willow Lawn in the west to Rocketts Landing in the east, including fourteen stations and over three miles of dedicated travel lanes. Half of the final design and construction costs came from the federal TIGER grant ($24.9 million). The other half came in the form of a 50% match funded by both state and local sources. The Virginia Department of Rail and Public Transportation (DRPT) provided 34% ($16.9 million) with the remaining 16% provided by the City of Richmond ($7.6 million) and Henrico County ($400,000). Operation of the service was estimated to cost $2.7 million per year. Some of the operating cost would be covered by fares and the remainder to be provided by local funding sources.

In August 2016, construction began on the BRT line with a goal to complete the service by October 2017. The opening was delayed by several months due to difficulty in relocating utility lines at the stations. The Pulse began service on June 24, 2018. The opening ceremony was attended by the Mayor of Richmond, Virginia, Levar Stoney; the Chairperson of the Henrico County Board of Supervisors, Frank Thorton; and the Governor of Virginia, Ralph Northam. Stoney stated that the $65 million project will generate $1 billion in economic activity over the next 20 years, resulting in a $15 return on investment for every dollar invested.

Within a year of its opening, the line was averaging around 7,000 daily riders – over double its initially projected ridership.

In 2023, it was announced that GRTC would purchase four 60-foot (18 m) New Flyer XN60 articulated buses to relieve congestion on the route. GRTC plans to eventually replace all of the 40-foot (12 m) buses used on the Pulse with XN60 buses. The new buses were scheduled to go into service in 2025. The buses entered service on July 8th, 2025.

== Service ==
The Pulse runs along U.S. Route 250 (Broad Street) before shifting south to Main Street downtown via 14th Street. The initial Pulse line links suburban Willow Lawn to Rocketts Landing, both in suburban Henrico, with at least a dozen stations within the city limits of Richmond. During the morning peak, midday, and evening peak on weekdays, buses come to each station every 10 minutes, with off-peak evening and weekend service every 15 minutes and late night service every 30 minutes. In June 2025, service was reduced during weekday middays to 15 minutes and during Sunday middays to 30 minutes.

=== List of stations ===
Stop	Intersection	Area	GRTC bus connections
Willow Lawn	Broad St & Willow Lawn Dr	West End	18, 19, 50, 75, 76, 77, 79, 91
Staples Mill	Broad St & Staples Mill Rd	West End	18, 19, 50, 91
Scott's Addition	Broad St & Cleveland St	Museum/VCU	20, 50
Science Museum	Broad St & Terminal Pl	Museum/VCU	20, 50, 76, 77
Allison Street	Broad St & Allison St	Museum/VCU	50, 76, 77
VCU & VUU	Broad St & Shafer St	Museum/VCU	14, 78
Arts District	Broad St & Adams St	Museum/VCU	3A/3B/3C, 14, 78
Convention Center	Broad St & 4th St	Downtown	1A/1B/1C, 2A/2B/2C, 3A/3B/3C, 12, 14, 78
Government Center	Broad St & 9th St	Downtown	1A/1B/1C, 2A/2B/2C, 5, 12, 14, 23, 26, 27, 28, 29, 56, 64, 82, 95, 102
VCU Medical Center	Broad St & 12th St	Downtown	1A/1B/1C, 2A/2B/2C, 23, 26, 27, 28, 29, 56, 64, 82, 95, 102
Main Street Station	Main St east of I-95	East End	14, 95
Shockoe Bottom	Main St & 24th St	East End	4A/4B, 12, 13, 14
East Riverfront	Main St & Nicholson St	East End	4B
Rocketts Landing	Orleans St & Old Main St	East End	4B

== Proposed expansion ==
In 2022, studies began on a North-South BRT corridor, travelling along U.S 1. In October 2023, the GRTC Board of Directors approved the recommended route for the proposed North-South BRT.

The North-South Pulse project aims to introduce 12 miles of high-capacity rapid transit, connecting northern and southern parts of the Richmond region via downtown. The route will run from Azalea in Henrico County, down U.S. Route 1, through downtown Richmond, and across the 9th Street Bridge to Southside Plaza. It will then continue along Belt Boulevard and the Midlothian Turnpike, terminating at Springline & Stonebridge. Studies on this Bus Rapid Transit (BRT) corridor began in 2022, and by October 2023, the GRTC Board of Directors approved the recommended route. Currently in Phase 2, focusing on station location and environmental assessments, the project is slated to begin construction in 2029.
