= CSS Texas (1865) =

Ironclad of the Confederate States Navy

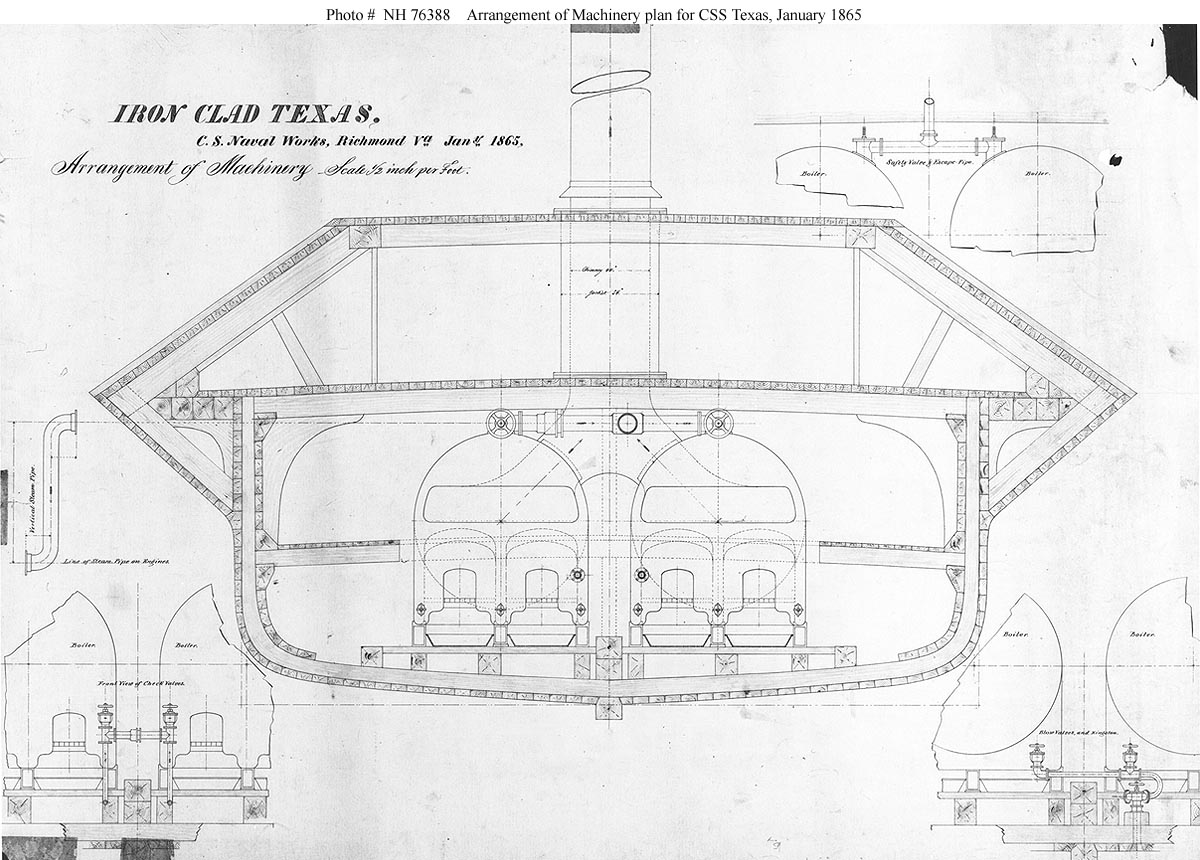
- One of the few surviving plan drawings of ironclad CSS Texas: a cross-section through the boiler area.

History

Confederate States
- Name: Texas
- Namesake: State of Texas
- Builder: Rockets Naval Yard
- Launched: January 1865
- Captured: 4 April 1865
- Fate: Sold, 15 October 1867

General characteristics
- Class & type: Columbia-class casemate ironclad
- Length: 217 ft (66.1 m)
- Beam: 48.5 ft (14.8 m)
- Draft: 13.5 ft (4.1 m)
- Propulsion: steam
- Complement: 50 officers and men
- Armament: two rifled pivot canons, two rifled broadside canons

CSS Texas was the third and last Columbia-class (or Tennessee-class according to some sources) casemate ironclad built for the Confederate Navy during the American Civil War. Not begun until 1864 and intended to become part of the James River Squadron, she saw no action before being captured by Union forces while still fitting out. CSS Texas was reputed to have been one of the very best-constructed Confederate ironclads, second only to CSS Mississippi.

== History ==
Designed by John L. Porter, the Confederacy's chief naval designer, CSS Texas belonged to an 1863/64 class of three ironclads, with CSS Tennessee (1863) (also referred to as the CSS Tennessee II) and CSS Columbia, all three slated to be sister ships. Of the three, only Tennessee was completed and commissioned, proving her mettle in the Battle of Mobile Bay. Columbia was launched but incapacitated while being completed, never seeing operational duty in the Civil War, despite later being captured, repaired, and appraised by the Union Navy.

The keel for CSS Texas was laid down at Rocketts Naval Yard, just outside Richmond, Virginia. She was launched in mid-January 1865, almost at exactly the same time as her unfinished sister ironclad Columbia was crippled beyond salvation. At the time of Robert E. Lee's evacuation of Richmond on 3 April 1865, she was left unfinished but still intact at the Richmond Navy Yard. She was one of only two vessels (the other being the small iron-hulled gunboat CSS Beaufort) which escaped destruction by retreating Confederate forces, because attempts to set her ablaze proved unsuccessful. Captured when Richmond fell the following day, both ironclad and gunboat were appropriated "for use in the Navy", as per Union Admiral David D. Porter (not related to the Texas designer). In his official report of April 12, 1865, Porter mentioned that he was informed that the engines and parts of her armor were not yet installed, residing undamaged but completed in the warehouses of the Richmond naval yard. He subsequently ordered all of it transported to the Norfolk Naval Shipyard, along with the ironclad. This task was begun on 3 May 1865 and completed the following day. Texas was towed downstream by three tugboats, accompanied by Union monitor USS Sangamon, commanded by Lieutenant Commander R. Chandler, who was in charge of the overall operation.

As the war was winding down, and unlike her captured sister ship Tennessee, Texas was not commissioned into the Union Navy. She saw no active service, except for a trial run on 22 June 1865 with her engines apparently installed, the one and only time Texas was known to have sailed under her own power. She was eventually laid up at the Norfolk yard until 15 October 1867, when she was sold at auction for scrapping to J. N. Leonard & Co. of New Haven, Connecticut, having originally cost $218,068 to construct.

== Design ==
The casemate of Texas was roughly octagonal, rather than being a sloped, rectangular, armored box, as on earlier Confederate ironclads and including her class sisters; during construction, it was shortened and reshaped due to critical war materials shortages, accounting for the substantially reduced number of crew needed, when compared to her class sister CSS Tennessee II. The casemate fitted snugly around her eight gun ports, six of which were to be used with two pivot cannons, each one firing from three forward and three aft gun port positions.

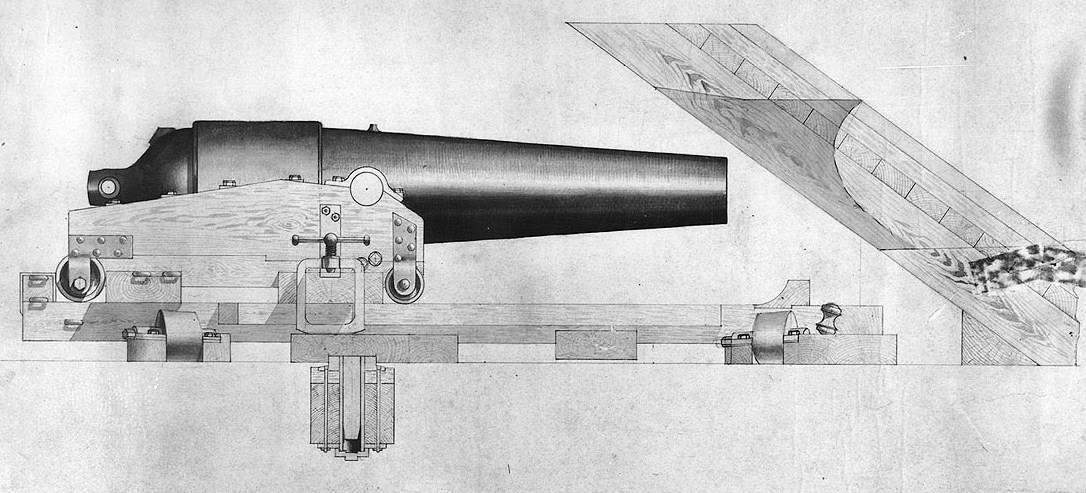
Cannon and pivot carriage mounting plan intended for CSS Texas installation.

Details of her armament are sketchy, but her sister Tennessee II, carried four 6.4-inch (163 mm) Brooke rifles, two 7.0-inch (178 mm) Brooke rifles, and a bolted-on spar torpedo fitted to her bow. Tennessee II's armor was three layers of 2-inch (51 mm) iron plate, and instead of being bolted to her deck, the pilot house formed a seamless extension of her sloped side-armor. Tennessee II's top speed was about 5 knots (9.3 km/h; 5.8 mph), according to some sources, and her crew numbered about 133 sailors. However, it is unclear how closely Texas would have resembled her sister had she been completed, if at all, considering the shortages Texas had to contend with during construction.

Other sources gave Texas a (projected) top speed of about 10 knots (19 km/h; 12 mph). These note that both Tennessee II and Texas differed from each other in their final details due to a lack of available materials, notably the iron plate for her armor; her cannons and engines were also different. During construction, design improvements were also incorporated into Texas from lessons learned in combat with the Union Navy.

Particulars on her dimensions and propulsion, recorded by her Union captors, were later included as a statistical summary in the "Official Records of the Union and Confederate Navies in the War of the Rebellion". It was stated that she measured 217 feet in length, 48.6 feet abeam, and was designed to draw 13 feet of water and 13.6 feet when fully loaded. She was a twin-engined vessel, each driving a separate propeller, powered by two 22'(L)×8.4'(W)×9.1'(H) boilers, heated by a 7'(L)×3.6'(W) furnace, with a grate surface area of 96.8 sq. ft. Recorded is also an appraisal of an inspecting Union officer, who deemed Texas as "(...) one of the best and most valuable hulls built by the Rebels". It was only in this summary that the June 22 trial run was mentioned.

== Popular culture ==
CSS Texas is featured prominently in the feature film Sahara (2005), based on the best-selling novel of the same name by Clive Cussler. In both, a team of treasure hunters search for what was considered by the late 20th century a mythical Civil War-era Confederate ironclad transporting an equally mythical cargo of gold bullion (one more take on the myth of lost "Confederate gold"). In the film's fictionalized version of historical events (and unlike its historical counterpart), CSS Texas, close to completion and under the command of Captain Mason Tombs, made it out of Richmond just before the fall of the city. The ironclad battles through the Union blockade of the James River before disappearing into history. It is carrying what remains of the Confederate treasury's gold bullion, the riches the salvagers are pursuing. The ironclad and its contents (including the mortal remains of its crew that later succumbed to a tropical disease) are discovered a century later. Everything is buried in an old, forgotten, dried up tributary of the Niger River, deep in western Africa (on the highly implausible assumption that an early river ironclad, without masts and long-range sails, could somehow traverse the often violent Atlantic all the way to Africa without a renewable fuel source for its hungry steam boilers and engines). The adventurers manage to reactivate the ironclad's heavy ordinance to fight-off an African warlord and his troops. They succeed in killing him, even though the ironclad's iron plating is heavily bullet-riddled and no match for modern armor-piercing ordnance. Texas and its historic contents are remanded into the custody of the Smithsonian Institution, but not before the adventurers have successfully removed the Confederate bullion to another African location, under the watchful, guarding eyes of others...

In Cussler's novel, CSS Texas is powered by riverboat steam engines that enable her to make a highly unlikely 14 knots. She is armed with four heavy cannon, two Blakely 100-pounders and two 9-inch 68-pounders, which to a certain extent corresponds with what little is known of the historical ship in her final configuration. The film features the ship with more than four guns.

Two recreations of Texas were constructed for the film: a scale shooting model and full-sized exterior and interior sets. Their outer appearances did not correspond with what is known about the historical ironclad; instead, Texas is represented on screen as an amalgam of the original CSS Virginia (of the Battle of Hampton Roads fame) and Porter's original casemate ironclad (co-)design, which he based on his two 150 ft. and 180 ft. standard designs. The Columbia-class was a variant of the latter and both CSS Tennessee and CSS Columbia were built with larger and differently-shaped casemates.

== Sources ==
- Bisbee, Saxon T. (2018). Engines of Rebellion: Confederate Ironclads and Steam Engineering in the American Civil War. Tuscaloosa, Alabama: University of Alabama Press. ISBN 978-0-81731-986-1.
- Canney, Donald L. (2015). The Confederate Steam Navy 1861-1865. Atglen, Pennsylvania: Schiffer Publishing. ISBN 978-0-7643-4824-2.
- Canney, Donald L. (1993). The Old Steam Navy: The Ironclads, 1842–1885. Vol. 2. Annapolis, Maryland: Naval Institute Press. ISBN 0-87021-586-8.
- Gibbons, Tony (1989). Warships and Naval Battles of the US Civil War. Limpsfield, UK: Dragon's World Publishing. ISBN 1-85028-094-0.
- Melton, Maurice (1968). The Confederate Ironclads. South Brunswick, New York: Thomas Yoseloff.
- Konstam, Angus (2001). Confederate Ironclad 1861-65. Wellingborough, UK: Osprey Publishing. ISBN 1-84176-307-1.
- Silverstone, Paul H. (2006). Civil War Navies 1855–1883. The U.S. Navy Warship Series. New York: Routledge. ISBN 0-415-97870-X.
- Silverstone, Paul H. (1984). Directory of the World's Capital Ships. New York: Hippocrene Books. ISBN 0-88254-979-0.
- Still, William N. Jr. (1985) [1971]. Iron Afloat: The Story of the Confederate Armorclads. Columbia, South Carolina: University of South Carolina Press. ISBN 0-87249-454-3.
