= Hurricane Isabel =

Category 5 Atlantic hurricane in 2003

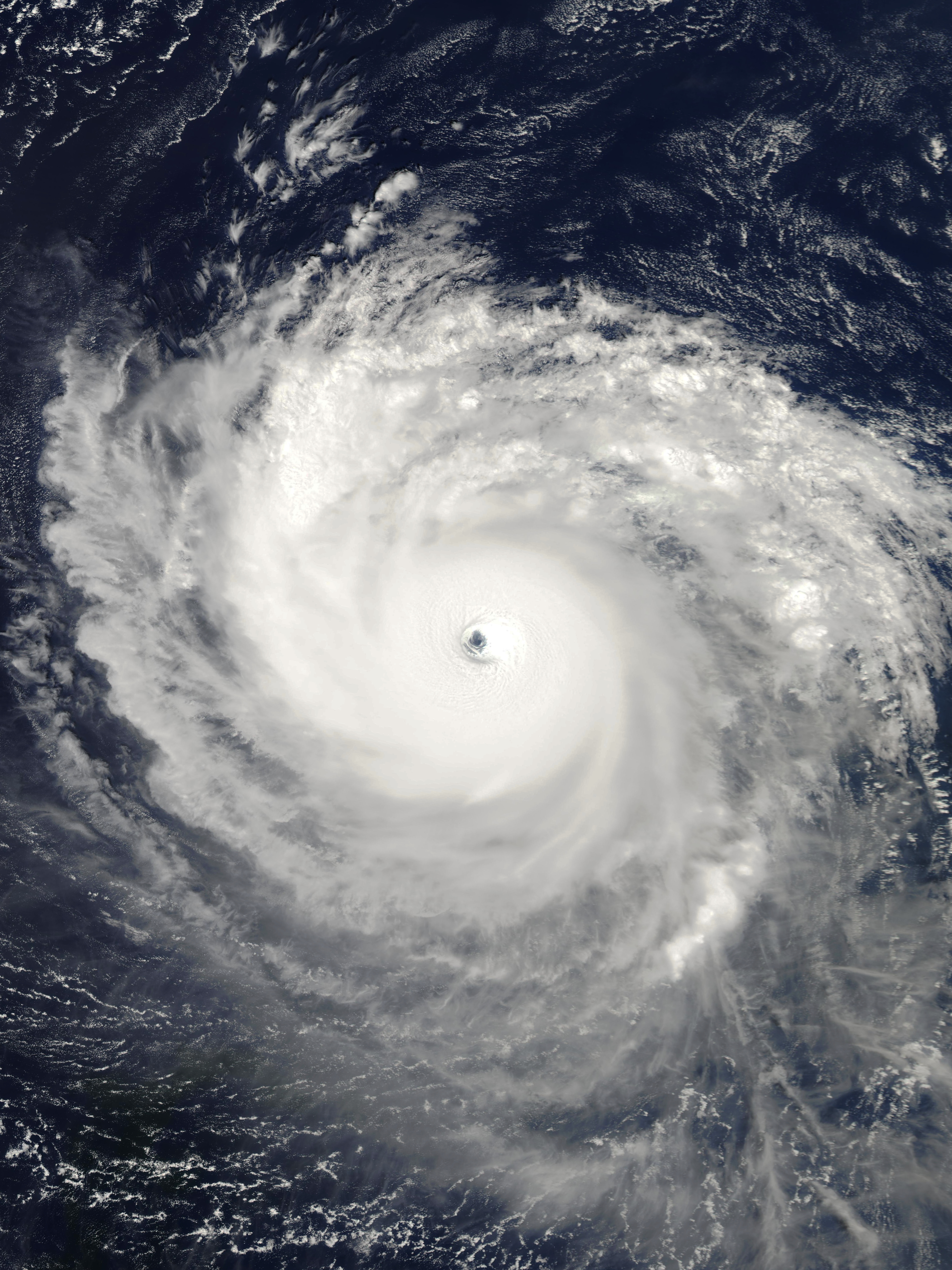
- Isabel at peak intensity, northeast of the Leeward Islands, on September 11

Meteorological history
- Formed: September 6, 2003
- Extratropical: September 19, 2003
- Dissipated: September 20, 2003

Category 5 major hurricane
- 1-minute sustained (SSHWS/NWS)
- Highest winds: 165 mph (270 km/h)
- Lowest pressure: 915 mbar (hPa); 27.02 inHg

Overall effects
- Fatalities: 52 (17 direct, 35 indirect)
- Damage: $3.6 billion (2003 USD)
- Areas affected: Lesser Antilles; Greater Antilles; Lucayan Archipelago; East Coast of the United States; Atlantic Canada
- IBTrACS
- Part of the 2003 Atlantic hurricane season
- Effects: United States; North Carolina; Virginia; Maryland and Washington, D.C.; Delaware; Other wikis: Commons: Isabel images

Hurricane Isabel was a large and powerful Category 5 Atlantic hurricane that struck the east coast of the United States in September 2003. The ninth named storm, fifth hurricane, and second major hurricane of the season, Isabel formed in the eastern Atlantic Ocean on September 6 from a tropical wave. It moved northwestward through an area with light wind shear and warm waters, resulting in strengthening. Isabel reached peak winds of 165 mph (266 km/h) on September 11. After fluctuating in intensity for four days, Isabel gradually weakened and made landfall on the Outer Banks of North Carolina, with winds of 105 mph (169 km/h) on September 18, or a Category 2 on the Saffir-Simpson scale. Isabel quickly weakened over land and became extratropical over western Pennsylvania on the next day. On September 20, the extratropical remnants of Isabel were absorbed into another system over Eastern Canada.

In North Carolina, the storm surge from Isabel washed out a portion of Hatteras Island to form what was unofficially known as Isabel Inlet. Damage was greatest along the Outer Banks, where thousands of homes were damaged or even destroyed. The worst of the effects of Isabel occurred in Virginia, especially in the Hampton Roads area and along the shores of rivers as far west and north as Richmond and Baltimore. Virginia reported the most deaths and damage from the hurricane. About 64% of the damage and 69% of the deaths occurred in North Carolina and Virginia. Electric service was disrupted in areas of Virginia for several days, some more rural areas were without electricity for weeks, and local flooding caused thousands of dollars in damage.

Moderate to severe damage extended up the Atlantic coastline and as far inland as West Virginia. Roughly six million people were left without electric service in the eastern United States from the strong winds of Isabel. Rainfall from the storm extended from South Carolina to Maine, and westward to Michigan. Throughout the path of Isabel, damage totaled about $3.6 billion (2003 USD). 16 deaths in seven U.S. states were directly related to the hurricane, with 35 deaths in six states and one Canadian province indirectly related to the hurricane.

== Meteorological history ==
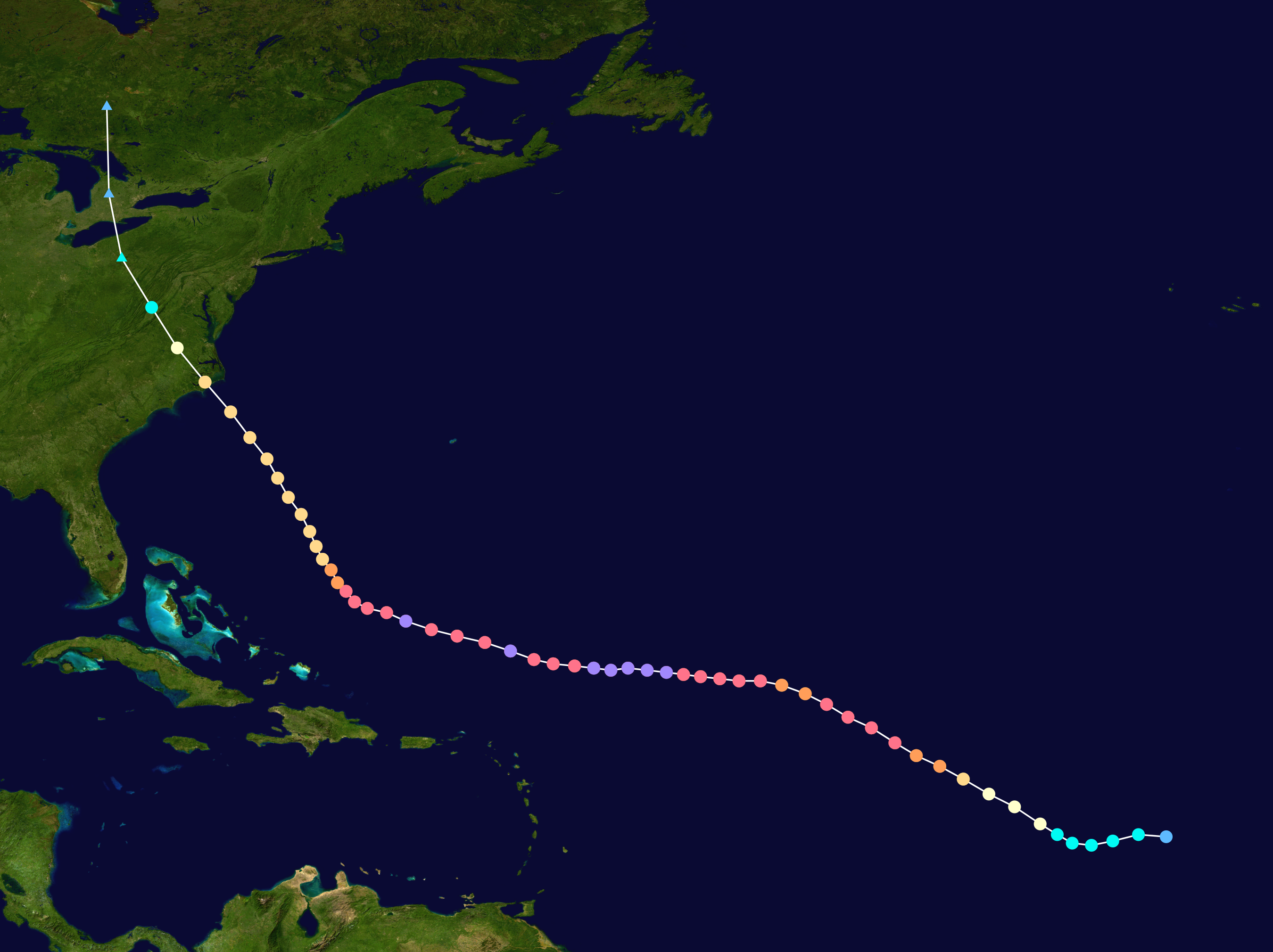
Map plotting the storm's track and intensity, according to the Saffir–Simpson scale Map key Saffir–Simpson scale Tropical depression (≤38 mph, ≤62 km/h) Tropical storm (39–73 mph, 63–118 km/h) Category 1 (74–95 mph, 119–153 km/h) Category 2 (96–110 mph, 154–177 km/h) Category 3 (111–129 mph, 178–208 km/h) Category 4 (130–156 mph, 209–251 km/h) Category 5 (≥157 mph, ≥252 km/h) Unknown Storm type Tropical cyclone Subtropical cyclone Extratropical cyclone, remnant low, tropical disturbance, or monsoon depression

A tropical wave moved off the western coast of Africa on September 1, and continued westward. The system gradually became better organized, and Dvorak classifications began early on September 5. Based on the development of a closed surface circulation, it is estimated the system developed into Tropical Depression Thirteen early on September 6. Hours later, it intensified into Tropical Storm Isabel, the ninth of the season, though operationally the National Hurricane Center did not begin issuing advisories until 13 hours after it first developed. Located within an area of light wind shear and warm waters, Isabel gradually organized as curved bands developed around a circular area of deep convection near the center. It steadily strengthened as it moved to the west-northwest, developing a large ragged eye located near the deepest convection. On September 7, Isabel strengthened into a hurricane, the fifth hurricane of the season.

The eye, overall convective pattern, and outflow steadily improved in organization, and deep convection quickly surrounded the 40-mile (60 km)-wide eye. Isabel intensified on September 8 to reach major hurricane status, or Category 3 status, while located 1,300 miles (2,100 km) east-northeast of Barbuda; this made it the second major hurricane of the season. On September 9, Isabel reached an initial peak intensity of 130 mph (210 km/h) for around 24 hours, a minimal Category 4 hurricane on the Saffir–Simpson Hurricane Scale. Early on September 10, the eyewall became less defined, the convection near the eye became eroded, and northeasterly outflow became slightly restricted. As a result, Isabel weakened slightly to a Category 3 hurricane. The hurricane turned more to the west due to the influence of the Bermuda-Azores High.

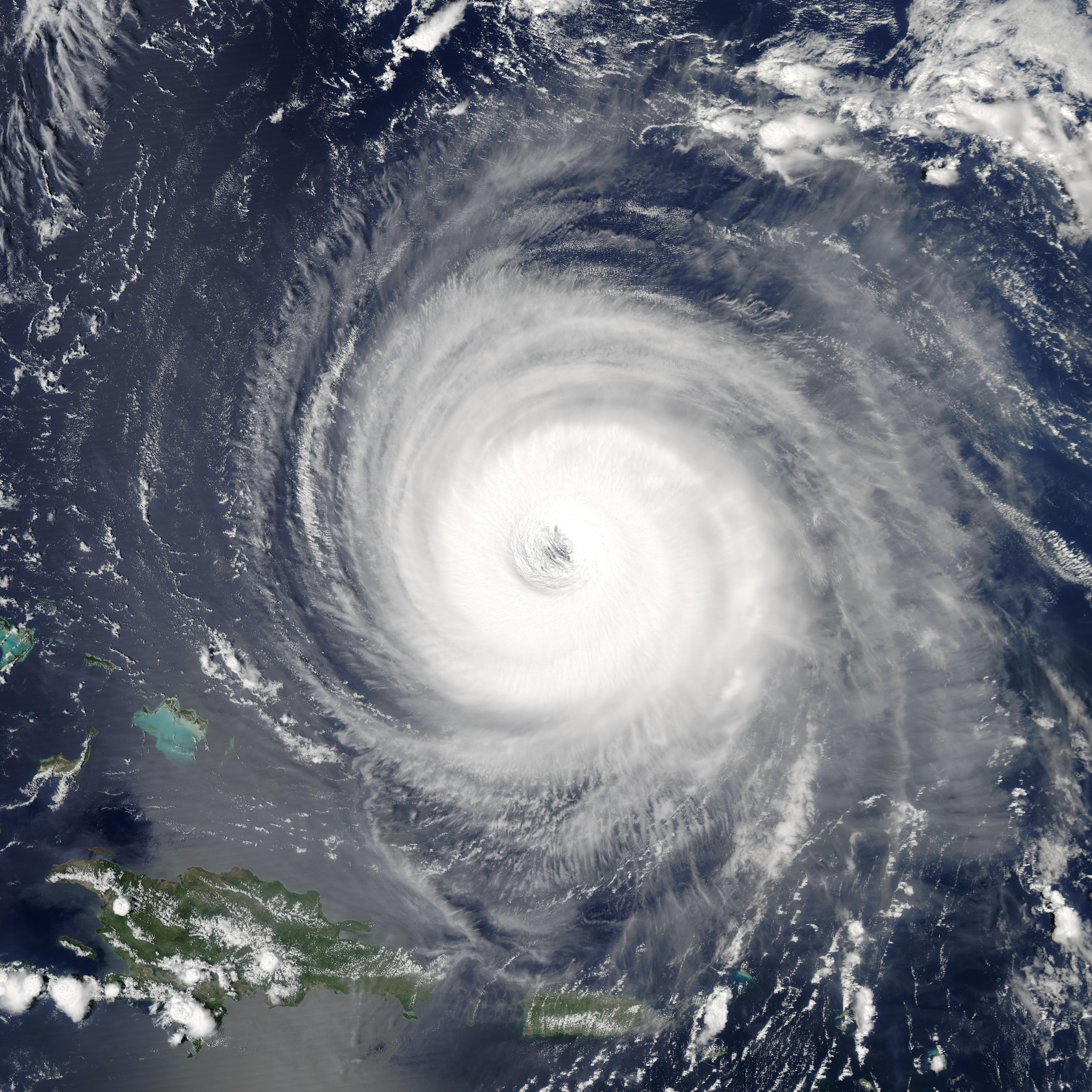
Satellite imagery of Hurricane Isabel displaying annular characteristics on September 14, as a powerful Category 5 hurricane

Late on September 10, Isabel restrengthened to a Category 4 hurricane after convection deepened near the increasingly organizing eyewall. The hurricane continued to intensify, and Isabel reached its peak intensity of 165 mph (266 km/h) and a minimum central pressure of 915 mbar (hPa; 27.02 inHg) on September 11, a Category 5 hurricane on the Saffir–Simpson Hurricane Scale. Due to an eyewall replacement cycle, Isabel weakened slightly, though it retained Category 5 status for 24 hours. As Isabel underwent another eyewall replacement cycle, outflow degraded in appearance and convection around the eye weakened. Early on September 13, Isabel weakened to a strong Category 4 hurricane. After completing the replacement cycle, the hurricane's large 40 miles (64 km) wide eye became better defined, and late on September 13, Isabel re-attained Category 5 status. The hurricane restrengthened despite moving over cooler waters from earlier Hurricane Fabian moving through the same area, partly because of a supply of moist air from its eye. During this time, Isabel attained annular characteristics, becoming highly symmetrical in shape and sporting a wide eye. Hurricane Isabel also displayed a "pinwheel" eye, a rare feature that is found in some annular tropical cyclones. A NOAA Hurricane Hunter Reconnaissance Aircraft flying into the hurricane launched a dropsonde which measured an instantaneous wind speed of 233 mph (375 km/h), the strongest instantaneous wind speed recorded in an Atlantic hurricane. Cloud tops warmed again shortly thereafter, and Isabel weakened to a strong Category 4 hurricane early on September 14. Later that day, it re-organized, and for the third time, Isabel attained Category 5 status while located 400 miles (640 km) north of San Juan, Puerto Rico. By that time, the track had shifted more to the west-northwest.

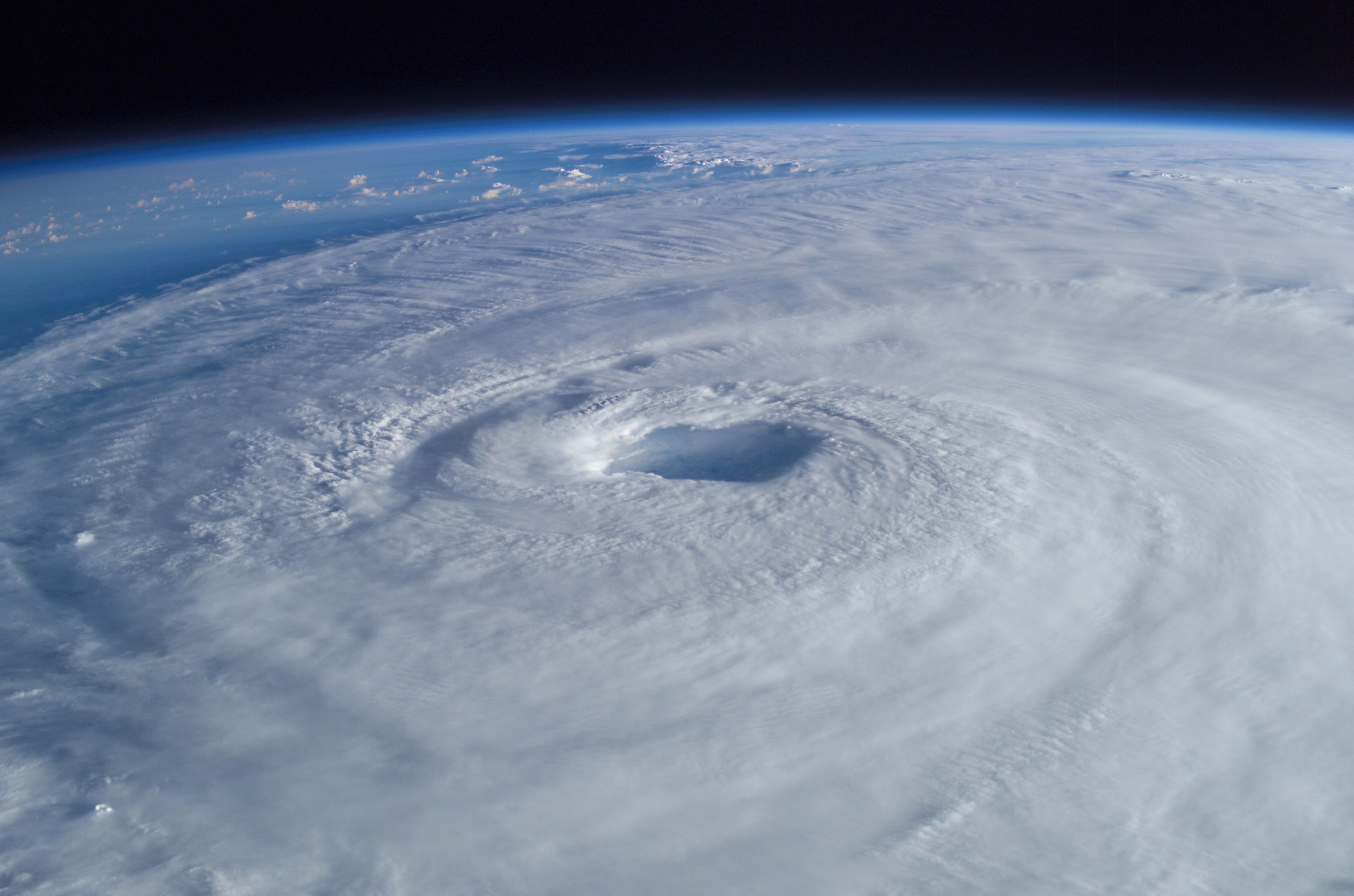
Hurricane Isabel as seen from the International Space Station

Cloud tops around the center warmed again early on September 15, and Isabel weakened to a Category 4 hurricane. Later that day, the inner core of deep convection began to deteriorate, while the eye decayed in appearance. As a ridge to its northwest built southeastward, it resulted in Isabel decelerating as it turned to the north-northwest. Increasing vertical wind shear contributed in weakening the hurricane further, and Isabel weakened to a Category 2 hurricane on September 16, while located 645 miles (1,038 km) southeast of Cape Hatteras, North Carolina. Convection remained minimal, though outflow retained excellent organization, and Isabel remained a Category 2 hurricane for two days, until it made landfall between Cape Lookout and Ocracoke Island on September 18, with winds of 105 mph (169 km/h). Isabel was a large hurricane at landfall, with a windfield of 460 miles (740 kilometres). The system weakened after it made landfall, though due to its fast forward motion, Isabel remained a hurricane until it reached western Virginia, early on September 19. After passing through West Virginia as a tropical storm, Isabel became extratropical over Western Pennsylvania, near Pittsburgh. The system continued turned northward, and crossed Lake Erie into Canada. Early on September 20, the extratropical remnant of Isabel was absorbed by a larger extratropical storm, over the Cochrane District of Ontario.

== Preparations ==
Hurricane Isabel making landfall in North Carolina on September 18

Two days before Isabel made landfall, the National Hurricane Center issued a hurricane watch from Little River, South Carolina to Chincoteague, Virginia, including the Pamlico and Albemarle Sounds and the lower Chesapeake Bay. The NHC also issued a tropical storm watch south of Little River, South Carolina to the mouth of the Santee River, as well as from Chincoteague, Virginia northward to Little Egg Inlet, New Jersey. Hurricane and tropical storm warnings were gradually issued for portions of the East Coast of the United States. By the time Isabel made landfall, a tropical storm warning existed from Chincoteague, Virginia to Fire Island, New York and from Cape Fear, North Carolina to the mouth of the Santee River in South Carolina, and a hurricane warning existed from Chincoteague, Virginia to Cape Fear. Landfall forecasts were very accurate; from three days prior, the average track forecast error for its landfall was only 36 miles (58 km), and for 48 hours in advance the average track error was 18 miles (29 km).

The hurricane's threat prompted various governors to declare states of emergency, including Delaware, Maryland, New Jersey, North Carolina, Pennsylvania, and Virginia. Officials declared mandatory evacuations for 24 counties in North Carolina, Virginia, and Maryland. Roughly half of the Outer Banks left. Hundreds of thousands of people, while more than 12,000 people stayed in emergency shelters.

19 major airports along the East Coast of the United States were closed, with more than 1,500 flights canceled. The Washington Metro and Metrobus system closed prior to the arrival of the storm, and Amtrak canceled nearly all trains south of the nation's capital. Schools and businesses throughout its path closed prior to Isabel's arrival to allow time to prepare; hardware and home improvement stores reported brisk business of plywood, flashlights, batteries, and portable generators, as residents prepared for the storm's potential impact. The federal government was closed excluding emergency staff members. The United States Navy ordered the removal of 40 ships and submarines and dozens of aircraft from naval sites near Norfolk, Virginia.

A contingency plan was established at the Tomb of the Unknowns at Arlington National Cemetery that, should the winds exceed 120 mph (190 km/h), the guards could take positions in the trophy room (above the Tomb Plaza and providing continual sight of the Tomb) but the plan was never implemented. However, it spawned an urban legend that the Third Infantry sent orders to seek shelter, orders that were deliberately disobeyed.

Delaware governor Ruth Ann Minner activated the state National Guard. Across Delaware, 787 people evacuated to one of seven emergency shelters. The Cape May-Lewes Ferry closed for several days in anticipation of the storm. News stations were stationed with crews along the Jersey shore several days in advance of Isabel to provide breaking news and live conditions. Many residents prepared their houses by boarding windows and purchasing emergency supplies. The Sussex County chapter of the American Red Cross advised local high schools to be on stand-by as potential shelters in the event evacuation occurred. Emergency coordinators in several counties were on alert, though none issued evacuations. In preparation for anticipated power outages, the Jersey Central Power and Light company arranged to receive more electrical crews from its parent company, FirstEnergy. Other utility workers from various locations as far as Canada left for the state in the event of power outages. Several flights in and out of the state were delayed or canceled, and the Cape May-Lewes Ferry canceled travel across the Delaware Bay during the duration of Isabel. In Atlantic City, casino workers prepared for coastal flooding by placing sandbags at boardwalk entrances. New Jersey Transit workers secured its buses, railways, and light rail equipment. To ensure service would remain accessible during and after the hurricane, NJ Transit prepared backup generators, pumps, and chainsaws, with workers inspecting trains and the paths of the lines. FEMA mobilized and dispatched an Urban Search and Rescue Task Force of 28 people to the state for possible rescue duty. Days before the storm made landfall, the Salvation Army prepared food and aid for potentially affected citizens.

The threat of the hurricane canceled some flights in and out Pennsylvania. To compensate, Delta Air Lines allowed those flying to or from Philadelphia, Allentown, and Harrisburg to reschedule to a later date. American Airlines offered a similar option. United Airlines and United Express opted to waive charging fees for travelers in and out of the state. The Pennsylvania Emergency Management Agency activated a support team to assist Urban Search and Rescue operations as part of the threat from the storm. The state's National Guard placed 2,990 guardsmen on Emergency Condition 5 status to be deployed anywhere in the state for emergency support, with other guardsmen readying equipment such as generators, heavy trucks, water trailers, and engineer equipment for deployment. State police officers were readied for deployment, while the state health department contacted hospitals to ensure generators were in working condition. The state Environmental Protection Agency prepared for the storm by monitoring the status of all dams, water treatment facilities, and nuclear plants. In addition, the Pennsylvania Turnpike Commission stationed extra workers to patrol the highways in poor drainage areas, with extra equipment prepared for quick response for potential road blockage. Prior to the arrival of the storm, officials from PECO Energy prepared its largest workforce in its history with 1,500 workers, including employees from Commonwealth Edison in Illinois and Detroit Edison.

In New York, Governor George Pataki urged residents to purchase emergency supplies and to fill cars with gasoline. The State Emergency Management Office began preparing for the hurricane about a week before it moved ashore. The office also issued a Level 1 emergency activation, with a planning unit readying contingency plans and in coordinating the efforts of other state offices. The state's National Guard began preliminary preparations for possible support efforts by reviewing the list of personnel able to be mobilized in the event of an emergency. Army and Air National Guard officials identified needed equipment in the event of an emergency, such as helicopters, generators, high-axle vehicles, and communications equipment. State police officers established contingency plans for personnel and equipment to assist as needed. The State Office of Parks, Recreation and Historic Preservation ensured needed equipment were operational, and also secured buildings with sandbags to prevent flooding.

On September 18, the Canadian Hurricane Centre issued heavy rainfall and wind warnings for portions of southern Ontario. A gale warning was also issued for Lake Ontario, eastern Lake Erie, the Saint Lawrence River and Georgian Bay. A news report on September 14 warned conditions could be similar to the disaster caused by Hurricane Hazel 49 years prior, resulting in widespread media coverage on the hurricane. Researchers on a Convair 580 flight studied the structure of Isabel transitioning into an extratropical storm, after two similar studies for Hurricane Michael in 2000 and Tropical Storm Karen in 2001. While flying in a thunderstorm, ice accumulation forced the plane to descend.

== Impact ==
Deaths and damage by region
Region	Deaths		Damage (2003 USD)
Region	Direct	Indirect	Damage (2003 USD)
Florida	1	0	0
North Carolina	1	2	$450 million
Virginia	10	22	>$1.85 billion
West Virginia	0	0	$20 million
Washington, D.C.	0	1	$125 million
Maryland	1	6	$820 million
Delaware	0	0	$40 million
Pennsylvania	0	2	$160 million
New Jersey	2	1	$50 million
New York	1	0	$90 million
Rhode Island	1	0	0
Ontario	0	1	Unknown
Total	17	35	$3.6 billion

Strong winds from Isabel extended from North Carolina to New England and westward to West Virginia. The winds, combined with previous rainfall which moistened the soil, downed many trees and power lines across its path, leaving about 6 million electricity customers without power at some point. Parts of coastal Virginia, especially in the Hampton Roads and Northeast North Carolina areas, were without electricity for almost a month. Coastal areas suffered from waves and its powerful storm surge, with areas in eastern North Carolina and southeast Virginia reporting severe damage from both winds and the storm surge. Throughout its path, Isabel resulted in $5.5 billion in damage (2003 USD) and 51 deaths, of which 17 were directly related to the storm's effects. The governors of Pennsylvania, West Virginia, Maryland, New Jersey, and Delaware declared states of emergency. Isabel was the first major hurricane to threaten the Mid-Atlantic States and the Upper South since Hurricane Floyd in September 1999. Isabel's greatest effect was due to flood damage, the worst in some areas of Virginia since 1972's Hurricane Agnes. More than 60 million people were affected to some degree—a similar number to Floyd but more than any other hurricane in recent memory.

=== Caribbean and Southeast United States ===
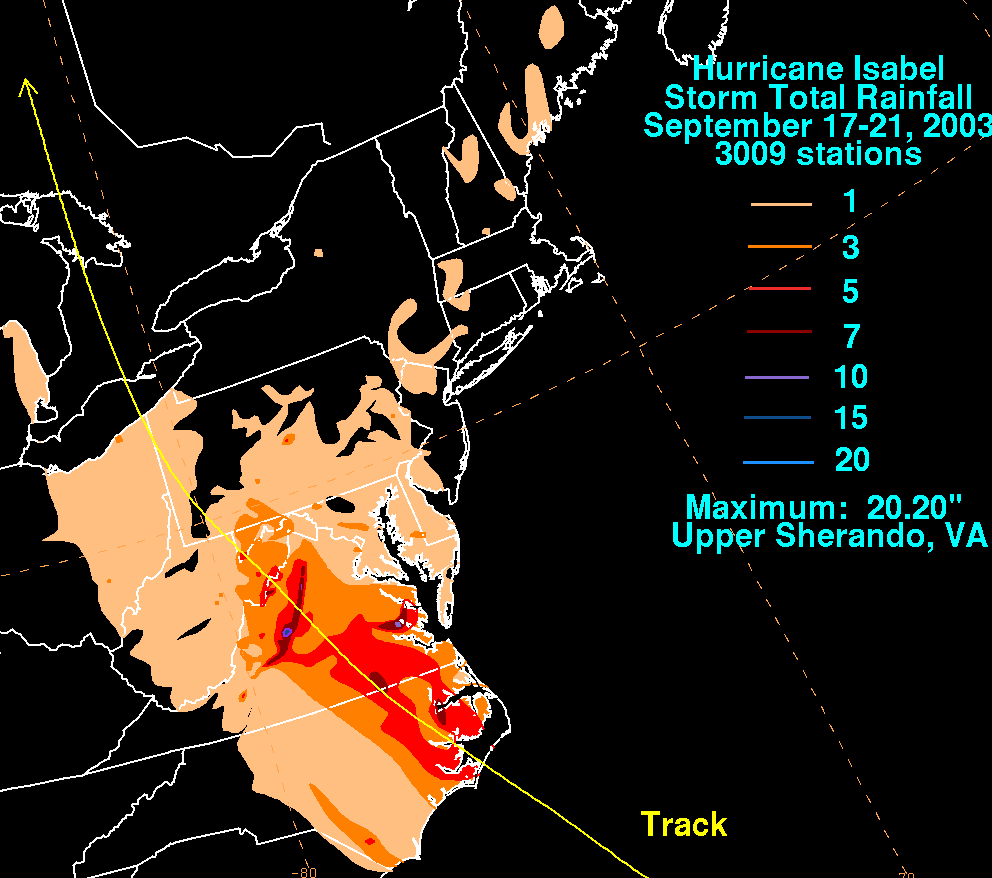
Rainfall totals from Hurricane Isabel

Powerful surf affected the northern coastlines of the islands in the Greater Antilles. Strong swells also lashed the Bahamas. During most hurricanes, the location of the Bahamas prevents powerful swells of Atlantic hurricanes from striking southeast Florida. However, the combination of the location, forward speed, and strength of Isabel produced strong swells through the Providence Channel onto a narrow 10 miles (16 km) stretch of the southeastern Florida coastline; wave heights peaked at 14 feet (4.3 m) at Delray Beach. The swells capsized a watercraft and injured its two passengers at Boynton Beach, and a swimmer required assistance to be rescued near Juno Beach. Minor beach erosion was reported in Palm Beach County. In the northern portion of the state, waves reached up to 15 feet (4.6 m) in height at Flagler Beach, causing the Flagler Beach Pier to be closed due to damaged boards from the waves. Rip currents from Isabel killed a surfer at an unguarded beach in Nassau County, with an additional six people requiring rescue from the currents.

In northeastern South Carolina, the outer rainbands produced moderate winds reaching 45 mph (72 km/h) at Myrtle Beach. Rainfall was light, peaking at 1.34 inches (34 mm) in Loris.

=== North Carolina ===
Isabel produced moderate to heavy damage across eastern North Carolina, totaling $450 million (2003 USD). Damage was heaviest in Dare County, where storm surge flooding and strong winds damaged thousands of houses. The storm surge produced a 2,000 feet (610 m) wide inlet on Hatteras Island, unofficially known as Isabel Inlet, isolating Hatteras by road for two months. Strong winds downed hundreds of trees of across the state, leaving up to 700,000 residents without power. Most areas with power outages had power restored within a few days. The hurricane directly killed one person and indirectly killed two in the state.

=== Mid-Atlantic ===
About 1.24 million people lost power throughout Maryland and Washington, D.C. The worst of Isabel's effects came from its storm surge, which inundated areas along the coast and resulted in severe beach erosion. In Eastern Maryland, hundreds of buildings were damaged by the storm surge and related tidal flooding. The most severe flooding occurred in the southern portions of Dorchester and Somerset counties and on Kent Island in Queen Anne's County. Thousands of houses were affected in Central Maryland, with severe storm surge flooding reported in Baltimore and Annapolis. Washington, D.C. sustained moderate damage, primarily from the winds. Throughout Maryland and Washington, damage totaled about $945 million (2003 USD), with only one direct fatality due to flooding.

The effects of the hurricane in Delaware were compounded by flooding caused by the remnants of Tropical Storm Henri days before. Winds reached 62 mph (100 km/h) in Lewes. The winds knocked down numerous trees and power lines across the state, leaving at least 15,300 without power. Along the coast, the storm surge reached 8.66 feet (2.64 m) at Reedy Point. High tides and waves caused beach erosion and coastal flooding, which closed 62 roads statewide, inundating a portion of Delaware Route 1. The passage of Hurricane Isabel resulted in $40 million in damage (2003 USD) in Delaware.

Moving through West Virginia as a tropical storm, Isabel produced wind gusts of 46 mph (74 km/h) in Martinsburg. Rainfall reached 6.88 in (175 mm) at a station near Sugar Grove. Across the state, the storm resulted in about $10 million in damage. Heavy rainfall in combination with the strong wind gusts knocked down trees, which fell onto power lines, cars, and houses. Flash flooding also occurred along rivers, which caused mudslides, washed out two bridges, and broke a levee. Two people required rescue after driving into flooded waters in Jefferson County.

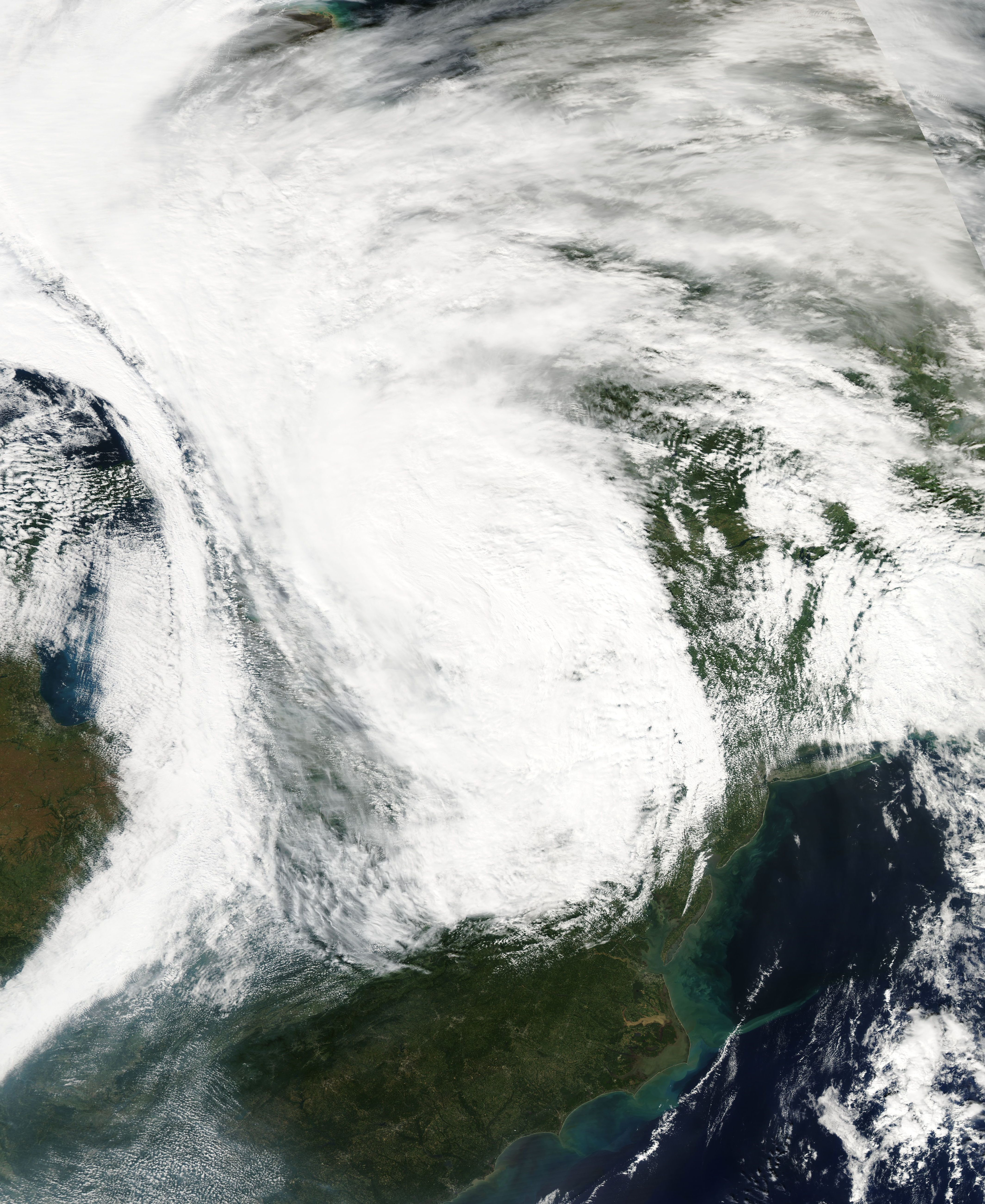
Hurricane Isabel's extratropical remnant over the Northeastern United States on September 19

The passage of Isabel through Pennsylvania resulted in two deaths and about $160 million in damage. One person died from carbon monoxide poisoning, believed to be caused due to improperly ventilated generators in an area affected by the power outages. The other death occurred when a tree struck a motorist in Lancaster. Wind gusts reached 60 mph (97 km/h) in Forks Township, and 49 mph (79 km/h) in Philadelphia. The winds knocked down trees and power lines, leaving 1.4 million customers across the state without power. Dozens of trees and houses were also damaged by the fallen trees, and roads were closed. High tides caused flooding along low-lying areas of the Delaware River.

Although well to the east of Isabel's center, New Jersey experienced gale-force winds, with gusts to 63 mph (101 km/h) recorded in Cape May. The hurricane killed two people in the state. A tree struck and killed a motorist in Independence Township, and high waves killed a swimmer off Wildwood Crest. Statewide, damage totaled $25 million. Strong winds knocked down trees and power lines across the state, leaving at least 382,000 people without power. High waves and tides eroded beaches along the state's southern coast. In North Jersey, the high winds caused three injuries, one due to a fallen tree, and the others due to broken glass. In Union County, storm debris forced the cancelation of schools.

In New York, one person drowned while surfing off Long Beach. Statewide, the hurricane left at least $45 million in damage. Strong winds knocked down trees across the state, injuring two drivers in the New York area. In the New York City area, about 1.1 million people lost power, most of which was restored within a day. The hurricane brought unusual birds to the western portion of the state, including petrels and shearwaters normally found in salt-water regions or over the open ocean. Most of the birds died within a few days due to the sudden change in habitat. In Cayuga County, downed power lines lit one building on fire.

==== Virginia ====
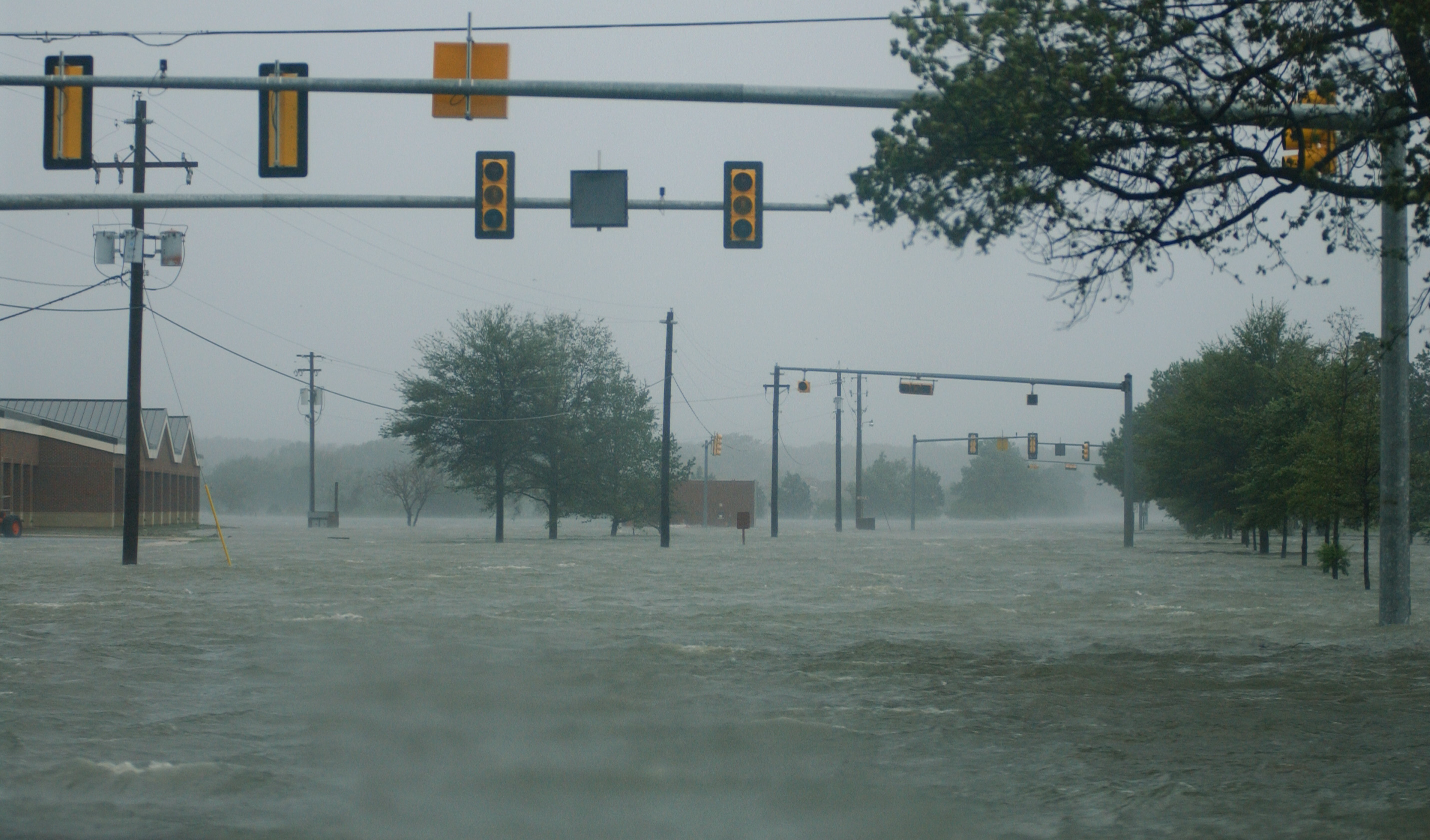
Flood waters at Langley AFB, Hampton, Virginia as a result of Hurricane Isabel

The storm surge assailed much of southeastern Virginia causing the worst flooding seen in the area since the 1933 Chesapeake–Potomac hurricane, peaking at an estimated 9 feet (2.7 m) in Richmond along the James River. The surge caused significant damage to homes along river ways, especially along the middle reaches of the James River basin. The strong storm surge surpassed the floodgate to the Midtown Tunnel while workers attempted to close the gate; about 44 million US gallons (170,000 m^{3}) of water flooded the tunnel entirely in just 40 minutes, with the workers barely able to escape. The damage to the electrical grid and flooding kept Old Dominion University, Norfolk State University, Virginia Commonwealth University, University of Richmond, The College of William & Mary and many of the region's other major educational institutions closed for almost a week. Further inland, heavy rainfall was reported, peaking at 20.2 inches (510 mm) in Sherando, Virginia, causing damage and severe flash flooding. Winds from the hurricane destroyed over 1,000 houses and damaged 9,000 more; damage in the state totaled over $1.85 billion (2003 USD), among the costliest tropical cyclones in Virginia history. The passage of Isabel also resulted in 32 deaths in the state, 10 directly from the storm's effects and 22 indirectly related.

=== Elsewhere ===
Isabel's effects extended into New England, including light rainfall and strong wind gusts. High surf killed a man in Narragansett, Rhode Island. In Vermont, wind gusts reached 60 mph (97 km/h) in Starksboro. The winds knocked down a few trees and power lines, some of which fell onto vehicles.

Isabel dropped light to moderate precipitation across the eastern half of Ohio, with isolated locations reporting over 3 in (76 mm). Moisture from Isabel dropped light rainfall across eastern Michigan and peaked at 1.55 inches (39 mm) at Mount Clemens. Additionally, Doppler weather radar estimated rainfall approached 2.5 inches (64 mm) in St. Clair County. No damage was reported from Isabel in the region.

Swells from Isabel produced moderate surf along the Atlantic coast of Nova Scotia, particularly in the Gulf of Maine. Isabel also produced rough surf in Lake Ontario, with waves reaching 4 m (13 ft) along the western portion. At Hamilton, the waves surpassed seawalls and produced spray onto coastal streets. Rainfall peaked at 59 mm (2.3 in), which caused minor flooding and led to one traffic fatality. About 27,000 people lost power, mostly near Toronto. The strong pressure gradient between Isabel and a high pressure system over eastern Canada produced strong easterly winds across lakes Ontario and Erie. A buoy in Lake Ontario reported a peak gust of 78 km/h (48 mph), and gusts reached as strong as 81 km/h (50 mph) at Port Colborne, Ontario.

== Aftermath ==
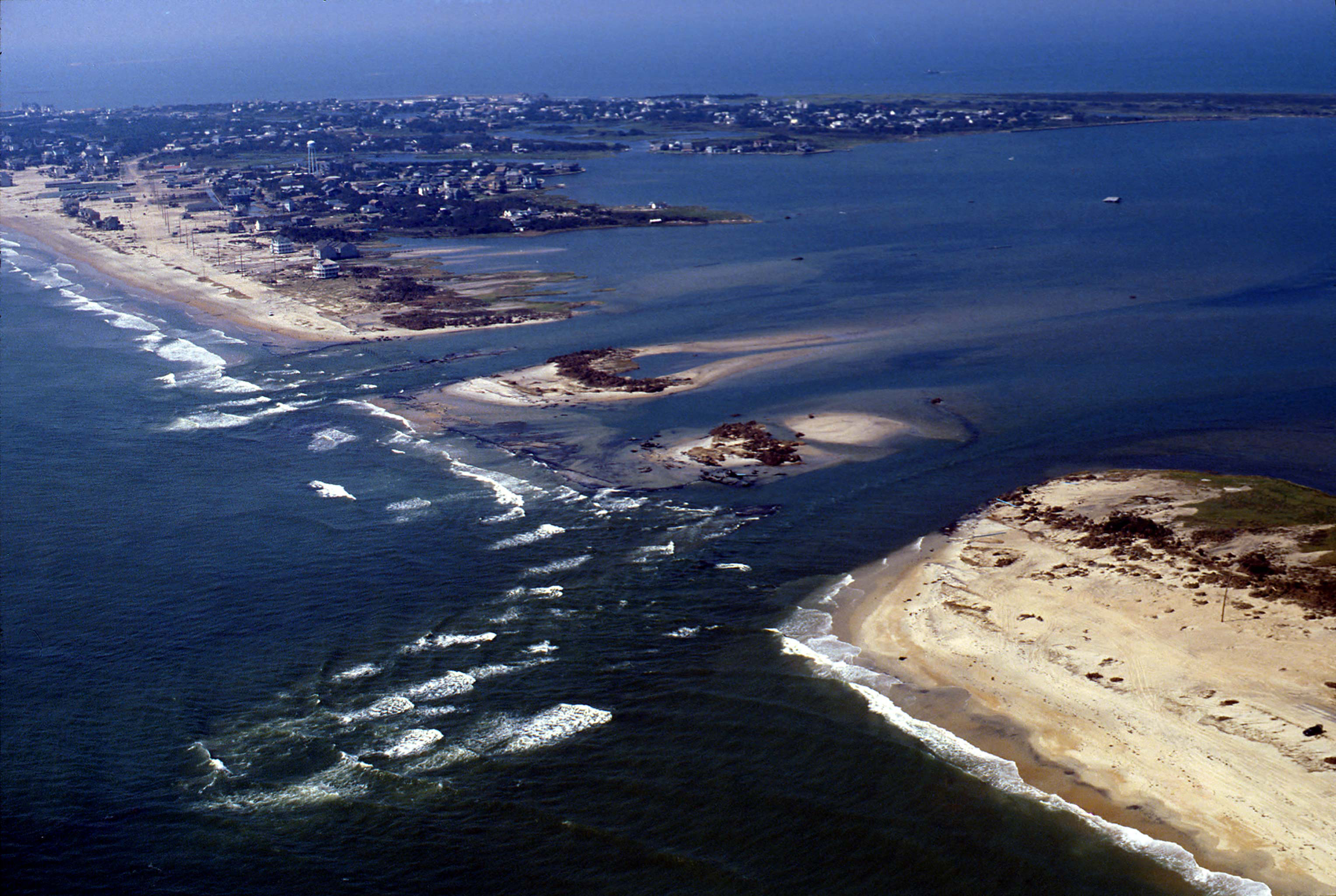
Damage to the Barrier Islands after Hurricane Isabel (USGS)

The widespread damage from Isabel across the eastern United States prompted then-President George W. Bush to declare disaster areas across the entirety of Delaware and Maryland, as well as 36 North Carolina counties, 77 Virginia counties or independent cities, 6 West Virginia counties, and 7 Pennsylvania counties, as well as the District of Columbia. The disaster declaration allocated the use of federal funds for rebuilding and providing aid in the aftermath of hurricane Isabel. By about four months after the passage of the hurricane, disaster aid totaled about $516 million (2004 USD), primarily in North Carolina and Virginia. Over 166,000 residents applied for individual assistance, with about $117 million (2004 USD) approved for residents to assist with temporary housing and home repairs. About 50,000 business owners applied for Small Business Administration loans, with about $178 million (2004 USD) approved for the assistance loans. About 40,000 people visited local disaster recovery centers, designed to provide additional information regarding the aftermath of the hurricane.

In North Carolina, hundreds of residents were stranded in Hatteras following the formation of Isabel Inlet. People who were not residents were not allowed to be on the Outer Banks for two weeks after the hurricane due to damaged road conditions. When visitors were allowed to return, many ventured to see the new inlet, despite a 1-mile (1.6-km) walk from the nearest road. Initially, long-term solutions to the Isabel Inlet such as building a bridge or a ferry system were considered, though they were ultimately canceled in favor of pumping sand and filling the inlet. Coastal geologists were opposed to the solution, stating the evolution of the Outer Banks is dependent on inlets from hurricanes. Dredging operations began on October 17, about a month after the hurricane struck. The United States Geological Survey used sand from the ferry channel to the southwest of Hatteras Island, a choice made to minimize the impact to submerged aquatic vegetation and due to the channel being filled somewhat during the hurricane. On November 22, about two months after the hurricane struck, North Carolina Highway 12 and Hatteras Island were reopened to public access. On the same day, the ferry between Hatteras and Ocracoke was reopened.

Across the northeastern United States, workers immediately began repairing the power failures by clearing tree branches and replacing fuses and circuit breakers. PECO energy restored power to 72% of the affected customers by two days after the storm, with 85% restored by two nights. By two days after the storm, Pennsylvania Power and Light restored power to about 80% of its impacted customers, with about 93% restored by two nights after the storm. By five days after Isabel, most power outages in southeastern Pennsylvania were repaired, with all outages restored by a week after the hurricane. Allegheny Power restored power to about 20% of its customers by two days after the storm. Most power outages for the company were restored by five days after the hurricane, with all power completely restored by a week after Isabel. In West Virginia, the power outages were restored within a week. Power workers throughout Canada assisted the severely affected power companies from Maryland to North Carolina. Hydro-Québec sent 25 teams to the New York City area to assist in power outages. Officials in Connecticut sent a tractor trailer truck with water and ice to help residents in North Carolina.

In the Chesapeake Bay, the passage of the hurricane caused an algal bloom of phytoplankton, which was the largest bloom in the fall ever observed in the body of water. By two weeks after Isabel, the water returned to normal levels. The hurricane also disrupted the flight pattern of several bird species, leading to unusual birds being spotted across upstate New York and Vermont.

=== Retirement ===
Because of widespread property damage and extensive death toll, the World Meteorological Organization retired the name Isabel in the spring of 2004, and it will never again be used for a North Atlantic tropical cyclone. It was replaced with Ida for the 2009 season.

== See also ==
- List of Category 5 Atlantic hurricanes
- List of North Carolina hurricanes (2000–present)
- List of Virginia hurricanes
- Timeline of the 2003 Atlantic hurricane season
- List of notable media in the field of meteorology
