= Rocketts Landing =

Neighborhood in Richmond, Virginia

- Neighborhood of Richmond
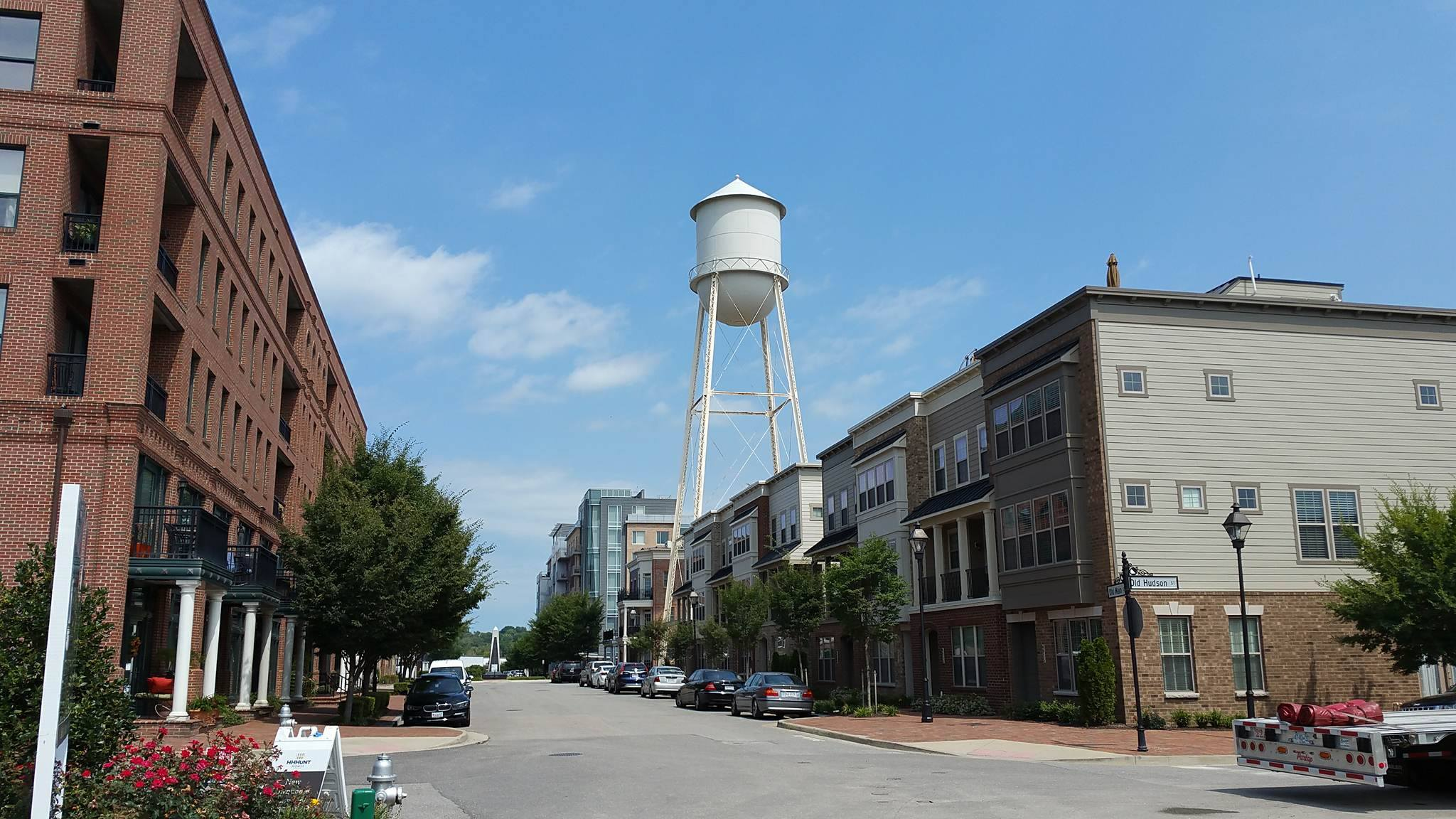
- Rocketts Landing in 2015
- Interactive map of Rocketts Landing
- Coordinates: 37°30′55″N 77°24′50″W
- Country: United States
- State: Virginia
- City: Richmond
- Established: 2010
- Time zone: UTC−04:00 (Eastern Daylight Time)
  - Summer (DST): UTC−05:00 (Eastern Standard Time)
- ZIP code: 23231
- Area code: 804
- ISO 3166 code: 1
- Website: rockettsvillage.com

Rockett's Landing (or simply Rocketts) is a new urbanist neighborhood in southeastern Richmond, Virginia on the border of Henrico County, Virginia and the north bank of the James River. It was named after Baldwin Rockett, an 18th-century ship's captain born in April 1681 in Exeter, Devon, England.

The neighborhood was originally a factory and water tower and has been converted into mixed-use development with brick streets. It is served by the GRTC Pulse Rocketts Landing station.

== Civil War ==
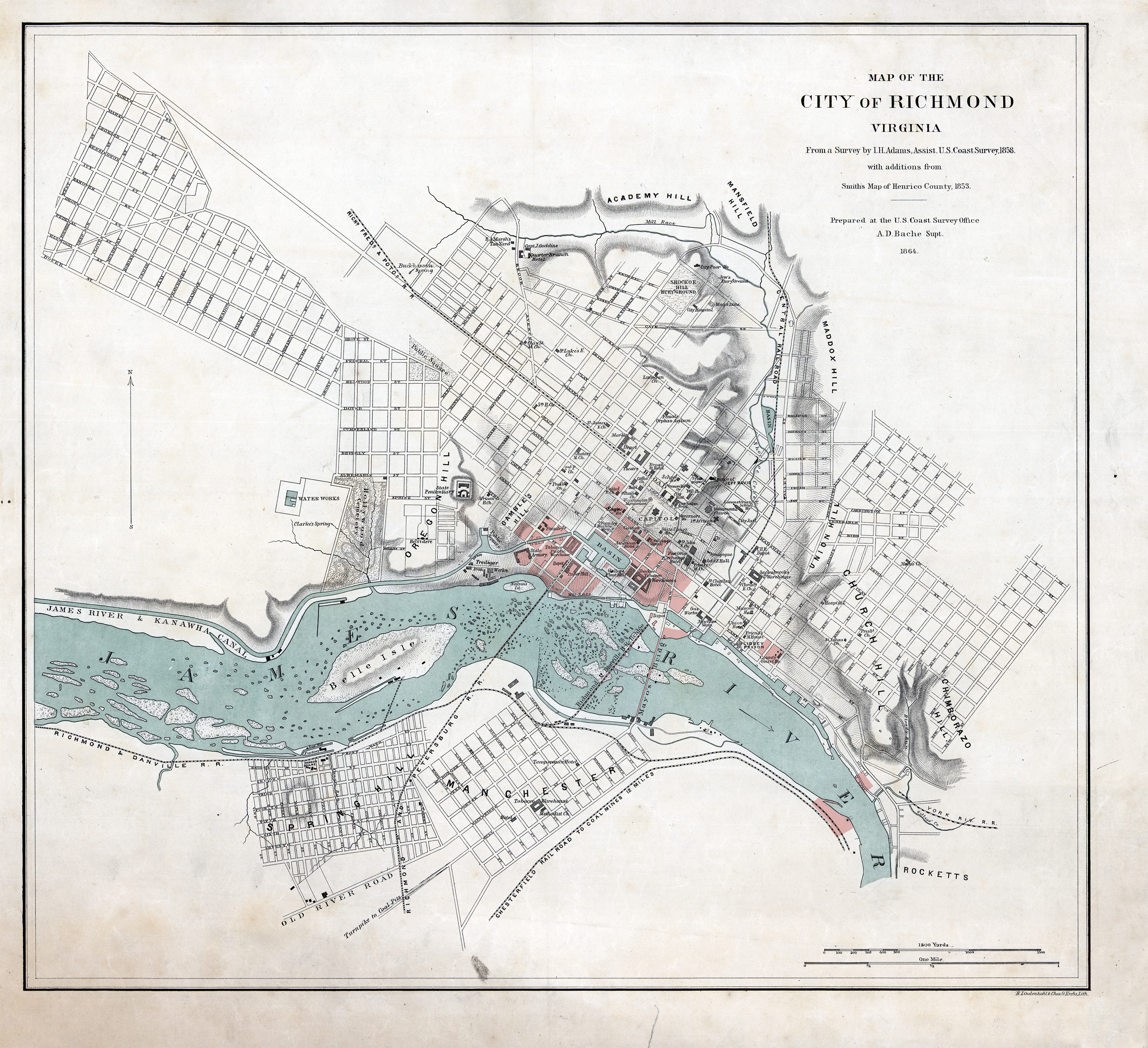
Contemporary map of the Richmond area, showing the burnt Rockett's Yard in the lower right

In the American Civil War, and still a suburban hamlet of Richmond at the time, the northern fringes of Rockett's Landing were chosen to become one of the two sites in the Richmond area to serve as a Confederate Navy shipyard as compensation for the loss of the Portsmouth Naval Shipyard in May 1862 (the other one having been William Armistead Graves' smaller "Graves's Yard" further upstream), with yard installations eventually straddling both sides of the James River. During the remainder of the war, the yard, at the time simply known as the "Navy Yard", serviced and built vessels for the James River Squadron, most notably its casemate ironclads such as CSS Fredericksburg, CSS Richmond and CSS Texas (1865). The yard ceased operations and was partially burnt by retreating Confederate troops when Richmond fell to Union troops the next day on April 3, 1865, though the hamlet itself was spared according to the contemporary map, featured on the left.

When President Abraham Lincoln started his tour of the fallen city the following day, he came ashore at Rockett's Landing.
