= Henrico County Board of Supervisors =

Type
- Type: Board of Supervisors

Leadership
- Chair: Tyrone Nelson (D)
- Vice Chair: Daniel Schmitt (R)

Structure
- Seats: 5
- Political groups: Governing party: Democratic (4); Opposition: Republican (1)
- Length of term: 4 years

Elections
- Last election: November 7, 2023
- Next election: November 2, 2027

Meeting place
- Henrico County Government Complex; Henrico, Virginia

Website
- Henrico County Board

The Henrico County Board of Supervisors is the governing body of Henrico County, a county in the Greater Richmond Region of Virginia. The five member of the Board represent the five magisterial districts of the county. Members are not term limited and are elected to four-year terms.

The Board usually meets on the third Tuesday every month in the Public Meeting Room at the Henrico County Government Complex near Henrico, Virginia. Members of the public are invited to attend these meetings.

Democrats currently control the Board holding four of the five seats. Republicans control one seat on the Board.

== History ==
The first members of the Board were elected in 1870, after Henrico and the city of Richmond become independent governing entities under the revised Constitution of Virginia. In 1936, Henrico established the role of County Manager as the executive leader of the county, while the Board remained the policy-making body.

== Members ==
County Board of Supervisors
| Name | Party | First elected | District | Communities |
|---|---|---|---|---|
| Tyrone Nelson | Dem | 2011 | Varina | Elko, Darbytown, Highland Springs, Montrose, Sandston, Varina, Yahley Mills |
| Daniel Schmitt, Chair | Rep | 2018 | Brookland | Dumbarton, Glen Allen, Lakeside, Laurel, Willow Lawn |
| Misty Whitehead | Dem | 2023 | Three Chopt | Henrico, Innsbrook, Short Pump, Westbriar, Wyndham |
| Jody Rogish | Dem | 2023 | Tuckahoe | Canterbury, Lorraine, Quioccasin Station, Regency Square, Tuckahoe |
| Roscoe D. Cooper III, Vice Chair | Dem | 2023 | Fairfield | Chamberlayne, East Highland Park, Fairfield, Yellow Tavern |

== See also ==
- Board of supervisors
