= Richmond Railway (Richmond, Virginia) =

Overview
- Headquarters: Richmond, Virginia
- Dates of operation: March 20, 1860–March 15, 1881

The Richmond Railway Company was a railroad company serving the city of Richmond, Virginia. It was chartered by act of the Virginia legislature on March 20, 1860 and incorporated on May 17, 1860. Service began in August 1860. In 1863 the Civil War caused the railroad to cease operations but in January 1866 Joseph Jackson, Jr. took control of the company and restarted service in March 1866.

The Richmond Railway was sold on March 15, 1881 to the Richmond City Railway Company.
