= Richmond Union Passenger Railway =

Tram system in Richmond, Virginia (1888-1949)

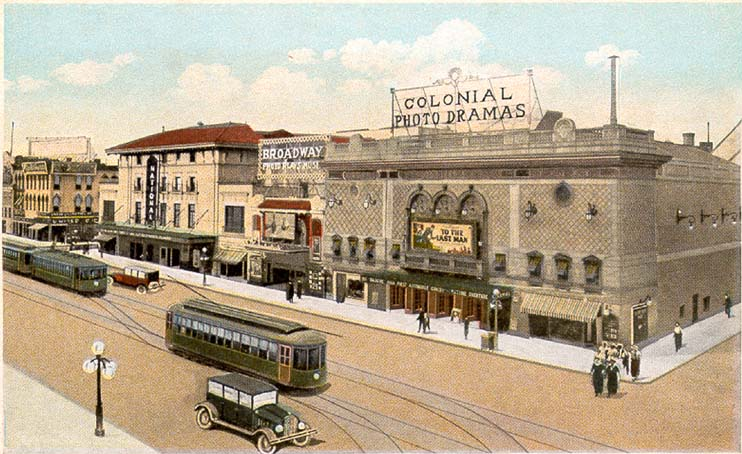
Richmond Theatrical District in 1923, with Perley Thomas streetcars.

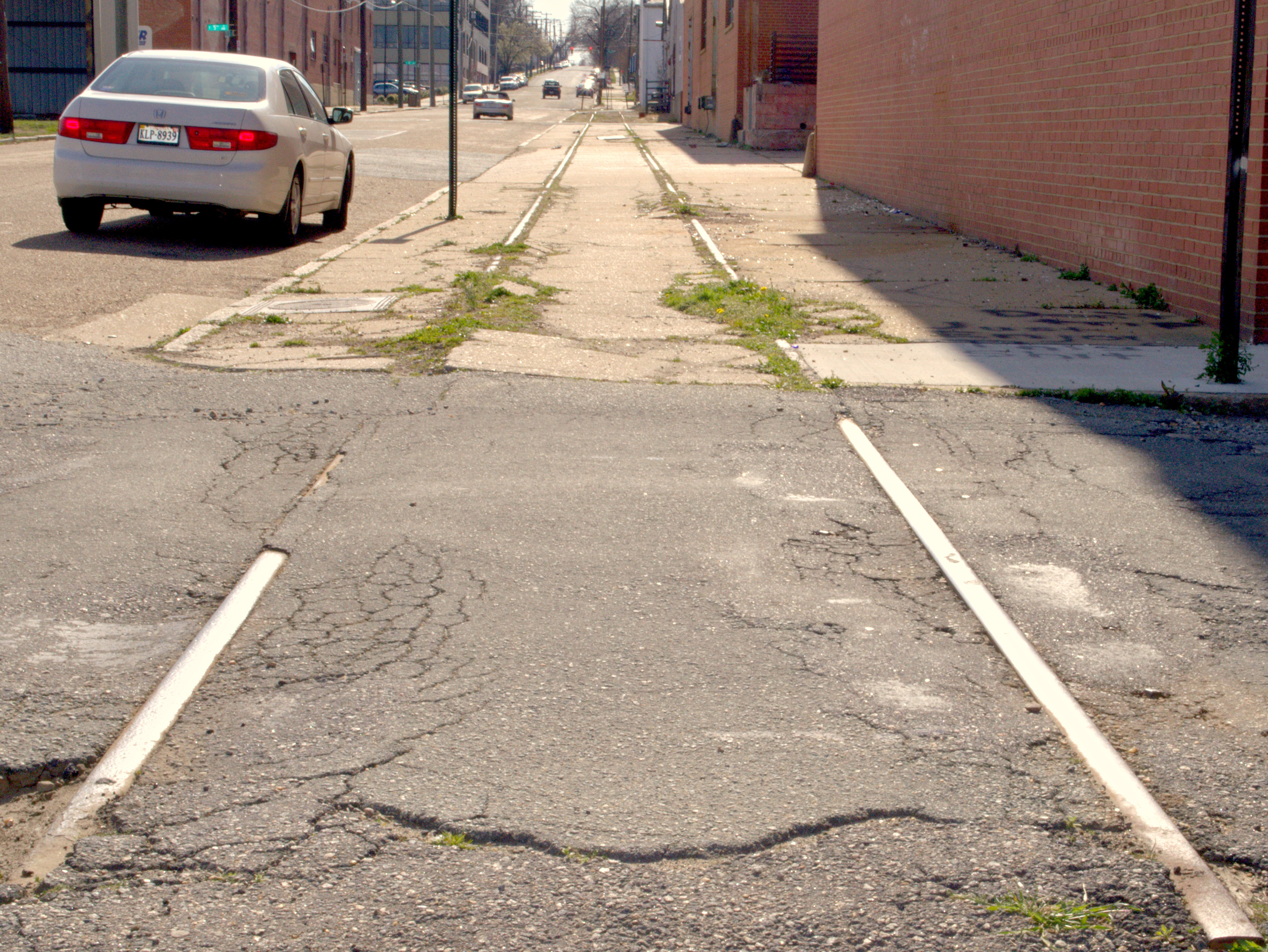
An industrial rail siding alongside Stockton Street between 4th and 5th Streets.

The Richmond Union Passenger Railway, in Richmond, Virginia, was the first practical electric trolley (tram) system, and set the pattern for most subsequent electric trolley systems around the world. It is an IEEE milestone in engineering.

The Richmond system was not the first attempt to operate an electric trolley. According to the IEEE, there were at least 74 earlier attempts to provide electric trolley service in over 60 communities in North America, the United Kingdom, and continental Europe. However, these earlier attempts were not reliable enough to replace the existing animal-hauled street railways.

The Richmond system was designed by Frank Julian Sprague. After trials in late 1887, it began regular operation on February 2, 1888, with 10 streetcars. Electric power was supplied through overhead trolley wires (450 volts) for two 7.5 horsepower (5.6 kW) motors on each car. Large cars weighed 6,900 pounds (3,100 kg), provided 40 seats, and carried up to 100 passengers; small cars weighed 6,700 pounds (3,000 kg) with 22 seats and up to 65 passengers. Running speed was 7.5 miles per hour (12.1 km/h), with 15 miles per hour (24 km/h) as a maximum speed. By June 1888 the system contained 40 cars running on some 12 miles (19 km) of track, including steep grades, and with 30 degree or 193.18-foot (58.88 m) minimum radius curves.

Its success proved that electric traction was both safe and reliable. The Boston City Council, after inspecting Richmond's system on September 7, 1888, approved construction the second such project by the West End Street Railway. Boston's trolley was closely patterned upon Richmond's, and again demonstrated its practicality. By 1895 almost 900 electric street railways and nearly 11,000 miles (18,000 km) of track had been built in the United States, and in a little over a decade animal-powered street railways had essentially vanished.

Richmond's electric trolley service ended on November 25, 1949. It would not be until 2018 that the city would once again be served by rapid transit, when the GRTC Pulse opened.

== Location ==
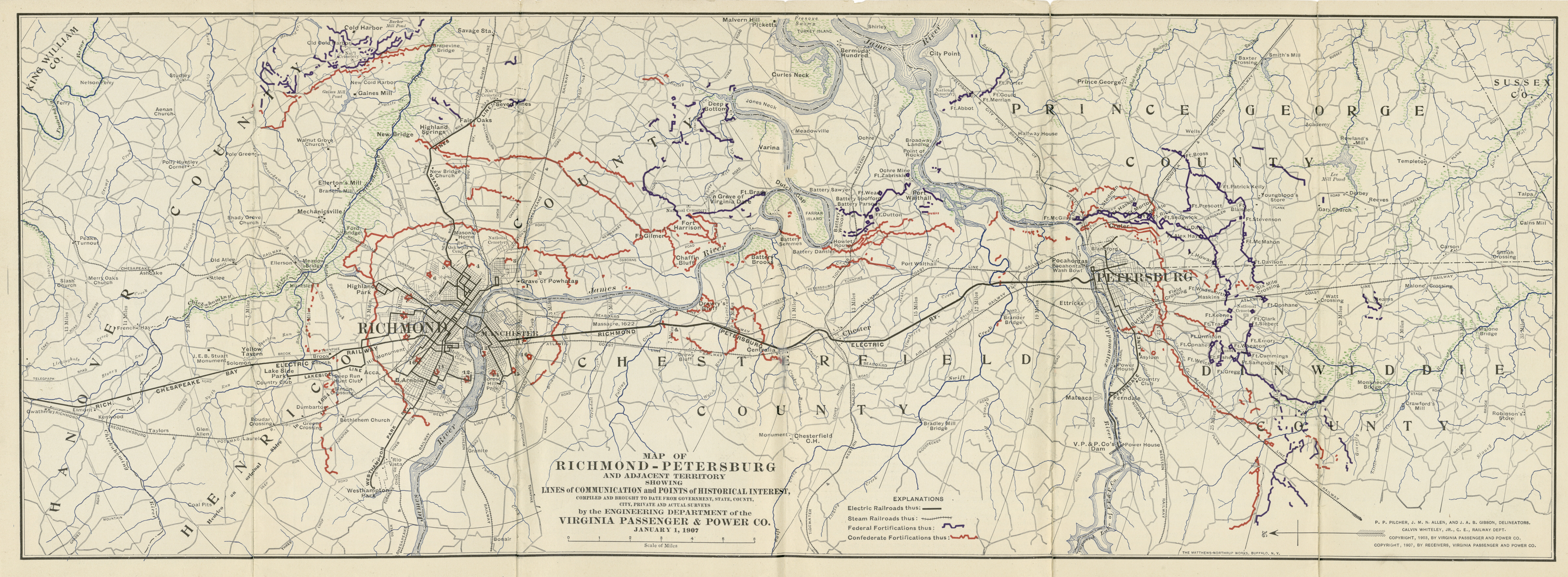
Map of Richmond and Petersburg showing Communication Lines and Points of interest from 1907.

== See also ==
- List of streetcar systems in the United States (Virginia)
- List of IEEE milestones
- "Rails in Richmond", by Carlton N McKenney. Old Dominion Chapter, Nat. Railway H.S. (January 1, 1986).
