= Southern Railway Depot =

Southern Railway Depot, or variations such as Southern Railway Passenger Station or Passenger Depot, Southern Railway Freight Depot or Freight Office, may refer to any of numerous railway stations operated by the U.S.-based Southern Railway or stations operated by other Southern Railway companies.

In the United States, these include:

== Alabama ==
- Southern Railway Terminal Station (Bessemer, Alabama), listed on the National Register of Historic Places (NRHP)
- Southern Railway Depot (Decatur, Alabama), listed on the NRHP
- Southern Railway System Depot (Huntsville, Alabama), listed on the NRHP
- Southern Railway Depot (Piedmont, Alabama), listed on the NRHP

== Georgia ==
- Southern Railway Freight Depot (Columbus, Georgia), listed on the NRHP
- Southern Railway North Avenue Yards Historic District, Atlanta, listed on the NRHP
- Peachtree Southern Railway Station, Atlanta, listed on the NRHP
- Toccoa station, a train station in Toccoa, Georgia

== Kentucky ==
- Southern Railway Passenger Depot (Lexington, Kentucky), listed on the NRHP

== Louisiana ==
- Southern Railway Freight Office (New Orleans), listed on the NRHP
- Southern Railway Terminal (New Orleans)

== Missouri ==
- Poplar Bluff (Amtrak station)

== North Carolina ==
- Southern Railway Passenger Depot (Asheville, North Carolina), listed on the NRHP
- Southern Railway Passenger Station (Burlington, North Carolina), listed on the NRHP
- Greensboro (Amtrak station)
- Southern Railway Depot (North Wilkesboro, North Carolina), listed on the NRHP

== South Carolina ==
- Southern Railway Depot (Batesburg-Leesville, South Carolina), listed on the NRHP
- Southern Railway Passenger Depot (Branchville, South Carolina), listed on the NRHP
- Southern Railway Depot (Ninety Six, South Carolina), listed on the NRHP
- Southern Railway Passenger Station (Westminster, South Carolina), listed on the NRHP

== Tennessee ==
- Southern Railway Freight Depot (Chattanooga, Tennessee), listed on the NRHP
- Cleveland Southern Railway Depot, Cleveland, listed on the NRHP
- Southern Railroad Freight Depot, Maryville, listed on the NRHP
- Southern Railway Industrial Historic District, Memphis, listed on the NRHP

== Virginia ==
- Southern Railway Depot (Richmond, Virginia), a passenger depot built in 1900 and demolished in 1914
- Danville station, listed on the NRHP

== See also ==
- Southern Railway's Spencer Shops, Spencer, North Carolina, listed on the NRHP
- Southern Railway Terminal (Budapest)
- Southern Terminal, Knoxville, Tennessee
