= Richmond Main Street Station =

Railway station in Richmond VA

Richmond, VA – Main Street
- Richmond Main Street Station in 2025

General information
- Location: 1500 East Main Street; Richmond, Virginia; United States
- Coordinates: 37°32′05″N 77°25′45″W
- Owner: City of Richmond
- Platforms: 1 side platform
- Tracks: 2 (8 historically, 4 on each side)
- Connections: GRTC: Pulse, 14, 95x Megabus; RamRide: Sanger Hill Express

Construction
- Accessible: Yes
- Architect: Wilson, Harris, & Richards
- Architectural style: Beaux Arts

Other information
- Station code: Amtrak: RVM
- IATA code: ZRD
- Website: mainstreetstationrichmond.com

History
- Opened: 1901

Passengers
- FY 2025: 129,928 (Amtrak)

Services
Preceding station	Amtrak	Following station
Williamsburg toward Newport News	Northeast Regional	Richmond Staples Mill Road toward Boston South or Springfield
Preceding station	GRTC Pulse	Following station
VCU Medical Center toward Willow Lawn	GRTC Pulse	Shockoe Bottom toward Rocketts Landing
Former services
Preceding station	Chesapeake and Ohio Railway	Following station
Chickahominy toward Cincinnati	Main Line	Fort Lee toward Phoebus
Korah toward Clifton Forge	Richmond and Alleghany Railroad	Terminus
Preceding station	Richmond, Fredericksburg and Potomac Railroad	Following station
Terminus	Main Line	Acca toward Washington, D.C.
Preceding station	Seaboard Air Line Railroad	Following station
Chester toward Tampa or Miami	Main Line	Terminus
Preceding station	Southern Railway	Following station
Richmond–Hull Street toward Danville	Danville – Richmond Until 1920s	Terminus
Terminus	Richmond – West Point Until 1920s	Fair Oaks toward West Point
Proposed services
Preceding station	Amtrak	Following station
Petersburg toward Norfolk	Northeast Regional	Richmond Staples Mill Road toward Boston South or Springfield
Petersburg toward Miami	Silver Star	Richmond Staples Mill Road toward New York
Petersburg toward Miami	Silver Meteor	Richmond Staples Mill Road toward New York
Petersburg toward Charlotte	Carolinian	Richmond Staples Mill Road toward New York
Petersburg toward Savannah	Palmetto	Richmond Staples Mill Road toward New York
- Main Street Station and Trainshed
- U.S. National Register of Historic Places
- U.S. National Historic Landmark
- Virginia Landmarks Register
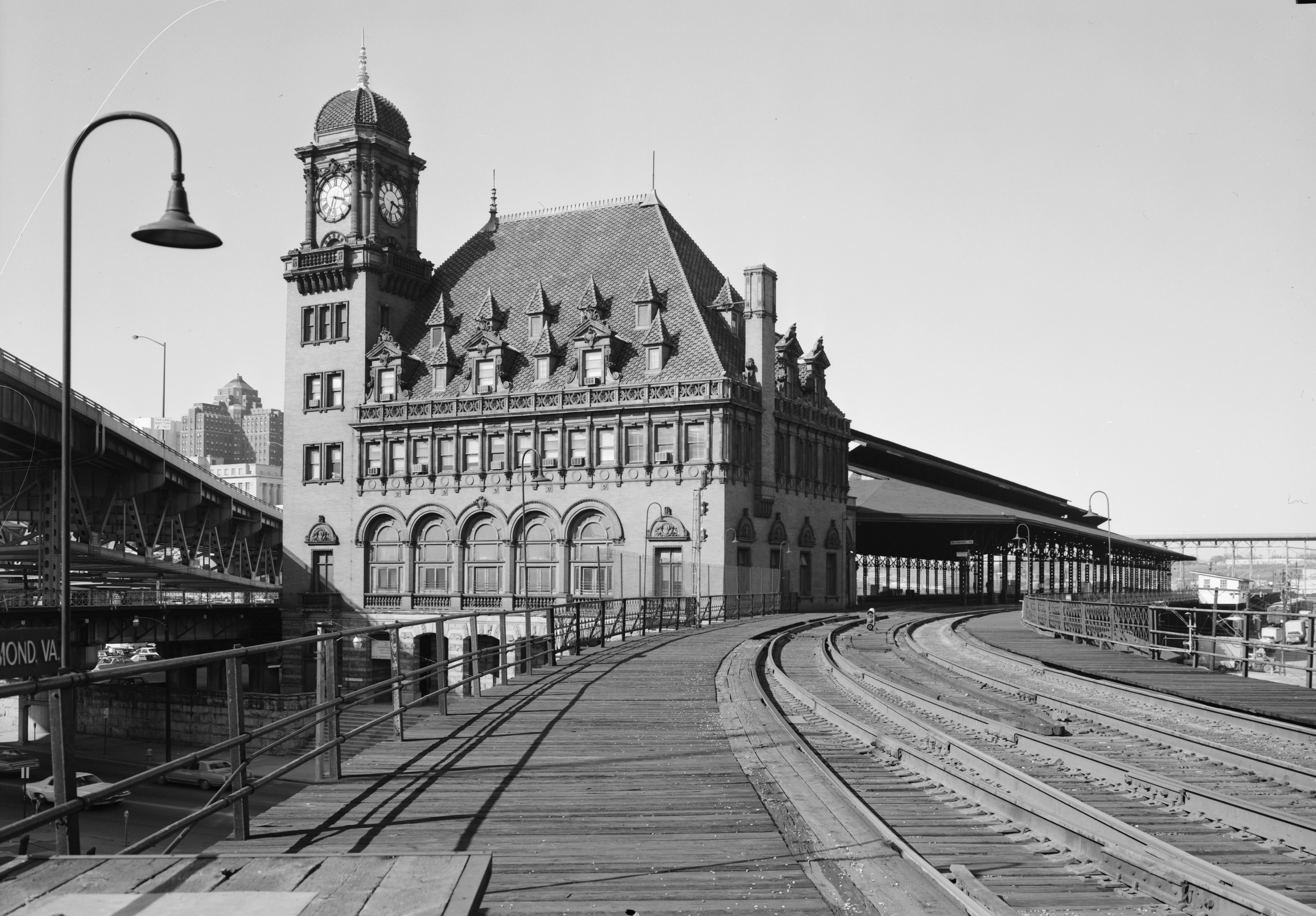
- Richmond Main Street Station in 1971
- NRHP reference No.: 70000867
- VLR No.: 127-0172

Significant dates
- Added to NRHP: October 15, 1970
- Designated NHL: December 8, 1976
- Designated VLR: July 7, 1970
Location

Richmond Main Street Station, officially the Main Street Station and Trainshed, is a historic railroad station and office building in Richmond, Virginia. It was built in 1901, and is served by Amtrak. It is also an intermodal station with Richmond's city transit bus services, which are performed by Greater Richmond Transit Company (GRTC). The station is colloquially known by residents as The Clock Tower. It was listed to the National Register of Historic Places in 1970, and in 1976 was made a U.S. National Historic Landmark. Main Street Station serves as a secondary train station for Richmond providing limited Amtrak service directly to downtown Richmond. Several Amtrak trains serving the Richmond metropolitan area only stop at the area's primary rail station, Staples Mill Road which is located five miles to the north in Henrico County.

The station is served by three daily Northeast Regional trains, two of which originate or terminate at Newport News. The other train originates/terminates at Richmond Main Street Station. Northbound trains provide direct service to Union Station in Washington, Pennsylvania Station in New York, and South Station in Boston, among other stops. Since 2018, the station has also been a stop along the GRTC Pulse bus rapid transit line.

Interstate 95 passes directly next to the station.

== History ==
Richmond's Main Street Station in the downtown area was built in 1901 by the Seaboard Air Line Railroad (SAL) and the Chesapeake and Ohio Railway (C&O). Seaboard had introduced service to Richmond, and C&O had consolidated the former Virginia Central Railroad and the Richmond and Allegheny Railroad, which had previously maintained separate stations.

The ornate Main Street Station was designed by the Philadelphia firm of Wilson, Harris, and Richards in the Second Renaissance Revival style. Since its 1901 construction, the building's roof has featured Conosera tile produced by Ludowici. In 1959, Seaboard shifted its Richmond passenger service to Broad Street Station (now the Science Museum of Virginia), ending service to the north platform and across the James River. The C&O maintained offices in the upper floors, and its passenger service continued at Main Street Station until Amtrak took over in 1971.

Major long distance passenger train services in the mid and late 1960s included:

- Chesapeake and Ohio trains west to Louisville, Cincinnati and Detroit:
  - Fast Flying Virginian
  - George Washington
  - Sportsman

In 1970, Main Street Station and its trainshed, one of the last surviving trainsheds of its type in the nation, were added to the National Register of Historic Places. In 1976 it was designated a National Historic Landmark.

Amtrak took over most intercity passenger train service in the United States on May 1, 1971, including trains to Main Street Station. In 1972, Hurricane Agnes caused the James River to flood the station. The damage was so severe that in 1975, Amtrak moved its Richmond stops to Richmond Staples Mill Road, a much smaller suburban station in Henrico County, five miles north of downtown. To make matters worse, the station was damaged by fires in 1976 and 1983.

Following a 1983 fire, Main Street Station was renovated and reopened as a shopping mall in 1985. The mall closed in 1986, after which the state of Virginia converted the building into office space.

=== Service restoration ===
Main Street Station reopened to Amtrak service on December 18, 2003, following renovations.

In 2018, the station became a stop on the GRTC Bus Rapid Transit's Broad and Main Street Line. There are also plans for Main Street Station to become an intermodal station with Richmond's city bus services operated by GRTC, a public service company owned jointly by the City of Richmond and Chesterfield County.

Local officials hoped to increase the number of trains stopping at Main Street Station by extending services that otherwise terminate at Staples Mill station in suburban Henrico County. The completion of a bypass around Acca Yard in March 2019 was a step in this direction, although the first additional service that it enabled—a second Northeast Regional round trip to Norfolk—did not serve Main Street Station.

On September 27, 2021, two Northeast Regionals—one northbound in the morning and the other southbound in the evening—were extended from Staples Mill to Main Street Station as the first part of Virginia's multi-billion dollar rail expansion program.

Main Street Station is also the location of the downtown Richmond stops for two routes of the Virginia Breeze intercity bus service. One route, the Capital Connector, links Richmond with Danville, Martinsville, Farmville, and Washington, DC, while the other, the Tidewater Current, serves Virginia Beach, Norfolk, Newport News, Williamsburg, Richmond International Airport, Charlottesville, and Staunton.

=== Proposed future ===
Main Street Station is located on the Southeast High Speed Rail Corridor (SEHSR). The 2017 Draft Environmental Impact Report of the DC2RVA project recommended routing all trains that serve Staples Mill station through Main Street Station, while maintaining full service to Staples Mill. Other considered alternatives had involved closing one of the two stations, or replacing both with a single station at Boulevard or Broad Street.

The Virginia Passenger Rail Authority plans to build a layover facility in Fulton Yard, southeast of downtown Richmond, for trains that terminate at Main Street. The project received a $25 million federal grant in July 2026.

== See also ==
- Broad Street Station
- Transportation in Richmond, Virginia
- List of National Historic Landmarks in Virginia
- National Register of Historic Places listings in Richmond, Virginia
