= Great Southern =

Great Southern may refer to:

- Great Southern (automobile), a car in production from 1910 to 1914
- Great Southern (band), the backing band for American rock guitarist Dickey Betts
- Great Southern (train), a luxury train service in Australia
- Great Southern (Western Australia), a region in Western Australia
- Great Southern (wine region), in Western Australia
- Great Southern Group, a corporate group in Australia which collapsed in 2009
- Great Southern Television, based in Auckland and Sydney
- TSS Great Southern (1902), a ship built in 1902 for the Great Western Railway
- Great Southern Bank, Australian bank

== See also ==
- Great Southern Railway (disambiguation)
