= GSR =

GSR may refer to:

== Law ==
- General Statutory Rules

== Medicine, science and technology ==
- Galvanic skin response, physiological phenomenon
- Glutathione-disulfide reductase, enzyme
- Gunshot residue

== Organizations ==
- Gas Safe Register, in the United Kingdom
- Global Sea Mineral Resources, an underwater mining company
- Groupe Scolaire La Résidence, a French international school in Casablanca, Morocco

== Places ==
- Gerber Scout Reservation, a scouting facility in Michigan, U.S.
- Postal code for Għasri, Gozo Island, Malta
- Grand Sierra Resort, a hotel and casino in Nevada, U.S.

== Transport ==
- Acura Integra GS-R, an automobile
- IATA code for Qardho Airport, Somalia

=== Rail systems ===
- Great Southern Railway (disambiguation)
  - Great Southern Railways, a former Irish railway company
- Gondal State Railway, in British India
- Great Sandhills Railway, a Canadian railway

== Other uses ==
- Greenville Swamp Rabbits
- Grammata Serica Recensa, a dictionary of Old Chinese
- General Service Respirator, a military gas mask
- SIG Sauer GSR, a pistol variety
