= Hull Street Station =

Railroad station and museum in Virginia, US

Richmond Railroad Museum
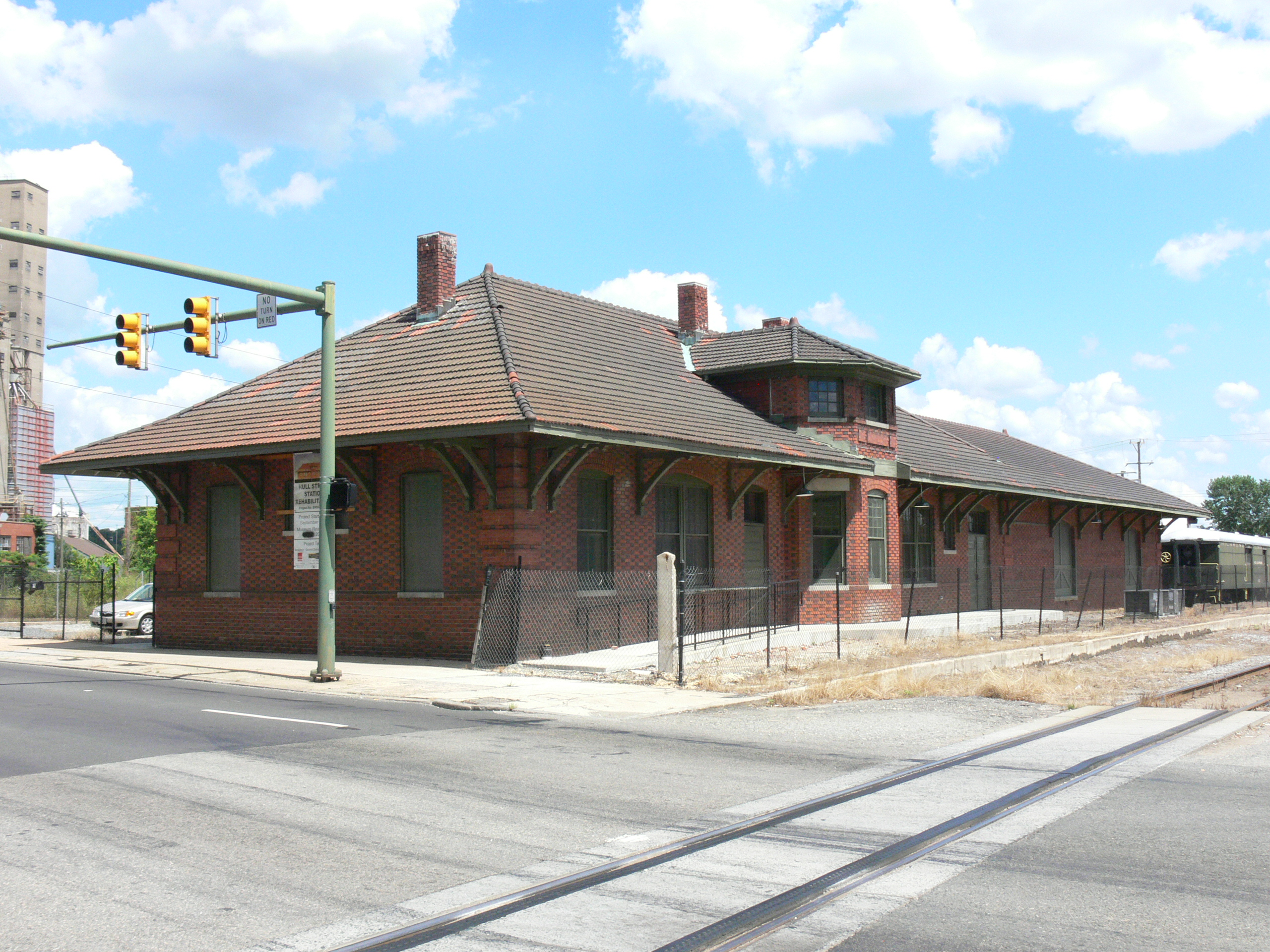

General information
- Location: 102 Hull Street, Richmond, Virginia, United States

Other information
- Website: http://www.odcnrhs.org/

Other services
Preceding station	Southern Railway	Following station
Granite toward Danville	Danville – Richmond	Terminus
Granite toward Danville	Danville – Richmond	Richmond–Main Street Until 1920s Terminus
Terminus	Richmond – West Point 1920s–1940s	Richmond–14th Street toward West Point
- Hull Street Station
- U.S. Historic district – Contributing property
- Coordinates: 37°31′35″N 77°26′13″W
- Built: 1901
- Part of: Manchester Industrial Historic District (ID00000886)
- Designated CP: August 2, 2000
Location

Hull Street Station was a railroad station in the city of Richmond, Virginia. It was built by the Southern Railway to replace Mill Street Station across the river in Richmond. The station, which had been closed, was damaged in several floods of the James River before Richmond's flood wall was completed in 1995. Since 2011, it has been the site of the Richmond Railroad Museum.

== Richmond Railroad Museum ==
The station is owned by the Old Dominion Chapter of the National Railway Historical Society (NRHS) which operates the Richmond Railroad Museum at the site.

== See also ==
- Broad Street Station (Richmond)
- Main Street Station (Richmond)
- Transportation in Richmond, Virginia
