= Great Southern Railway =

Great Southern Railway may refer to:

- Buenos Aires Great Southern Railway, former railway in Argentina
- Journey Beyond, operator of The Ghan, Indian Pacific and The Overland interstate passenger trains in Australia
- Main Southern railway line, or Great Southern Railway, in New South Wales, Australia
- Great Southern Railway (South Gippsland), former railway serving the South Gippsland region in Victoria, Australia
- Great Southern Railway (Western Australia), railway branch from Northam to Albany in Western Australia
- Great Southern Railways (Ireland)

== See also ==
- Great Southern (disambiguation)
- GSR (disambiguation)
- Southern Railway (disambiguation)
