= Danville Science Center =

- Location within Virginia Location within the United States
- Established: 1995
- Location: 677 Craghead St; Danville, Virginia
- Coordinates: 36.584°N 79.385°W
- Type: Science
- Owner: Science Museum of Virginia
- Website: dsc.smv.org

Danville Science Center is a science museum affiliated with the Science Museum of Virginia located in the tobacco warehouse district of Danville, Virginia.

The museum features rotating exhibits on the lower level and permanent exhibits on the upper level including a Science On a Sphere installation. Other science themes include biology, gravity, friction, force, light and magnetism. The Estelle H. Womack Natural History Collection of taxidermied animal mounts and exhibits on the area's rail history, including the Wreck of the Old 97, are also housed in the adjacent Danville station. There is a seasonal butterfly station.

== History ==
The Danville Science Center opened in 1995 alongside the Dan River in part of the former Danville station in a section known as the "Crossing at the Dan", a complex of restored historic buildings in Danville’s downtown warehouse district. The museum is now spread over two buildings with the renovation of the Southern Railway Administrative Building in 2005. A full digital dome theater was added in 2014.
