= Richmond Staples Mill Road station =

Railway station in Virginia

Richmond, VA Staples Mill Road
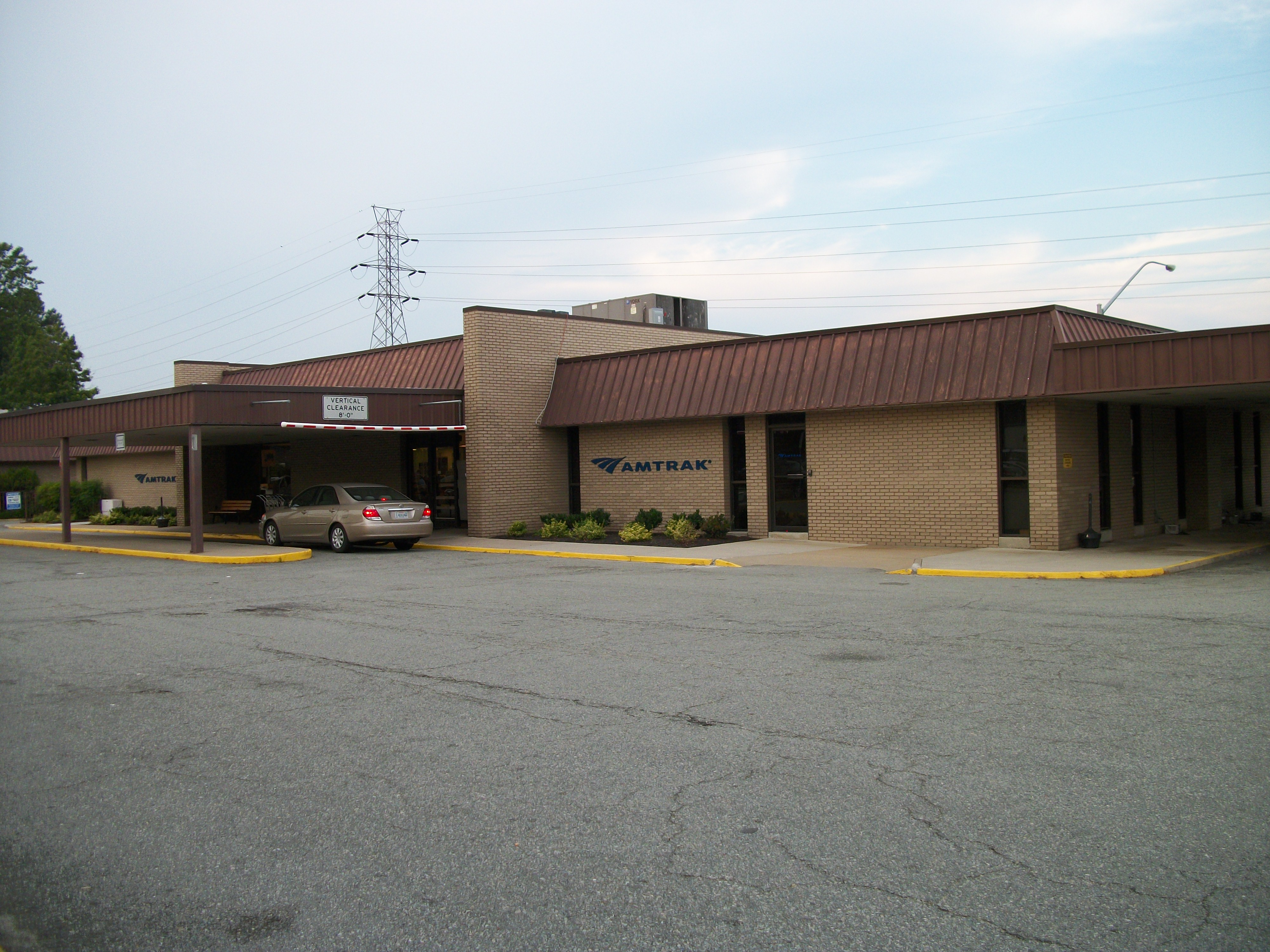
- Staples Mill Road station from the parking lot

General information
- Location: 7519 Staples Mill Road (US 33); Henrico, Virginia; United States
- Coordinates: 37.6178°N 77.4969°W
- Owner: Amtrak
- Line: CSX RF&P Subdivision
- Platforms: 2 island platforms
- Tracks: 5
- Connections: Amtrak Thruway; GRTC: 18

Construction
- Parking: Yes; paid
- Accessible: Yes

Other information
- Station code: Amtrak: RVR

History
- Opened: November 15, 1975

Passengers
- FY 2025: 506,023 (Amtrak)

Services
Preceding station	Amtrak	Following station
Richmond–Main Street toward Newport News	Northeast Regional	Ashland toward Boston South or Springfield
Petersburg toward Norfolk	Northeast Regional	Ashland toward Boston South or Springfield
Petersburg toward Savannah	Palmetto	Alexandria toward New York
Petersburg toward Miami	Floridian	Alexandria toward Chicago
Petersburg toward Miami	Silver Meteor	Fredericksburg toward New York
Petersburg toward Charlotte	Carolinian	Fredericksburg toward New York
Auto Train does not stop here
Former services
Preceding station	Amtrak	Following station
Petersburg toward Miami	Silver Star	Alexandria toward New York
Location

Richmond Staples Mill Road station is an Amtrak train station located in unincorporated Henrico County, Virginia, about 6 miles (10 km) northwest of downtown Richmond. The busiest Amtrak station in the state of Virginia, it is served by the daily Carolinian, Floridian, Palmetto, Silver Meteor, and several daily Northeast Regional trains.

== History ==
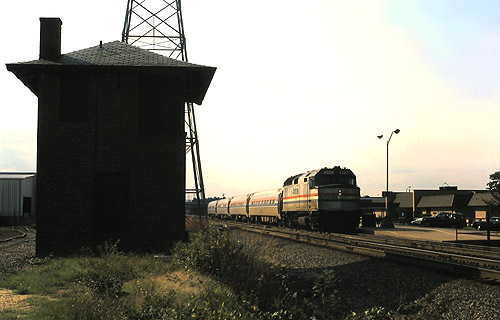
A northbound train at the station in 1987

Amtrak took over intercity passenger rail service in the United States on May 1, 1971. Ex-Seaboard Coast Line trains (Champion, Silver Meteor, and Silver Star) continued to use Broad Street Station in Richmond, while the Newport News section of the ex-Chesapeake and Ohio Railway George Washington (later James Whitcomb Riley) continued to use Main Street Station. Amtrak abandoned Broad Street Station on November 15, 1975, with trains moving to Richmond Staples Mill Road station in suburban Henrico County. It was designed by David Volkert and Associates.

The James Whitcomb Riley moved from Main Street to a station at Ellerson (Mechanicsville) on October 15, 1975. Its Newport News section was discontinued on June 15, 1976; it was replaced with the New York City–Newport News Colonial, which stopped at Staples Mill Road. Staples Mill Road station was Amtrak's only Richmond station until 2003, when Regional (later Northeast Regional) trains serving Newport News began also stopping at Main Street.

A second island platform was added around 2009. The parking lot was doubled in size in 2018.

=== Future plans ===
In May 2019, the federal and state governments approved the DC to Richmond plan for expanded rail service between Washington and the Richmond area. This plan would include improvements to Staples Mill station: two accessible platforms, a pedestrian overpass or underpass, and replacement of the station building. All Richmond trains would stop at both Staples Mill and Main Street, after extensive track improvements. A new bridge would be built over the James River, and a rail yard constructed in South Richmond. The 2019 plan is coordinated with updates to the Southeast High Speed Rail Corridor plan.

In October 2024, the Virginia Passenger Rail Authority was awarded a $5.8 million federal grant to improve platforms and accessibility and add a platform canopy at the station.
