= South Line =

South Line may refer to:

- Glasgow South Western Line, Scotland
- Main South Line, New Zealand
- Østfold Line, Norway
- PNR South Main Line, Philippines
- Sounder South Line, Washington, United States
- South Eastern Main Line, England
- South-Link Line, Taiwan
- South Line, Chennai Suburban, India
- Main Southern railway line, New South Wales, Australia
- South Line, a former passenger line in Sydney, Australia, now split into:
  - Inner West & Leppington Line
  - T8 Airport & South Line
- South West Main Line, England
- South West Line, Chennai Suburban, India
- West South Line, Chennai Suburban, India
- South Line, Christchurch, New Zealand
- South Line, Tasmania, Australia

== See also ==
- North–South line (disambiguation)
- South Western Line (disambiguation)
- Southern Line (disambiguation)
- Southern Railway (disambiguation)
