= South West Line =

South Western Line or South West Line may refer to:

- Glasgow and South Western Railway, Scotland
- Glasgow South Western Line, Scotland
- South West Main Line, England
- South Western railway line, Queensland, Australia
- South Western Railway, Western Australia
- South West Line, Chennai Suburban, India
- South West Rail Link in Sydney, Australia
- SouthWest Service, Illinois, United States
- South West Trains, United Kingdom
- West South Line, Chennai Suburban, India

== See also ==
- South Line (disambiguation)
- West Line (disambiguation)
