= Ohio Southern Railroad =

Ohio Southern Railroad may refer to:

- Ohio Southern Railroad (1986), part of the Ohio Central Railroad System
- Ohio Southern Railroad (1881–1898), predecessor of the Detroit, Toledo and Ironton Railroad

== See also ==
- Southern Railway (disambiguation)
