= Südbahn =

Südbahn (German: Southern Railway) may refer to:

- Austrian Southern Railway, a former railway company in the Austrian Empire and Austria-Hungary
- Southern Railway (Austria), a railway line in Austria, initially operated by Austrian Southern Railway
- Southern Railway (Württemberg), a railway line in Germany

== See also ==
- Southern Railway (disambiguation)
