= Southern Line =

Southern Line may refer to:

- Main Southern railway line, New South Wales, Australia
- Southern railway line, Queensland, Australia
- Southern Line (Auckland), a suburban railway line in New Zealand
- Southern Line (Cape Town), a suburban railway line in South Africa
- Southern Line (Thailand), a railway line

== See also ==
- South Line (disambiguation)
- Southern Railway (disambiguation)
