= Southern Railway Depot (Richmond, Virginia) =

Early 20th century passenger station

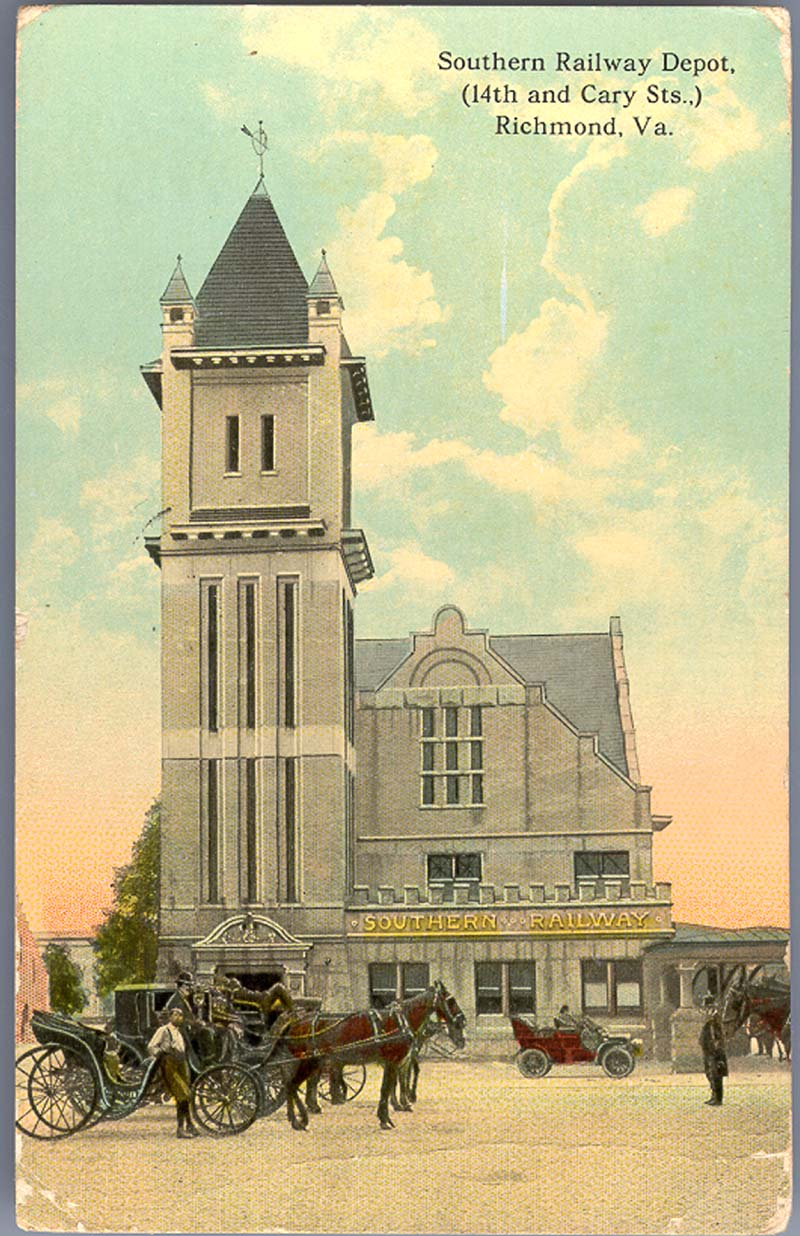
- Southern Railway passenger depot from a postcard, postmarked 1912

General information
- Coordinates: 37.5341°N 77.4327°W
- System: Former Southern Railway passenger and freight depot
- Tracks: 8

Construction
- Architect: Frank Pierce Milburn

History
- Opened: 1900
- Closed: 1914
Location

The Southern Railway Depot on 14th Street in Richmond, Virginia, was a passenger station for the Southern Railway that operated from 1900 to 1914. Another name of this depot was Mill Street Station. Previously, the Southern had operated its Richmond passenger service out of an old Richmond and Danville Railroad wooden frame depot that laid about 600 feet south of the 14th Street Depot. This depot had been constructed around 1865–1866 to replace the one built in the early 1850s and burnt in the Fall of Richmond in April 1865. The original R&D depot had been the departure station for the train carrying Confederacy Jefferson Davis and his cabinet to Danville immediately before Richmond fell to the Union Army during the Civil War.

Around the turn of century, the railroad initialized plans to replace the old R&D depot with a new one constructed of brick and granite. They hired architect Frank Pierce Milburn to design it and awarded the contract to Frederick "Fritz" Sitterding. In the railroad journal, The Railway Surgeon, an intricate description is given of the depot:

"The building will be of granite and gray pressed brick, with a green slate roof. it will have a 70-foot frontage on Mill street and 175 feet on Fourteenth street, with a 100-foot tower on the corner. The arrangement of the interior will be simple and convenient, with an entrance through a vestibule on Mill street, and beneath the tower. Ticket offices will be located at the right of the entrance, and at the north end of the waiting room and adjoining the vestibule will be situated the ladies' parlor. At the extreme south end of the waiting room will be a room for colored people, with a hallway between connecting with the baggage and express rooms. The waiting room will be 40 by 50 feet, finished in chestnut, with frescoed walls and ceilings and marble tiling floor."

Construction was finished in 1900. In 1914, the Southern decided to split its passenger services into two stations: one at Main Street Station (owned by the Seaboard Air Line Railroad and the Chesapeake and Ohio Railway), a couple blocks away from the 14th Street depot, and another at a new station on Hull Street, appropriately named Hull Street Station. As a result of this split, the 14th Street Depot was demolished and replaced by a freight depot with combined offices. The new freight depot was 40 feet wide and 480 feet long and had offices on the first floor for the first 40 feet and on the second floor for 150 feet. The remaining 440 feet on the first floor was devoted to freight warehouse space. The reason for the demolishment of the 14th Street Passenger depot was that the Southern Railway needed the additional space for freight.

The new 14th Street freight depot continued to serve the Southern until the 1980s when the railroad merged with the Norfolk and Western Railway to create the Norfolk Southern Railway. At this point, most of the freight depot was demolished except for a 166-foot section fronting on what is now Canal Street. This was redeveloped as the Southern Railway Taphouse and is a popular bar and brewery in the present day.

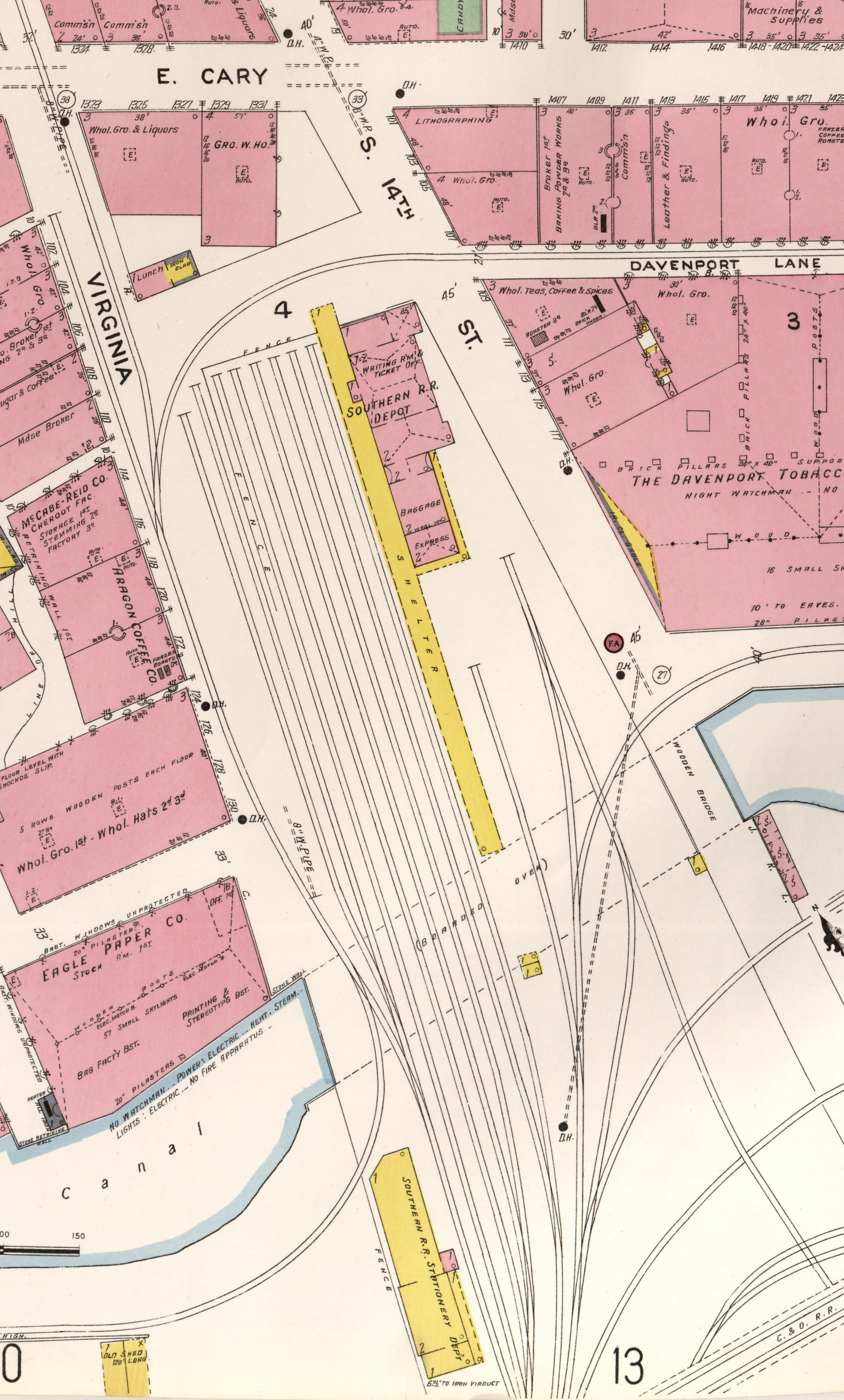
Map of the Southern Railway Richmond Passenger Depot in 1905
