= Southern Railway =

Southern Railway or Southern Railroad may refer to:

== Argentina ==
- Buenos Aires Great Southern Railway, Argentina

== Australia ==
- Main Southern railway line, New South Wales, Australia
- Southern railway line, Queensland, Australia

== Austria ==
- Austrian Southern Railway
- Southern Railway (Austria)

== Canada ==
- Canada Southern Railway, part of the New York Central Railroad
- New Brunswick Southern Railway, part of the Canadian Pacific Railway
- Quebec Southern Railway
- Southern Railway of British Columbia

== India ==
- Southern Mahratta Railway, a railway company in British India founded in 1882
- Southern Punjab Railway, India
- Southern Railway zone, India

== United Kingdom ==
- Southern (Greater Thameslink Railway)
- Southern Railway (UK), 1923–47

== United States ==
- Alabama Great Southern Railroad
- Alton and Southern Railway, Illinois
- Arkansas Southern Railroad, part of the Chicago, Rock Island and Pacific Railway
- California Southern Railroad
- Dakota Southern Railway, South Dakota
- Georgia Southern Railroad
- Illinois Southern Railway, part of the Missouri Pacific Railroad
- Indiana Southern Railroad
- Iowa Southern Railroad, part of the Wabash Railway
- Kansas Southern Railway, part of the Atchison, Topeka and Santa Fe Railway
- Louisiana Southern Railway, part of the Missouri Pacific Railroad
- Minnesota Southern Railway, part of the Chicago, Milwaukee, St. Paul and Pacific Railroad
- Montana Southern Railway
- New Jersey Southern Railroad, and New Jersey Southern Railway
- Norfolk Southern Railway, Virginia
- Southern Alabama Railroad
- Southern California Railway
- Southern Railroad of New Jersey
- Southern Railway – Carolina Division
- Southern Railway (U.S.), now part of the Norfolk Southern Railway
- Tennessee Southern Railroad, part of the Illinois Central Railroad
- Vermont Southern Railroad, part of the Boston and Maine Railroad
- Virginia Southern Railroad

== Elsewhere ==
- Southern Railway (Turkey)
- Southern Railway (Württemberg), Germany
- Southern Railways (Ukraine)
- Southern Xinjiang railway, China

== See also ==
- Südbahn (disambiguation)
- Southern Line (disambiguation)
- South Line (disambiguation)
- Great Southern Railway (disambiguation)
- Ohio Southern Railroad (disambiguation)
- Southern Railway Depot (disambiguation)
- Austrian Southern Railway Company
