= Petersburg station =

Railway station in Virginia, United States

Petersburg, VA
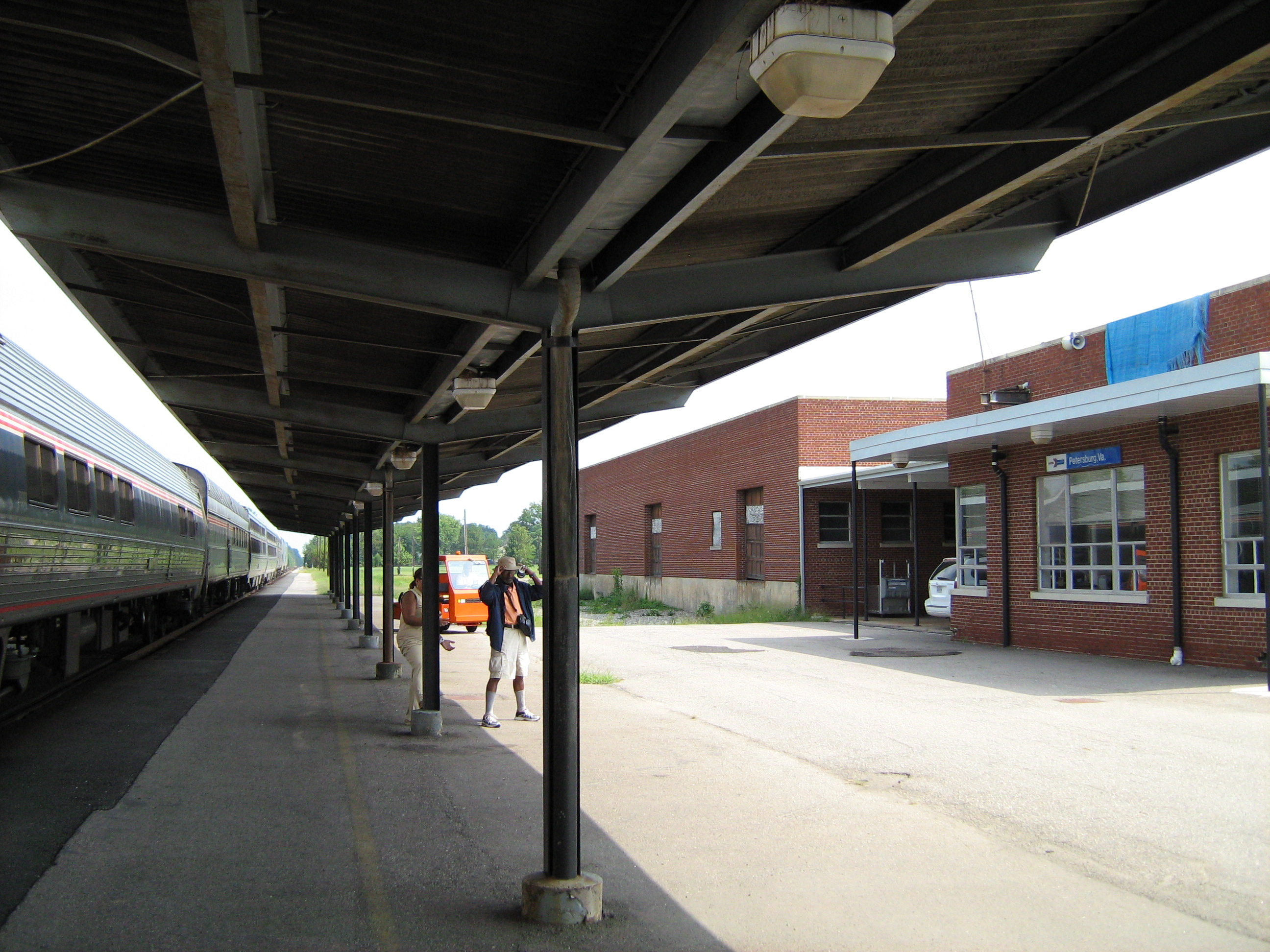
- The Silver Star at Petersburg station in August 2010

General information
- Location: 3516 South Street; Ettrick, Virginia; United States
- Coordinates: 37.2419°N 77.4287°W
- Owner: CSX Transportation
- Line: CSX North End Subdivision
- Platforms: 1 side platform
- Tracks: 2
- Connections: Petersburg Area Transit

Construction
- Parking: Yes; free
- Accessible: Yes

Other information
- Station code: Amtrak: PTB

History
- Opened: March 15, 1942
- Rebuilt: May 16, 1955

Passengers
- FY 2025: 60,480 (Amtrak)

Services
Preceding station	Amtrak	Following station
Rocky Mount toward Charlotte	Carolinian	Richmond Staples Mill Road toward New York
Rocky Mount toward Savannah	Palmetto	Richmond Staples Mill Road toward New York
Rocky Mount toward Miami	Silver Meteor	Richmond Staples Mill Road toward New York
Rocky Mount toward Miami	Floridian	Richmond Staples Mill Road toward Chicago
Norfolk Terminus	Northeast Regional	Richmond Staples Mill Road toward Boston South or Springfield
Auto Train does not stop here
Former services
Preceding station	Amtrak	Following station
Rocky Mount toward Miami	Silver Star Until 2024	Richmond Staples Mill Road toward New York
Preceding station	Atlantic Coast Line Railroad	Following station
Carson toward Tampa	Main Line	Chester toward Richmond
Location

Petersburg station (also known as Ettrick station) is an Amtrak railroad station located in Ettrick, Virginia, just outside the city of Petersburg. The station, adjacent to the campus of Virginia State University, is served by five Amtrak routes: the Carolinian, Floridian, Northeast Regional, Palmetto, and Silver Meteor. It has a brick station building and a single side platform adjacent to the two-track North End Subdivision.

Predecessors of the Atlantic Coast Line Railroad (ACL) originally had a station on West Washington Street in downtown Petersburg. The ACL built a new station a block west in 1903. Some ACL trains began using the new Union Station when it opened in 1910, and the West Washington Street station closed around 1918. In 1942, the ACL opened a new station in Ettrick on a line that bypassed downtown Petersburg. It was replaced at the same site in 1955 by the current structure.

Service passed to the Seaboard Coast Line Railroad in 1967. Former Seaboard Air Line Railroad trains began using the station in 1970. Amtrak took over service in 1971; service varied in the 1970s and gradually increased thereafter. Relocation of the station to nearby Colonial Heights was proposed in 2017 as part of the Southeast High Speed Rail project. The move was shelved in 2019 in favor of a renovation of the existing station.

== Design and services ==
Petersburg station is located in Ettrick, about 1.6 miles (2.6 km) northwest of downtown Petersburg. The one-story brick station building is 260 feet (79 m) long and 60 feet (18 m) wide. The passenger waiting room is located in the southern part of the station; the northern part is unoccupied. A single 1,200-foot (370 m)-long side platform serves the eastern track of the two-track CSX North End Subdivision. A wheelchair lift provides accessibility.

As of 2024, Petersburg station is served by five Amtrak routes with a total of six to seven daily round trips. The Carolinian, Floridian, Palmetto, and Silver Meteor each have one daily round trip. The Northeast Regional has three weekday round trips and two weekend round trips.

== History ==
=== Previous stations ===
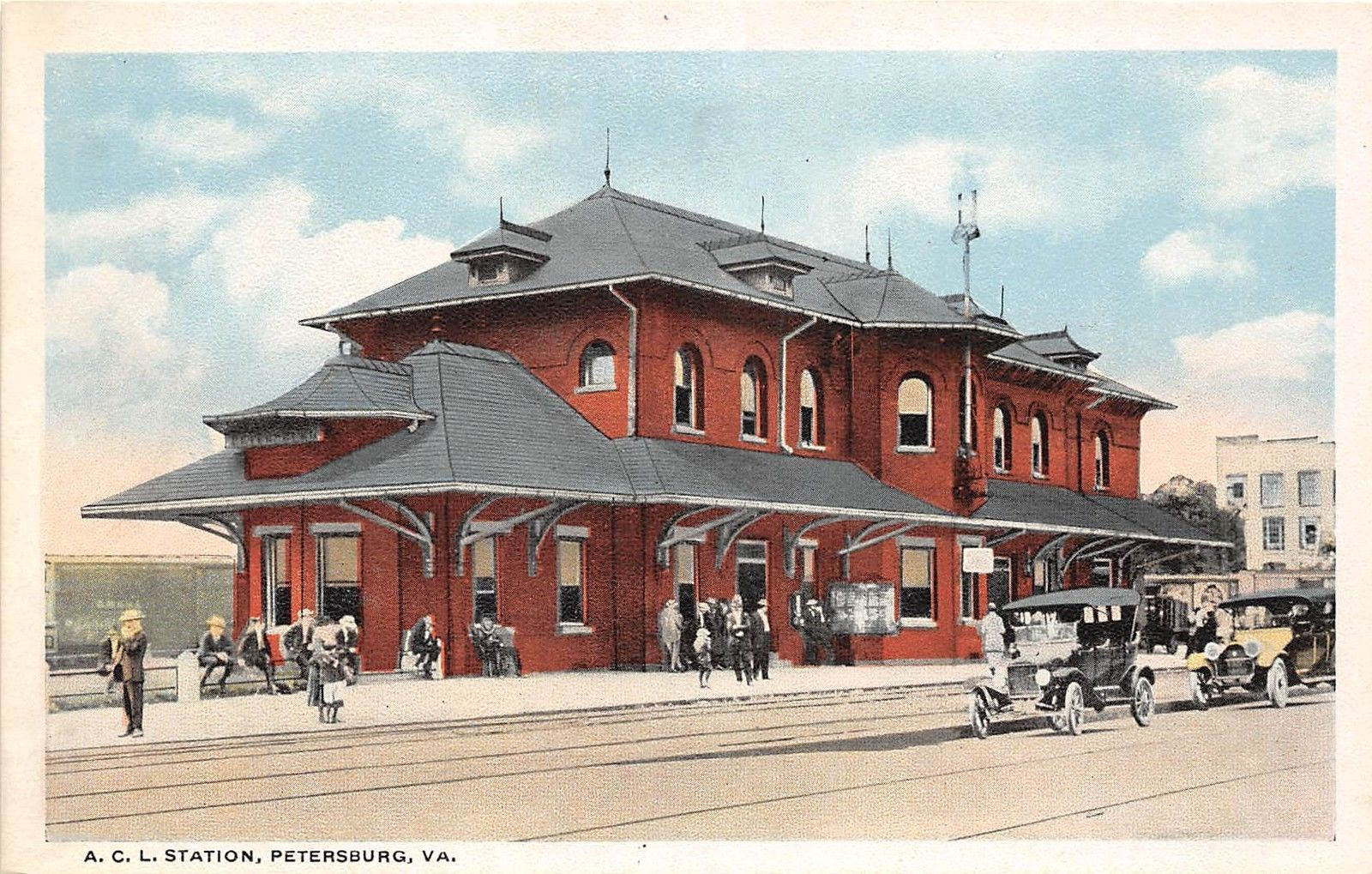
Early-20th-century postcard of the 1903-built ACL station

The Petersburg Railroad (opened 1833) and Richmond and Petersburg Railroad (opened 1838) ran north–south on a winding route through Petersburg. The two lines merged in 1898 and became part of the Atlantic Coast Line Railroad (ACL) in 1900. By the 1890s, the ACL station was located on West Washington Street on the east side of Union Street in downtown Petersburg. In 1894–95, the ACL built a "belt line" west of downtown Petersburg. It was straighter and largely double-tracked, allowing through freight and passenger trains (those not stopping in Petersburg) to bypass the congested main line, which had street running on West Washington Street.

In 1902–03, the ACL built a larger freight depot; a new passenger station was built on the west side of Union Street. The Norfolk and Western Railway (N&W) opened its Union Station near the junction with the ACL in May 1910. It included a platform for ACL trains. The ACL referred to it as "Appomattox station" to distinguish it from the West Washington Street station.

Around 1918, under the control of the wartime United States Railroad Administration, the West Washington Street station was closed to passengers and all trains used Union Station. By 1938, ACL service at Union Station included four daily Richmond–Petersburg round trips and three to four long distance trains in each direction (including the Havana Special and the southbound New Palmetto Limited). Four long-distance trains in each direction bypassed Petersburg via the belt line.

=== Ettrick station ===
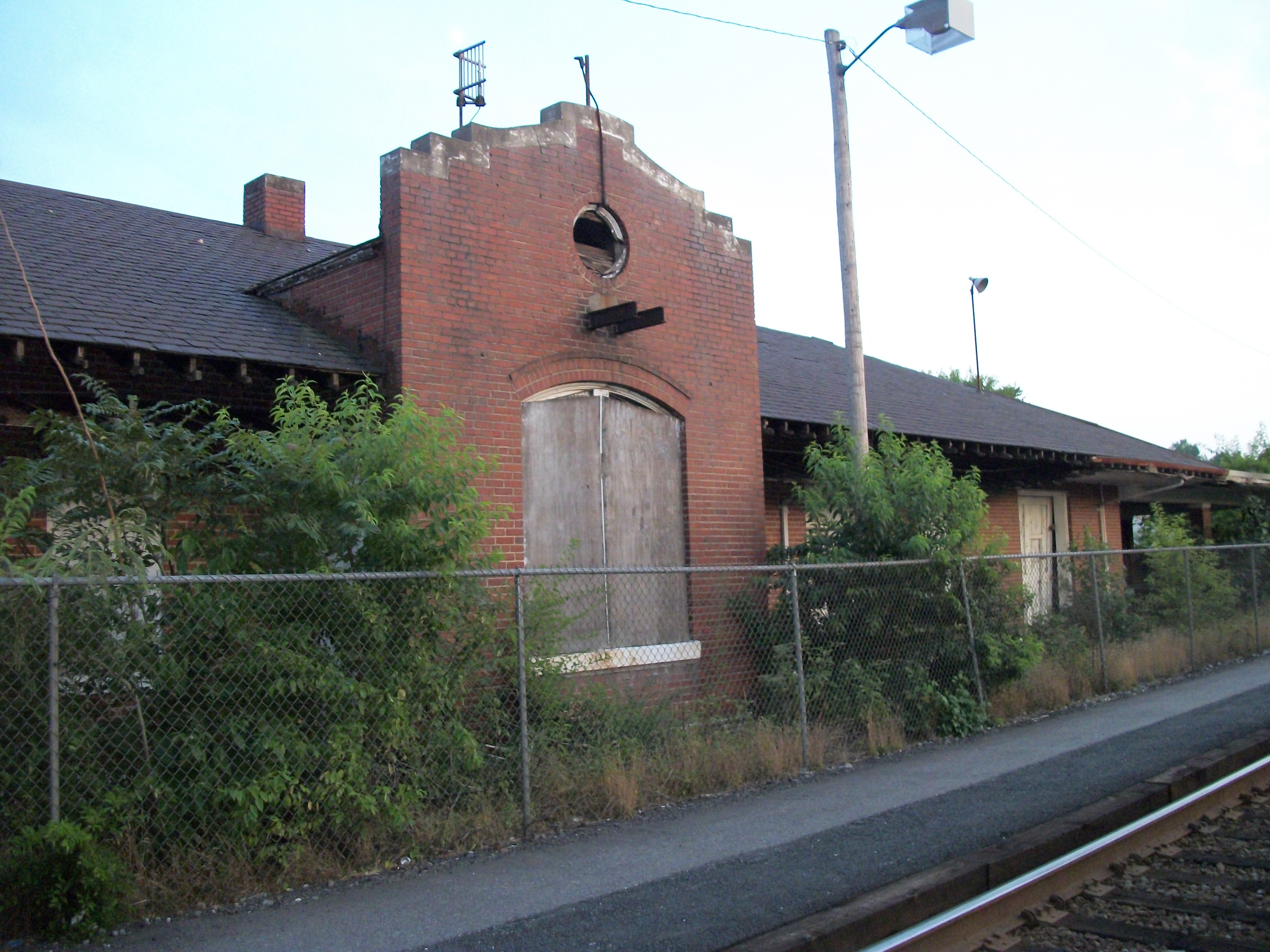
The 1942-built station in 2010

In the late 1930s, city officials and the chamber of commerce began agitating for the ACL to remove its tracks from Washington Street and to build a new station on the belt line. Construction of a new union station for the ACL, N&W, and Seaboard Air Line Railroad (SAL) west of downtown Petersburg was considered in 1940 after flooding of the Appomattox River affected Union Station.

In November 1941, the ACL began construction of a new brick station at Ettrick on the belt line. That station opened on March 15, 1942, removing passenger trains from Washington Street, though the Richmond–Petersburg trains continued to terminate at Union Station until at least 1958.

In mid-1954, the ACL began construction of a combination passenger and freight station in Ettrick, just north of the 1942-built station. The structure cost $125,000 to build, with most of the interior space for freight. Freight service was temporarily moved to the former West Washington Street station on June 1, 1954, allowing the freight house and station to be demolished for new development. (Note: Several nearby buildings were later listed on the National Register of Historic Places as the Atlantic Coast Line Railroad Commercial and Industrial Historic District.)

Freight service was moved to the new combination station around April 1955, removing trains from the West Washington Street tracks; the belt line became the mainline. Passenger service moved to the new station on May 16, 1955; the older station there was converted to a warehouse. It remained extant until at least 2012. In 2010, a bus station for Petersburg Area Transit and intercity buses opened where the West Washington Street station once stood.

The ACL and SAL merged in 1967 to become the Seaboard Coast Line Railroad. All former SAL passenger service was rerouted over the ACL through Petersburg on June 1, 1970. By December 1970, Petersburg was served by six daily round trips – the Champion, Everglades, Gulf Coast Special, Palmland, Silver Meteor, and Silver Star – and bypassed only by the Florida Special.

=== Amtrak era ===
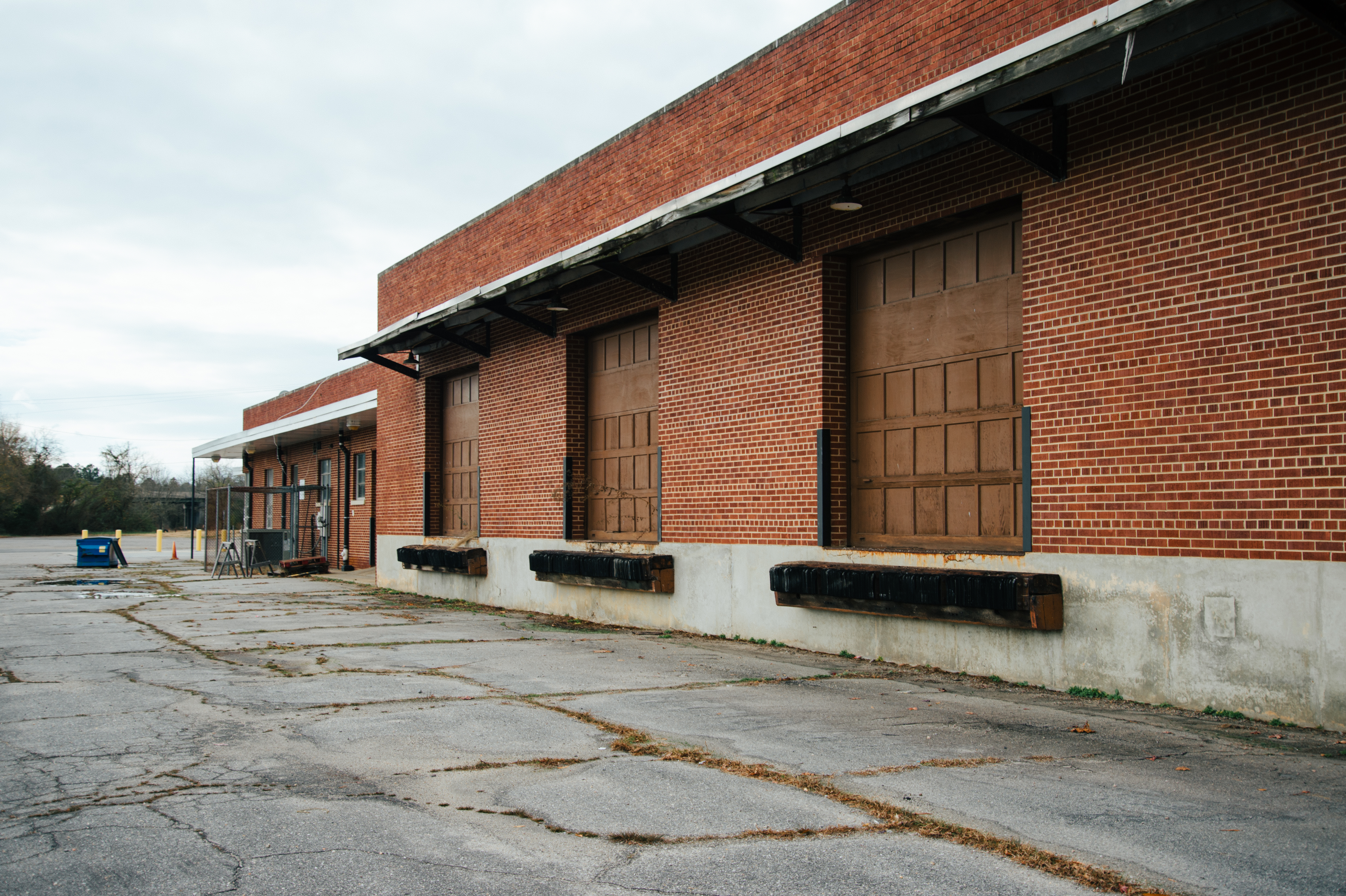
Loading docks at the 1955-built station

Amtrak took over intercity passenger rail service in the United States on May 1, 1971. It retained three Seaboard Coast Line trains through Petersburg – the Champion, Silver Meteor, and Silver Star. The Silver Meteor only served Petersburg intermittently from 1971 to 1976, but regularly thereafter. Amtrak also operated several seasonal trains in its first decade. Winter trains serving Florida (Note: The Florida Special in 1971–72, the Vacationer in 1972–73 and 1973–74, and Miamian in 1974–75) did not stop at Petersburg, but the Carolina Coast (summer 1972) and Carolina Special (summer 1973) did.

The Palmetto was introduced on June 15, 1976, giving Petersburg three year-round daily trains. After being combined during the off-season with the Silver Meteor for much of the decade, the Champion was fully merged into the Silver Meteor in 1979. Some interior renovations, including expansion of the waiting room, took place in the late 1980s. The Carolinian was added on May 12, 1990, giving Petersburg a fourth daily round trip.

Passenger service on the N&W, which had been discontinued in 1971, resumed on March 24, 1975, with the Mountaineer. It stopped in Petersburg at Union Station. On June 1, 1977, it was replaced with the Hilltopper, which stopped at Fleet Street west of downtown and used the ex-ACL route north of Union Station. The Hilltopper was discontinued on September 30, 1979, again leaving Petersburg with a single train station.

On December 12, 2012, one daily Northeast Regional round trip was extended from Richmond to Norfolk, stopping at Petersburg. A new connecting track was built south of Petersburg to allow the train to switch from the ex-ACL main line (now the North End Subdivision) to an ex-N&W line (the Norfolk District). (Note: The ex-N&W line was built around 1910 as a freight bypass for the downtown N&W line, similar to the ACL belt line.) A second weekday Northeast Regional round trip was added on March 4, 2019, and an additional daily round trip on July 11, 2022. Petersburg Area Transit began local bus service to the station in 2019. On November 10, 2024, the Silver Star was merged with the Capitol Limited as the Floridian.

=== Southeast High Speed Rail ===
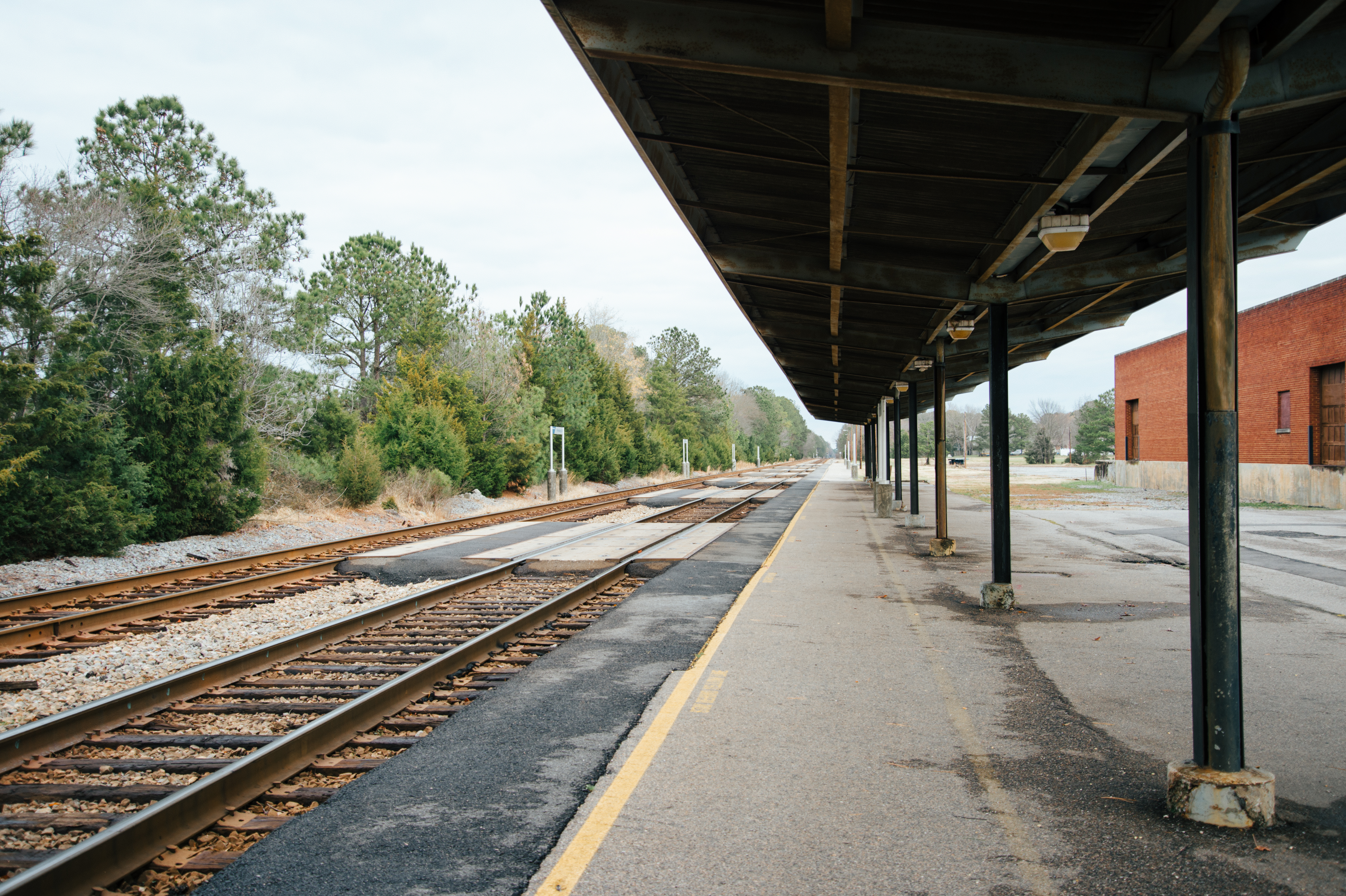
The non-accessible platform, which is planned for replacement

The Southeast High Speed Rail Corridor (SEHSR) project is planned to reactivate the ex-SAL mainline (Norlina Subdivision) between Petersburg and Raleigh, North Carolina, for passenger service. Planning for the project considered reactivation of portions of the ex-SAL route or the original ACL route through Petersburg, but they were deemed inferior to the existing route. The Burgess Connector, a connecting line south of Petersburg (originally built after the ACL/SAL merger) will be reopened to allow trains to reach the ex-SAL line. As of 2023, the Virginia portion of the reactivated line is expected to open after 2030.

The 2010 Tier 2 Draft Environmental Impact Statement noted four potential sites for a station to serve the Tri-Cities (Petersburg, Colonial Heights, and Hopewell): Colonial Heights, the existing Ettrick station, Washington Street west of downtown Petersburg, and Collier south of downtown Petersburg. That report, a 2012 recommendation report, and the 2015 Final Environmental Impact Statement (FEIS) all deferred selection of the station site to a locally-focused study. The FEIS called for a third track to be built through Petersburg.

In 2017, the Federal Railroad Administration study recommended a site at Boulevard (U.S. Route 1/301) in Colonial Heights. The decision proved controversial; in 2019, the agency suspended environmental work on the station project due to a "lack of consensus" about the site. That July, the state announced plans to spend $5.7 million to modernize the station and make it fully accessible. In June 2022, the Virginia Passenger Rail Authority (VPRA) was awarded a $6.4 million federal grant for the $10.6 million renovation project. It will include a new 850 feet (260 m)-long platform with a new canopy, interior renovations, and modifications to the parking lot. As of August 2024, construction is expected to start in 2025. The VPRA was awarded $1 million in 2024 for a study to determine longer-term plans for the station.
