= Great Southern Automobile Company =

Defunct American motor vehicle manufacturer

- Type: Automobile Manufacturing
- Industry: Automotive
- Genre: Touring Cars, Roadsters, Buses
- Founded: 1909
- Founder: Eugene F. Enslen
- Fate: Bankruptcy
- Headquarters: Birmingham, Alabama, United States
- Area served: United States
- Products: Automobiles; Automotive parts
- Number of employees: 200 (as of 1910)

The Great Southern Automobile Company was the first automobile manufacturer in the central South of the United States. It was incorporated in Birmingham, Alabama, in 1909 and manufactured automobiles, automobile parts, and buses from its plant in Ensley, where it also maintained a repair department. Its founding officers were Eugene F. Enslen, president; Ike Adler, vice-president; John Kyser, secretary and treasurer; and Eugene F. Enslen, Jr., general manager.

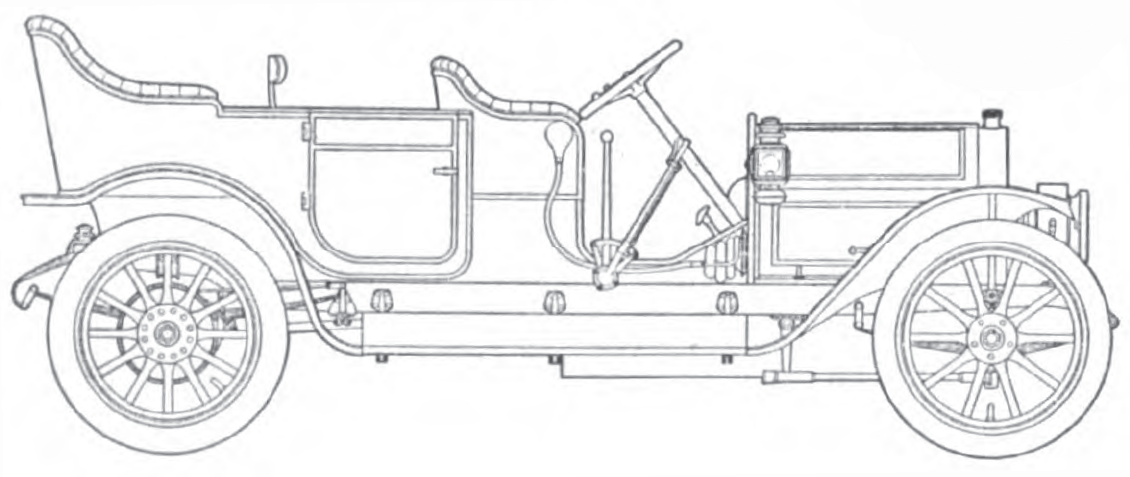
1910 sketch of the then-upcoming Great Southern 50

In early 1910, it announced a Model "50" touring car with a wheel base of 124 inches, a 5.25x6 inches bore and stroke engine, capable of 60 bhp.

In 1912, it opened salesrooms in the Empire Building, then the tallest building in Birmingham. The manager was W. O. Fields.

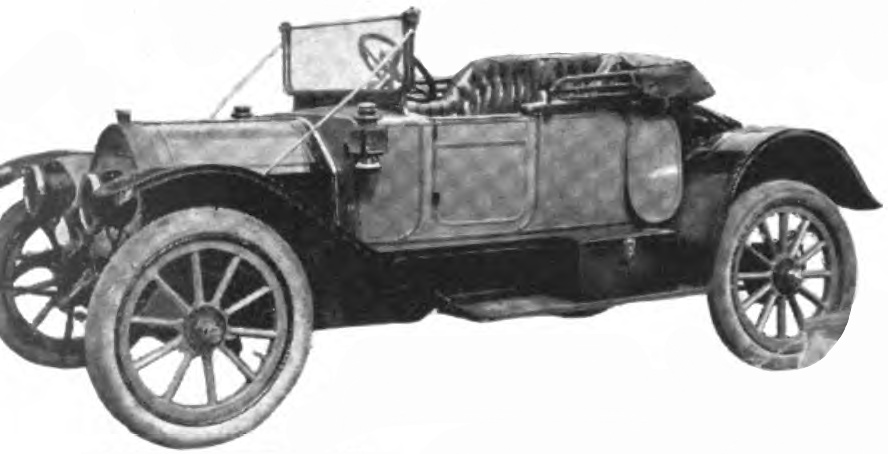
Great Southern 30 roadster two seater

In 1913, it was manufacturing two models:

- Great Southern 30, available in two-seater roadster and five-seater touring bodies for $1400.
- Great Southern 51, available in a six-seater touring body for $2100.

In 1914, it dropped the Great Southern 30, and concentrated on the manufacture of just the Great Southern 50 chassis, formerly titled the Great Southern 51. The new 50 model was a seven passenger touring body.

By 1915, it was manufacturing a chassis and body for a "one-man, pay-enter" motor bus that was 22 feet long, 8 feet 9 inches high, 7 feet 6 inches wide, rated at 2.25 tons capacity, and could carry 25 passengers.

The company went bankrupt in 1917. Alabama's other pre-1950 car manufacturers include Preston Motor's Premocar in Birmingham and Keller in Huntsville.
