= Groupe Scolaire La Résidence =

French international school in Casablanca, Morocco

- Groupe Scolaire La Résidence
- Casablanca & Fès, Morocco

Information
- Established: 1982
- Grades: Petite section through terminale

Groupe Scolaire La Résidence (GSR) is a French international school in Casablanca and Fès, Morocco. It serves petite section through terminale, the final year of lycée (senior high school/sixth form college).

It was established in 1982.
