= Danville station =

Passenger train station in Danville, Virginia, U.S.

Danville, VA
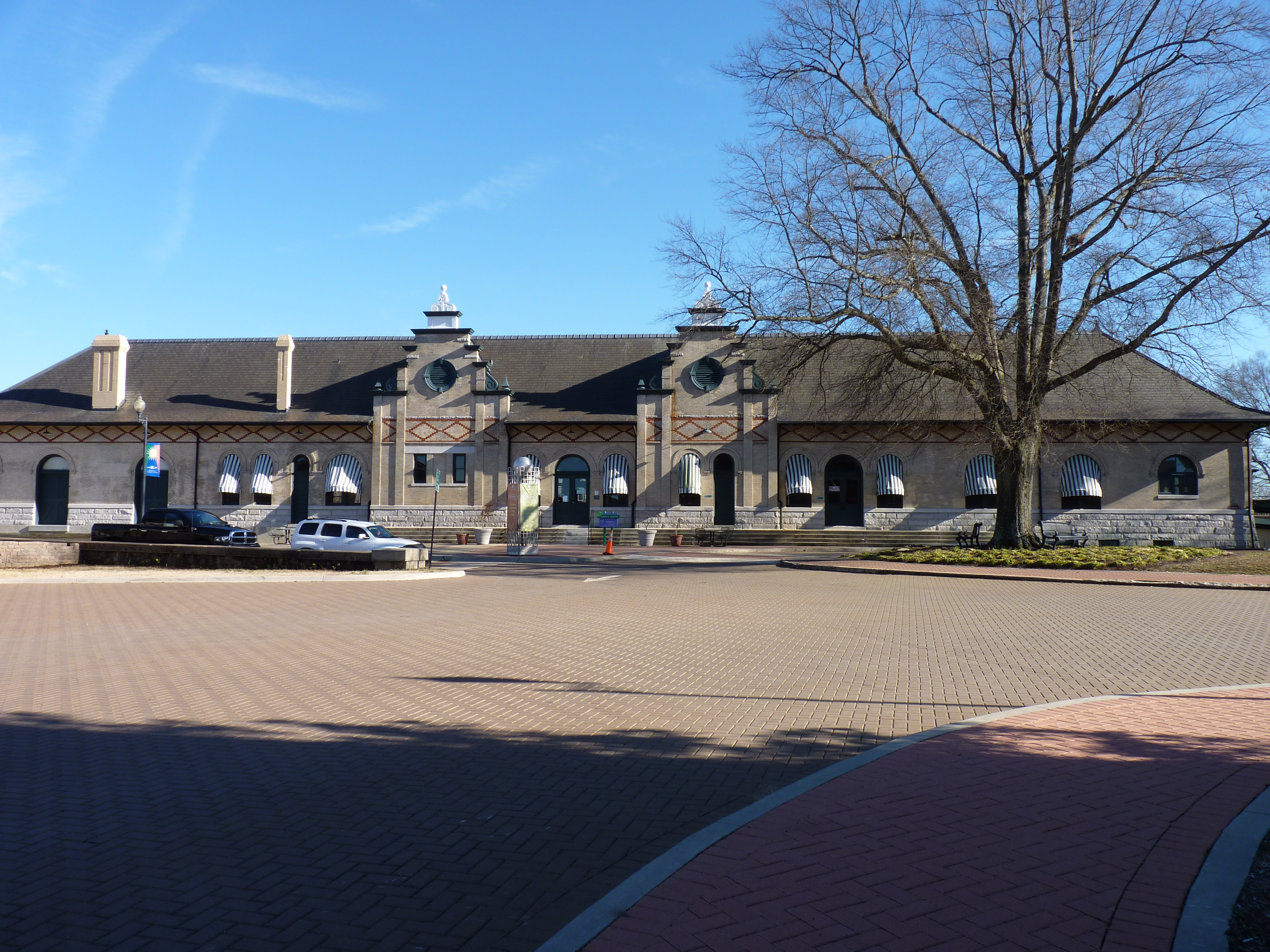
- Danville station in January 2012

General information
- Location: 677 Craghead Street; Danville, Virginia; United States
- Owner: City of Danville
- Line: Norfolk Southern Railway Danville District
- Platforms: 1 side platform
- Tracks: 1

Construction
- Accessible: Yes

Other information
- Station code: Amtrak: DAN

History
- Rebuilt: 1899, 1922, 1995

Passengers
- FY 2025: 8,324 (Amtrak)

Services
Preceding station	Amtrak	Following station
Greensboro toward New Orleans	Crescent	Lynchburg toward New York
Former services
Preceding station	Southern Railway	Following station
Stokesland toward Birmingham	Main Line	Fall Creek toward Washington, D.C.
Terminus	Danville – Richmond	Neapolis toward Richmond–Hull Street
- Danville Southern Railway Passenger Depot
- U.S. National Register of Historic Places
- Virginia Landmarks Register
- Location: Danville, Virginia
- Coordinates: 36°35′02″N 79°23′02″W
- Architect: Frank P. Milburn, R.B. Graham
- Architectural style: Renaissance
- NRHP reference No.: 95000895
- VLR No.: 108-0058-0012

Significant dates
- Added to NRHP: 1995
- Designated VLR: April 28, 1995
Location

Danville station is an Amtrak train station in Danville, Virginia, served by the daily Crescent. The 1899-built station building is listed on the National Register of Historic Places as Danville Southern Railway Passenger Depot.

== History ==
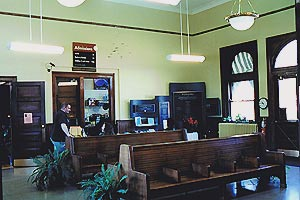
The station interior in 2002

The station was built in 1899 from plans drawn by the noted Southern Railway architect Frank Pierce Milburn. In 1915, a track expansion required that the track be moved 133 feet to the northeast. The station was jacked up on rollers, and crews used mules and stump pullers to roll the building. The move was done so skillfully that not a single brick was cracked.

In 1922, the building was almost destroyed by fire that broke out during a raging snowstorm, which prevented firefighting teams from reaching it. Southern Railway rebuilt the building to its original specifications, except for the spire that once topped the station. With the decline of passenger use of railroads, the building fell into disuse. For years it was closed and Amtrak passengers had to walk through a tunnel and wait for trains on an open platform between the tracks.

In 1993 the station was closed to passenger service temporarily and bought by the City of Danville. In 1995, the station was listed on the National Register of Historic Places. The same year, a group of local civic leaders sought federal ISTEA funding and local contributions to renovate the station. In addition to serving Amtrak passengers, part of the station is now used as a campus of the Danville Science Center. This is the first satellite facility of the Science Museum of Virginia, coincidentally also a former train station. The station is also used for the Danville Farmer's Market.
