= Broad Street Station (Richmond) =

Railway station in Richmond, Virginia, United States

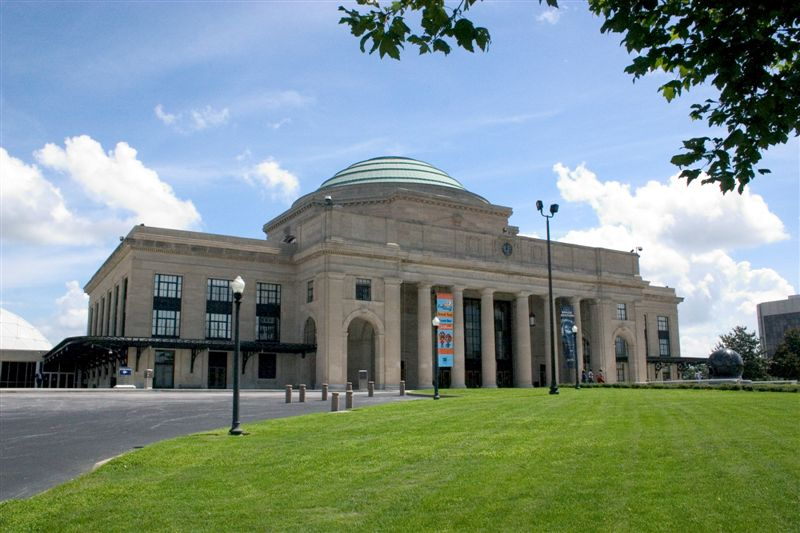

General information
- Location: 2500 West Broad Street; Richmond, Virginia 23220; United States
- Coordinates: 37.561111°N 77.465833°W
- System: Former Atlantic Coast Line and Amtrak station
- Tracks: 3 (remaining); 8 (old)

History
- Opened: 1917
- Closed: 1975 (for passenger rail service)

Former services
| Preceding station | Amtrak | Following station |
|---|---|---|
| Petersburg toward St. Petersburg | Champion | Alexandria toward New York |
| Jacksonville toward Miami | Silver Meteor | Alexandria toward New York |
| Petersburg toward Miami | Silver Star | Fredericksburg toward New York |
| Preceding station | Atlantic Coast Line Railroad | Following station |
| Centralia toward Tampa | Main Line | Terminus |
| Preceding station | Richmond, Fredericksburg and Potomac Railroad | Following station |
| Terminus | Main Line | Acca toward Washington, D.C. |
- Broad Street Station
- U.S. National Register of Historic Places
- Virginia Landmarks Register
- Architect: John Russell Pope
- NRHP reference No.: 72001518
- VLR No.: 127-0226

Significant dates
- Added to NRHP: February 23, 1972
- Designated VLR: November 16, 1971
Location

Broad Street Station (originally Union Station) was a union railroad station in Richmond, Virginia, United States, across Broad Street from the Fan district. The building is now used by the Science Museum of Virginia.

== History ==
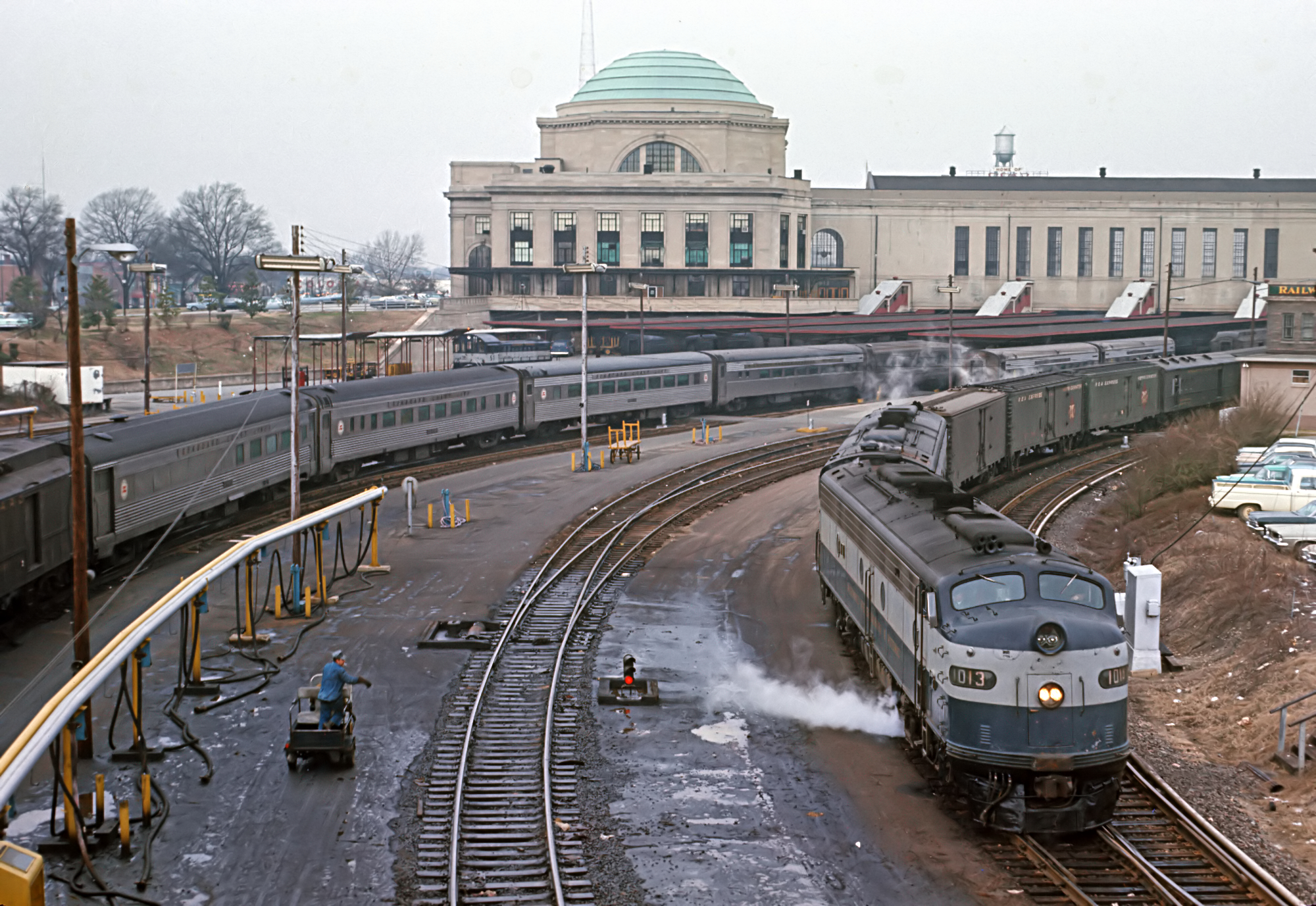
The Silver Comet, and The Silver Star at left at Broad Street Station on March 9, 1969

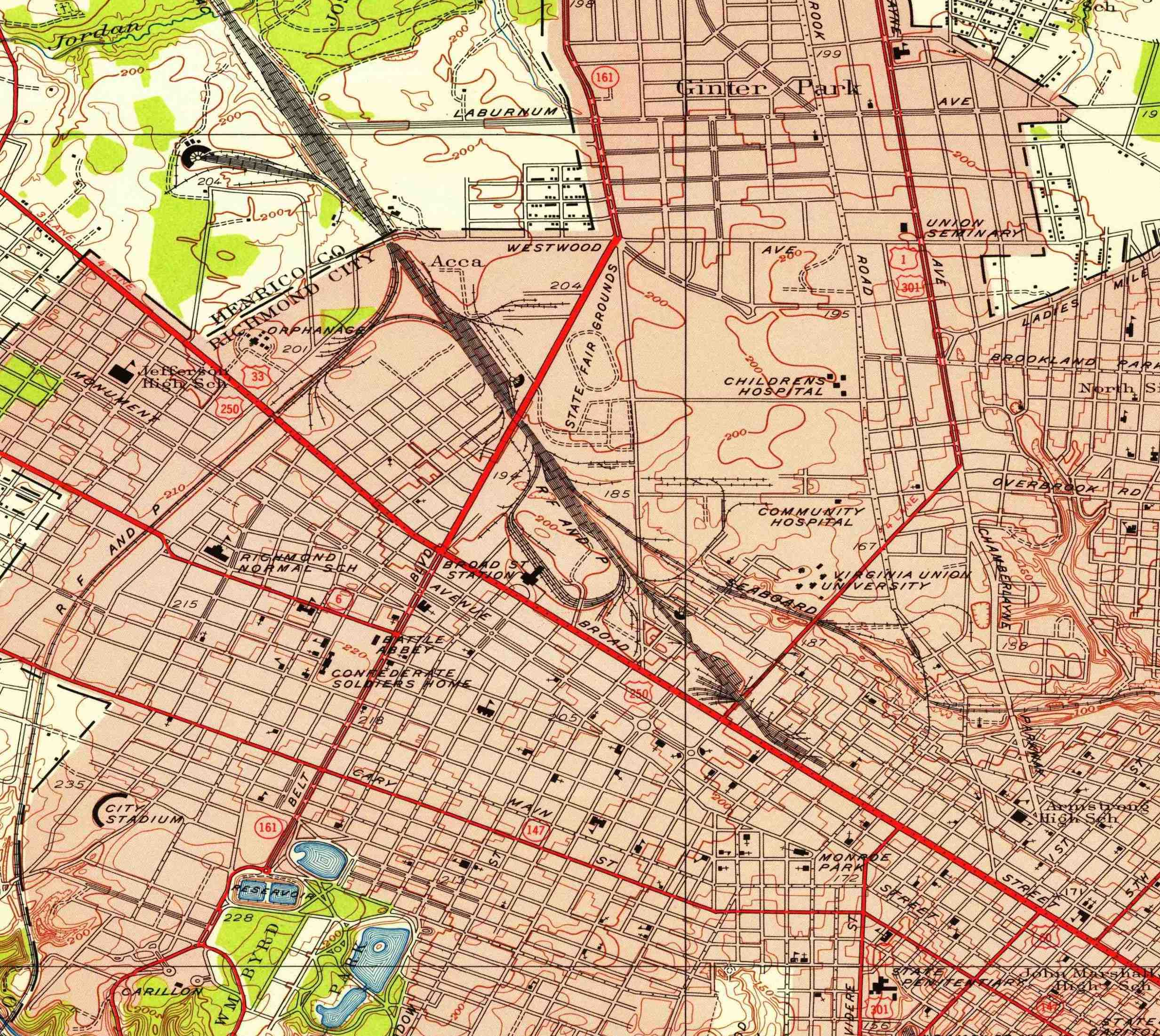
Map of Broad Street Station in 1934

Broad Street Station's story begins with the establishment of the Richmond, Fredericksburg and Potomac Railroad (RF&P) in 1834 to build and operate a railroad between Richmond and the Potomac River. The RF&P's Richmond station was initially located at 8th and Broad Streets and its tracks went up the middle of Broad Street until turning to the northwest at Harrison Street. Two years later, the Richmond and Petersburg Railroad (R&P) was founded to operate a railroad between Richmond and its sister city 22 miles to the south, Petersburg. The R&P's station was located at 8th and Byrd streets. In the years before the Civil War, passengers and freight were not directly interchanged on one line between the various railroads but instead had to be hauled in wagons from one railroad depot to the other.

During the war years, this problem was exacerbated to a degree such that the railroad executives decided to establish new connection railroads between their lines to ease the difficulties of transferring passengers and freight. With this goal in mind, the Richmond, Fredericksburg and Potomac and the Richmond and Petersburg Railroad Connection Company transfer railroad was chartered in 1866. This line ran from the R&P's station up Byrd Street and then turned northwards at Belvidere Street until it connected with the RF&P's line at Broad Street, where a new station named Elba was built (named for the plantation that stood at the site in the early 19th century; the plantation was named for the island Napoleon was first exiled to after 1814. At the time, the distance from Richmond was much further than the present day).

As railroad traffic and the city's westward expansion steadily increased over the second half of the 19th century, the pressure on the transfer line grew and by the late 1880s, the decision was made to build a "belt" line around the city for the freight trains to bypass the busy streets of the city and tight curves and steep grades of the transfer railroad line. In 1904, the railroads bought the Virginia State Agricultural Society Fairgrounds, which were located a mile west of Elba off of Broad Street. In 1913, an international competition was held to choose the design of the new railroad station and eventually John Russell Pope's neoclassical style plan was selected. Pope was a noted architect of government buildings, homes, and monuments but had never before designed a commercial building. He was assisted in his efforts by Harry Frazier, the chief engineer of the Chesapeake and Ohio Railway. For three years thereafter, the city debated whether the station should be built in the proposed location and it was only in April 1916 that the station's final plans were submitted for approval. A unique feature among the new station was its balloon loop which allowed trains coming in from the north to pull in and then loop around to return north.

Construction began on January 6, 1917 with a projected timeline of 18 months and cost of $1,000,000. Due to America's entry into World War I, progress on the station slowed to a halt and the contractor ended up declaring bankruptcy. After finding a new contractor and adjusting the design plan, the station was finished two years later at three times the initial cost. The first train pulled out of the station at 1:07 PM on January 6, 1919. Although the station was officially named "Union Station of Richmond", the "Broad Street Station" name derived from the local street became more popular.

Service to Broad Street Station peaked during World War II when it averaged 57 trains a day. The post war days proved to be significantly detrimental to the passenger rail business, resulting in the creation of Amtrak in 1971. At Amtrak's inception, the station was served by the Champion, Silver Meteor, and Silver Star (all inherited from the Seaboard Coast Line Railroad, successor to ACL and SAL). Eventually, the Seaboard Air Line Railroad (SAL), which had formerly used Richmond's other union station, Main Street Station, switched to Broad Street Station. Broad Street Station was added to the National Register of Historic Places on February 23, 1972.

Passenger service to the station ceased in 1975, when on November 15 at 4:58 AM, the last train pulled out of the 56 year old landmark. Passenger trains were then routed to a new depot style station in the western suburbs named Staples Mill Road. By 1976, Broad Street Station became the new home of the Science Museum of Virginia, which remains in the substantially remodeled and expanded building.

== See also ==
- History of Richmond, Virginia
- Transportation in Richmond, Virginia
