= Science Museum of Virginia =

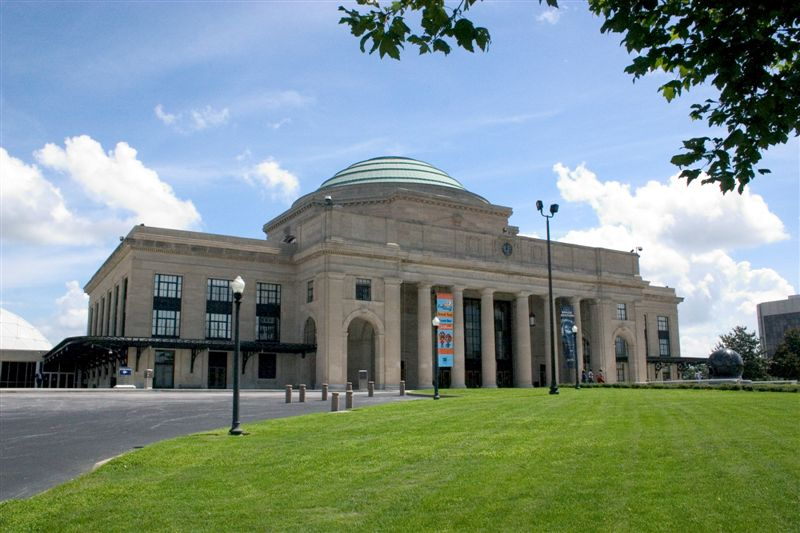
- Established: 1970
- Location: 2500 West Broad Street, Richmond, Virginia
- Coordinates: 37°33′40″N 77°27′57″W
- Type: Science museum
- Website: http://www.smv.org/

The Science Museum of Virginia is a science museum located in Richmond, Virginia. Established in 1970, it is an agency of the Commonwealth of Virginia. It is housed in the former Broad Street Station, built in 1917.

== History ==
=== Early proposals ===
In 1906, the Virginia General Assembly approved funds for the construction of a simple "exhibits center" to display mineral and timber exhibits being assembled for the Jamestown Exposition of 1907. After the exposition ended, many of the items were moved to Richmond's Capitol Square. The "State Museum" as it came to be known opened in 1910, adding displays of natural historical specimens from a variety of state agencies to its collection over the years.

In 1942, the General Assembly created a study commission to consider establishing an official State science museum. That commission succeeded in endorsing the creation of a "Virginia Museum of Science" in 1943. The fiscal restraints and pressing concerns of World War II – and the recession which followed it – prevented the General Assembly from taking further action. In 1946, the General Assembly suspended work on a State science museum awaiting appropriate space and funds.

By 1964, the General Assembly resumed the project of a "State Museum". A new study was commissioned, and once again, the establishment of a "museum of science, archaeology, and natural history" was proposed, but this measure died in the committee. Shortly thereafter, the museum's displays and collections in the basement of the state's Financial Building were gradually disassembled and their collections were dispersed to various State universities.

However, the closing of the "State Museum" galvanized the state's scientific community, and between 1965 and 1967, the Virginia Academy of Sciences, led by Dr. Roscoe D. Hughes, vigorously lobbied Virginia's Governor Mills E. Godwin, to sponsor legislation in the General Assembly to finally establish the State Science Museum.

=== Creation ===
Enabling legislation was drafted and approved by the General Assembly, and on July 1, 1970, the Science Museum of Virginia was established.

Over the next several years, the museum attempted to find an empty storefront, warehouse, or other space which could be used as a temporary home. Friends of the museum pressed the state to allow it to move into part of the old Broad Street Station, which had recently been purchased from the railroad company by the state and was destined for the wrecking ball. Broad Street Station was built by the Richmond, Fredericksburg and Potomac Railroad (RF&P) in 1917 in the neoclassical style by the architect John Russell Pope. Although the station also served the trains of the Atlantic Coast Line Railroad (ACL), the Norfolk and Western Railway (N&W), and eventually the Seaboard Air Line Railway (SAL), much of the stock of the RF&P was owned by the State of Virginia's Retirement System, dating to a period before the American Civil War when it was a major investment in Virginia's future. The museum staff occupied Broad Street Station on January 22, 1976.

On January 6, 1977, Governor Godwin, in his second term, presided over the dedication of the Science Museum's first exhibit gallery, The Discovery Room. The event celebrated the fifty-eighth anniversary and rebirth of Broad Street Station and the culmination of over seventy years of effort to establish the Science Museum of Virginia.

=== Exhibit history ===
A remodeled and greatly expanded Aquarium opened in 1981. That same year, the world's largest analemmic sundial, located in the museum's parking lot, was dedicated. It would later be listed in the Guinness Book of World Records.

In 1982 the museum introduced Crystal World, the largest and most comprehensive exhibit in the world on the subject of crystallography. Also introduced was the Solar Challenger, the world's first successful solar airplane, which had just completed a world tour to celebrate its first solar-powered flight from Paris to London.

In 1983 the museum dedicated its new Universe Planetarium & Space Theater, now called The Dome. The Theater's Evans & Sutherland Digistar planetarium projector was the world's first computer/video planetarium projection system and the first that could take visitors on simulated trips through both time and space. Its film projection system was only one of a handful around the world capable of showing 70 mm OMNIMAX films. The theaters' sound system featured over one hundred individual speakers and generated enough power to simulate earthquakes and rocket lift-offs. The seventy-six-foot domed screen of the theater itself was then the world's largest. It is still the largest screen in Virginia to this day.

In 2003 the museum unveiled the Grand Kugel, the world's largest kugel ball at a cost of $1.5 million. The Grand Kugel was originally carved from an 86-ton block of South African black granite. It was 8 feet, 8.7 inches in diameter, and it floated on a base of granite. Shortly after installation, the Grand Kugel began to crack. The crack eventually spread through the sphere, rendering it unfloatable. A replacement kugel ball was installed in October 2005. The original kugel is still on display behind the museum.

In the former train loading area which has been redeveloped, large static displays now include:

- Chesapeake and Ohio Railway (C&O) steam locomotive and tender, Kanawha class # 2732
- Richmond, Fredericksburg and Potomac Railroad (RF&P) "Car One" business car
- Aluminaut, the world's first aluminum submarine, designed by and built for Richmond-based Reynolds Metals Company in the 1960s, also notable for helping recover a "lost" U.S. atomic bomb in 1966.

In 2014 the museum upgraded its five-story theater, The Dome, with a new digital projection system.

In 2016 the museum opened a new permanent exhibition, Speed, with an SR-71 Blackbird suspended from the ceiling. The Blackbird was relocated from the Virginia Aviation Museum near the Richmond International Airport.

In 2017 the ambitious exhibition Da Vinci—Alive the Experience opened to the public. This travelling exhibition of the art and science of Leonardo da Vinci was developed by Grande Exhibitions in Australia, under the auspices of the Commune di Roma, Commune di Firenze and Citta di Venezia, with the assistance of Pascal Cotte of Lumiere Technology, France.

=== Affiliated museums ===
In addition to the Broad Street location, the Danville Science Center in Danville, Virginia is affiliated with the Science Museum of Virginia.

== Exhibits ==
TBA.

=== Special exhibits ===
- Body Worlds: Animal Inside Out - Part of Gunther von Hagens's series of Body Worlds exhibitions that includes sculptures of plastinated animal specimens such as a gorilla, a giraffe, an elephant, an octopus, an ostrich, a caribou, a camel, a squid, a shark, a great white shark holding a seal in his mouth, a cheetah standing upright on his hind legs, a lion pouncing on an oryx from behind, a bear standing upright on his hind legs, a horse, a cow, a bull, a yak, a sheep, a goat, and a winged unicorn, to name a few.
