= Effects of Hurricane Isabel in North Carolina =

Hurricane Isabel
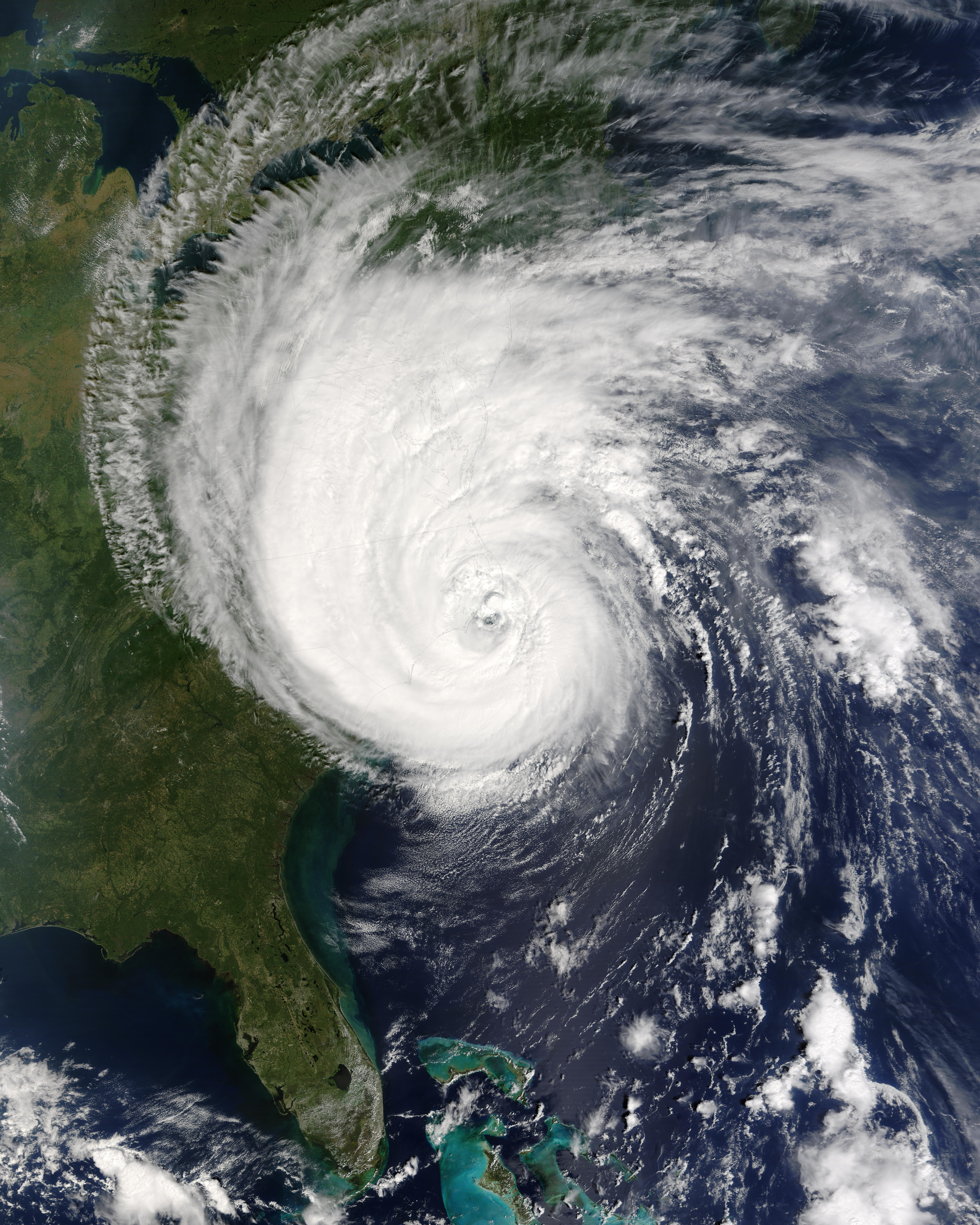
- Hurricane Isabel approaching North Carolina's Outer Banks

Meteorological history
- Date: September 18, 2003

Category 2 hurricane
- 1-minute sustained (SSHWS/NWS)
- Highest winds: 105 mph (165 km/h)
- Lowest pressure: 957 mbar (hPa); 28.26 inHg

Overall effects
- Fatalities: 1 direct, 2 indirect
- Damage: $450 million (2003 USD)
- Areas affected: Outer Banks, eastern North Carolina
- Part of the 2003 Atlantic hurricane season
- Effects: United States; North Carolina; Virginia; Maryland and Washington, D.C.; Delaware; Other wikis: Commons: Isabel images

In North Carolina, the effects of Hurricane Isabel were widespread, with the heaviest damage in Dare County. The hurricane made landfall in the Outer Banks of North Carolina on September 18, 2003. There, storm surge flooding and strong winds damaged thousands of houses. The storm surge produced a 2,000 feet (610 m) wide inlet on Hatteras Island, isolating Hatteras by road for two months. Several locations along North Carolina Highway 12 were partially washed out or covered with debris. Hurricane Isabel produced hurricane-force wind gusts across eastern North Carolina, knocking down trees and power lines. About 700,000 residents lost power due to the storm, although most outages were restored within a few days. The hurricane killed three people in the state – two due to falling trees, and the other a utility worker attempting to restore electricity. Damage in the state totaled $450 million (2003 USD, $788 million 2026 USD).

The National Hurricane Center issued a hurricane watch, and later warning, for the state's coastline in advance of the hurricane's landfall. Local officials issued evacuation orders for 18 counties, along with various flood warnings. In the aftermath of the hurricane, President George W. Bush declared a state of emergency for 26 counties in the state, which allocated federal resources to the state. Utility crews from nearby states helped restore power. The United States Geological Survey dredged sand to restore the breach on Hatteras Island, with traffic restored about two months after the hurricane.

== Preparations ==
On September 14 – four days before Hurricane Isabel made landfall – most computer models predicted that Isabel would strike the east coast of the United States between North Carolina and New Jersey. The National Hurricane Center consistently forecast a landfall on North Carolina. Forecasters initially predicted a landfall in the northeastern portion of the state, which became more accurate as the hurricane neared land. Strong confidence in Isabel's final landfall prompted the National Hurricane Center to issue a hurricane watch for the entire North Carolina coastline about 50 hours before Isabel struck land. About 12 hours later, the National Hurricane Center issued a hurricane warning from Cape Fear to the North Carolina/Virginia border, with a tropical storm warning extending southward to South Carolina. The Newport Weather Forecast Office warned for the potential of flash flooding. The office began preparing for the hurricane one week before landfall, and brought additional staff members to assist with hurricane related duties.

On September 16, officials issued a voluntary evacuation for portions of four counties and one entire county. By around 24 hours before landfall, mandatory evacuations were ordered for eight counties, including the state's coastal counties from Cape Fear to the North Carolina/Virginia border. Despite being under a mandatory evacuation, 57% of Outer Banks residents chose not to leave, as well as 77% of residents in storm surge-prone areas of the Pamlico Sound; this was based on a survey taken after the hurricane. Residents who evacuated their homes cited the hurricane's strength and track, as well as statements from officials, as the main reasons for leaving. Evacuees utilized the house of a friend or relative, or a public shelter. Issues related to the evacuations included traffic problems, stalled cars along roads, inadequate route signing, and flooded or damaged roads. By the morning of the hurricane's landfall, 65 shelters were prepared with a capacity of 95,000 people. The American Red Cross prepared 100 feeding vehicles in staging areas, and deployed two mobile kitchens each with the capacity to provide 10,000 meals per day. Additionally, five Southern Baptist Convention kitchens were on standby, in total being able to provide 20,000 meals per day.

== Impact ==
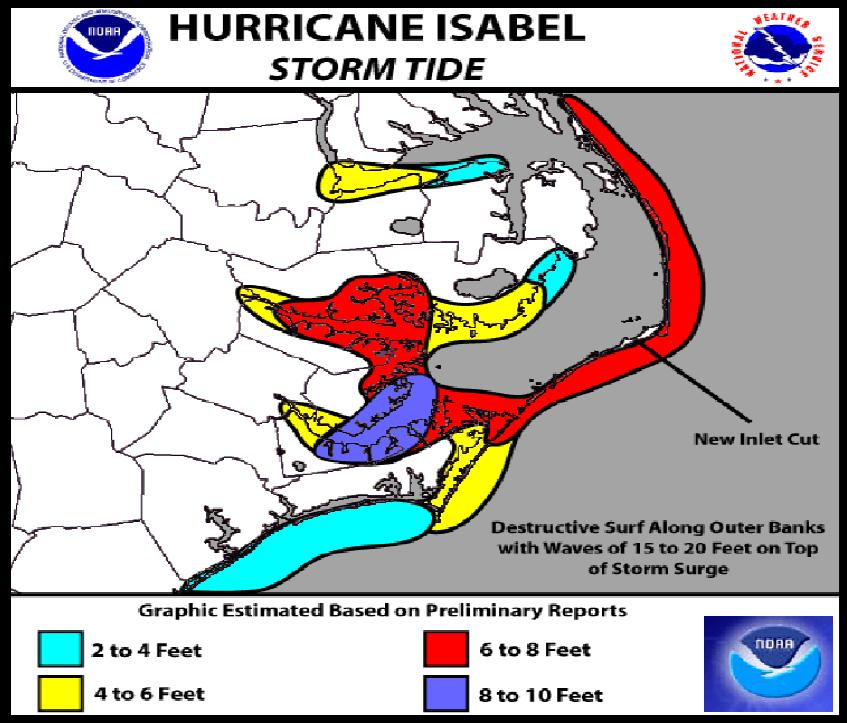
Storm tides related to Isabel in the state

Hurricane Isabel produced hurricane-force wind gusts throughout eastern North Carolina. The winds downed hundreds of trees, leaving about 700,000 people without power across the state. Damage from the hurricane totaled about $450 million (2003 USD, ($788 million 2026 USD)). Three people were killed in the state – a utility worker attempting to restore electricity and two by falling trees.

=== Outer Banks ===
Hurricane Isabel first began affecting North Carolina about 15 hours before it struck land. Upon making landfall along the Outer Banks, the hurricane produced strong waves of 15 to 25 feet (4.6 to 7.6 m) in height and a storm surge of about 6 to 8 feet (1.8 to 2.4 m). Storm tides along the coast peaked at 7.7 feet (2.3 m) in Cape Hatteras, though the total could be higher there due to the tide gauge being destroyed by the hurricane. Rough surf and storm surge caused overwash and severe beach erosion throughout the Outer Banks, with flooding in Ocracoke reportedly being up to waist-high.

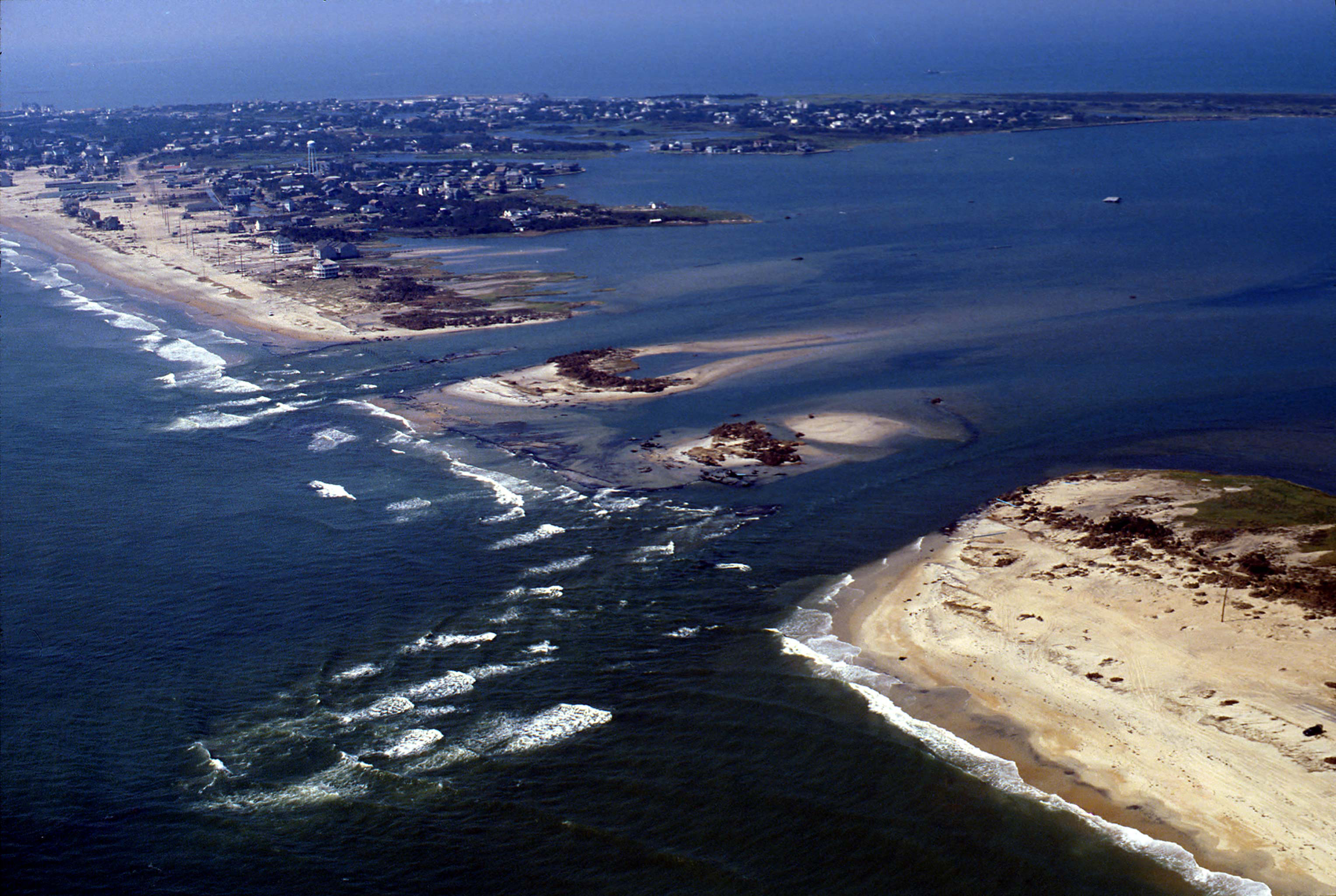
Damage to the Barrier Islands after Hurricane Isabel (USGS)

The high waters washed out a 2,000 feet (610 m) portion of Hatteras Island between Hatteras and Frisco, creating a new inlet unofficially dubbed Isabel Inlet. The break was 15 feet (4.6 m) deep in areas, consisting of three distinct channels. The new inlet washed away all utility connections to Hatteras Village, including power lines and water pipes, as well as dunes, three houses, and a portion of North Carolina Highway 12. The storm surge and waves from Isabel resulted in another breach between Hatteras and Hatteras Inlet, in an area without roads or houses. The breach nearly became an inlet, though it was not deep enough for a constant water flow; it had little impact on residents. In addition to the floodwaters, Isabel produced an estimated 4 inches (100 mm) of rain throughout most of the Outer Banks, with Duck reporting a peak of 4.72 inches (120 mm). Wind gusts in association with the hurricane peaked at 105 mph (169 km/h) in Ocracoke, with several other locations reporting hurricane-force gusts.

Wind and water damage across the Outer Banks was extensive, with monetary damage in Dare County estimated at $350 million (2003 USD, ($613 million 2026 USD)). Strong waves and the storm surge from Hurricane Isabel knocked 30–40 houses and several motels off of their pilings. Two families who did not evacuate were nearly swept out to sea when their home was destroyed; they reached safety despite local rescue being unable to reach them. The rough waves damaged piers in Nags Head, Rodanthe, and Frisco, with three completely destroyed. Several locations along North Carolina Highway 12 were partially washed out or covered with debris, and 15 feet (4.6 m) sections of pavement on both sides of a bridge near Ocracoke were washed away. Strong waves destroyed a beach access ramp. Several thousand homes and businesses were damaged by the passage of the hurricane, but no deaths or injuries were reported in the Outer Banks.

=== Southeast North Carolina ===
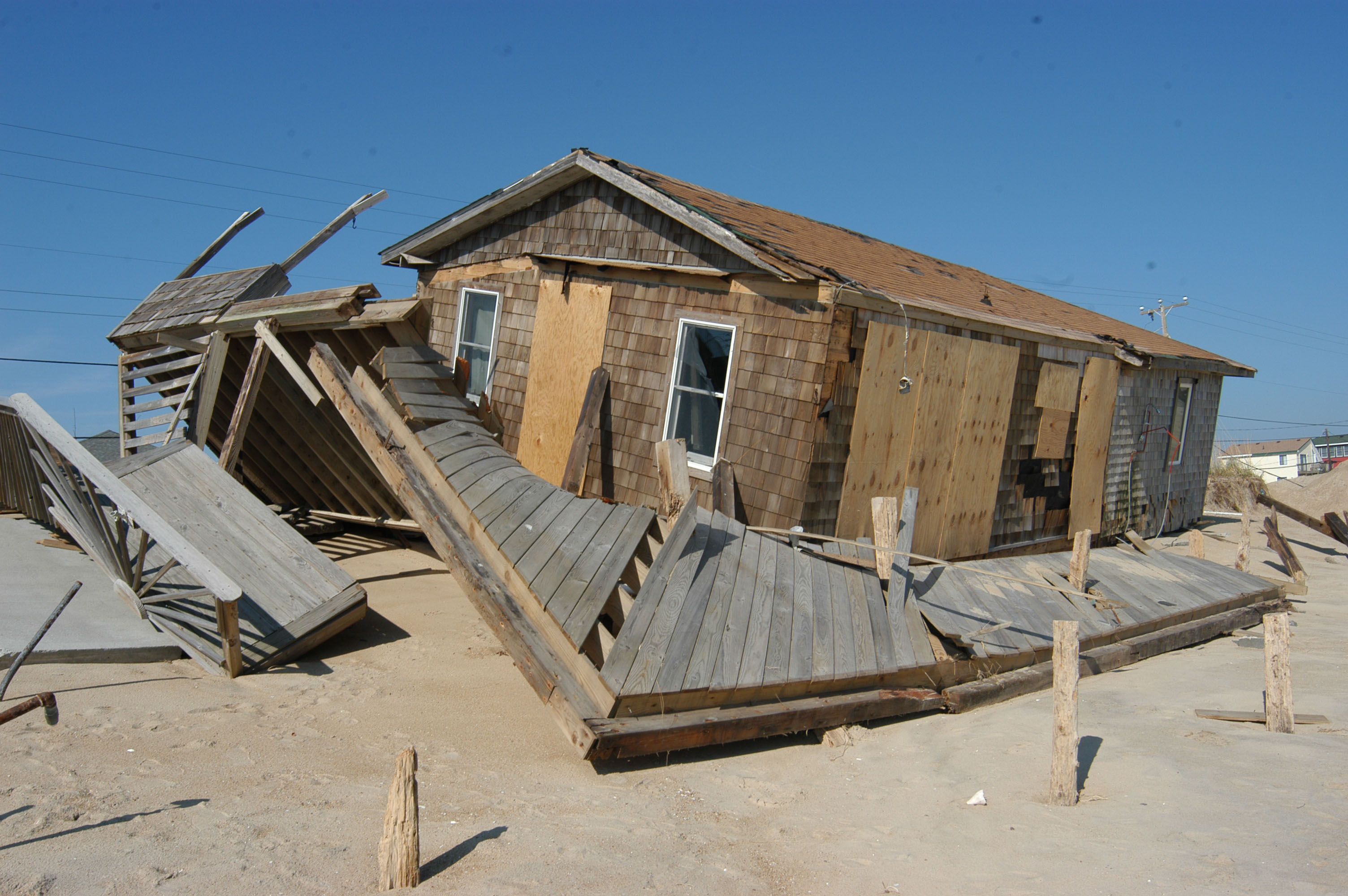
Destroyed house on the Outer Banks

Southwest of where Isabel moved ashore, Isabel's effects were lighter than in the Outer Banks. Sustained winds along the coast reached 45 mph (72 km/h) at the Wilmington International Airport, with gusts to 66 mph (106 km/h) at a port facility in Wilmington. The large circulation of Isabel dropped moderate rainfall across the area, peaking at 4.51 inches (115 mm) in Whiteville. Weather radars estimated over 5 inches (130 mm) of precipitation fell in portions of New Hanover County. The rainfall collected into ponds roadways, though no severe flooding was reported. Storm tides were generally around 1 foot (0.30 m) above normal, though Wilmington reported a storm tide of 3.22 feet (0.98 m). Rough waves resulted in moderate beach erosion near Cape Fear and minor erosion along eastward-facing beaches north of Cape Fear.

Damage was minor in southeast North Carolina. Moderate winds inflicted isolated shingle and siding damage along barrier islands. The winds downed several trees, some onto cars and houses. Brief power outages were also reported. Beach erosion damaged a bridge in Bald Head Island. In Chowan County, a business parking lot was under several feet of water due to flash flooding. One person died in Carteret County while trying to restore electricity.

=== Inland ===
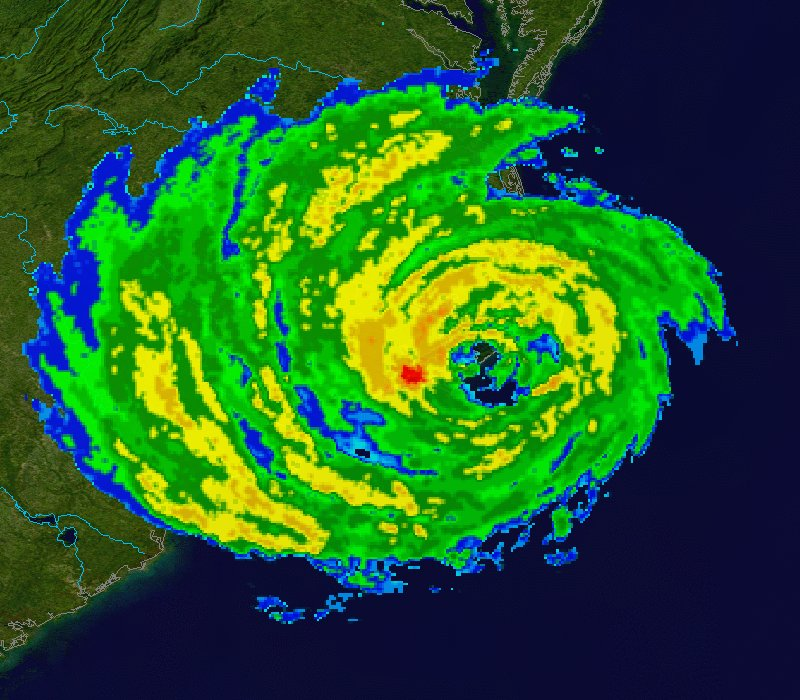
Radar image of Isabel making landfall

Isabel produced strong winds throughout inland areas of eastern North Carolina. Plymouth, located 75 miles (121 km) from the hurricane's landfall, reported gusts to 95 mph (153 km/h). Sustained winds were lighter, with only a few locations receiving tropical storm strength winds. Tropical storm force wind gusts were reported as far inland as Lumberton, where gusts reached 52 mph (84 km/h). The passage of the hurricane resulted in moderate rainfall of up to 6.02 inches (153 mm) in Havelock. Upon making landfall, Isabel produced moderate to severe storm surges along the Pamlico and Neuse Rivers, with a location in Craven County reporting a storm tide of 10.5 feet (3.2 m) above normal.

The strong storm surge produced significant flooding in Harlowe and Oriental. Several other locations also reported flooding of streets and low-lying areas. The rise of water flooded many homes in Craven County and the eastern portions of Carteret and Pamlico counties. Emergency personnel rescues people who had not evacuated and became trapped by storm surge flooding. Eyewitnesses reported high velocity, waist deep water moving homes, trailers, and other objects many yards inland. As the water retreated, these objects were then dragged back towards the water. A 5 to 8 foot (1.5 to 2.4 m) storm surge struck the western portion of the Albemarle Sound, with significant surge flooding occurring to the west of Edenton. There, the surge destroyed four homes, two of which were moved up to 20 feet (6.1 m) off their concrete block foundations. Nearly 60 percent of all homes and business in Chowan County suffered some structural damage due to wind, many of which were the result of large falling trees. One woman died when a tree fell on her vehicle in Chowan County.

== Aftermath ==
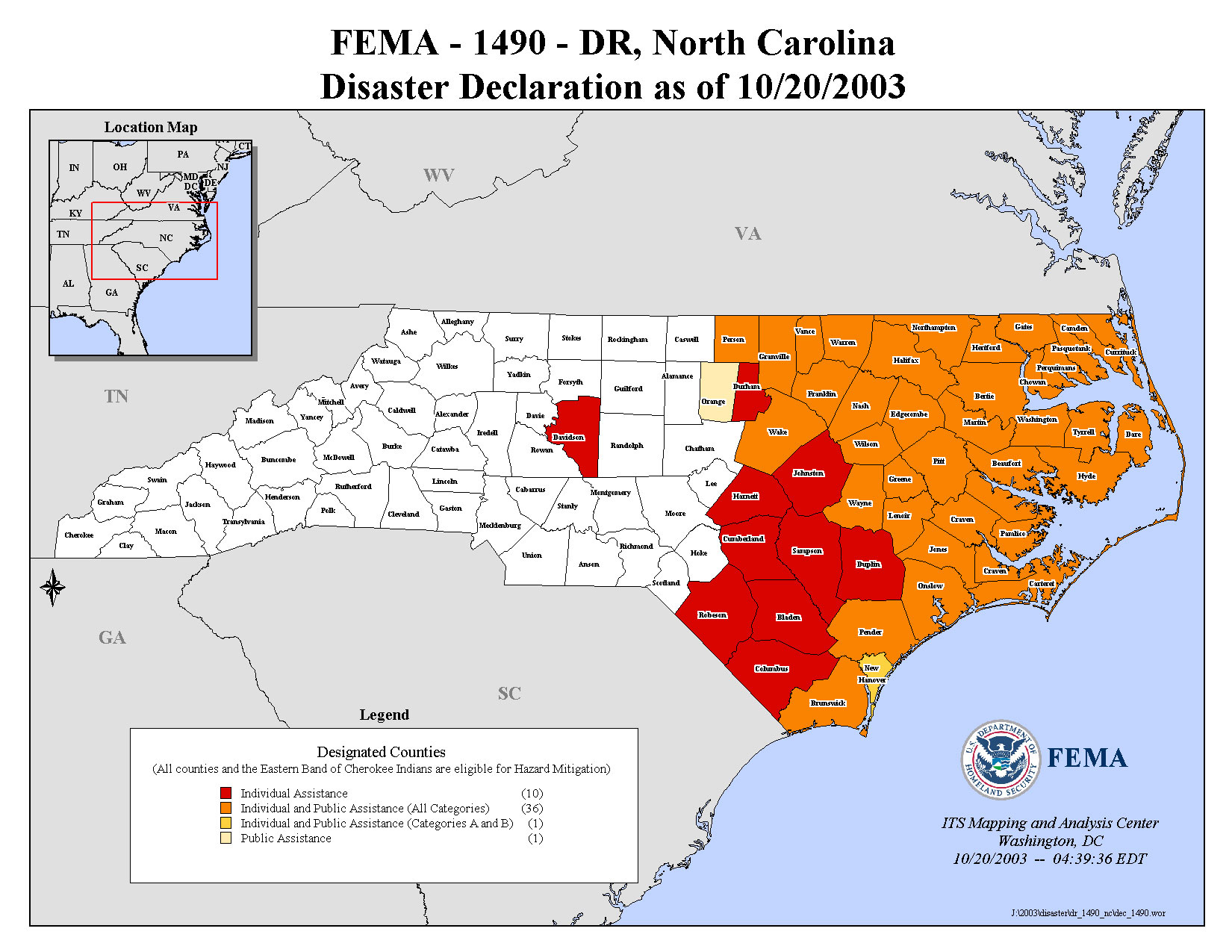
Counties declared as Disaster Areas

Due to its impacts, the name "Isabel" was retired following its usage in 2003, meaning its name will not be used again for an Atlantic hurricane.

Hundreds of residents were stranded in Hatteras following the formation of the new inlet created by rising waters. Many parts of North Carolina Highway 12 were partially washed out, damaged, or reduced one lane, which slowed recovery efforts and the return of homeowners in the Outer Banks. The ferry between Hatteras Island and Ocracoke Island was temporarily halted due to damage after the hurricane, though a small passenger ferry remained available for Hatteras Village residents and emergency workers. Non-residents were barred from being on the Outer Banks for two weeks after the hurricane. After the ban was lifted, visitors walked nearly 1 mi (1.6 km) to see the new Isabel Inlet. Officials considered building a bridge or ferry system across the new inlet, which were dropped in favor of pumping sand and filling the inlet. This was despite opposition from coastal geologists who stated that the evolution of the Outer Banks is dependent on inlets from hurricanes. Dredging operations began on October 17, using sand from the ferry channel to the southwest of Hatteras Island; this choice minimized impact to submerged aquatic vegetation. On November 22, about two months after the hurricane struck, Highway 12 and Hatteras Island were reopened to public access. On the same day, the ferry between Hatteras and Ocracoke was reopened. The breach on the southern end of Hatteras Island was filled in with sand.

Hardware stores experienced great demand for portable generators, chain saws, dehumidifiers, and air movers following the passage of the hurricane. Utility crews from across the country came to the state to assist in returning power, though power outages persisted for several days. Over 2,500 utility members worked, in some cases around the clock, to restore the power. One power company restored power to 68% of its affected customers by the day after Isabel passed through the area. By four days after landfall, 83,000 customers were without power, down from its peak of several hundred thousand.

Hours after Isabel made landfall, then-President George W. Bush issued a major disaster declaration for 26 North Carolina counties. This was later expanded to 47 counties in the state. The order allocated federal funds for the long-term recovery of hurricane-stricken residents and business owners, as well as providing federal funds for the state and local governments to pay 75 percent of the eligible cost for debris removal and emergency services related to the hurricane, including requested emergency work undertaken by the federal government. The order also allowed for the use of federal personnel, equipment and lifesaving systems and the delivery of heavy-duty generators, plastic sheeting, tents, cots, food, water, medical aid and other essential supplies and materials for sustaining human life. By four days after the emergency declaration, assistance checks were first mailed and used by residents to pay for what was not covered by their insurance.

By four days after landfall, FEMA served around 68,000 meals to displaced families. More than a dozen disaster recovery centers were initiated throughout the state. FEMA provided 125,000 pounds of ice in the first few days, and prepared 200,000 pounds of ice and 180,000 liters of water for the following week for the remaining communities without water. By six days after Isabel struck the state, all hospitals were opened and all roads excluding North Carolina Highway 12 were passable due to emergency crews clearing roads with debris. By 12 weeks after the hurricane passed through the state, 54,425 residents applied for federal assistance, with disaster aid totaling $155.2 million (2003 USD, ($272 million 2026 USD)).

== See also ==
- List of retired Atlantic hurricane names
- List of North Carolina hurricanes (2000–present)
