= Effects of Hurricane Isabel in Maryland and Washington, D.C. =

Hurricane Isabel
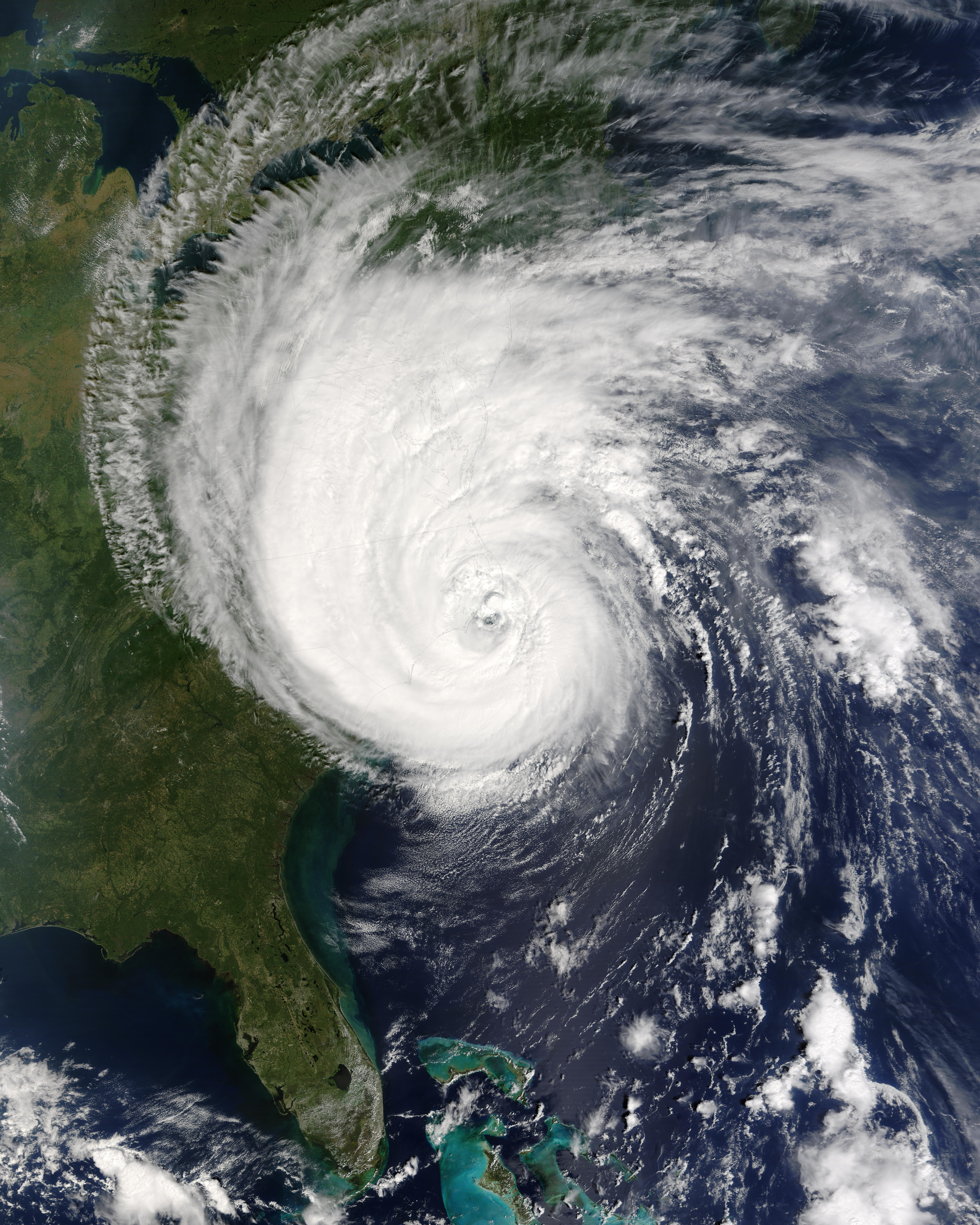
- Isabel making landfall in North Carolina on September 18

Tropical storm
- 1-minute sustained (SSHWS/NWS)
- Highest winds: 60 mph (95 km/h)
- Lowest pressure: 988 mbar (hPa); 29.18 inHg

Overall effects
- Fatalities: 1 direct
- Damage: $820 million (2003 USD)
- Areas affected: Maryland, Washington, D.C.
- Part of the 2003 Atlantic hurricane season
- Effects: United States; North Carolina; Virginia; Maryland and Washington, D.C.; Delaware; Other wikis: Commons: Isabel images

In Maryland and Washington, D.C., the effects of Hurricane Isabel were among the most damaging from a tropical cyclone in the respective metropolitan area. Hurricane Isabel formed from a tropical wave on September 6, 2003, in the tropical Atlantic Ocean. It moved northwestward, and within an environment of light wind shear and warm waters, it steadily strengthened to reach peak winds of 165 miles per hour (266 km/h) on September 11. After fluctuating in intensity for four days, Isabel gradually weakened and made landfall on the Outer Banks of North Carolina with winds of 105 miles per hour (169 km/h) on September 18. It quickly weakened over land and became extratropical over western Pennsylvania the next day.

On September 19, Tropical Storm Isabel passed through extreme western Maryland, though its large circulation produced tropical storm force winds throughout the state. About 1.24 million people lost power throughout the state. The worst of its effects came from its storm surge, which inundated areas along the coast and resulted in severe beach erosion. On the Eastern Shore, hundreds of buildings were damaged or destroyed, primarily in Queen Anne's County from tidal flooding. Thousands of houses were affected in Central Maryland, with severe storm surge flooding reported in Baltimore and Annapolis. Washington, D.C., sustained moderate damage, primarily from the winds. Throughout Maryland and Washington, damage totaled about $820 million (equivalent to $1.4 billion in 2024), with only one fatality due to flooding.

== Preparations ==
While Isabel was still over the western Atlantic Ocean as a Category 5 hurricane, forecasters predicted the storm would move northwestward and within five days be at a position 130 miles (210 km) east-southeast of Ocean City, Maryland, as a 115 miles per hour (185 km/h) major hurricane. By four days before Isabel made landfall, most computer models predicted Isabel to make landfall between North Carolina and New Jersey. On September 16, about two days before the hurricane struck land, the National Hurricane Center issued a hurricane watch for the southern region of the Maryland coastline on the Chesapeake Bay. Later that day, a tropical storm watch was issued for the eastern Maryland coastline, which was upgraded to a tropical storm warning by about 24 hours before landfall.

Officials recommended the citizens on Smith Island to evacuate on the day before the hurricane making landfall, the only evacuations for the Eastern shore of Maryland. Mandatory evacuations were ordered for low-lying and other specific areas in Calvert, St. Mary's, and Charles counties, and the residents in six homes were asked to leave in Howard County. Officials recommended that residents in flood areas of Baltimore County evacuate, and some in the city of Baltimore left spontaneously due to flooding. Evacuation rates were low throughout the Maryland coastline, with the highest rate being in the southernmost counties on the western shore. The primary reason for people staying was due to the track of the hurricane. Between 20% and 33% of those who participated in an evacuation survey said they had concerns about being caught on roadways while trying to evacuate as the storm arrived, with similar numbers expressing concern about being able to return to their homes if they evacuated. Of those who left, most went to the house of a friend or family member, with two-thirds to three-fourths going to destinations in their own neighborhood or county. Most did not evacuate until the day before or the day of landfall. In most areas, the public response to the evacuation orders was normal to fast, with traffic during the evacuation described as light to normal. The most significant problems experienced during the evacuation were downed trees, inadequate signage, flooded roads, or stalled cars. In all, 3,080 people evacuated their homes in preparation for Hurricane Isabel. Boats, trucks, and school buses helped more than 1,000 people evacuate the Inner Harbor of Baltimore, as well.

Anthony A. Williams, the mayor of Washington, D.C., declared a state of emergency. In Washington, preparations began several days prior to the arrival of the hurricane, including placing sandbags in flood-prone areas. Many people, including non-emergency government personnel, were told to stay home. Most people in the district took shelter by the time the hurricane passed through the area, and the streets across the city were largely empty. President George W. Bush along with Abdullah II of Jordan were evacuated from the city to the presidential retreat at Camp David. Most United States Congress representatives and members of the Department of Defense also left the city. Many buildings, including some federal, were shut down. All three airports in the Baltimore-Washington Metropolitan Area were closed, with flights into the capital cancelled or diverted. Many train routes were canceled or delayed, and the Washington Metro and Metrobus systems were closed entirely. Workers at the National Zoo prepared by moving animals inside and lowering water levels.

== Impact ==
=== Eastern Shore ===
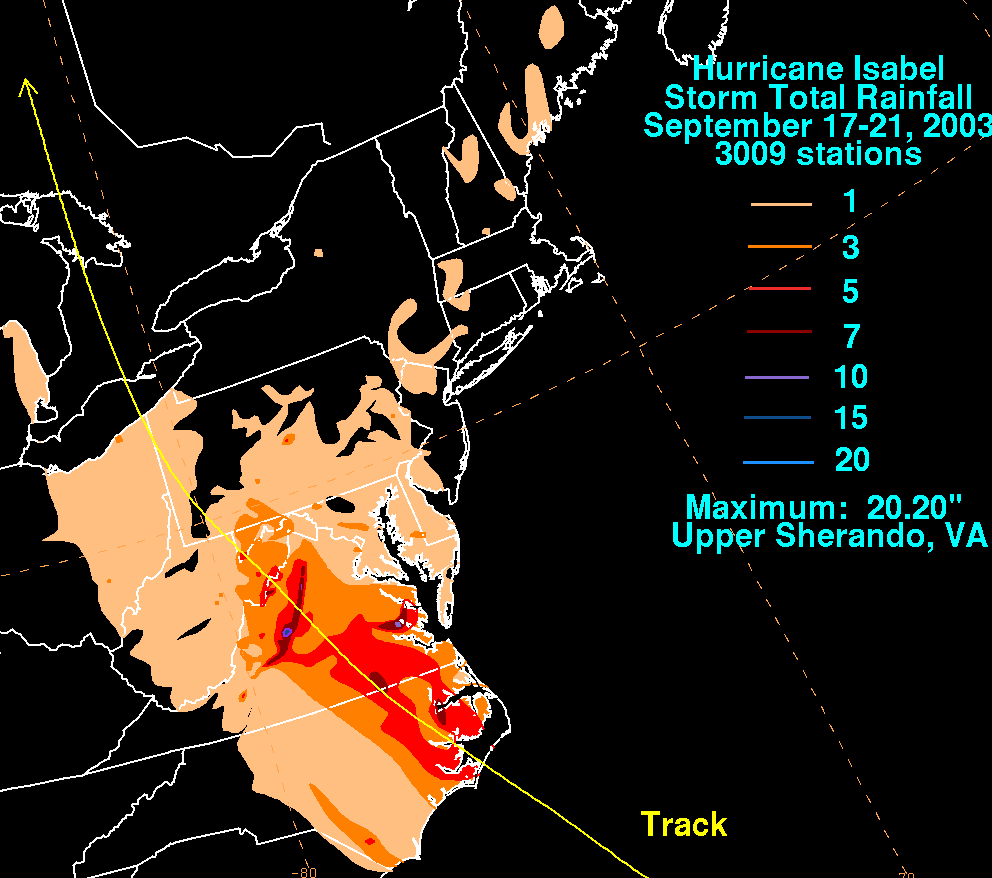
Rainfall from Hurricane Isabel

On the Eastern Shore of Maryland, Hurricane Isabel produced a storm surge peaking at 8 feet (2.4 m) on the Chesapeake Bay in Hoopers Island and 6.5 feet (2.0 m) on the Atlantic coast in Ocean City. The track of the hurricane to the west funneled into the bay and was so strong it negated the normal tide cycle in the bay. Tolchester Beach recorded a record-breaking high tide of 7.91 feet (2.41 m) above mean low water. Rainfall in the Maryland portion of the Delmarva Peninsula reached 3.2 inches (81 mm) in Steeles Neck. The large circulation of the hurricane produced strong winds across the area, including maximum sustained winds of 52 miles per hour (84 km/h) and a gust of 66 miles per hour (106 km/h) in Cambridge.

Tidal flooding from the storm surge forced residents to evacuate near the bay. Tidal flooding was reported in and around Rock Hall, Chestertown, Skinners Neck, Piney Neck, and Cliffs City, and was carried along the Chester River slightly inland. The flooding destroyed or damaged over 100 homes, vehicles, and boats, and also destroyed the Romancoke pier, one of the pre-Bay Bridge ferry landings that was still in use as a fishing pier at the time. The flooding also severely damaged eleven marinas, three restaurants, four hotels, one boatbuilding business, and one marine railway. In Queen Anne's County, the hurricane destroyed 37 homes, greatly damaged 151, and moderately damaged 192, with damage totaling $37 million (equivalent to $63.24 million in 2024). The damage was mainly due to the tidal flooding, though four homes were destroyed due to falling trees. Moderate wind gusts knocked down numerous trees, tree limbs, and power lines, leaving about 65,750 homes and businesses without power, half of which occurred in Cecil County. The resulting power outage was described as one of the worst in the history of Conectiv Energy. Damage in the Eastern Shore of Maryland totaled about $50 million (equivalent to $85.5 million in 2024).

=== Central Maryland ===
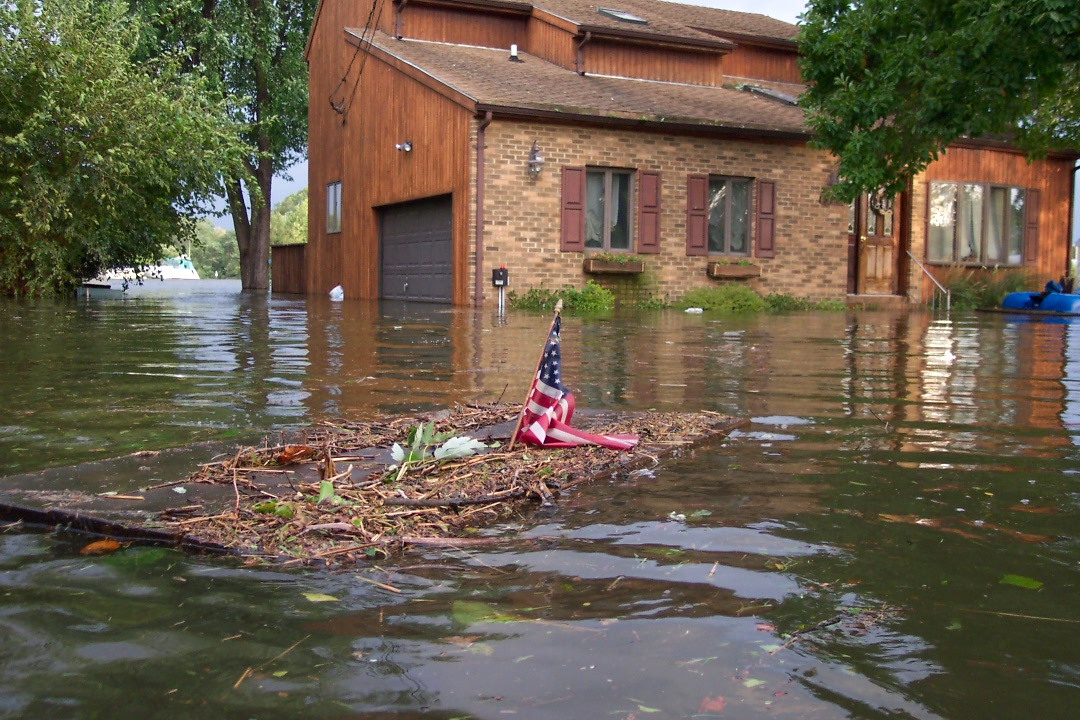
Storm surge flooding caused by Isabel in Bowleys Quarters, Maryland.

Wind gusts in central Maryland peaked at 83 miles per hour (134 km/h) in Silver Spring, with a location along the Patuxent River recording sustained winds of 55 miles per hour (89 km/h). Unofficially, rainfall reached 7 inches (180 mm) in portions of Maryland, though the highest precipitation amount totaled 3.21 inches (82 mm) at the Baltimore-Washington International Airport. Swells from the hurricane produced high storm surges along the Western Shore which peaked at 8.2 feet (2.5 m) in Baltimore. Annapolis also reported a surge of 7.2 feet (2.2 m). In many locations, the storm surge was higher than the previous record set by the 1933 Chesapeake Potomac Hurricane. Throughout central Maryland, 472 buildings and homes were destroyed, with 3,260 greatly damaged and another 3,600 affected in general. Strong storm surge from the hurricane washed 43,000 short tons (39,000 t) of salt, millions of pounds of nitrogen and phosphorus, and millions of gallons of raw sewage into the Chesapeake Bay. One person died as a result of a traffic death in the state. Property damage totaled $530.5 million (equivalent to $906.8 million in 2024), with an additional $190,000 (equivalent to $320,000 in 2024) in crop damage. The crop damage was primarily limited to minor damage to livestock buildings and sheds, though the winds destroyed a hay barn and a dairy barn at one farm in Frederick County. The United States Department of Agriculture estimated the winds of the hurricane destroyed 15–30% of the field corn and 10–15% of the soybean crop. Excess amounts of water led to the closure of many crab processing plants and crab house restaurants, and officials restricted harvest on shellfish for eleven days due to unsafe impurities in the water.

Most coastal areas under 10 feet (3.0 m) above sea level experienced severe wave damage. The Maryland Geological Survey estimates the waves removed 20 acres (8.1 ha) of sand along the coastline, based on an estimate of losses in Baltimore County. The 20 acres (81,000 m^{2}) of lost in single day represent about 15% of the total beach loss in an average year. The average location lost about 5 feet (1.5 m) of beach, and throughout the Chesapeake Bay the erosion deposited about 81,000 short tons (73,000 t) of sediment into the bay. However, the erosion was irregular; some locations were unaffected, while others experienced greater losses, despite that the two locations were similar. The erosion and storm surge damaged many bulkheads, and after the storm surge retreated into the bay it washed away freestanding structures. The passage of Isabel resulted in an unusual increase in phytoplankton in the middle portion of the Chesapeake Bay, followed by an abrupt return to normal conditions by early October.

==== Effects by county ====
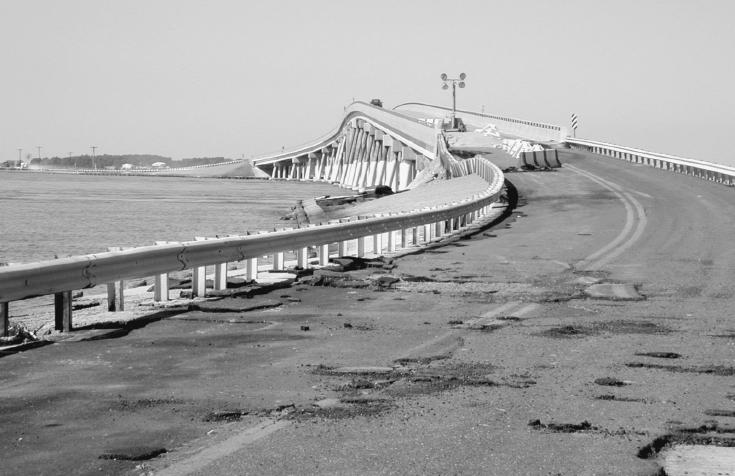
Damage to the ferry bridge in Hoopersvile, Maryland

Six-foot (1.8 m) waves along the coastline of Saint Mary's County, with Point Lookout State Park suffering $3 million in damages (equivalent to $5.1 million in 2024). In the county, 2,500 wharves and piers were destroyed, with another 1,000 moderately damaged, resulting in $10.25 million in monetary damage (equivalent to $17.52 million in 2024). The storm surge destroyed the bridge to Saint George Island by a few hours after the hurricane made landfall, and the flooding covered much of the island for a week. There, 20 homes were destroyed. Shore revetments experienced $53.4 million in damage (equivalent to $91.3 million in 2024). Throughout Saint Mary's County, residential damage amounted to about $17 million (equivalent to $29.1 million in 2024) with about $1.5 million (equivalent to $2.56 million in 2024) to commercial buildings. The damage was caused primarily by the storm surge, though the winds produced minor to moderate damage, the worst effects in the state from winds. In the county, the winds blew off the roof of a home and downed 70 trees, leaving 27,092 without power.

In Charles County, the hurricane resulted in about $2 million (equivalent to $3.4 million in 2024) in damage to roads. Two homes were destroyed with several others damaged on Cobb Island. Elsewhere in the county, Chigger City, Port Tobacco, Woodland Point, Swan Point, and Morgantown also reported damage from Hurricane Isabel, with 52 houses damaged and eight homes destroyed or severely damaged. Seven businesses were also destroyed or greatly damaged. Many piers along the shore were damaged or lost, and two private community wells were contaminated. The winds downed several trees and power lines, leaving about 32,000 people without power. Residential damage totaled $1.1 million (equivalent to $1.9 million in 2024), with another $600,000 (equivalent to $1,026,000 in 2024) to commercial buildings.

Four-to-five-foot (1.2 to 1.5 m) waves hit the eastern portion of Calvert County, causing a home to be knocked off its foundation in North Beach. The storm surge destroyed the pier and greatly damaged buildings along the shoreline at Solomons Island. Power was lost to 22,400 residents as a result of the passage of the hurricane.

The storm surge produced higher than usual tides in along the Patuxent, Potomac, and Anacostia River coastlines. Much of the shoreline of Prince George's County possessed adequate rise of terrain to prevent significant flooding. However, the high waters closed three roads where the shoreline was not high enough. The passage of the hurricane created about 5,000 short tons (4,500 t) of debris to be removed. Fifteen buildings sustained major damage, with another 53 buildings affected to some degree. Nearly 200,000 residents in the county lost power. When two of the largest sewage treatment plants in the state lost power, 96 million US gallons (360,000 m^{3}) of hazardous sewage overflowed to mix with storm water into two waterways in the county. The wastewater combined with rainwater, making it less threatening. No humans or animals were known to have become sick due to the overflows.

In Annapolis in Anne Arundel County, the storm surge surrounded many of the buildings at the United States Naval Academy, resulting in about $116 million in damage (equivalent to $198.3 million in 2024) The Annapolis Maritime Museum suffered severe damage as well, though volunteers moved artifacts to a safer location. There, the storm surge flooded the building in 6 feet (1.8 m) of water, causing great damage to the floor, drywall, and electricity. About 93% of the 211,000 power customers in the county were left without electricity after the storm. FEMA estimated a damage total of up to $500 million (equivalent to $854.6 million in 2024) in the county.

Moderate wave action produced severe beach erosion along the shore of Baltimore County at a loss of $3 million (equivalent to $5.1 million in 2024). Residential areas of Millers Island, Edgemere, North Point, Bowleys Quarters and Turners Station suffered severe damage from the hurricane, with over 400 people needing to be rescued. Over 300 buildings were destroyed. The storm surge flooding killed a man in Dundalk, destroying or greatly damaging most marinas. Strong winds downed 118 trees on school grounds and hundreds of others elsewhere, some of which fell on power lines, leaving 220,000 customers without power. The passage of Hurricane Isabel left 3,189 short tons (2,893 t) of debris across the county.

The storm surge flooded Fells Point and the Inner Harbor of Baltimore, causing millions of dollars of damage to waterfront properties. As the Inner Harbor began to flood, boat owners helped evacuate 35 people in flooded homes. Winds from Isabel destroyed at least three buildings in the city. The Baltimore Museum of Industry alone suffered $1.5 million in damage (equivalent to $2.6 million in 2024). 70,000 were left without power in the city.

In Harford County, high waves and the storm surge caused moderate flooding in areas, forcing 55 to evacuate along the Bush River and 12 to evacuate along the waterfront to Havre de Grace. The promenade boardwalk in Havre de Grace was destroyed. Moderate winds left 51,600 residents in the county without power. Damage in the county totaled at least $12.5 million (equivalent to $21.4 million in 2024).

=== Western Maryland ===
The center of Tropical Storm Isabel passed over Garrett County on September 19, with its unusually large and powerful wind field producing 50 to 60 miles per hour (80 to 97 km/h) wind gusts across western Maryland. Some rainbands produced up to 70 mph (110 km/h) gusts, and in some areas isolated streaks of damage were described as being caused by tornadoes. Rainfall varied between 2 and 4 inches (51 and 102 mm) across the area, resulting in the Potomac River overflowing its banks. At Point of Rocks, the river crested at 23.12 feet (7.05 m), 7.12 feet (2.17 m) above flood stage. Moderate flooding occurred there, and minor flooding occurred in Paw Paw, West Virginia where the river crested at 2.91 feet (0.89 m). The flooding closed a portion of the Chesapeake and Ohio Canal.

The gusty winds from the passage of the hurricane resulted in widespread and extensive tree damage. Due to previous rainfall, moist grounds easily allowed for trees to be uprooted. However, wind damage to structures was minor, with one house in Carroll County being damaged when a tree fell on it, and another house had its sheet metal roof torn off by the winds. Trees fell onto cars, roads, homes, and power lines, leaving 358,000 without power after the storm. 600 traffic signals were without power in Montgomery County, and about 70 roads were closed due to fallen trees. Isabel destroyed 94 buildings and damaged 87, including 33 homes, six of which were severely impacted, with one losing a portion of its roof. Fallen trees injured two in Frederick County. In western Maryland, damage totaled $2.07 million (equivalent to $3.5 million in 2024).

=== Washington, D.C. ===
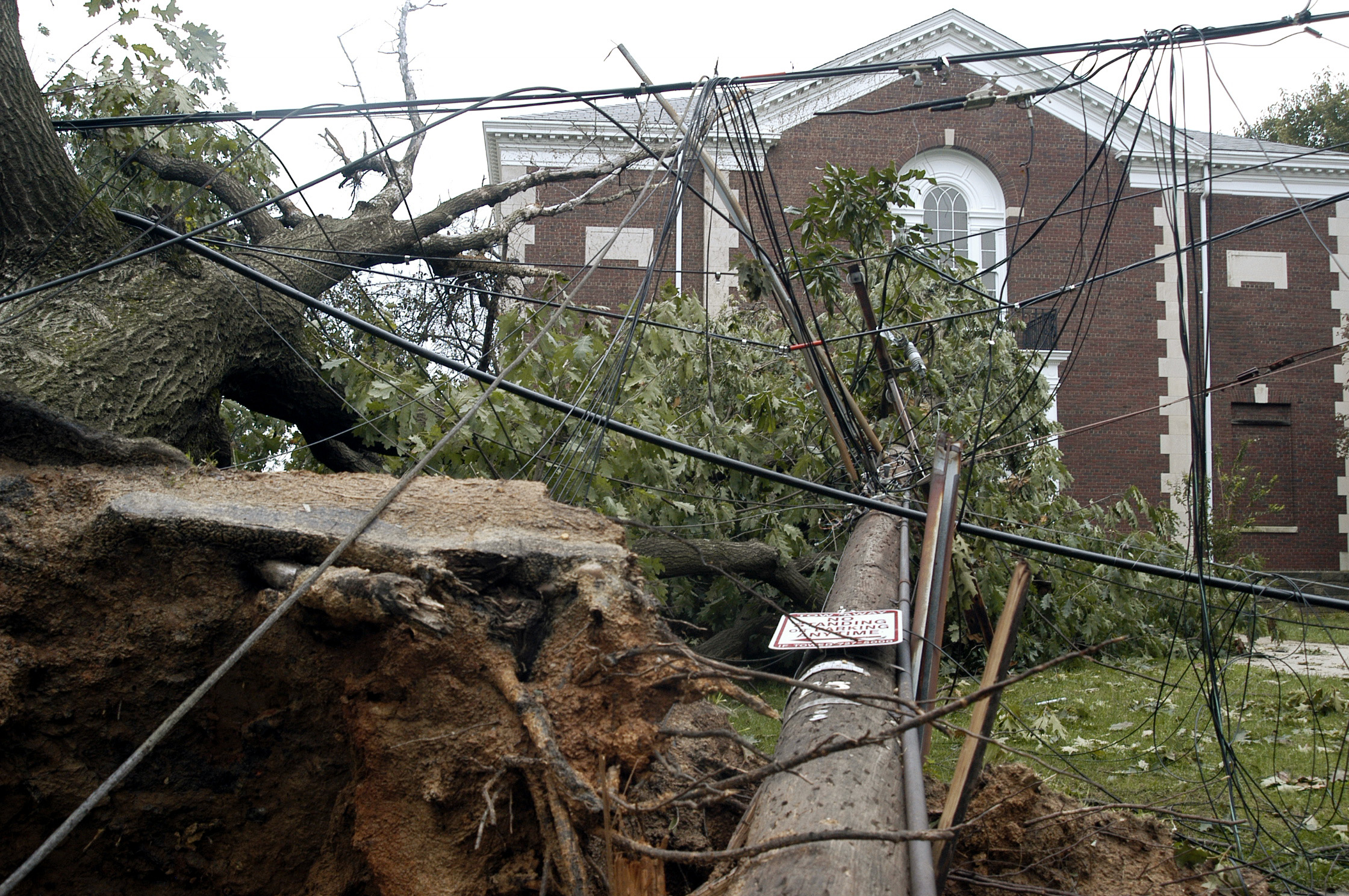
Tree and power line damage in Washington, D.C.

In Washington, D.C., sustained winds remained below tropical storm force, though gusts reached 71 miles per hour (114 km/h) as recorded by the National Academy of Science. Hurricane-force winds existed several hundred feet in the air, with wind sensors on the top of tall buildings recording winds of 70 to 85 miles per hour (113 to 137 km/h). Rainfall was minimal, amounting to around two inches across the district. A gauge on Wisconsin Avenue recorded a storm surge of 11.3 feet (3.4 m), and a gauge on a pier in the southwest portion of the district recorded a storm surge of 10.25 feet (3.12 m). Both observations were records, surpassing the previous observation set by the 1933 Chesapeake Potomac Hurricane.

Moderate winds blew down about 1,600 trees in the district, 23 of which fell onto houses. The United States National Arboretum lost many mature trees and azaleas on the bank of the Anacostia River. The winds also downed many power lines, leaving 129,000 customers without power. Many streets were blocked by the fallen trees and power lines. At the White House, the winds downed one tree in the front garden, though there was no damage to the building itself. The storm surge resulted in flooding at the Washington Navy Yard. There, the marina was damaged, and some buildings and cars in low area garages were flooded. Five people were rescued from cars in flood waters during the storm, and several roads were closed due to the flooding. Throughout the district, the passage of Isabel created approximately 30,000 pounds (14,000 kg) of debris. Damage in Washington, D.C., totaled $125 million (equivalent to $213.7 million in 2024).

== Aftermath ==
Power crews restored 75% of the power outages in the Eastern Shore of Maryland by two days after the hurricane struck, and by one week after the hurricane the power was restored completely to the Eastern Shore. Buildings in Washington, D.C., remained closed for two days after the hurricane. After the hurricane, several people in central and western Maryland were injured with three killed from carbon monoxide due to improperly running generators in their houses. Additionally, others were injured due to chain saws and cleaning up debris. In the days after the hurricane, the Calvert County Hospital reported an extra 130 patients per day.

The hurricane's strong winds and storm surge dislodged and damaged many home heating oil tanks, releasing thousands of gallons of oil onto yards and into the environment. The Maryland Department of the Environment and the United States Environmental Protection Agency worked together to recover more than 50,000 US gallons (190,000 L) of oil from the tanks. Five hundred properties were contaminated by the oil, causing the Federal Emergency Management Agency to provide 75% of the funding for cleaning the properties; the Maryland government provided for the remainder of the cost.

On September 19, 2003, President George W. Bush declared the entire state of Maryland as a disaster area, which allowed residents affected by the hurricane to apply for federal aid. FEMA officials urged residents and business owners with significant damage to call as soon as possible, while those with minimal damage were asked to wait for a few days. All residents in the state who received damage from the storm had sixty days to apply for assistance. Federal and state officials opened disaster recovery centers in Annapolis, Baltimore, Essex, and Prince Frederick five days after the hurricane passed through the area, with the centers designed to provide more information to those who applied for federal assistance. About six days after Isabel made landfall, additional disaster recovery centers opened in Rock Hall in Kent County, California in Saint Mary's County, Silver Spring in Montgomery County, Chester in Queen Anne's County, Crisfield in Somerset County, Cambridge in Dorchester County, and Easton in Talbot County. Around a month after the hurricane, officials placed some residents unable to live in their damaged homes into travel trailers because they had no options for alternate housing, such as staying with a relative or friend.

On September 26, the affected residents began receiving housing assistance grants, totaling $4.3 million in aid. By a month after the hurricane passed through the area, disaster aid amounted to just over $30 million (equivalent to $51.3 million in 2024). Ultimately, aid in the state totalled just under $100 million (equivalent to $170.9 million in 2024). Business owners applied for 14,595 loans and received $53.4 million (equivalent to $91.3 million in 2024) in low interest loans from the Small Business Administration. The state also received more than $16.9 million in funds (equivalent to $28.9 million in 2024) to rebuild infrastructure damaged by Isabel. 17,855 residents applied to receive more than $20.8 million (equivalent to $35.6 million in 2024) in housing assistance, and $8 million (equivalent to $13.7 million in 2024) in assistance for other needs such as personal property, transportation and medical expenses.

President Bush also declared Washington, D.C., as a disaster area two days after Isabel passed through the area. The United States Department of Agriculture approved a request for an emergency food stamp program for two weeks for the city to ensure those who lost food as a result of the hurricane would not go hungry. By eight days after the hurricane, the Department of Employment Services created disaster unemployment benefits for those who lost their work as a direct result of Isabel. By 11 days after Isabel, the government approved $5.21 million in disaster assistance (equivalent to $8.9 million in 2024). The U.S. Army Corps of Engineers delivered nearly 800,000 pounds (360,000 kg) of dry ice to four distribution sites for use with cold food storage to areas in the District suffering from power outages. Various groups joined to provide more than 15,000 meals for residents who lost stored food due to spoilage resulting from the power outages. Volunteers assisted in distributing 515 short tons (467 t) of ice, along with 21,000 sandbags throughout the district. Officials opened two disaster recovery centers which moved through the neighborhoods of the district. Ultimately, nearly 1,500 residents in the district applied for federal assistance, with FEMA providing the residents more than $600,000 in aid (equivalent to $1,026,000 in 2024).

== See also ==
- List of Atlantic hurricanes
- List of Maryland hurricanes (1950–present)
- List of retired Atlantic hurricane names
