= Brook Road Academy =

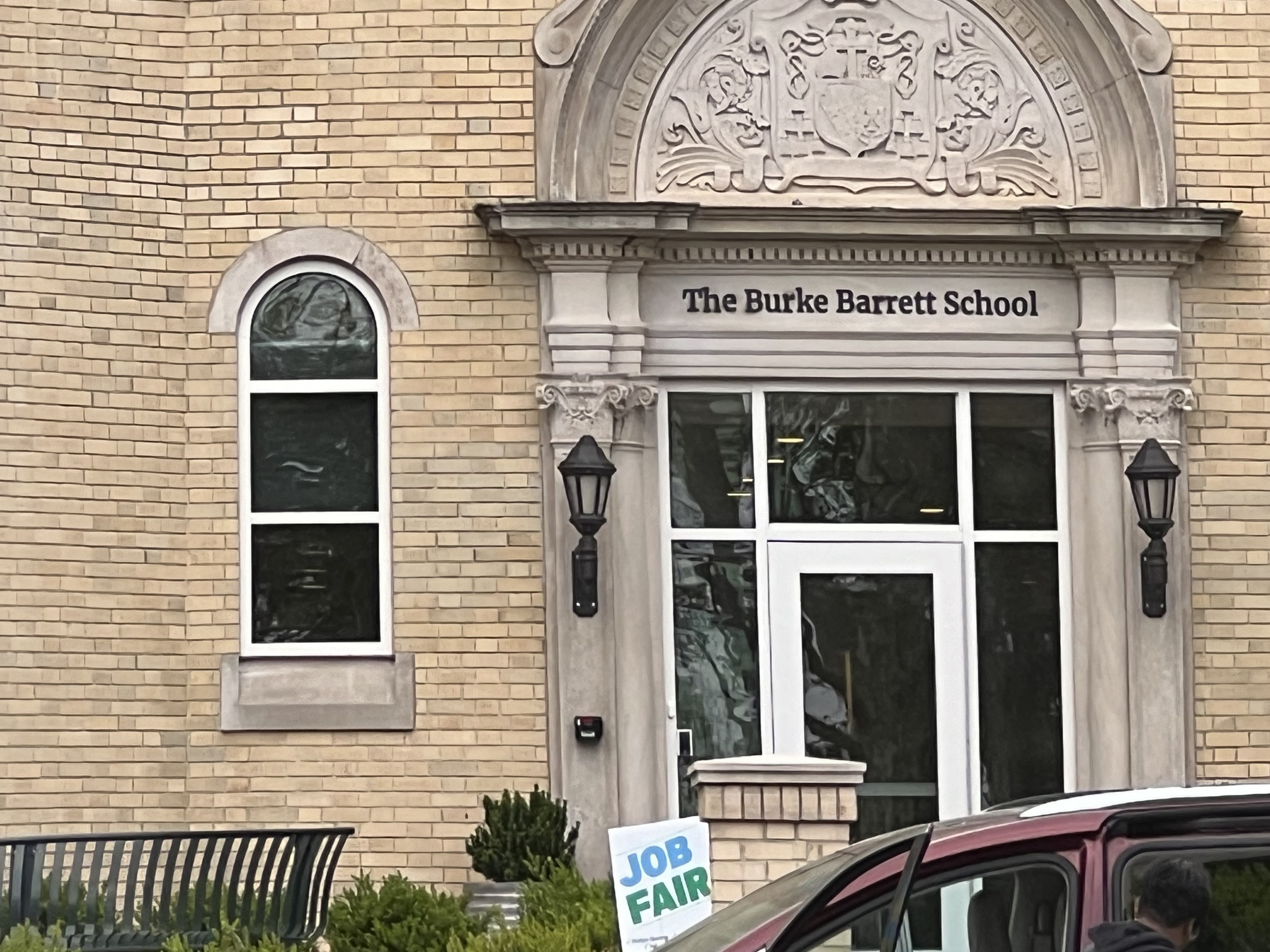
- Location of the former Brook Road Academy.

Location
- Richmond, Virginia; United States
- 37°37′55″N 77°27′43″W

Information
- Type: Alternative
- Established: 2000
- Teaching staff: 6.0 (on an FTE basis)
- Grades: 8-12
- Enrollment: 28 (2017-18)
- Student to teacher ratio: 4.2
- Website: www.brookroadacademy.com

Brook Road Academy was a private school in Richmond, Virginia, United States.

== History ==
It was established in 2000. In 2022 the school closed down.
