= City Point Railroad =

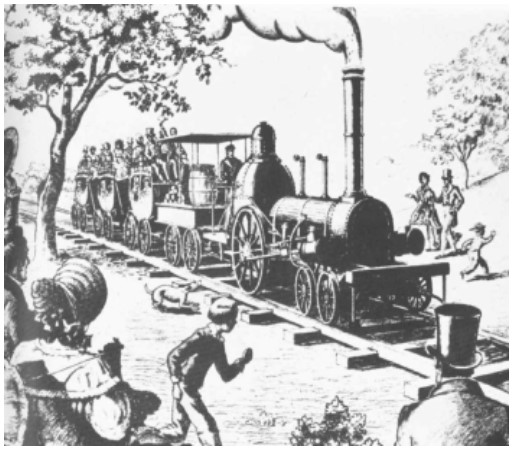
- Sketch of first train leaving City Point in 1838 by Francis Earle Lutz drawn in 1957.

Overview
- Locale: Hopewell, Virginia
- Termini: City Point, Virginia; Petersburg, Virginia (headquarters)

History
- Opened: 1836
- Closed: 1847 (purchased by Southside Railroad in 1854)

Technical
- Line length: 8.6 mi (13.8 km)
- Track gauge: 5 ft (1,524 mm) gauge

In 1836, the Virginia House of Delegates approved a charter for the City Point Railroad. City Point, Virginia, was just ten years old. The Lower Appomattox Company ran boats of cargo from Petersburg, Virginia, to the large port at City Point. The company knew that the port needed a rail road to be competitive in the 1830s even though this would only be the second rail road in Virginia. Large ships that were too large for Port Walthall or Petersburg had to load and unload at City Point. Goods for export arrived in Petersburg from farms and plantations by way of the Upper Appomattox Canal Navigation System. The Richmond and Petersburg Railroad bringing coal and goods to port was also chartered in 1836. Coal arriving by boat from the Clover Hill Pits in 1837 and goods would soon be taken on the Clover Hill Railroad to connect with the Richmond and Petersburg Railroad to export from the area ports.

== History ==
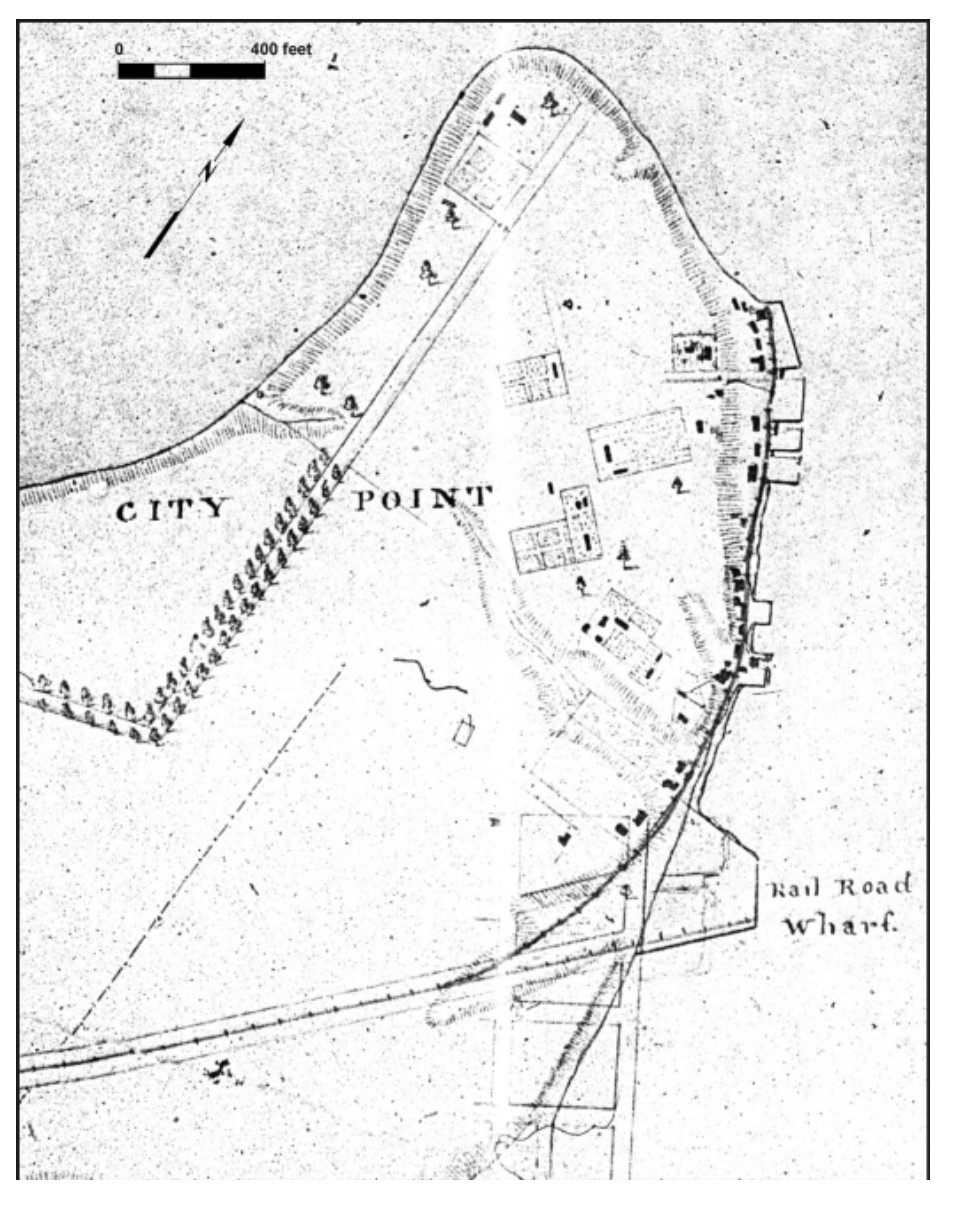
City Point Map by Couty 1837

The City Point Railroad was an eight plus mile railroad in eastern Virginia established in 1836 which ran from City Point (now part of the independent City of Hopewell) on the navigable portion of the James River to Petersburg, Virginia. It was surveyed in 1836 to not need more than around 20 ft of grade every mile and only gentle curves. John Couty, the chief engineer, had previously improved the Upper Appomattox Canal Navigation System in 1830. The debt needed to build the railroad was made greater by the Panic of 1837. The City point Railroad began to operate on September 7, 1838. The railroad started at City Point, where the Appomattox River runs into the James River because the Appomattox River was not as deep and wide as would allow large ships to dock closer to Petersburg.

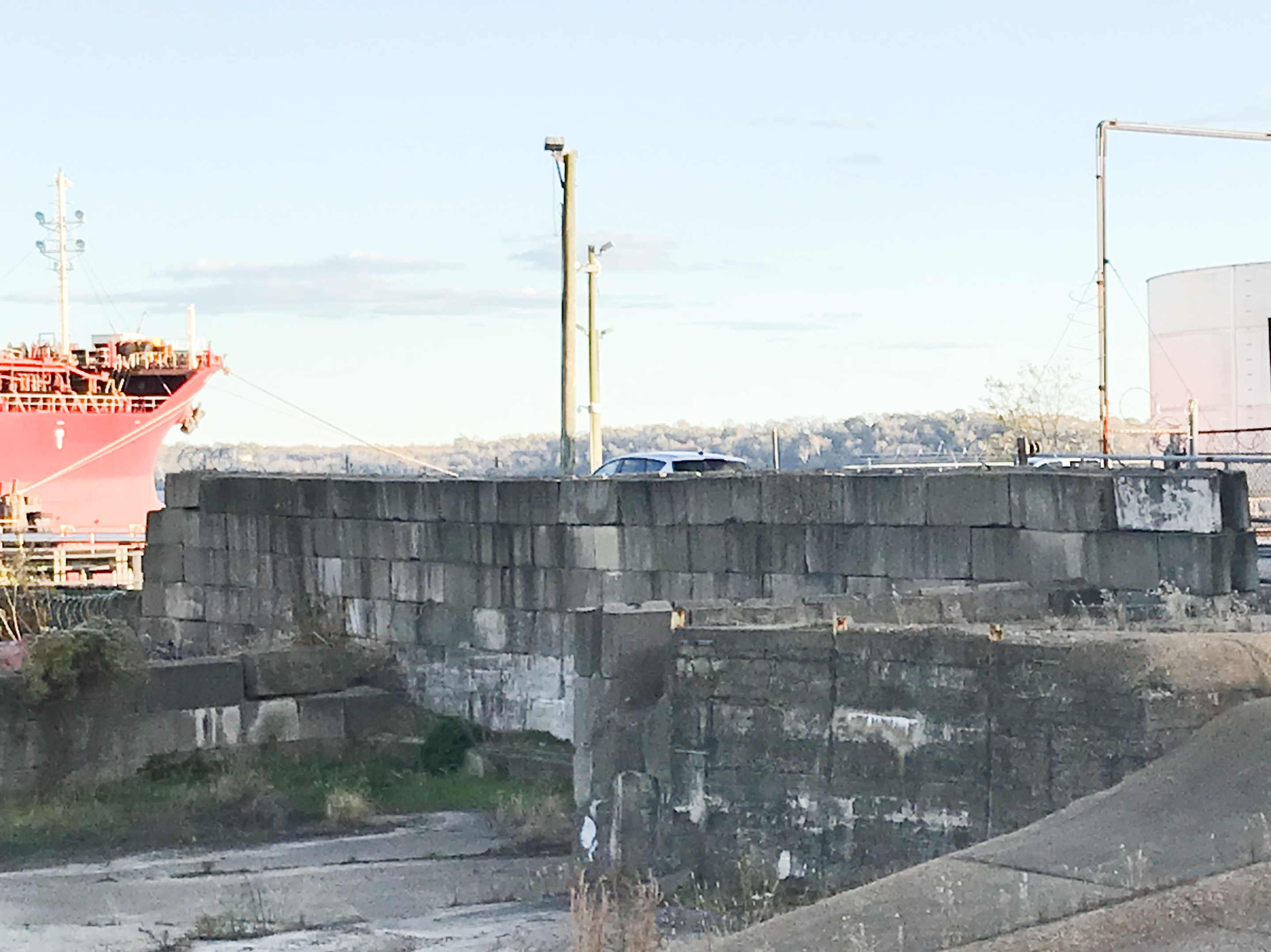
City Point Warf Granite Work.

By 1841, millions of dollars of tobacco were shipped, through City Point and hundreds of thousands of dollars' worth in flour were shipped. Tobacco accounted for almost half of the value of goods shipped. The City Point Railroad Company was also involved in other transportation businesses than rail. The company also operated small boats on the Lower Appomattox from City Point to Petersburg. But even with this horizontal integration the company could not cover the debt from the development of the railroad.

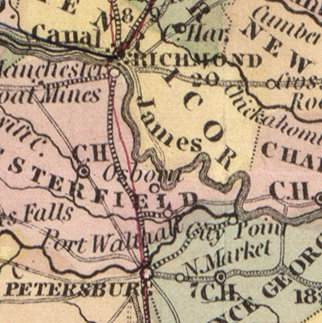
The tourists pocket map of the state of Virginia 1853, exhibiting its internal improvements roads distances. Cropped for City Point Railroad.

City Point railroad was purchased by the city of Petersburg and reorganized as the Appomattox Railroad in 1847. The City of Petersburg was allowed, by the Virginia General Assembly in 1848, to sell up to one hundred thousand dollars of bonds to finance repairing the Appomattox Railroad. In 1849, Albert Stein made the port deep enough for ships with a 7-foot draft. A.G. McIlwaine, who would later found the Life Insurance Company of Virginia, complained that the port needed a 10 or 12 foot draft to hold the 200 ton carrying ships that commonly carrying tobacco and flour. Smaller ships meant higher freight charges and limited ships would service the port meaning less cargo for the renamed Railroad to ship. The line was later purchased by the Southside Railroad in 1854 to connect much further inland.

During the siege of Petersburg the United States Military Railroad rebuilt part of the old line for the City Point & Army Railroad.
