= Richmond and Petersburg Railroad Bridge =

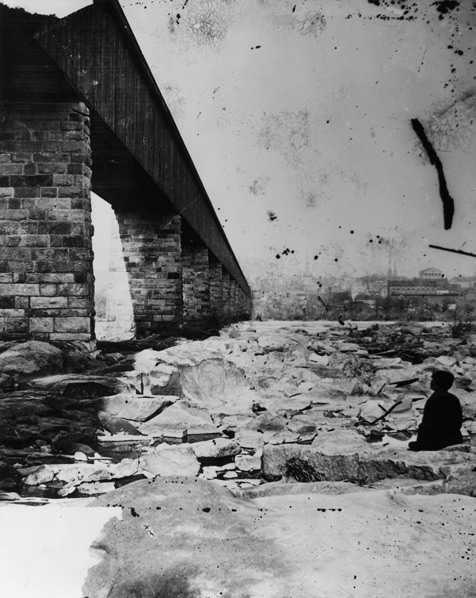
- The bridge circa 1871
- Coordinates: 37°31′55″N 77°26′37″W
- Carries: Richmond and Petersburg Railroad
- Crosses: James River
- Locale: Manchester, Virginia

Characteristics
- Design: Lattice truss bridge
- Total length: 2,844 feet (867 m)
- Width: 17 feet (5.2 m)
- Longest span: 153 feet (47 m)
- Clearance above: 60 feet (18 m)

History
- Designer: Moncure Robinson
- Construction start: 1836
- Opened: 1838
- Closed: March 26, 1882

Location
- Interactive map of Richmond and Petersburg Railroad Bridge

The Richmond and Petersburg Railroad Bridge was a bridge that carried the Richmond and Petersburg Railroad and several later railroads including the Atlantic Coast Line Railroad and the Seaboard Coast Line Railroad over the James River in Richmond, Virginia. It was first built in 1838 and after going through four different bridges was finally torn down in 1970.

The Richmond and Petersburg Railroad Company (R&P) was chartered on March 14, 1836, with available capital of $800,000. The company was unique in that its bridges could also be used for "travel by horseback, carriage, sheep, cattle, and hogs" in addition to the regular use by the train. This condition was not allowed at the James River unless the consent of the owners of Mayo's bridge (the first bridge of the James at Richmond and in 1836 the only) was secured. Work on the railroad began in summer 1836 with Moncure Robinson as chief engineer. In May 1838 the railroad had completed a track running from the south bank of the James River at Manchester to the north bank of the Appomattox at Pocahontas and in September of that year a bridge was completed over the James. Originally, the R&P did not have a bridge over the Appomattox River as they used the Manchester and Petersburg Turnpike Company's bridge to transport freight and passengers across the river. Thus, there was no railroad bridge over the Appomattox until 1867 when the R&P ran a line over the river to connect with the Petersburg Railroad.

The bridge was destroyed by the Confederate States Army on April 2, 1865, in anticipation of the Fall of Richmond. Shortly after the war ended, the federal government and the railroad company rebuilt the bridge over the James River, a 400-foot-long (120 m), 12-foot-high (3.7 m) trestle bridge. It opened on May 26, 1866, and was built at a cost of $118,245.

The bridge was burned again in 1882 when sparks from a locomotive caused a fire on the bridge. It was rebuilt the following year. In 1898, the R&P merged with the Petersburg Railroad, which ran south from Petersburg, Virginia, to Garysburg, North Carolina (near the rail hub of Weldon), to form the Atlantic Coast Line of Virginia and in 1900 this company was merged into the Atlantic Coast Line Railroad, creating a non stop railroad from Augusta, Georgia to Richmond. Beyond Richmond, the ACL used the tracks of the Richmond, Fredericksburg, and Potomac Railroad and other numerous railroads to extend their line to the Potomac River and subsequently Washington, DC and all points north.

Two years after the founding of the ACL, in 1902, the bridge was rebuilt for the fourth time. For some reason, the new railroad company decided to forsake the old, tall granite piers in favor of new, shorter concrete piers. This may have been because of the age of the granite piers or perhaps the concrete was thought to be stronger. An interesting historical note about these newer stone piers is that some have fallen over in the years since the bridge was taken down in 1970 while all of the original 1838 brick piers still stand tall. Throughout the first 15 years of the 20th century, the ACL continued to use the old R&P RR bridge at Richmond to transport passengers. Freight was transported on a connection line that split off from the RF&P line west of Richmond and went south to join the R&P line south of Manchester. This line predated the incorporation of the ACL and was operated jointly by both the RF&P and R&P. In 1916, this belt line was made into a double track to accommodate increased freight and passenger traffic (which was now too voluminous to go down the original connector railroad on Byrd St in the middle of Richmond). The line was serviced by the Broad Street Station which became a massive center of rail transportation in Richmond. The old connector railroad was torn up and the old R&P rail lines in and near Richmond were discontinued although the ACL maintained its headquarters at Byrd St Station, the original Richmond station of the R&P.

In 1967, the Atlantic Coast Line Railroad Company merged with its longtime rival, the Seaboard Air Line Railroad Company, to create a new railroad termed the Seaboard Coast Line Railroad. This was brought upon by a decrease in passenger travel as the car became much more economical than a train. In 1970, the Richmond and Petersburg Railroad bridge was removed as it no longer served any purpose along with the original 2 miles (3.2 km) of the R&P as they had been superseded by other adjacent lines owned by the same company.

Today, the concrete and granite piers of the bridge can still be seen just upstream of the Manchester Bridge. Its south side, also called the Manchester Wall, has been used for rock climbing since the 1980s. The former railroad bed, once on the outskirts of Manchester, has been greatly encroached on by development. Yet, from an aerial map, the former route can be vaguely traced out; from the ground, very little can be seen of the second steam railroad to service Richmond as it has been overgrown by shrubs, trees, and other plant life.
