= Clover Hill Railroad =

Railroad company in Virginia, United States

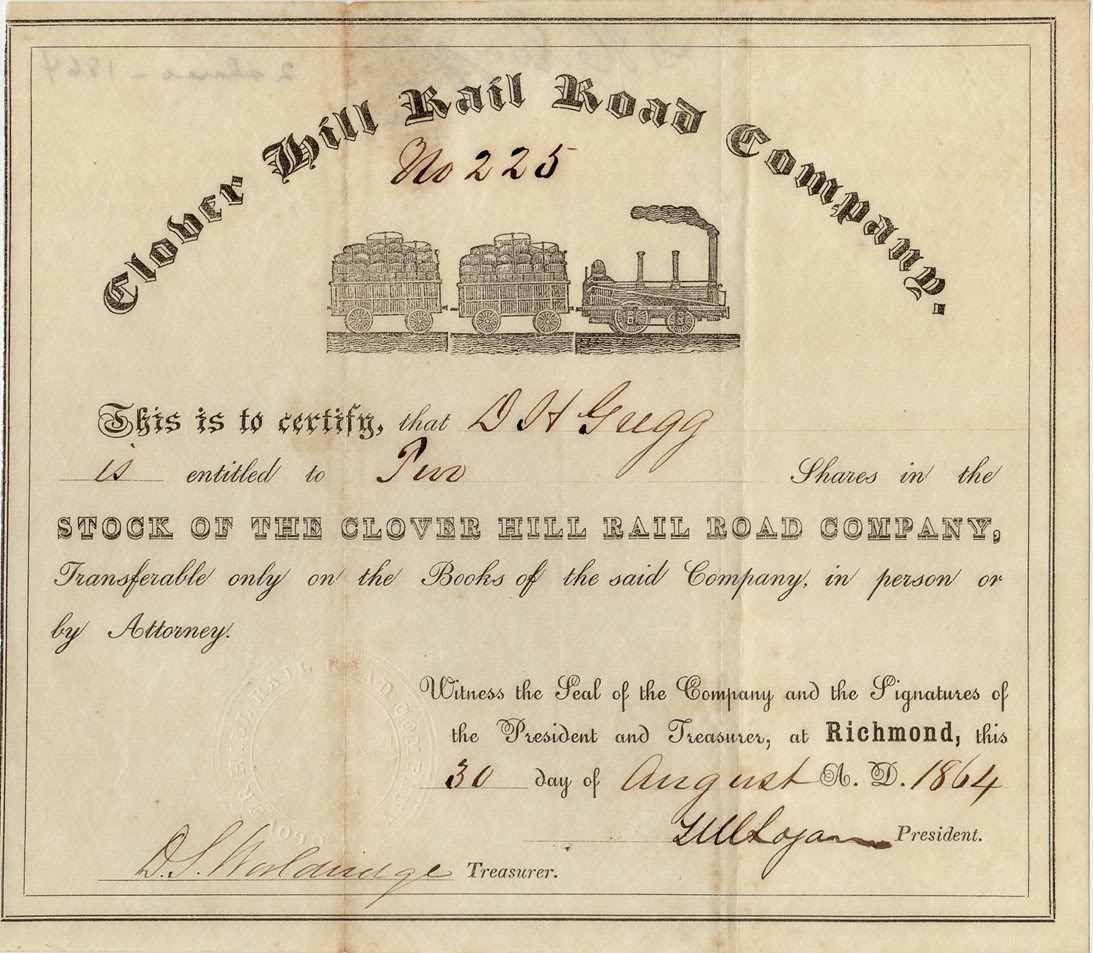

Overview
- Headquarters: Richmond, Virginia
- Locale: Chesterfield, Virginia
- Dates of operation: 1841–1877
- Successor: Brighthope Railway

Technical
- Track gauge: 4 ft 8 1/2 in (1,435 mm) standard gauge

The Clover Hill Railroad was a railroad company that operated for 36 years in central Virginia near Richmond. The railroad was created to carry coal most efficiently from the Clover Hill Pits in Winterpock, Virginia, to further transportation points in Chester, Virginia, where it could be sold for a better price than on the Appomattox River in the Piedmont region. This made the railroad important to the Confederacy in the Civil War to ensure a supply of coal for munitions and iron working. The mines were dangerous for the miners, and many accidents occurred. The railroad had to be sold when coal mining declined so that new owners could find other uses for the railroad.

== History ==
=== Founding of the Railroad ===
The Clover Hill Railroad Company was chartered in 1841 by the Virginia General Assembly to do business with the Richmond and Petersburg Railroad but was not allowed to charge more than 2 cents per bushel of coal shipped over the railroad. In 1845 the Clover Hill Railroad replaced the mules that brought coal from the Clover Hill Pitts to the Appomattox at Eppington to be shipped on the Upper Appomattox Canal Navigation System to Petersburg. In 1847, October 1, the Clover Mining Company built 18 miles (29 km) of railroad from the coal mines at Winterpock to the town of Chester to make a spur of the Richmond and Petersburg Railroad. By 1848 the railroad spur had hauled 56,880 tons of coal for export and 21,227 tons for use in Richmond and Petersburg.

The Clover Hill struggled with increases charged on prices for transporting coal to Richmond, Petersburg and Port Walthall by the Richmond and Petersburg Railroad in 1854. The Clover Hill also found it necessary to ask the Richmond and Petersburg Railroad to fulfill their agreements and maintain the Clover Hill Railroad tracks. In 1866 the Clover Hill Mining Company built a wharf at Osborne's Landing in order to load the coal on to ships to the coast. The line was extended to Osborne's Landing in 1867.

=== American Civil War and the Clover Hill Railroad ===
During the Civil War, the Confederate States needed coal because they could not get it from Pennsylvania. They turned to mines in Midlothian and Clover Hill, Virginia. DS Woolridge, a Confederate government coal agent in Richmond, wrote in 1862 that he had received, by way of the Clover Hill Railroad, over 1320 bushels of coal for delivery to Manassas, Virginia. The Clover Hill Coal Mines were one of the main suppliers of coal to the Tredegar Iron Works for Confederate arms. Coke, a very pure coal-based fuel, was also made at Winterpock from 1865 to 1870 for use in Tredegar. Clover Hill, in turn, bought bars and spikes from the Tredegar Iron Works.

The U.S. Federal Government ran the Clover Hill Railroad in the last year of the Civil War to meet coal shortages in Richmond and Petersburg.

=== Bankruptcy ===
The demand for coal from the mine declined after the Civil War. The railroad lost money, and in 1877 the Railroad and Mines were sold to the Brighthope Mining Company. In 1881, the line was reconstituted by investors as the Brighthope Railway.

== Presidents ==
- Charles Ellis (1868 or before – )
- T. M. Logan (1869 – )

== Stations ==
The first tracks were laid from the Clover Hill Pitts to 4 miles (6 km) south at Epps Falls on the Appomattox. The Clover Hill Railroad was granted a charter in 1841, and in 1846 tracks were built 18 miles (29 km) from the Clover Hill coal mines at Winterpock to the town of Chester. The Railroad had the Swift Creek Rail Bridge.

The line was extended to Osborne's Landing in 1867.

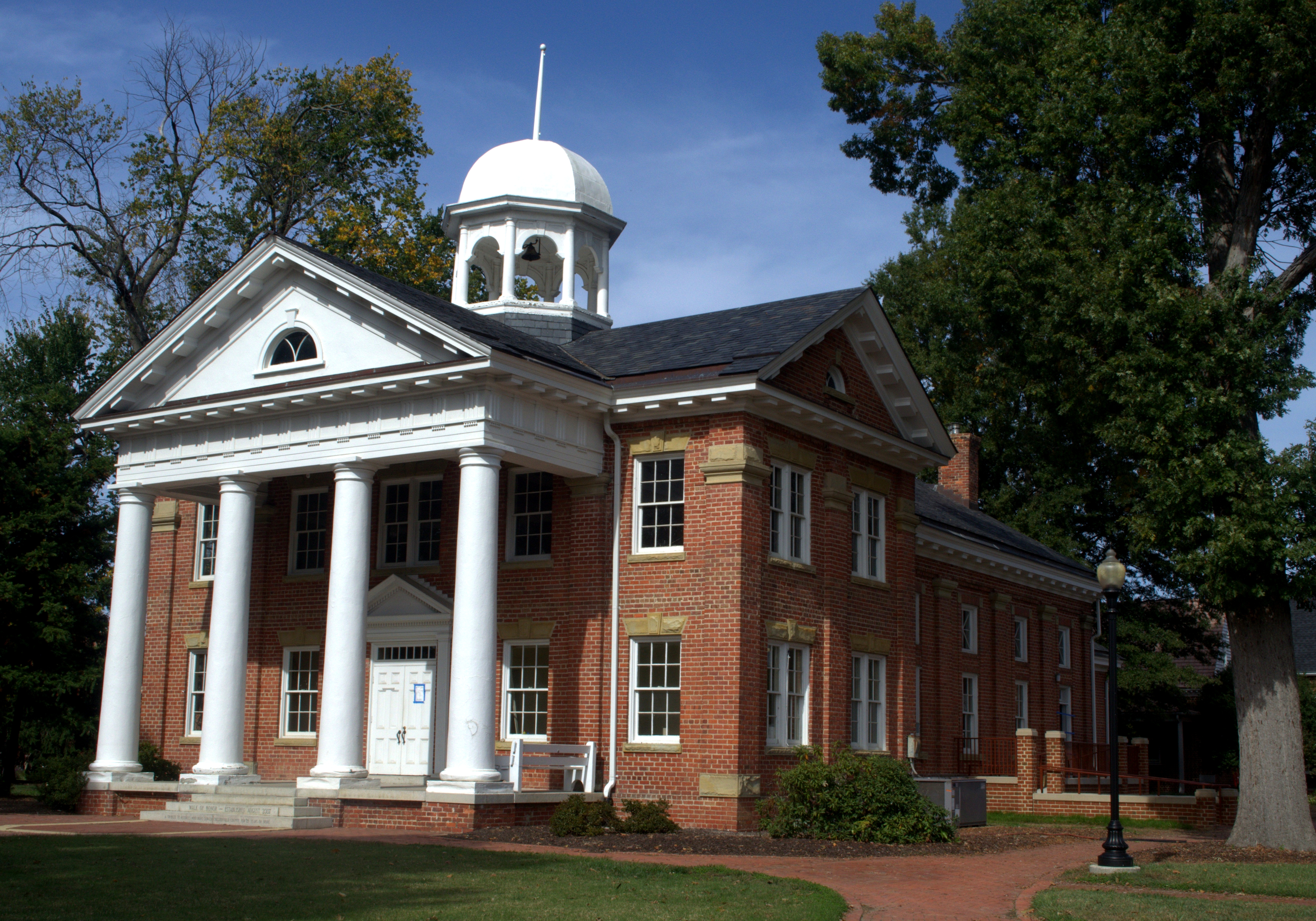
Chesterfield Historic Courthouse

=== Main line ===
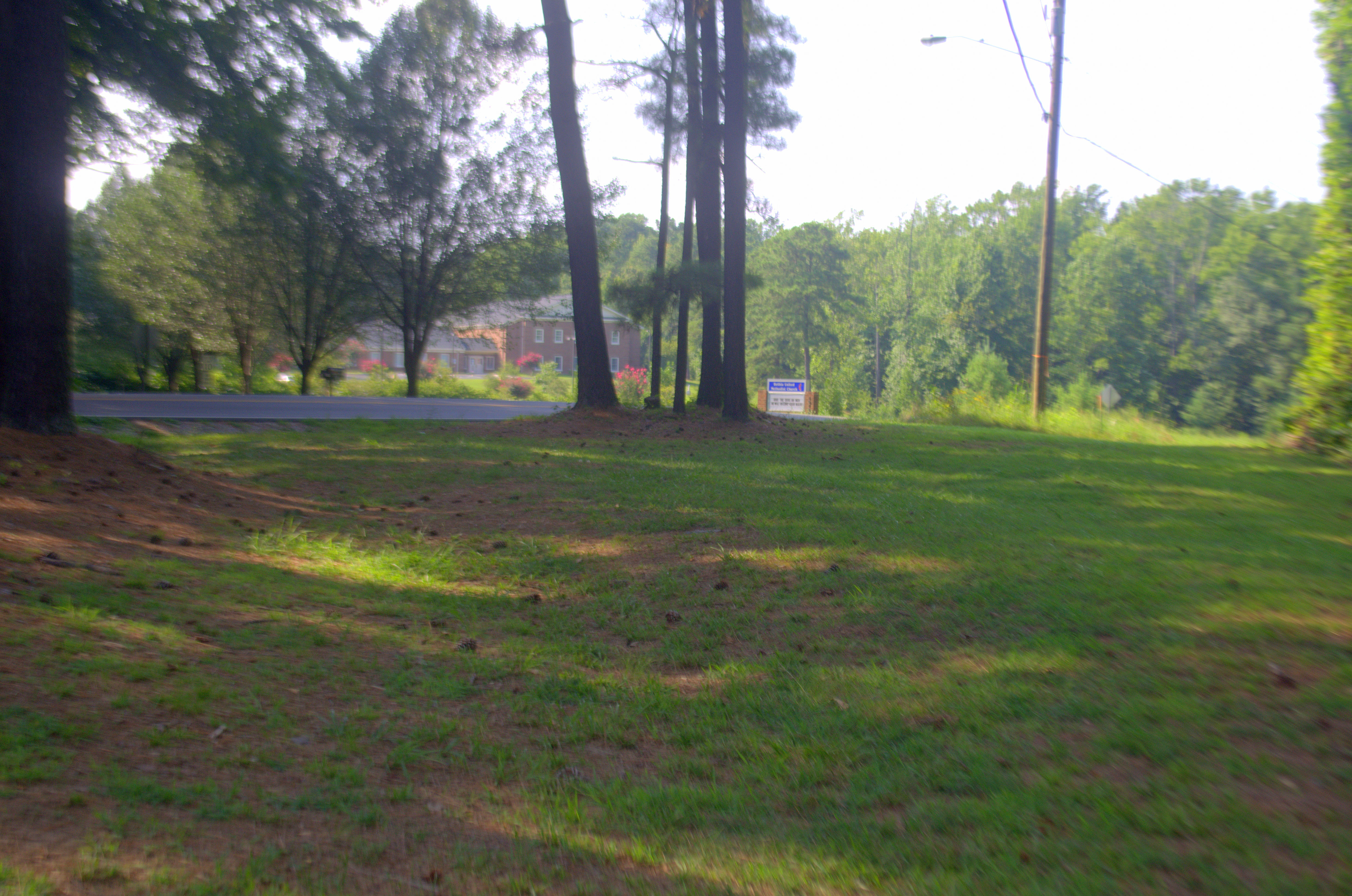
The bed of the Clover Hill Railroad near Clover Hill

  - Osborne's Landing (from Chester after 1867)
  - Junction with Richmond and Petersburg Railroad in Chester (start before 1867)
  - Chesterfield Court House (5 miles from junction)
  - Clover Hill (14 miles from junction)

=== Spur South from Clover Hill ===
  - Epps Falls (4 miles from Clover Hill)

== Location ==
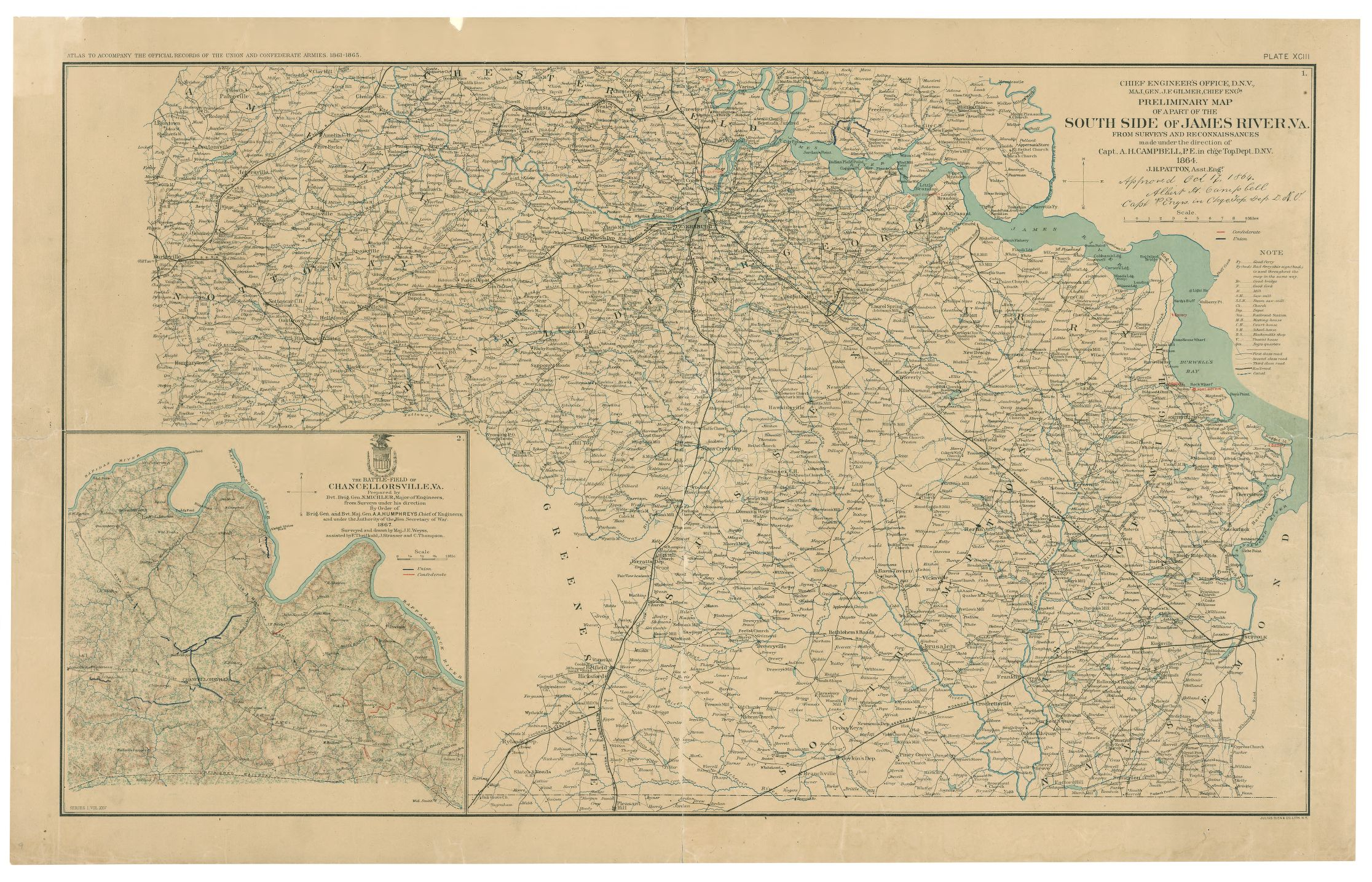
The Clover Hill shown in southern Chesterfield, Virginia, on a map drawn by the Confederate Army for 1861.
