= Brighthope Railway =

American railway

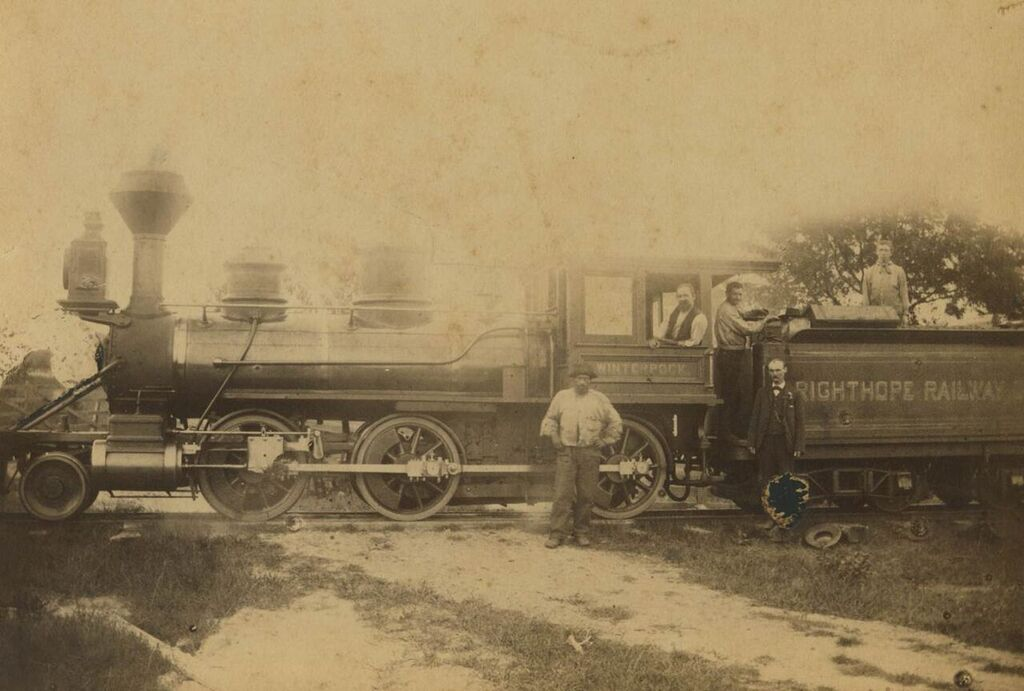
- The Brighthope Railway Engine

Overview
- Headquarters: Richmond, Virginia
- Locale: Chesterfield, Virginia
- Dates of operation: 1877–1889
- Successor: Farmville and Powhatan Railroad

Technical
- Previous gauge: Standard until 1881, then was narrowed to narrow gauge, 3 ft (914 mm).

In 1886, Randolph Harrison, of the Virginia Department of Agriculture, cited Cumberland Mining Company, stating that the United States had purchased stock in the Brighthope Railway. He continued by citing their assertion that extending the railway into Cumberland would increase the value of farms there because they could sell consumer agricultural products such as fruit, dairy and vegetables to all markets of Virginia. The Brighthope Railway was founded in 1877 by the creditors of the Clover Hill Railroad who bought that railroad when the Clover Hill Railroad went bankrupt. The Brighthope Railway continued in the role of the Clover Hill Railroad, hauling coal from the Clover Hill Pits at Winterpock, Virginia. In addition to coal, the Bright Hope Railway transported timber and agricultural products and had passenger service. The Bright Hope Railway was narrowed from standard gauge to narrow gauge and rerouted in 1881. In 1886, much of the southern rails were changed to standard gauge. The Brighthope Railway was not changed back.

In 1889 the Bright Hope Railway was sold in foreclosure for $200,000 to the Farmville and Powhatan Railroad, which became the main line of the Tidewater and Western Railroad. The line survived until 1917 when it was pulled up and sent to France for the World War I effort.

== Stations ==
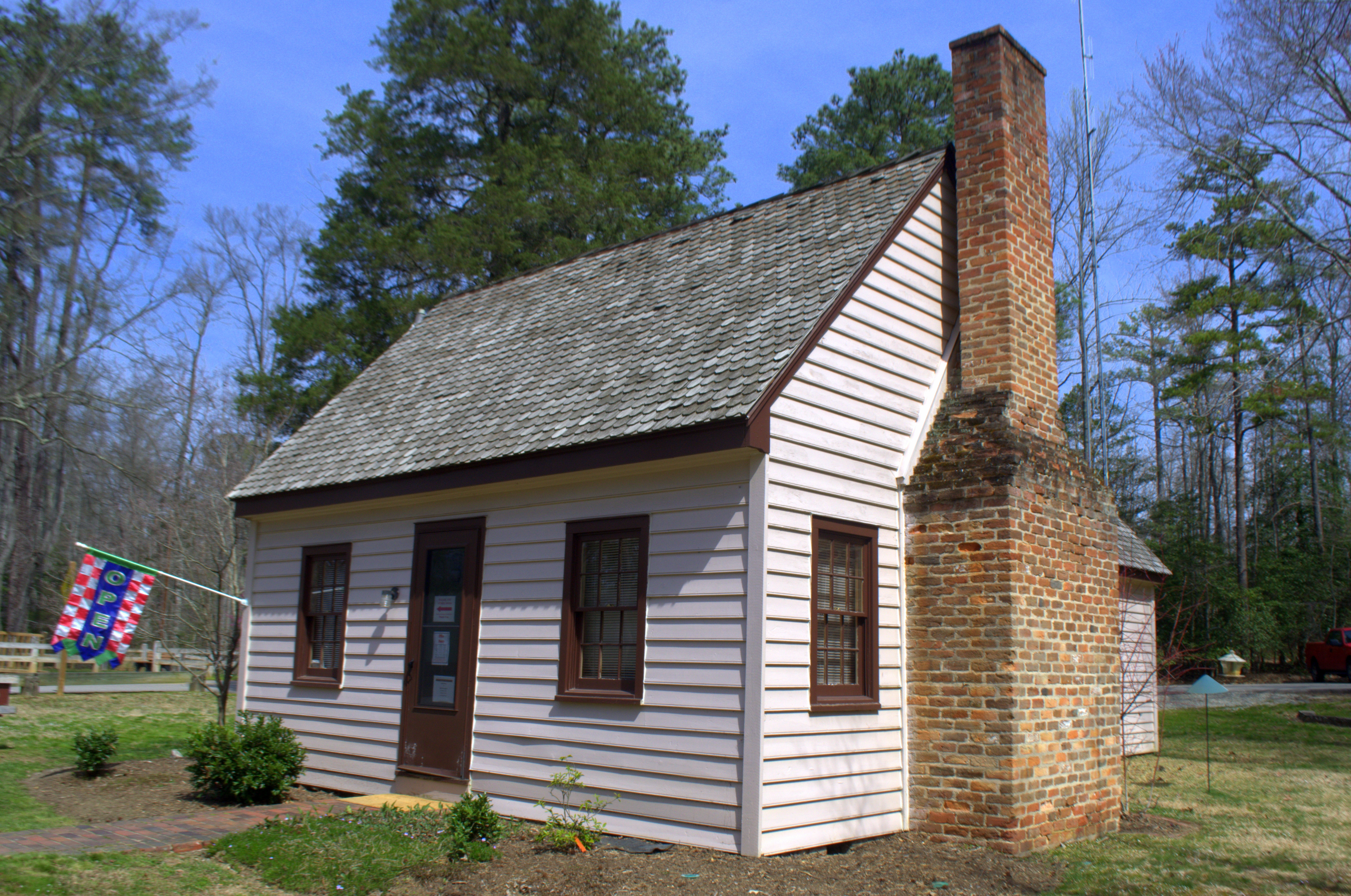
Fendley Station remodeled into a Park Office

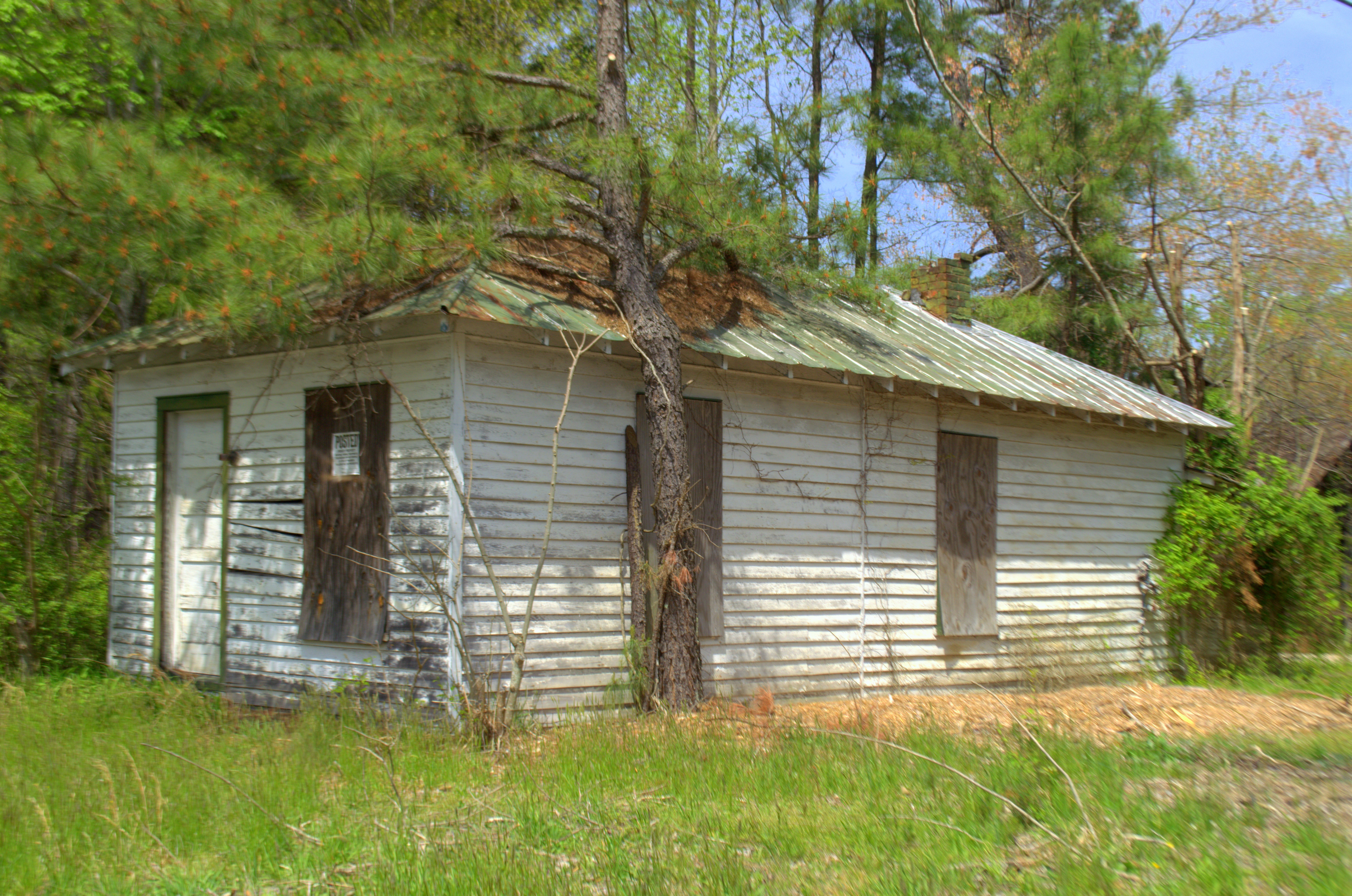
The Purdue Station on the Brighthope Railway shown here in 2016 at 12702 Beach Road in Chesterfield, Virginia

The Brighthope Railway was a standard gauge railway to Osborne Landing when it was created. In 1881, sand and silt from the Dutch Gap Canal made the Osborne Landing dock unreachable by boat. The Railway was narrowed to narrow gauge and routed to Bermuda Hundred, the newer docks could harbor coastal colliers. It was lengthened four miles at the western end to reach the Appomattox at Epps Falls in the Piedmont. The Railway has a bridge over the Richmond and Petersburg Railroad and the Swift Creek Rail Bridge.

- Before 1881: railroad length: 21 miles
  - Winterpock, the small coal mining town, where the Bright Hope Mines coal mines were located.
  - Summit
  - Perdue
  - Fendley was a water station for the train located on present day Beach Rd (37°22′18.5″N 77°33′34″W). This station was moved to become the office for Pocahontas State Park.
  - Chester was a small town at the intersection with the Richmond and Petersburg Railroad in the 1870s.
  - Osborne's, docks on the James River in the Tidewater region site of Action at Osborne's in 1781.
- After 1881: railroad length: 32 miles
  - Appomattox River, in the Piedmont, the westernmost stop.
  - Winterpock
  - Summit
  - Perdue
  - Fendley Station
  - Chester
  - Bermuda Hundred on the James River in Tidewater, where coal could be transported by coastal colliers.

=== Brighthope rail cars ===
In 1883, the Brighthope Railway had four steam locomotives, two passenger cars and 144 freight cars. Railroad engineers included Edwin B., Cheatham; fireman Jerry Mack and conductor Luther Puckett.

== Modern pathway ==
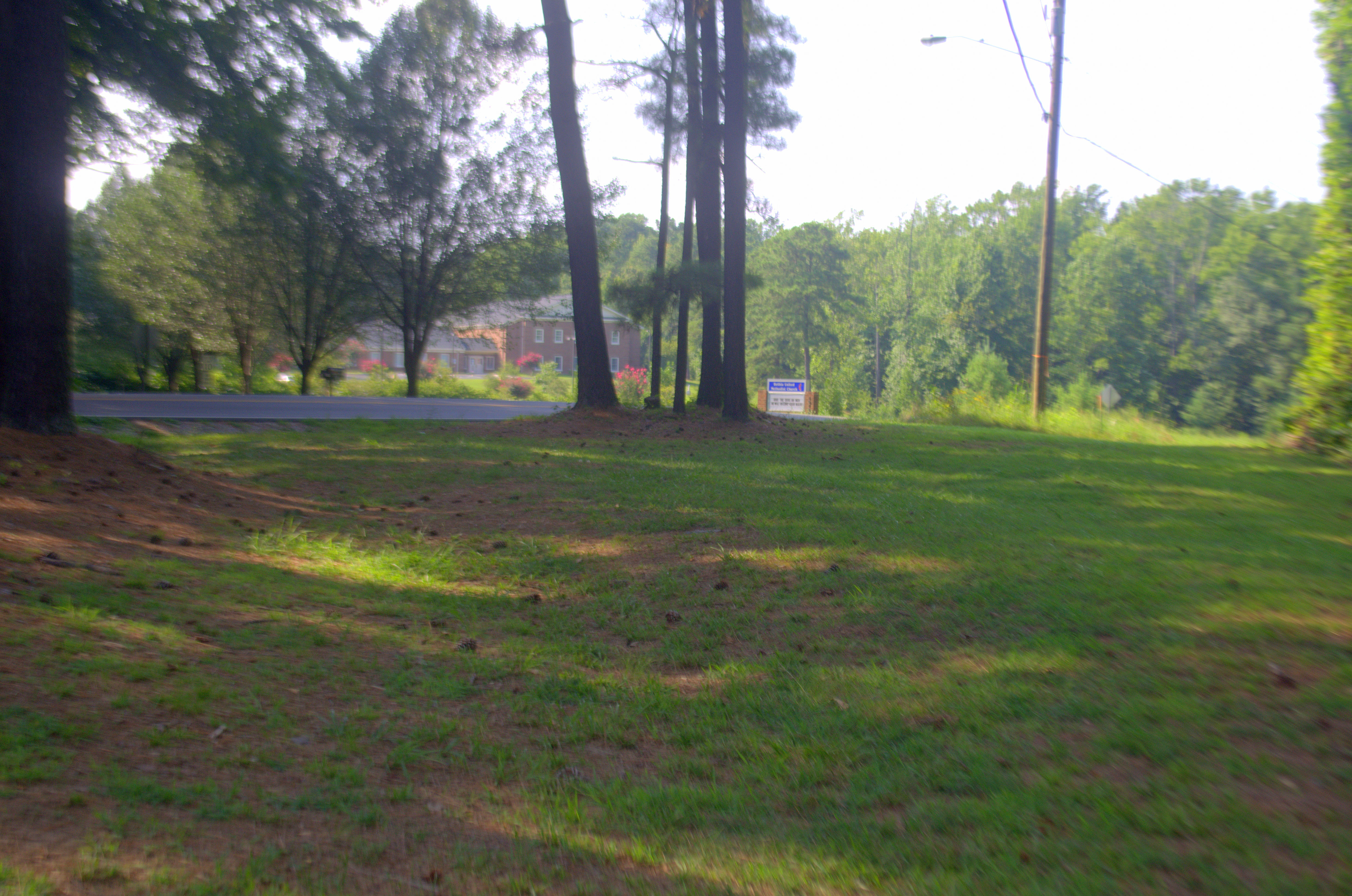
This is the Railroad Bed of the Brighthope Railway at Winterpock, Virginia.

Following the path of the old railroad today travels down Virginia State Route 10 from Bermuda Hundred on the north side of the Appomattox River and then east on Carver Heights Drive, Chester, through a landfill and housing complex, next to Bright Hope Road then along Beach Road then South on Coalboro Rd.

== Location ==
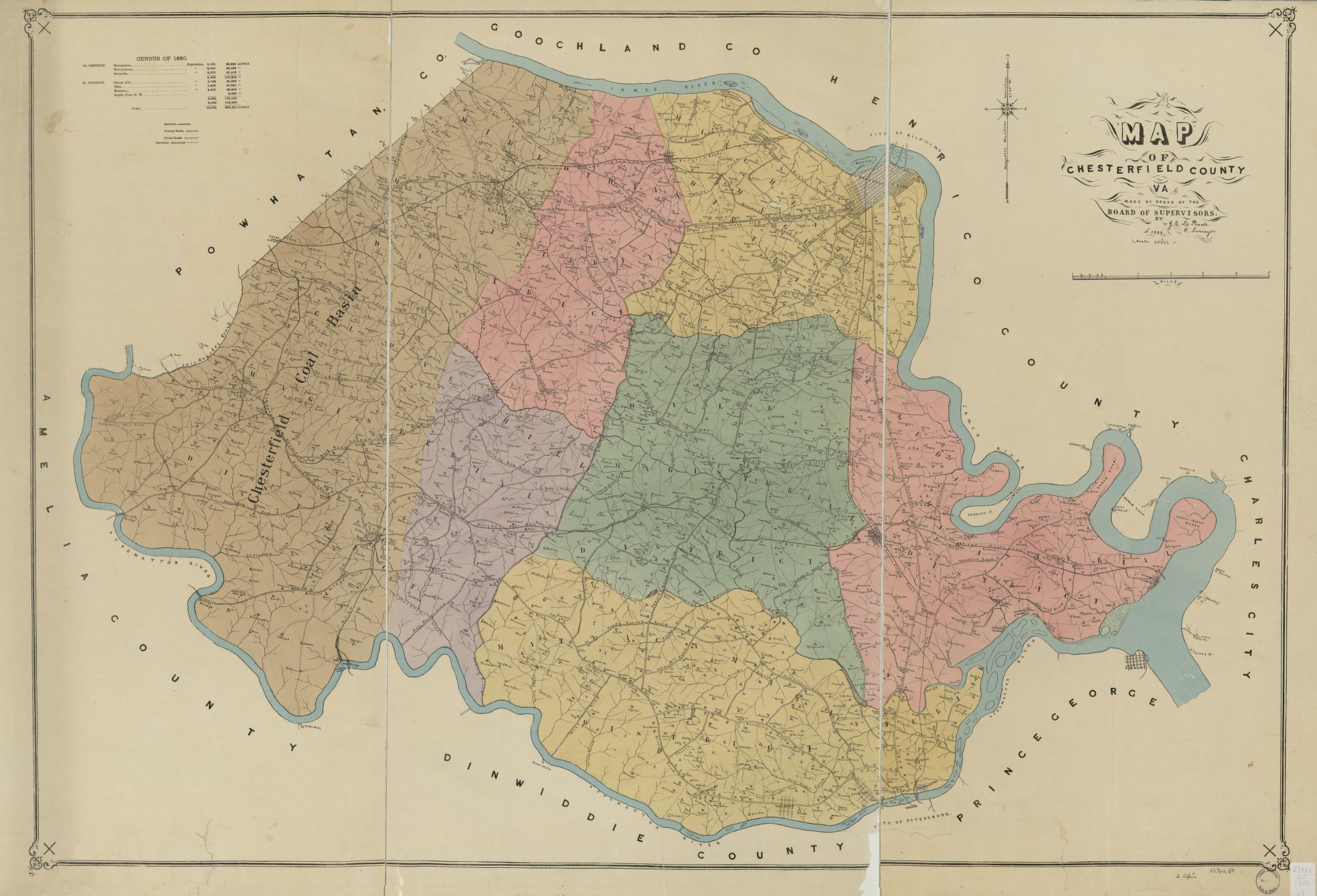
The Brighthope Railway shown in southern Chesterfield, Virginia on a map drawn by La Prade in 1888.
