= Richmond and Petersburg Railroad =

1838–1898 Virginia railroad

- Main Line (red) and Belt Line (dark red). Click to enlarge.

Overview
- Headquarters: Richmond, Virginia
- Locale: Virginia
- Dates of operation: 1838–1898
- Successor: Atlantic Coast Line Railroad

Technical
- Track gauge: 4 ft 8 1/2 in (1,435 mm) standard gauge
- Length: 22 miles (35 km)

The Richmond and Petersburg Railroad moved passengers and goods between Richmond and Petersburg from 1838 to 1898. It survived the American Civil War and eventually merged into the Atlantic Coast Line Railroad in 1900.

== History ==
The Richmond and Petersburg was founded in 1836 and sold in 1898. It survived a war and several financial panics. It went from a railroad that only connected trains from Richmond to Petersburg, to a part of an entire east coast system. It went from a slave economy to having fully paid employees.

=== Founding ===
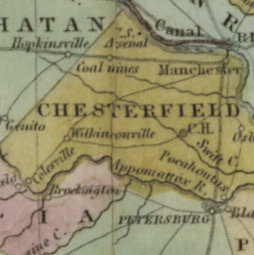
The Proposed Richmond and Petersburg Railroad with the Chesterfield Railroad bringing coal in from Western Chesterfield. The "coal mines" post office was established in November 1811 with a name change to "Black Heath" post office in 1851 after coal was discovered in other parts of the county to the south.

The Virginia General Assembly granted a charter of a railroad between Richmond and Petersburg in 1836 which connected other railroad lines to make profits transporting cotton and coal to market. Moncure Robinson, the engineer who designed the Reading Railroad owned by the Reading Company, designed the Richmond and Petersburg Railroad. The rail line was completed to Manchester, Virginia's industry on the south bank of the James River across from Richmond, Virginia. The steam engines would pass right under the terminus of the mule and gravity powered Chesterfield Railroad, which brought coal from Midlothian, Virginia to Manchester. The Richmond and Petersburg Railroad Bridge across the river, connecting to Richmond, would be built after the rail line was completed. The Panic of 1837 lead to a reduction in the purchase of subscriptions to ship on the rails so it was difficult to pay for construction. The Virginia Board of Public Works advanced money for their subscription and England loaned money to keep the Richmond and Petersburg Railroad company solvent. The labor for the railroad was provided by slaves, but slave holders collected fees from leasing arrangements, and the railroad company provided clothes for the slaves. The Rail line was completed in 1838.

A branch line was created to Port Walthall which connected to Norfolk, Washington, Baltimore and Philadelphia by Steamboat in 1845. In 1846 passengers began to travel this way and freight could be shipped as well. The rail line also carried mail under contract with the U.S. Postal Service

=== Transporting coal ===
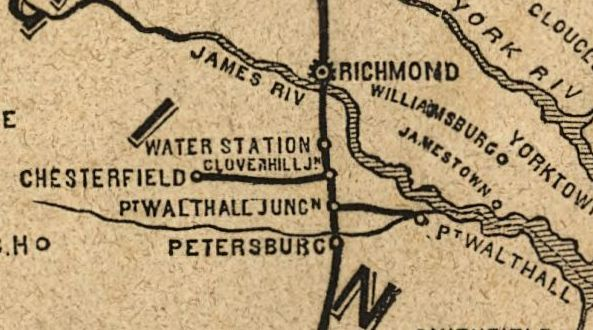
In 1848, the Chesterfield Railroad is no longer shown and the Clover hill is shown connecting to coal mines, the Clover Hill Pits.

The Clover Hill Railroad Company was chartered in 1841 by the Virginia General Assembly to do business with the Richmond and Petersburg Railroad but was not allowed to charge more than 2 cents per bushel of coal shipped over the railroad. The Clover Hill Railroad brought coal from the newly discovered Clover Hill Pits beginning in 1848. This coal was taken to Richmond and Petersburg Railroad and shipped north from Port Walthall. Although the Clover Hill made a large profit at first, the Chesterfield Railroad could not move coal from Midlothian to Manchester as efficiently as the steam powered Richmond and Danville Railroad, which reached Midlothian in 1850. The Chesterfield Railroad was sold when the Virginia General Assembly gave the Chesterfield Railroad permission to sell off its assets in the same year. The Richmond and Petersburg Railroad lost money as well. In 1948, the Virginia General Assembly allowed the Richmond and Petersburg to cut by half the total shares of stock and give each creditor one half as many shares, paying the same dividends per share because of losses and debts incurred by the railroad company.

=== Fares ===
Fares for the entire line in 1853 were $1.10 for White adults and 60 cents for African Americans, and children paid the same as African Americans. Fares for stopping at Port Walthall Junction, the Half Way stop, and Temple or Falling Creek fares were 35, 60 or 85 cents for White adults and 35 or 60 for African Americans.

=== 1857 legal precedent set by Richmond and Petersburg Railroad ===
In the same year as the Panic of 1857, the Richmond and Petersburg Railroad faced a lawsuit, The Richmond and Petersburg Railroad v. Martha J. Jones, over hitting several cows in a railroad accident. The plaintiff had left her cows outside of her fence and they wandered onto the track. The railroad was found to be following their lawful practices. The railroad was found not to be liable and a precedent was set that a railway company has the same rights and protection, when doing lawful business as a person doing lawful business. To collect damages, the plaintiff must show a lack of skill or caution.

=== Civil War and Reconstruction ===
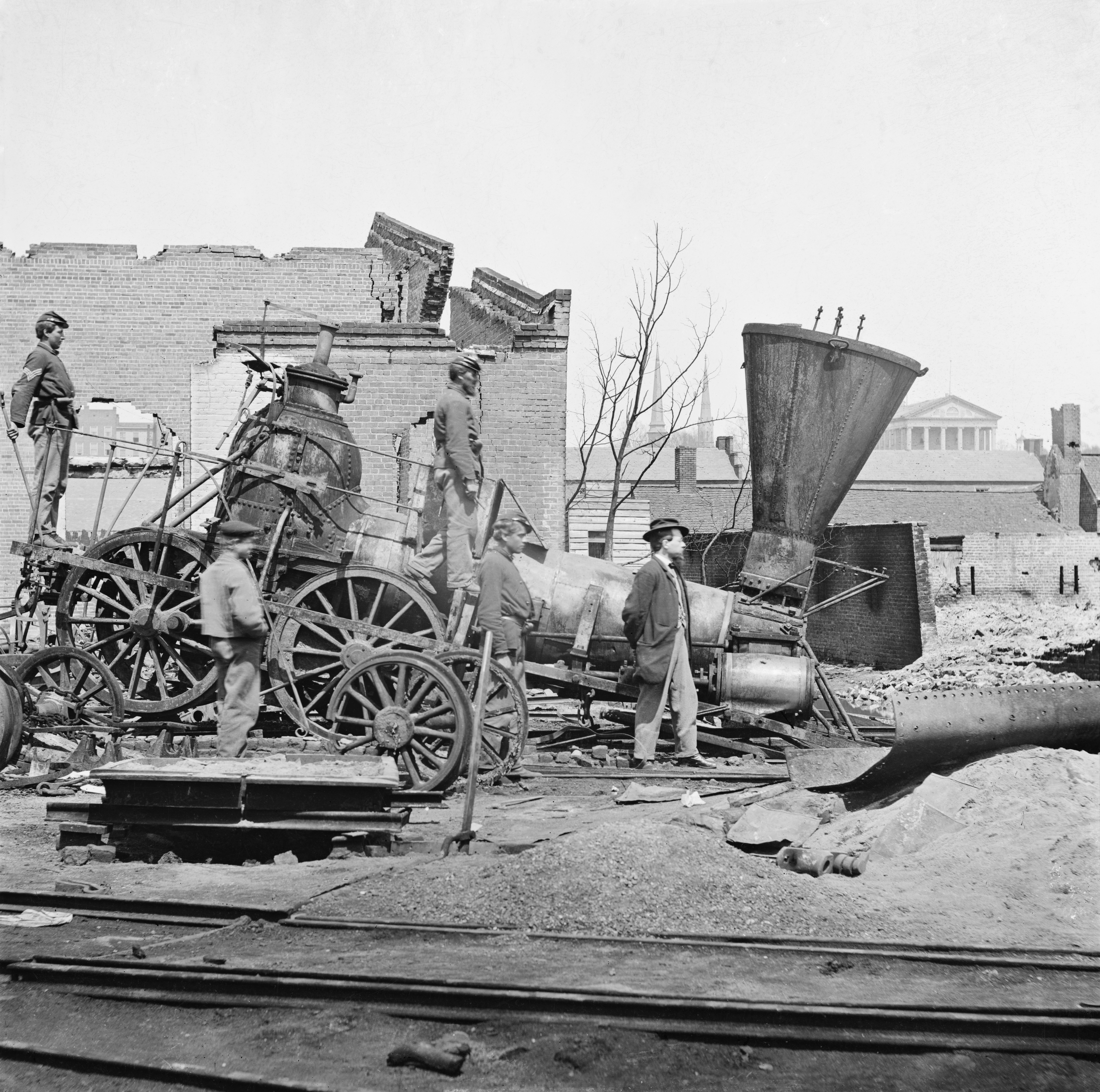
Richmond & Petersburg locomotive destroyed in the fall of Richmond, April 1865

Railroads in the Southern United States were funded to boost local economies. The Richmond and Petersburg Railroad owned an Omnibus and coaches to take passengers from one line to another. Goods and passengers had inefficient connections when travelling through cities and passengers would have to stay at hotels. Robert E. Lee, of the Confederate States of America predicted that the south's non-connecting railroads would cause problems for the military. He was proven correct when two locomotives had to be hauled over land around Alexandria during the American Civil War.

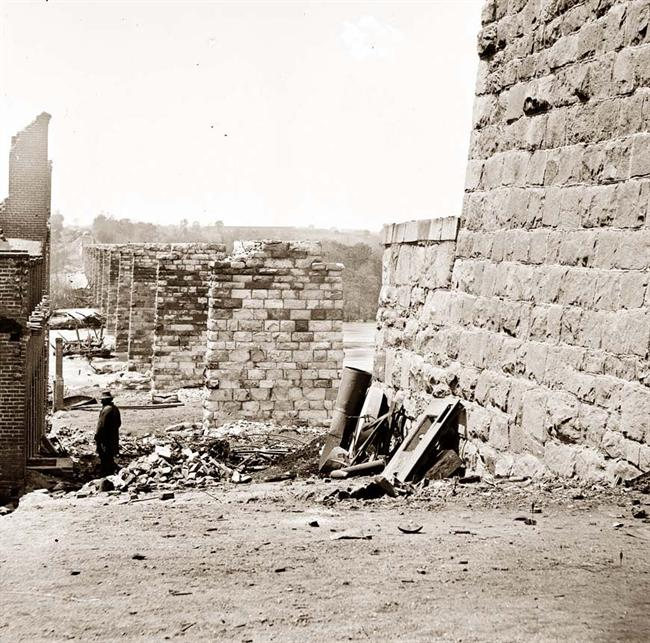
Richmond and Petersburg Railroad Bridge after it was destroyed by Confederate Troops.

Towards the end of the war, Lt. Gen. Ulysses S. Grant tried to cut off the Richmond and Petersburg Railroad, which was the supply line to Richmond, in the Siege of Petersburg. The Confederacy eventually destroyed the bridge across James River as they retreated. The U.S. Federal Government rebuilt the bridge over the James River, a 400-foot-long (120 m), 12-foot-high (3.7 m) trestle bridge on the Richmond and Petersburg Railroad in the last year of the Civil War.

After the War, railroads were held by owners outside of the southern cities during the Reconstruction Era. These non-residents were happy to have rail lines that passed through cities efficiently. Union stations were built to connect different rail lines. A company, owned by both railroads, was founded in 1867 to connect the Richmond and Petersburg with the Richmond, Fredericksburg and Potomac. Investments in the railroad also paid for the rebuilding of the Richmond and Petersburg Railroad Bridge over the James River.

The train took about an hour end to end in 1884, with a fast route with no stops that took 45 minutes. Three passenger runs and a mail run went in each direction with connections to the Brighthope Railway, the Petersburg Railroad, the Norfolk and Western Railroad and the Richmond, Fredericksburg and Potomac Railroad.

The Richmond and Petersburg Railroad had been built to 4 ft 8 1/2 in (1,435 mm) gauge whereas railroads south of Wilmington were built in 5 ft (1,524 mm) gauge. While this was not an issue as long as the lines were not physically connected, the gauge difference prevented through traffic from the late 1860s onwards. Railroad Officers of the South met in Atlanta in February 1886 to determine a day to standardize gauges on all railroads to enable trains to travel all over the south without loading or unloading or having passengers change trains. In May the gauge was quickly changed to 4 ft 8 1/2 in (1,435 mm). The Brighthope Railway, a privately held spur which had switched to a narrow gauge of 3 ft (914 mm), was not changed.

Railroads used wood to power the steam engines before the civil war. During the Civil War, the Richmond and Petersburg wood choppers, who were slaves, provided fuel for the steam engines. After 1870, as the eastern forests were cleared, coal gradually became more important. The Richmond and Petersburg hired firemen that shovel coal in 1893 and did not list any wood purchased in their account of fuel.

=== Belt Line ===
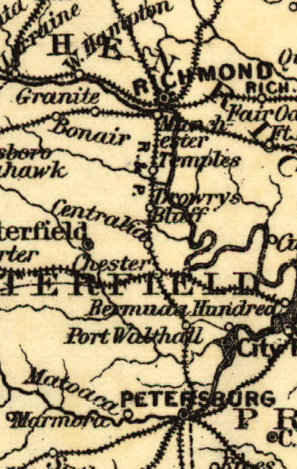
Map from 1891 showing the stops on the Stops on the Richmond and Petersburg.

By the late 1880s, passenger and freight traffic was heavy enough that it was causing significant congestion in downtown Richmond as much of the track connecting to the Richmond, Fredericksburg and Potomac Railroad ran down the middle of Belvedere and Broad Streets. To combat this, an additional line bypassing downtown Richmond was built jointly by the Richmond and Petersburg Railroad and the Richmond, Fredericksburg and Potomac Railroad. This line, known as the Belt Line, connected with the Richmond and Petersburg main line at Coffer Road near Clopton and ran northwest, crossed the James River, and headed north along the west side of Richmond to a junction with the RF&P main line (which would be known as AY Interlocking). The Belt Line opened in 1891 and had a single track and was used as a freight bypass while passenger trains continued to use the original route.

=== Merger into the Atlantic Coast Line and later years ===
Already in 1882, passengers could travel seamlessly in sleeper cars from Boston, Massachusetts to Washington, D.C. or from New York, New York to Jacksonville, Florida along the Atlantic Coast. William T. Walters of Baltimore, Maryland formed a holding company, in 1889, later called the Atlantic Coast Line of five consecutive railroads starting with the Richmond and Petersburg Railroad and connecting all the way to Charleston, South Carolina. In 1898, the Richmond and Petersburg Railroad merged with the Petersburg Railroad to form the Atlantic Coast Line of Virginia. In 1900, all five railroads were merged to form the Atlantic Coast Line Railroad from Richmond all the way to Augusta, Georgia.

After merging with the Atlantic Coast Line, the Richmond and Petersburg line became the northernmost segment of the Atlantic Coast Line's main line (which would extend as far south as Tampa, Florida). The Atlantic Coast Line and the Richmond, Fredericksburg and Potomac Railroad jointly built Broad Street Station in 1916 and consolidated their passenger operations there. With passenger service relocated to Broad Street Station, passenger trains began using the Belt Line (which then became the main line) to access the station from the south. To accommodate the additional traffic, the Belt Line was double tracked and realigned at the south end to join the original main line at what is now FA Junction. The current double-tracked arch bridge over the James River was complete in 1919. Though, some foundations of the Richmond and Petersburg Railroad's original bridge for the Belt Line remain beside the current bridge.

In 1967, the Atlantic Coast Line merged with its rival, the Seaboard Air Line Railroad. The merged company was named the Seaboard Coast Line Railroad, and the Atlantic Coast Line's main line was then known as the A Line. In 1980, the Seaboard Coast Line's parent company merged with the Chessie System (successor of the Chesapeake and Ohio Railway), creating the CSX Corporation. The CSX Corporation initially operated the Chessie and Seaboard Systems separately until 1986, when they were merged into CSX Transportation.

The A Line is still used today by Amtrak and CSX. It is CSX's North End Subdivision. Part of the original route of the Richmond and Petersburg Railroad north of FA Junction is still in place and it is now CSX's Clopton Lead.

== Presidents ==
- W. H. McFarland
- Wirt Robinson (May 27, 1851 or before – ?)
- Holden Rhodes
- Charles Ellis (1860 or before – November 29, 1870)
- Thomas H. Wynne (November 29, 1870 – )
- Frederick R. Scott (1874 – 1898), President Pro Tempore in 1874

== Cars ==
The Richmond and Petersburg had 10 locomotives, 7 passenger cars, 3 baggage cars, 71 freight cars and 6 other cars, including cabooses in 1893. It had Janney couplers, semi-automatic couplers, on the locomotive and passenger cars and automatic links on the others; Westinghouse automatic brakes automatic brakes on the locomotives, Westinghouse air brakes on the passenger cars and hand brakes on the other cars.

== Employees ==
Before the end of the Civil War, enslaved Africans did much of the work on the Railroad. In 1864 118 slaves worked on the railroad and only 78 paid employees. Slaves drove the passenger-carrying horse-drawn omnibuses and the wagons, worked in the maintenance shops as mechanics and shopmen, worked in the Depots and office, worked at the Clover Hill and other stations, worked as firemen and train hands on the train, worked as section men and repaired tracks, worked on the gravel train shoveling gravel and bringing materials and chopped wood to provide the fuel for the trains. Paid employees managed the slave workers and included copper smiths, carpenters and painters, acted as inspectors worked as ticket agents and clerks and were the officers of the company. The railroad company owned one slave in 1858 and leased the other slaves.

After the war there were only paid employees. By 1893, the Richmond and Petersburg employed ten general officers and 32 men at the stations. Ten enginemen ran the engines on the locomotives, 13 Firemen shoveled coal, six conductors kept the trains on schedule and 19 other men worked on the trains. Five machinists and five carpenters worked in the shop with six other shopmen. Four section foreman, eight other trackmen and 44 flagmen, watchers and switchers worked on the rails. Telegraph operators ran telegraphs that went up and down the rails and to other lines. Nearly one hundred other laborers were employed.

Working on the trains was dangerous, eight men working on the train were killed in 1893 and two were injured. Two other employees, three passengers and two unrelated people off of the train were also injured.

== Passengers and cargo ==
The trains carried several hundred thousand passengers a year. The freight cars shipped lumber, fruits and vegetables, tobacco, grain and flour, hay, iron, cement and brick, lime, coal, meat, poultry, game, fish, cotton, wool, leather, wine, liquor and beer, wagons and carriages, farm tools, other tools, iron rails and boat parts.

== Stations ==
Main Line

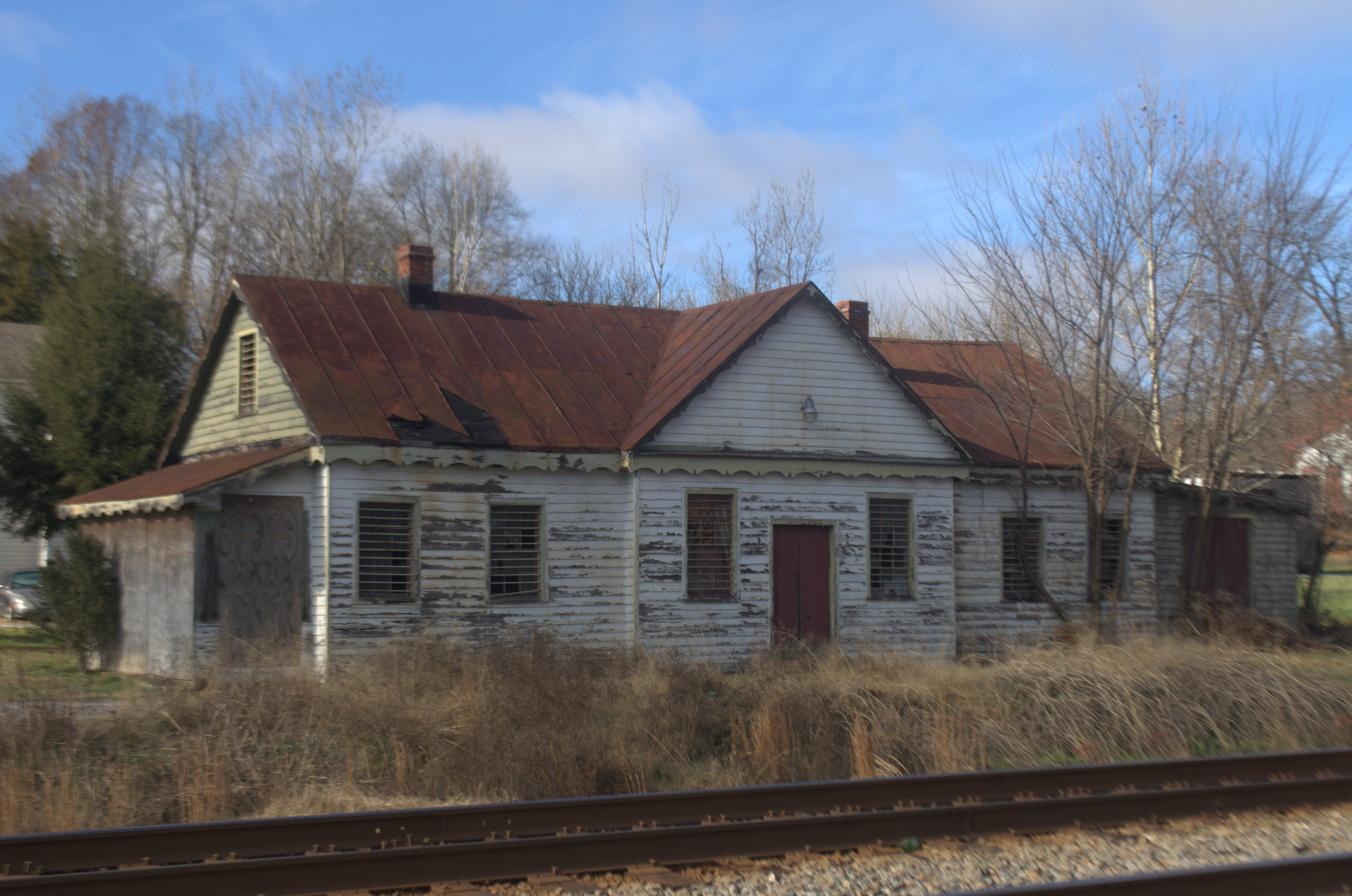
Former Centralia Station of the Richmond and Petersburg Railroad

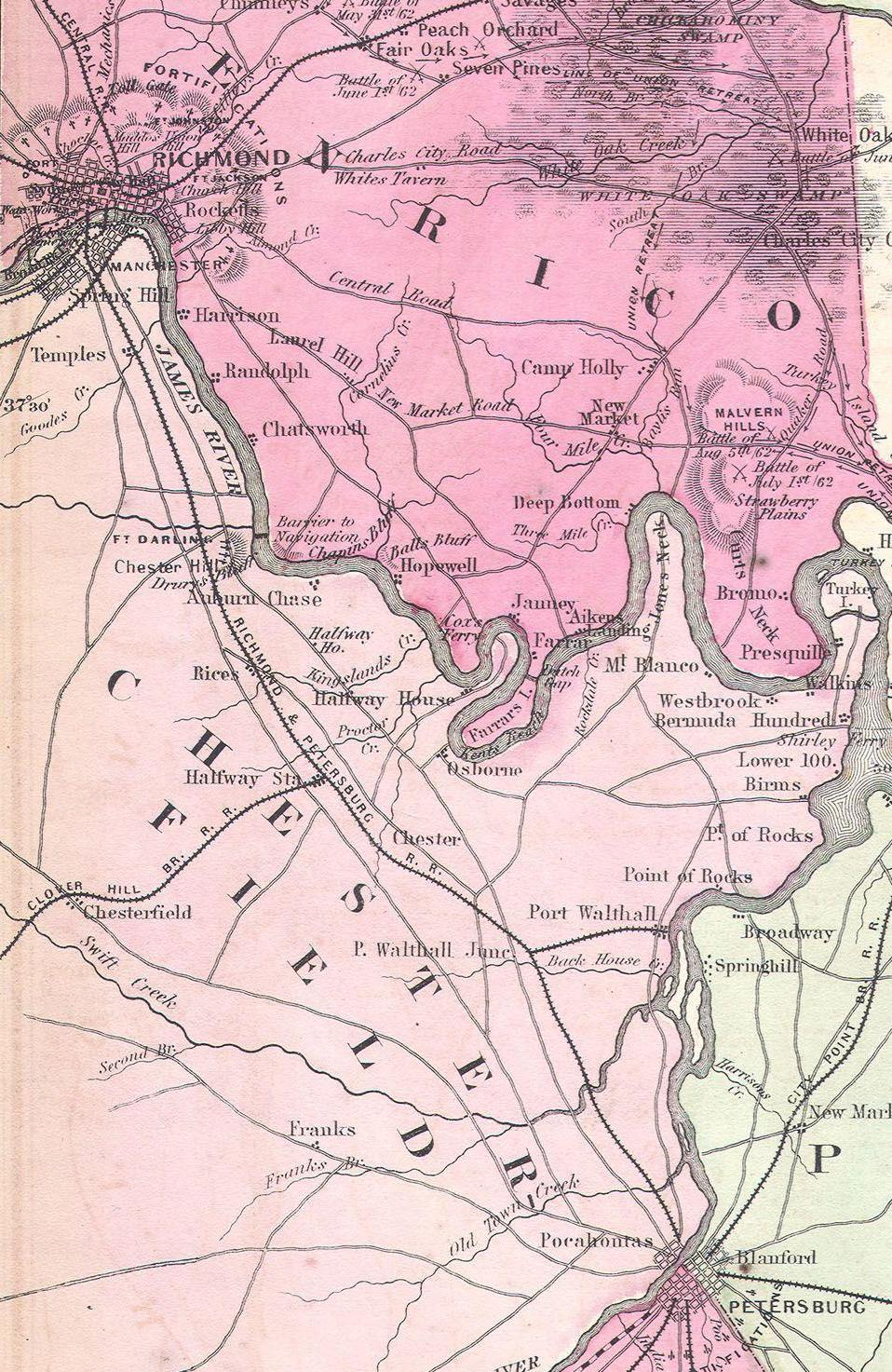
1862 Map Showing the Richmond and Petersburg Railroad with the connection to the Clover Hill and other Railroads.

Milepost	City/Location	Station	Connections and notes
AR 0.0	Richmond	Byrd Street Station	junction with Richmond, Fredericksburg and Potomac Railroad
	Richmond	Bridge over James River	
AR 1.6	Richmond	Manchester	junction with Richmond and Danville Railroad (SOU)
AR 3.3	Richmond	Clopton	
AR 5.0	Richmond	Temple's	
A 5.5	Richmond	FA Junction	junction with Belt Line
A 5.9		Falling Creek	
A 8.7		Drewry's Bluff	also known as Bell Bluff
A 10.7		Centralia	
A 11.0		Half Way Station	Water stop
A 12.8		Chester	junction with Richmond, Petersburg and Carolina Railroad (SAL)
A 13.2		Clover Hill Junction	junction with Clover Hill Railroad (Brighthope Railway)
A 17.0		Walthall	originally Port Walthall Junction
A 19.4		Dunlop	
		Bridge over Appomattox River	
A 22.0	Petersburg	Petersburg	replaced by Petersburg Union Station in 1910, which was replaced by the current station in 1955 (which is located on a bypass track around Petersburg built in the 1930s) junction with: Petersburg Railroad (ACL); Southside Railroad (N&W)

Belt Line

Milepost	City/Location	Station	Connections and notes
	Richmond	Broad Street Station	opened in 1917 located on Richmond, Fredericksburg and Potomac Railroad
ARN 3.6	Richmond	AY Interlocking	junction with Richmond, Fredericksburg and Potomac Railroad
ARN 0.0; A 0.0	Richmond	Bridge over James River	
A 1.0	Richmond	Meadow	
A 5.5	Richmond	FA Junction	junction with Main Line
