= Port Walthall =

- Former town
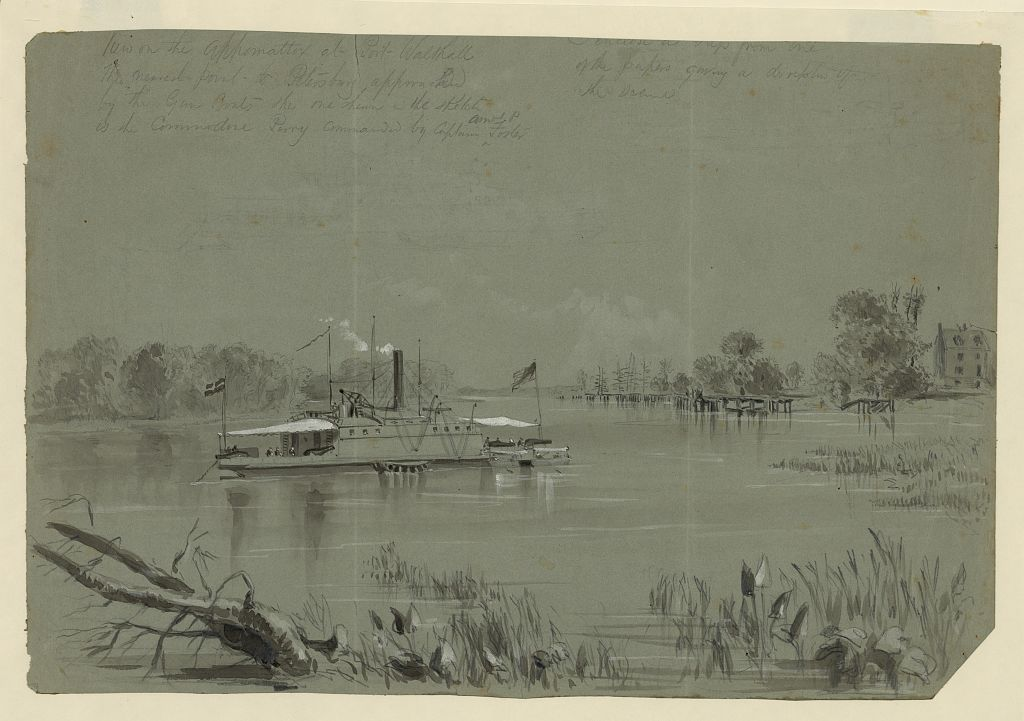
- Sketch of the Appomattox at Port Walthall by William Waud, the USS Commodore Perry is visible in the foreground.
- Etymology: William Walthall
- Interactive map of Port Walthall
- Coordinates: 37°18′N 77°21′W
- Country: United States
- State: Virginia
- County: Chesterfield
- Established: 1840

Port Walthall was a town located on the north bank of the Appomattox River in Chesterfield County, Virginia, United States, a few miles upriver from its confluence with the James River at City Point.

== Etymology ==
Port Walthall was part of 1600 acres patented by William Walthall, Merchant, 26 July 1656, land "Lying and being in the county of Henrico, on the north side of Appomatuck River." William Walthall's ancestors were members of the Mercers Company in London who held stock in the Virginia Company and descended from Thomas Walthall, born circa 1450, Nantwich, Cheshire, and Margaret, daughter of Sir William Stanley of Hooten.

== History ==
The James River boats, on a summer arrangement in 1837, connected round trip from Petersburg or Richmond to Norfolk. From Norfolk the Steamer COLUMBIA connected to District of Columbia and the steamboat KENTUCKY connected to Spear's wharf, Baltimore.

The Town of Port Walthall was established in 1840.

== Clover Hill Pits ==
Port Walthall was on a Spur of the Richmond and Petersburg Railroad from 1846 to the Reconstruction era. The spur was built to get coal from the Clover Hill Pits to Port Walthall to be shipped north by coastal ships.

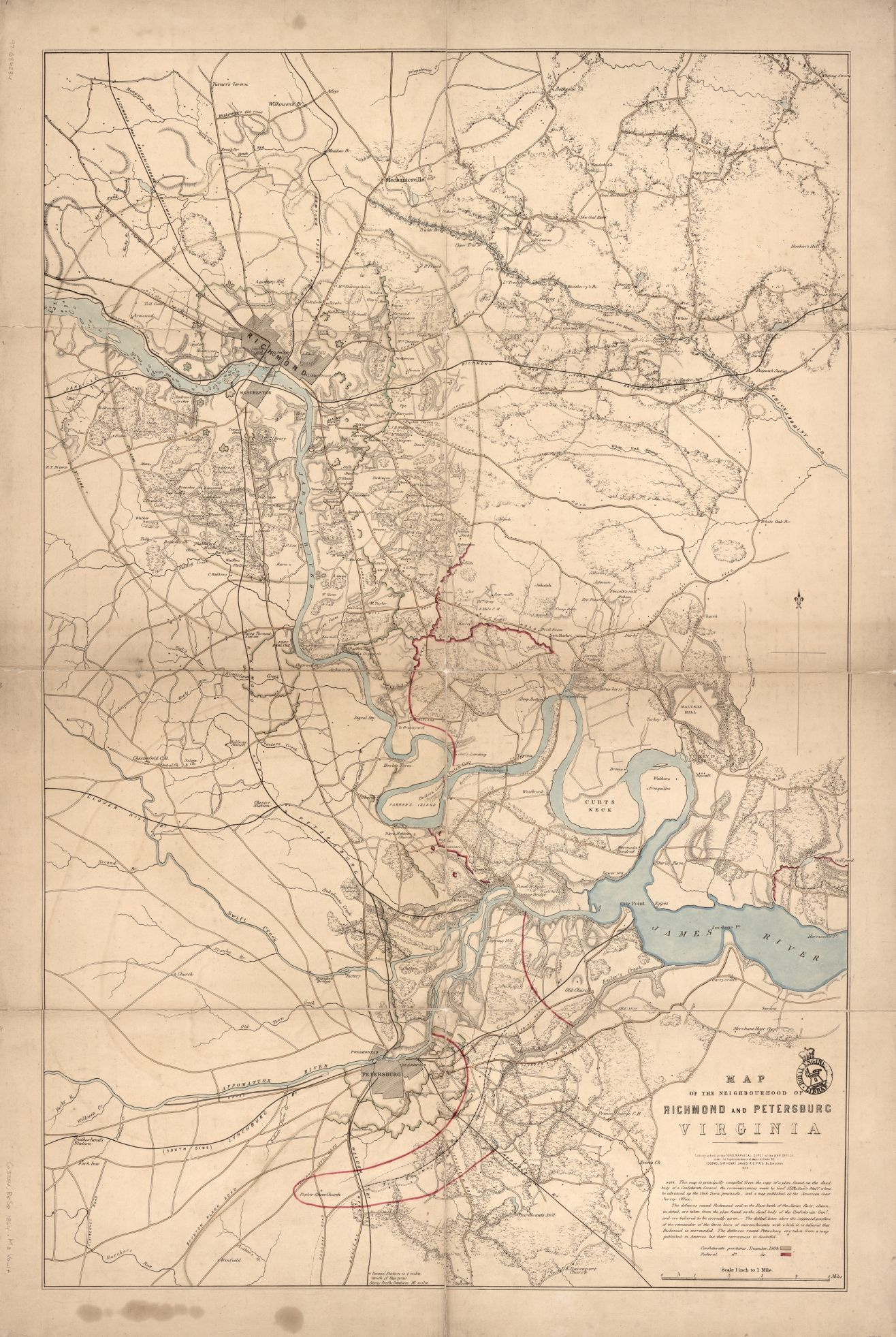
Map of the neighbourhood of Port Walthall, Virginia 1866

As part of the competition for commerce between Richmond and Petersburg, Wirt and Moncure Robinson, presidents of the Richmond and Petersburg Railroad and one other Railroad, built the branch line from the R&P to Port Walthall. They also financed a Steamship Company owned by the R&P. The company was forbidden to make purchase of other companies, to prevent other steamship companies from fearing a large monopoly and refusing to facilitate connections north or engaging in competition. The railroad presidents merely wanted to compete with Petersburg and did not mind making these concessions. A Newspaper Editor in Petersburg was not happy with this development.

The proposed charter of the steamship company was debated by the Virginia House of Delegates and was granted.

== Port Walthall Steamship Company ==
Port Walthall Steamship Company
- Industry: Steamships
- Founded: May 22, 1846 in Richmond, Virginia, United States
- Founders: Moncure Robinson and Wirt Robinson
- Headquarters: Richmond, Virginia, United States
- Areas served: Richmond, Virginia, Petersburg, Virginia, Norfolk, Virginia and Old Point Comfort
- Products: Water transportation
- Owners: Nicholas Mills, G.A. Myers, W. H Macfarland, Moncure Robinson, George Tucker, A. Worrall and W.E. Horner

The Port Walthall Steamship Company was formed in 1846 by the Richmond and Petersburg Railroad. The company was chartered to book passengers through Old Point Comfort in Norfolk, Virginia but no further. The Richmond and Petersburg Railroad provided repairs for and managed a joint schedule for point to point transportation through to Norfolk. Later the Richmond, Fredericksburg and Potomac Railroad also bought into the company. The tracks underwent some maintenance in 1849 and the governor remarked that the train had never had an accident or had ever been late and missed the steamship in three years.

The steamship Augusta was retrofitted in 1853 with lifeboats, lifebuoys and force pumps as required by the United States Congress for safety. Passengers could leave Richmond or Petersburg by train three days a week at 6:00 A.M. and transfer to the Steamship headed for Norfolk. They could return from Norfolk three days a week leaving at 6:00 A.M and ride the train back from Port Walthall to Richmond or Petersburg. The fare was $2 for White adults, $1.50 for enslaved Africans and $1 for children if they went the whole way to Norfolk or New Point Comfort. Fares were less if they stopped along the river. Meals were fifty cents for white people and 25 cents for slaves. Coal was loaded at Port Walthall and shipped to places like Baltimore and Philadelphia by other shippers.

== Civil War ==
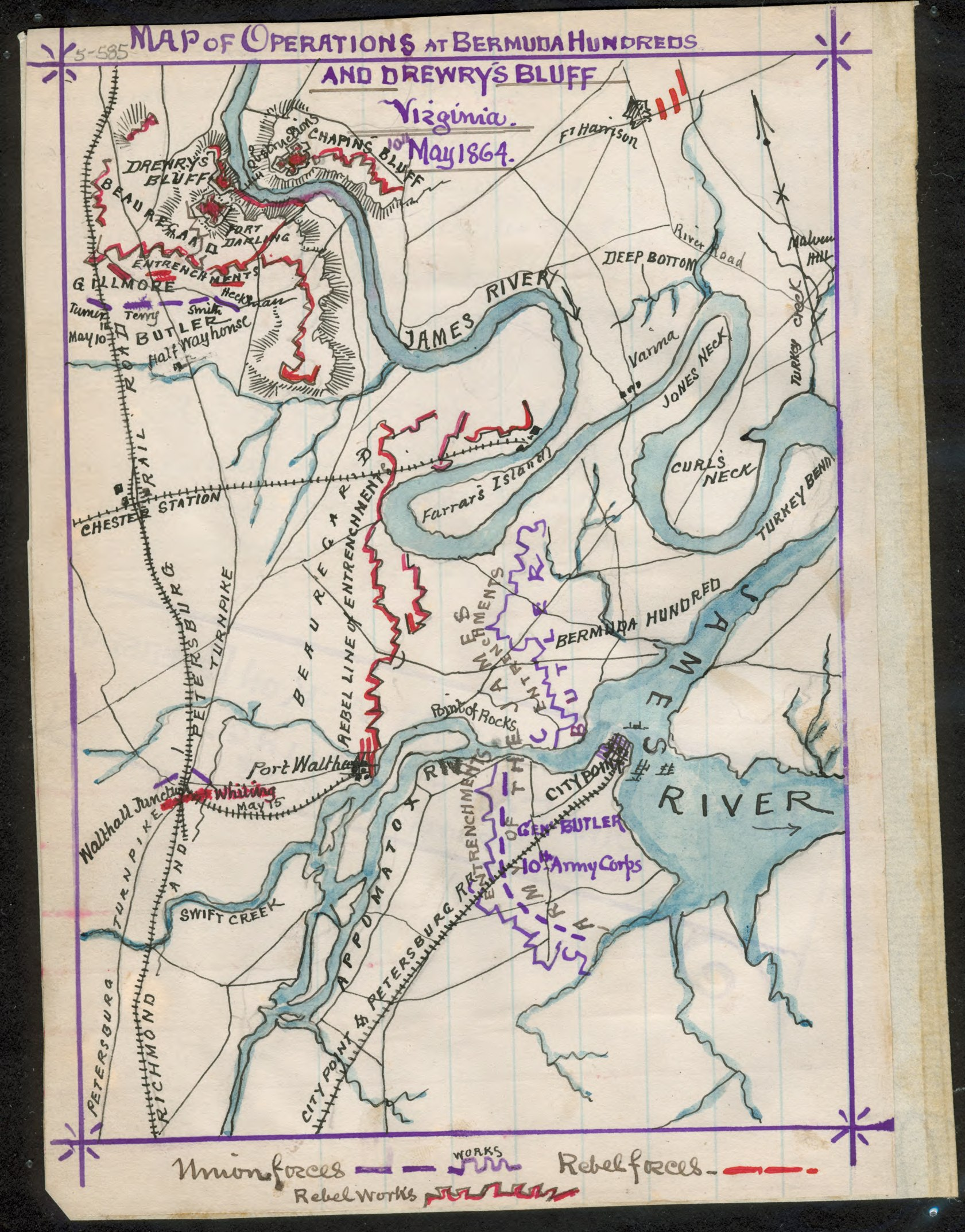
Lee's Map of the Bermuda Hundred battle of Port Walthall

The Battle of Port Walthall Junction was fought on May 6–7, 1864, between Union and Confederate forces during the American Civil War. The point where the Port Walthall tracks joined the Richmond and Petersburg Railroad was known as Port Walthall Junction. The Confederates were eventually defeated, allowing Union forces to cut the railroad, one of Richmond's vital supply lines. Confederate soldiers later melted down the railroad tracks leading to the port to manufacture cannon.

== Reconstruction ==
After the Civil War, Thomas M. Logan, who twenty years later modernized railroads of Virginia, became president of the Port Walthall Spur of the Richmond and Petersburg Railroad. The railroad branch to Port Walthall was never restored, and Port Walthall came into disuse. An 1891 map of the Richmond and Petersburg Railroad shows a carriage road going to the town from the stop on the main line. An 1893 Richmond and Petersburg Railroad company prospectus does not show the spur to Port Walthall in the miles of track section. However, as late as 1872, vessels larger than 200 tonnes could dock at Port Walthall, six miles down the Appomattox River from Petersburg on the north bank.

== Small Pox Quarantine 1906 ==
The school in the town of Port Walthall was temporarily closed due to a smallpox outbreak in 1906.

== Today ==
In modern times, the name was memorialized as the Walthall exit of Interstate 95, now known as Exit 58. The Walthall name was abandoned in the early 1990s when Virginia adopted distance based numbers for exits.
