= Chester, Virginia =

- CDP
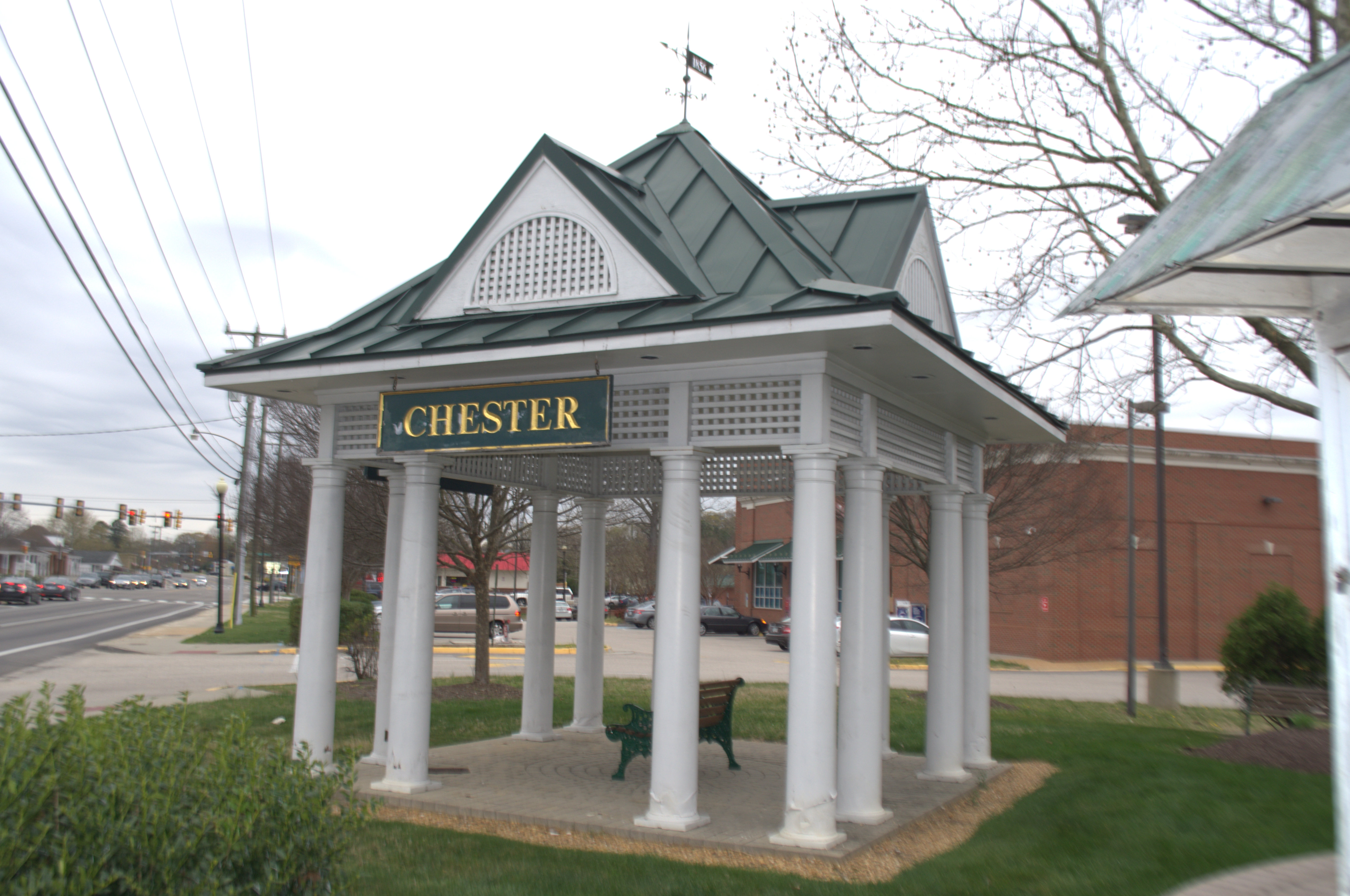
- Chester Station replica in downtown Chester

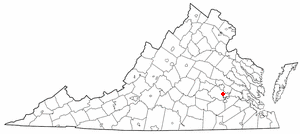
- Location of Chester, Virginia
- Coordinates: 37°21′12″N 77°26′9″W
- Country: United States
- State: Virginia
- County: Chesterfield

Area
  - Total: 13.3 sq mi (34.4 km^{2})
  - Land: 13.2 sq mi (34.1 km^{2})
  - Water: 0.12 sq mi (0.3 km^{2})
- Elevation: 174 ft (53 m)

Population (2020)
  - Total: 23,414
  - Density: 1,780/sq mi (687/km^{2})
- Time zone: UTC-5 (Eastern (EST))
  - Summer (DST): UTC-4 (EDT)
- ZIP codes: 23831, 23836
- Area code: 804
- FIPS code: 51-16096
- GNIS feature ID: 1492754

Chester is a census-designated place (CDP) in Chesterfield County, Virginia, United States. Per the 2020 census, the population was 23,414.

== History ==
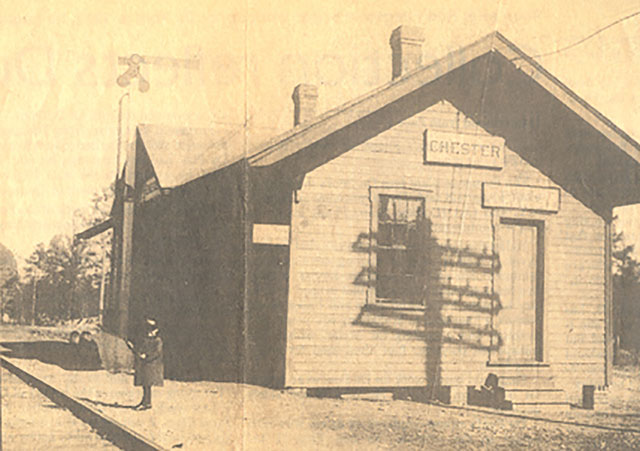
Chester, Virginia station on the Seaboard Air Line, 1914

Chester's original "downtown" was a stop which was an intersection of the Richmond and Petersburg Railroad, running north to south, and the Clover Hill Railroad, which became the Brighthope Railway, then the Farmville and Powhatan Railroad. In 1900, when the Richmond and Petersburg merged with the Atlantic Coast Line, that new railroad intersected the same east west railroad which became the Tidewater and Western Railroad in 1905.

The Seaboard Air Line also passed through in 1900 running north to south which to day is replaced with Chester Linear Park. Chester today is a bedroom community along State Route 10. Recent commercial development in Chester has emerged at the sprawling intersection of SR 10 and U.S. Route 1 (Jefferson Davis Highway) near the on-ramp to Interstate 95.

In April, 1781, during the American Revolution, the Osborne's Landing area of Chester was the site of the Action at Osborne's in which General Benedict Arnold destroyed much of Virginia's navy.

In May, 1864, the Chester Station was the scene of the Battle of Chester Station during the Bermuda Hundred Campaign of the American Civil War. The area was damaged by Hurricane Isabel in 2003.

== Geography ==
Chester is located at 37°21′12″N 77°26′9″W (37.353449, -77.435767).

According to the United States Census Bureau, the CDP has a total area of 13.3 square miles (34.4 km^{2}), of which 13.2 square miles (34.1 km^{2}) is land, and 0.12 square miles (0.3 km^{2}) (0.90%) is water.

== Demographics ==
Historical population
Census	Pop.	Note	%±
1960	1,290		—
1970	5,556		330.7%
1980	11,728		111.1%
1990	14,986		27.8%
2000	17,890		19.4%
2010	20,987		17.3%
2020	23,414		11.6%
U.S. Decennial Census; 2010 2020

=== Racial and ethnic composition ===
Chester CDP, Virginia – Racial and ethnic composition Note: the US Census treats Hispanic/Latino as an ethnic category. This table excludes Latinos from the racial categories and assigns them to a separate category. Hispanics/Latinos may be of any race.
Race / Ethnicity (NH = Non-Hispanic)	Pop 2000	Pop 2010	Pop 2020	% 2000	% 2010	% 2020
White alone (NH)	14,242	14,182	13,025	79.61%	67.58%	55.63%
Black or African American alone (NH)	2,368	4,010	5,644	13.24%	19.11%	24.11%
Native American or Alaska Native alone (NH)	77	73	57	0.43%	0.35%	0.24%
Asian alone (NH)	382	465	493	2.14%	2.22%	2.11%
Native Hawaiian or Pacific Islander alone (NH)	15	9	20	0.08%	0.04%	0.09%
Other race alone (NH)	16	38	167	0.09%	0.18%	0.71%
Mixed race or Multiracial (NH)	243	449	973	1.36%	2.14%	4.16%
Hispanic or Latino (any race)	547	1,761	3,035	3.06%	8.39%	12.96%
Total	17,890	20,987	23,414	100.00%	100.00%	100.00%

=== 2020 census ===
As of the 2020 census, Chester had a population of 23,414. The median age was 38.2 years. 24.7% of residents were under the age of 18 and 16.1% of residents were 65 years of age or older. For every 100 females there were 88.8 males, and for every 100 females age 18 and over there were 85.8 males age 18 and over.

100.0% of residents lived in urban areas, while 0.0% lived in rural areas.

There were 9,014 households in Chester, of which 34.8% had children under the age of 18 living in them. Of all households, 46.9% were married-couple households, 15.6% were households with a male householder and no spouse or partner present, and 31.1% were households with a female householder and no spouse or partner present. About 24.9% of all households were made up of individuals and 10.8% had someone living alone who was 65 years of age or older.

There were 9,390 housing units, of which 4.0% were vacant. The homeowner vacancy rate was 1.2% and the rental vacancy rate was 4.5%.

Racial composition as of the 2020 census
Race	Number	Percent
White	13,415	57.3%
Black or African American	5,768	24.6%
American Indian and Alaska Native	143	0.6%
Asian	499	2.1%
Native Hawaiian and Other Pacific Islander	21	0.1%
Some other race	1,816	7.8%
Two or more races	1,752	7.5%

=== 2000 census ===
At the 2000 census, there were 17,890 people, 6,727 households and 5,119 families residing in the CDP. The population density was 531.7 people/km^{2} (1,377 people/mi^{2}). There were 6,951 housing units at an average density of 206.6 units/km^{2} (535 units/mi^{2}). The racial makeup of the CDP was 81.3% White, 13.4% African American, 0.4% Native American, 2.2% Asian, 0.1% Pacific Islander, 1.0% from other races, and 1.5% from two or more races. Hispanic or Latino of any race were 3.1% of the population.

There were 6,727 households, of which 40.0% had children under the age of 18 living with them, 58.2% were married couples living together, 14.0% had a female householder with no husband present, and 23.9% were non-families. 19.0% of all households were made up of individuals, and 4.7% had someone living alone who was 65 years of age or older. The average household size was 2.66 and the average family size was 3.04.

Age distribution was 28.3% under the age of 18, 7.9% from 18 to 24, 31.4% from 25 to 44, 24.2% from 45 to 64, and 8.3% who were 65 years of age or older. The median age was 35 years. For every 100 females, there were 94.9 males. For every 100 females age 18 and over, there were 92.2 males.

The median household income was $53,171, and the median family income was $60,632. Males had a median income of $44,167 versus $30,295 for females. The per capita income for the CDP was $23,258. About 6.5% of families and 8.0% of the population were below the poverty line, including 12.2% of those under age 18 and 4.0% of those age 65 or over.

== Local media ==
Chester was served by the local newspaper The Village News. It ceased publication in December 2022. Chester is also in the Richmond-Petersburg media market served by the Richmond Times-Dispatch.

== Education ==
Chester is served by Chesterfield County Public Schools. Students are also able to apply to Appomattox Regional Governor's School for the Arts And Technology and Maggie L. Walker Governor's School for Government and International Studies.

Schools include Thomas Dale High School, Matoaca High School, L. C. Bird High School, Carver Middle School, Enon Elementary, Marguerite Christian Elementary, C.E. Curtis Elementary, C.C. Wells Elementary, Ecoff Elementary, Harrowgate Elementary, Elizabeth N. Scott Elementary, and Elizabeth Davis Middle School.

The city is also home to Brightpoint Community College (originally known as John Tyler Community College). During the 2020–21 school year, Brightpoint served nearly 13,000 students.

== Notable people ==
- Will Bates (b. 1991) – soccer player
- Roger Bothe (b. 1988) – soccer player
- Nate Eaton (b. 1996) – Major League Baseball (MLB) player
- Jordan Evans (b. 1987) – soccer player
- Ken Oxendine (b. 1975) – National Football League (NFL) player and educator
- C. J. Reavis (b. 1995) – NFL and Canadian Football League (CFL) player
- William C. Trueheart (1918–1992) – US ambassador to Nigeria
- Chris Tyree (b. 2001) – college football player
- Lacey Waldrop (b. 1993) – college softball player and coach
- Wyatt Tee Walker (1928–2018) – pastor, civil rights activist, theologian, and cultural historian
