= Moncure Robinson =

American civil engineer and railroad executive (1802-1891)

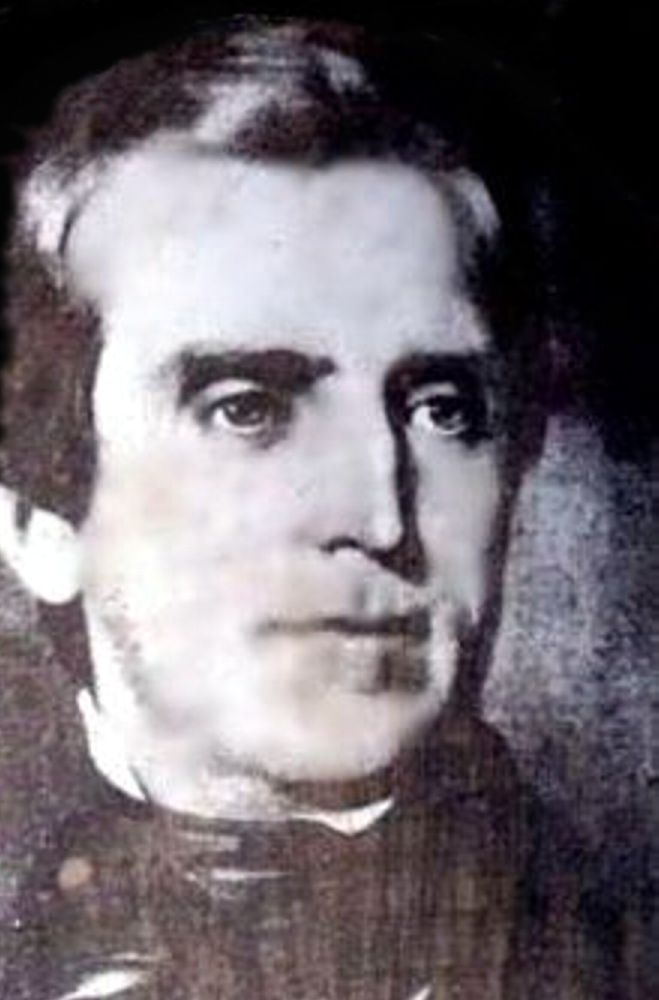
- Born: February 2, 1802; Richmond, Virginia, U.S.
- Died: November 10, 1891 (aged 89); Philadelphia, Pennsylvania, U.S.
- Resting place: Laurel Hill Cemetery, Philadelphia, Pennsylvania, U.S.
- Occupations: Civil engineer, financier
- Known for: The Philadelphia & Reading Railroad

Moncure Robinson (February 2, 1802 – November 10, 1891) was an American civil engineer and railroad executive. He was one of the leading engineers for railroad survey and construction projects from the 1820s to the 1840s. He conducted surveys for and constructed multiple railroad lines including the Danville and Pottsville Railroad, the Allegheny Portage Railroad, the Chesterfield Railroad, the Petersburg Railroad, the Richmond and Petersburg Railroad, the Richmond, Fredericksburg and Potomac Railroad, the Winchester and Potomac Railroad, the Raleigh and Gaston Railroad, and the Philadelphia & Reading Railroad.

He was a principal stockholder and director of several rail and water transport companies including the Baltimore Steam Packet Company and the Seaboard and Roanoke Railroad.

== Early life and education ==
Moncure Robinson was born on February 2, 1802, in Richmond, Virginia, to Agnes Conway Moncure and John Robinson. He attended the Gerardine School in Richmond, and graduated from College of William and Mary at the age of 16.

From 1825 to 1827, Robinson traveled to Europe to study civil engineering with private tutors and public lectures. He studied mechanical engineering at the Sorbonne in Paris and traveled to England to observe the construction of the Liverpool and Manchester Railway led by George Stephenson. While traveling in England, he met two young Americans, Henry Seybert and Nathaniel Chauncey, who were politically connected and were able to secure Robinson a position with the Pennsylvania canal commission upon his return to the United States.

== Career ==
=== Early surveys ===
Although denied a job because of his youth, the enthusiastic 16-year-old Robinson was allowed to accompany the surveyors as a volunteer. On returning to Virginia, Robinson worked as an engineer's assistant with the James River Company, apprenticing on survey work for canals in his native state. Three years later, the Virginia Board of Public Works hired Robinson to assist in locating an extension for the James River Canal. Robinson traveled to New York to view the construction of the Erie Canal, over a less hilly route than contemplated in Virginia. That visit convinced him of the advantages of railroads over canals both as a means of transportation and in commerce. His report to the Virginia Board of Public Works disputed the benefits of further canal development, and praised railroads in its place. Faced with an unenthusiastic response, Robinson resigned his position and, at that moment, devoted himself to developing railroads.

=== Railroad construction ===
In 1816, General John Hartwell Cocke, known for his advocacy of the James River Canal, provided 17 year old Robinson with a letter of introduction to 61 year old William Short, who had moved to Philadelphia after assisting Thomas Jefferson in France and later President James Monroe in Russia. Despite the age difference, Short became a close friend, as well as investor in Robinson's railroad projects, and may have convinced Robinson to move his family to Philadelphia. Initially, Short probably provided Robinson with letters of introduction for Robinson's engineering studies in Britain and France in 1823, and progressed to helped Robinson obtain support from Philadelphia financier Stephen Girard, who was financing construction of railroads in Pennsylvania (especially the Danville and Pottsville Railroad, i.e. "D & P").

Upon Robinson's return, in 1828–1829, Pennsylvania hired Robinson to survey parts of the state's anthracite coal regions, the upper Susquehanna River canal system, and the D & P connecting the upper Susquehanna and Schuylkill rivers' canal systems with the coal fields in between. Robinson remained an early advocate of railroads over canals, and came to direct construction of several of the earliest railroads in the country, including parts of the D & P railroad and inclines during the early 1830s. However, by 1836, after Robinson's various railroad leadership positions in Pennsylvania and Virginia described below, Gen. Cocke would condemn Robinson as an enemy to his greatest work of internal improvements in Virginia.

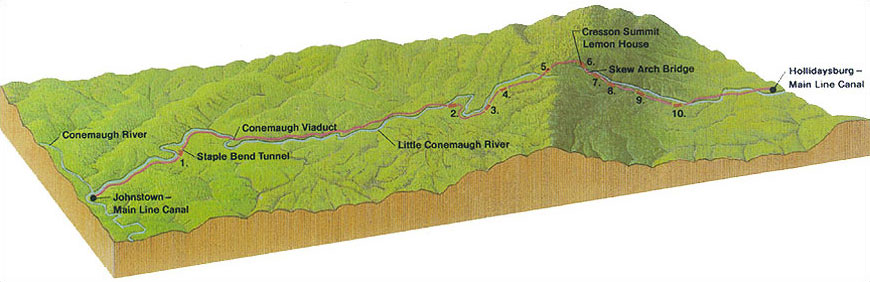
Profile of the original line of the Allegheny Portage Railroad from Hollidaysburg, Pennsylvania to Johnstown, Pennsylvania

In 1829, Pennsylvania's "Main Line of Public Works" hired Robinson to survey part of the canal and railroad route from Philadelphia to Pittsburgh. His best known early work was the survey and design of the Allegheny Portage Railroad, the 36 mile combination of ten inclines and level railroad over the Allegheny Mountains, Hollidaysburg to Johnstown, which connected the state's canal on the east side with another state-subsidized canal in the Ohio River drainage on the west. The railroad carried supply laden boats loaded from one canal, onto the train and then into the subsequent canal.

Robinson also surveyed lines in the Mahanoy and Shamokin coal lands, eventually acquiring a part of the lands. He was civil engineer for the Little Schuylkill Railroad, 1830–1831, and for what would become the Catawissa Railroad in the anthracite country (all later part of the Reading). All had inclines and connected to canals—still within the early British tradition of railroads being an adjunct to water/canal transport systems. While building one of the short coal railroads of the anthracite region, Robinson also served as post master of Port Clinton, Pennsylvania, where an early home of his still stands.

Robinson built the Chesterfield Railroad, a thirteen-mile coal road with incline, the first railroad in Virginia, completed in 1831. Robinson also directed construction of other short lines around Richmond such as the Petersburg Railroad, the Richmond and Petersburg Railroad, and the Richmond, Fredericksburg and Potomac Railroad. In 1833, at age 31, Robinson became head engineer for the Winchester and Potomac Railroad.

In 1833–1834, Robinson also surveyed a railroad in the Tamaqua coal fields, directed further D & P construction in the Shamokin Valley, and another built another coal line near Pottsville. During 1834–1840, Robinson became the first chief engineer of the new Philadelphia and Reading Railroad.

Horses and mules, gravity and stationary steam engines on inclines, were the first motive power on Moncure Robinson's railroads. Though Robinson held patents on incline systems, from the beginning, he recommended British built locomotives for railroads, especially the recently perfected 0-4-0s with Bury fire box. By the mid-1830s, American mechanics had perfected the 4-2-0, with its lead swivel truck or pilot wheels – designed by John B Jervis for the Mohawk & Hudson – and Robinson recommended these for steeper grade railroads during the late 1830s, in Virginia and Pennsylvania. For the Reading, he ordered British and American made locomotives. For more power, however, he helped design in 1839 one of the earliest 4-4-0 locomotives, the "Gowan & Marx," named after his London banker. The most powerful locomotive up to that time was built by Eastwick & Harrison of Philadelphia, and proved ideal for the coal fields tapped by the Reading.

In 1836, Robinson was a consulting engineer for the construction of the Raleigh and Gaston Railroad.

In 1840, Robinson declined an offer from the Czar of Russia to direct an ambitious railroad building program, but did recommend the firm of Eastwick and Harrison, who built the first railroad line in Russia. About this time he broadened his consulting work, providing reports on the proposed New York & Erie Railroad, the New York Harbor improvements, and other projects. In 1839, with Benjamin Latrobe, John Jervis, J Edgar Thomson, Claudius Crozet, Horatio Allen, Henry Campbell (and others), Robinson helped organize the American Society of Civil Engineers in Philadelphia. When the organization languished, Robinson helped form a new American Society of Civil Engineers in New York in 1852, and the following year the new organization bestowed one of its highest honors on Robinson by electing him an honorary member.

While working on the Reading, Robinson undertook other railroad projects. He built the bridge across the James River between Manchester and Richmond, Virginia for the Richmond and Petersburg Railroad which was completed in 1838. This 19-span bridge was an impressive Town lattice truss bridge built in wood.

In 1842, the United States Government hired Robinson to consult in the construction of the enormous dry dock at the Brooklyn Navy Yard.

=== Manager and financier ===
By the late 1840s Robinson was moving away from civil engineering, and toward management and finance. After successfully raising funds in England for the Reading railroad in the 1830s, he turned to financing and directing project. Robinson became an active stockholder and/or director of various rail and water transport companies—the Baltimore Steam Packet Company, the Seaboard and Roanoke Railroad, the Chesapeake & Delaware Canal, Chester Valley Railroad, Pennsylvania Railroad, and the Philadelphia, Wilmington and Baltimore Railroad.

After the American Civil War, Robinson had connections in both the North and South and was in excellent position to rebuild the ruined railroad infrastructure of the South. Moncure Robinson, his son John Moncure Robinson, former Confederate general William Mahone and North Carolina businessman Alexander Boyd Andrews successfully worked with investors to consolidate a series of short-line railroads into what became the Seaboard Air Line Railroad and ship system. They foiled an attempt by Thomas A. Scott, who had risen through the ranks of the Pennsylvania Railroad and acquired the Chesapeake and Ohio Railroad after the war, to build a system along the eastern seaboard. Instead, John Moncure Robinson became superintendent then president of this major, 800-mile (1,300 km) southern trunk line, from Norfolk and Richmond, Virginia to Atlanta, Georgia and Birmingham, Alabama.

== Personal life ==
Both of Robinson's parents were from the First Families of Virginia. The Robinson family presence in Virginia dates to 1688 at New Charles Parish. His brother Conway Robinson was a politician who served in the Virginia House of Delegates.

In 1833, he was elected to the American Philosophical Society.

Robinson married Charlotte Randolph Taylor in 1835. Likewise a member of the First Families of Virginia, her grandfather Edmund Randolph was the nation's first attorney general, and numerous other Randolphs likewise distinguished (even President Thomas Jefferson could trace Randolph family descent). Their sons were John Moncure Robinson (1835-1893) and Edmund Randolph Robinson; their unmarried daughter Natalie Robinson lived at home in 1880. The family lived in Philadelphia, Pennsylvania beginning in 1835.

== Death and legacy ==
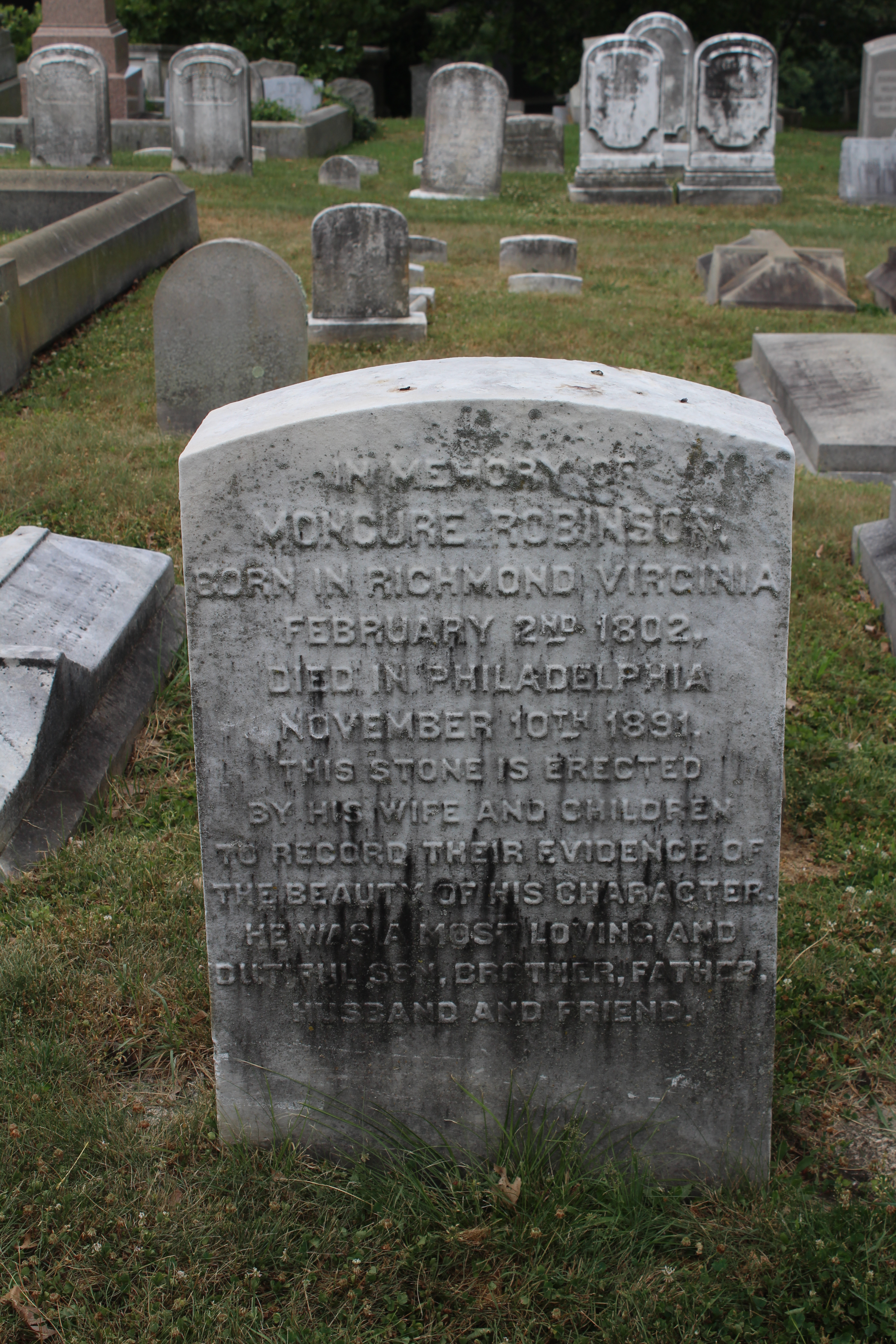
Moncure Robinson tombstone in Laurel Hill Cemetery

Robinson died on November 10, 1891, in Philadelphia and was interred at Laurel Hill Cemetery. He had survived his brother Conway Robinson by seven years (although Conway's body would be returned to Richmond for burial). Moncure Robinson's widow survived him by four years; their son and railroadman John M. Robinson reconciled with his father in their last years but only survived him by two years. Eulogists remembered that as a young man, Moncure Robinson had been one of the new Republic's first railroad civil engineers. Robinson wrote his will on September 11, 1873 (months before Conway's death), and left an endowment for preservation of the Aquia Episcopal Church, Aquia, Virginia (his grandfather was reverend there, and his parents and many cousins of various degrees of descent are buried there—the Robinson trust still funds the cemetery's maintenance). His personal papers and the papers of the Robinson family are held by the Special Collections Research Center at the College of William and Mary.

=== Reputation ===
Robinson became the leading railroad engineer in the United States, attained an international reputation for engineering excellence and executive talent, and during his retirement continued to consult on various railroad projects. Called "one of the most distinguished civil engineers in the United States" and the "genius of America's earliest railways," Robinson was instrumental in the early development and growth of the country's great railroad system. He influenced Frederick List, called the "Father of German Railroads" and Michel Chevalier, the Minister of Public Works under Louis Philippe and the most eminent engineer in France.

== Publications ==
- Francis William Rawle, Moncure Robinson. Central Rail Road: Reports of the Engineers of the Danville and Pottsville Rail Road Company; with the Report of the Committee of the Board Thereon, October 15, 1831. Danville and Pottsville Rail Road Company. Clark & Raser, 1831
- Moncure Robinson. Report on the Continuation of the Little Schuylkill Rail Road: From Port Clinton to Reading. J. and W. Kite, printers, 1834
- Moncure Robinson, Jonathan Knight, Benjamin Hall Wright. Report of M. Robinson ... Jonathan Knight ... and Benjamin Wright ... Civil Engineers, upon the plan of the New-York and Erie Rail Road. Scott & Company, 1835
- Moncure Robinson. Report of Moncure Robinson, Esq: Upon the Surveys for the Louisa Rail Road, Volume 38. T.W. White, 1836.
- Moncure Robinson. Obituary Notice of Henry Seybert. 1883
