= Winterpock, Virginia =

Unincorporated community in Virginia, United States

- Unincorporated community
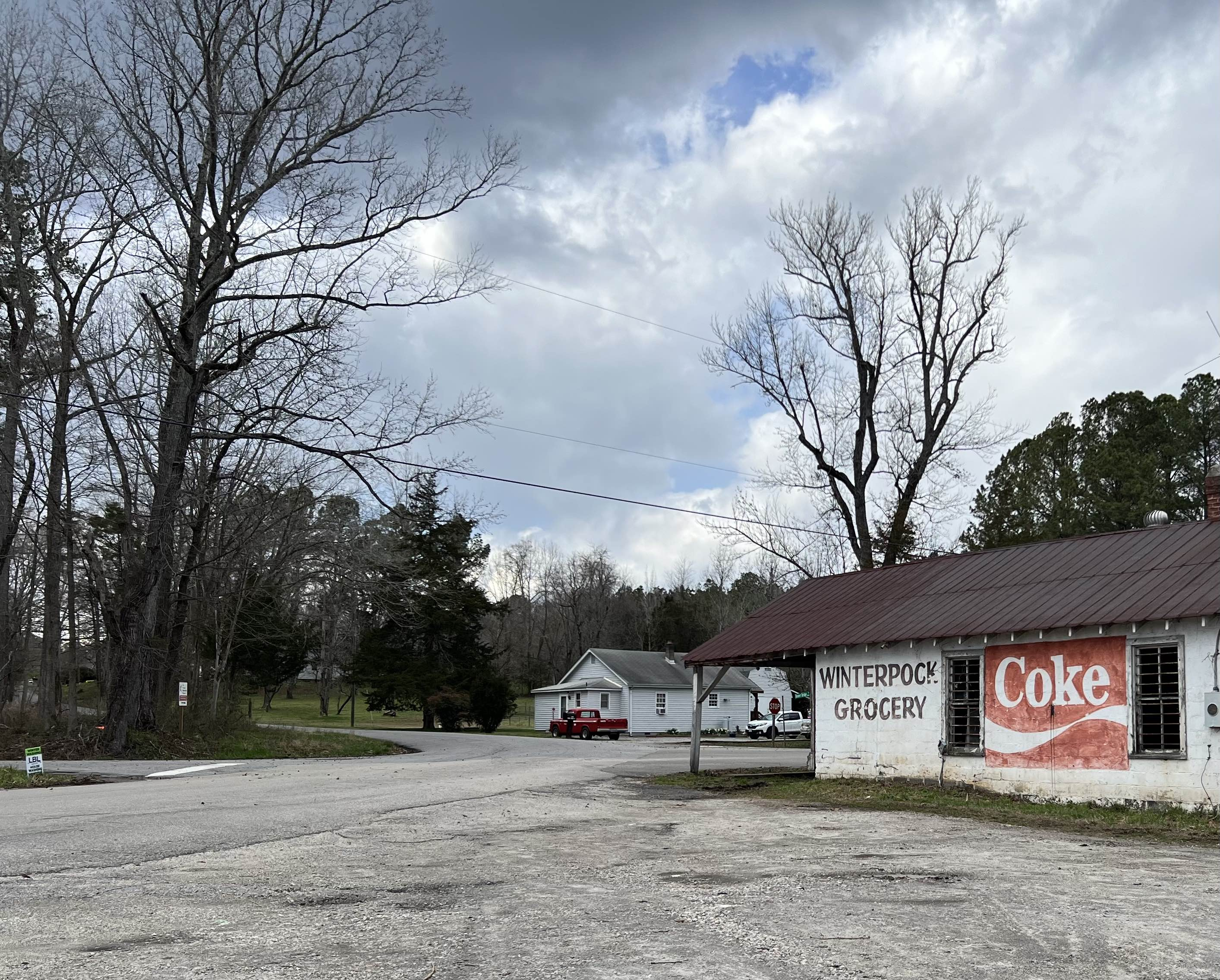
- Center of Winterpock

- Location within the state of Virginia Winterpock (the United States)
- Coordinates: 37°20′46″N 77°43′10″W
- Country: United States
- State: Virginia
- County: Chesterfield
- Elevation: 203 ft (62 m)
- Time zone: UTC−5 (Eastern (EST))
  - Summer (DST): UTC−4 (EDT)
- GNIS feature ID: 1500336

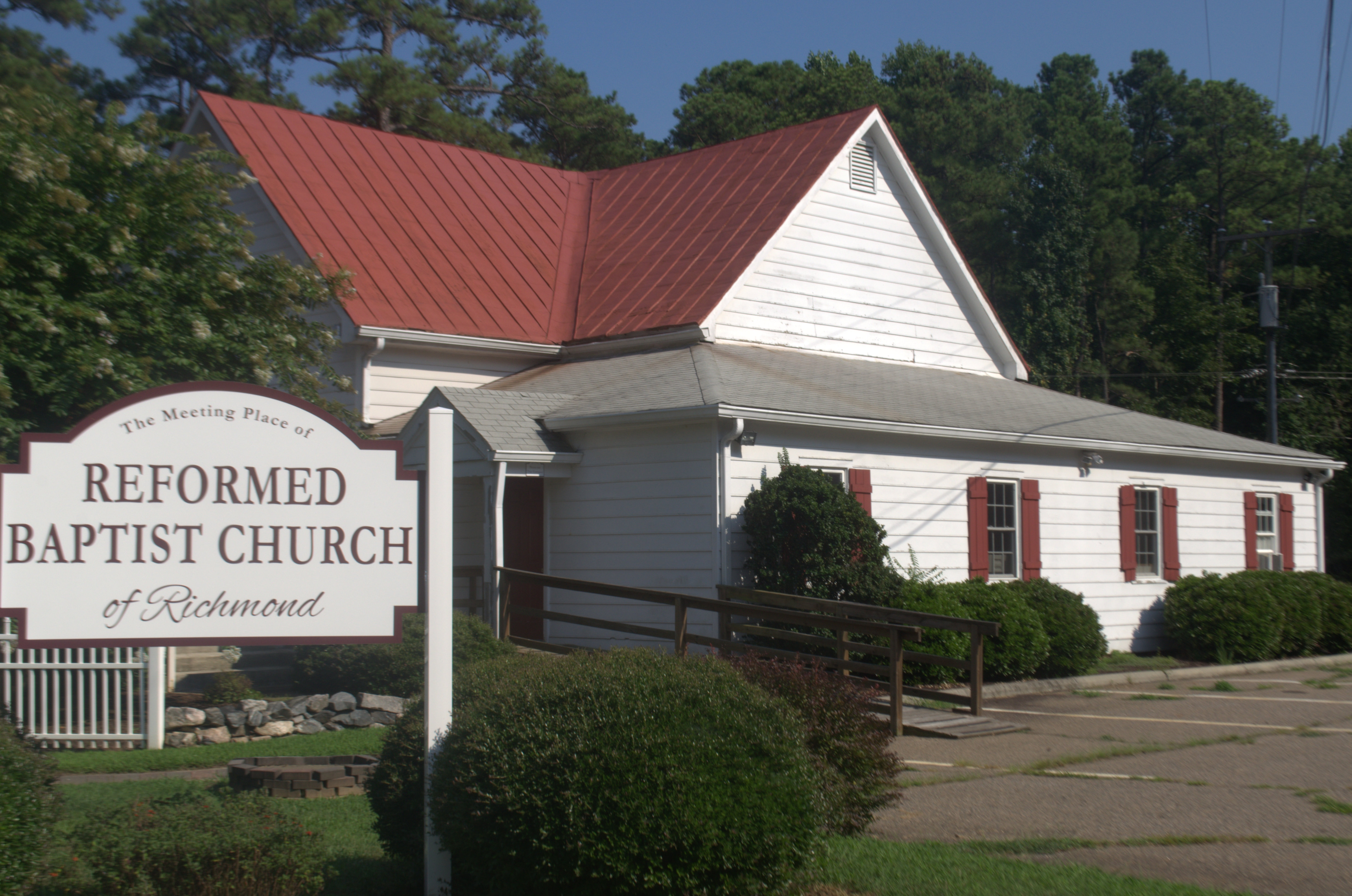
Reformed Baptist Church of Richmond, Est. 1825

Winterpock is an unincorporated community in western Chesterfield County, Virginia, United States. Winterpock does not have its own post office.

== History ==
The Clover Hill Pits were coal mines from 1837 to 1883. Many of the miners lived in this town. Winterpock was named after the old name of the plantation, named after Winterpock Creek, possibly named by Native Americans as "Win-to-poa-ke". Winterpock was the chief mining town. Winterpock, had over 1000 residents in 1870, but as mining dwindled the community of miners became smaller.

All that exists in the town today is the Reformed Baptist Church of Richmond established in 1825 and a store that was opened in 1926 to sell gasoline and food for automobile travelers after the railroad was converted into roads.

Winterpock was the name of the plantation of William Robertson dating from approximately 1680. He had two wives, Christina Ferguson and "Sarah". Offspring: John, William, Arthur(?), James, Robert, and others. John Robertson, b.1710 d.1811, migrated to Fairfield County, SC, to Winnsboro, and married Elizabeth Simpson, offspring William, John and Thomas.

Eppington was listed on the National Register of Historic Places in 1969.
