= Clover Hill Pits =

Coal mines in Virginia, United States

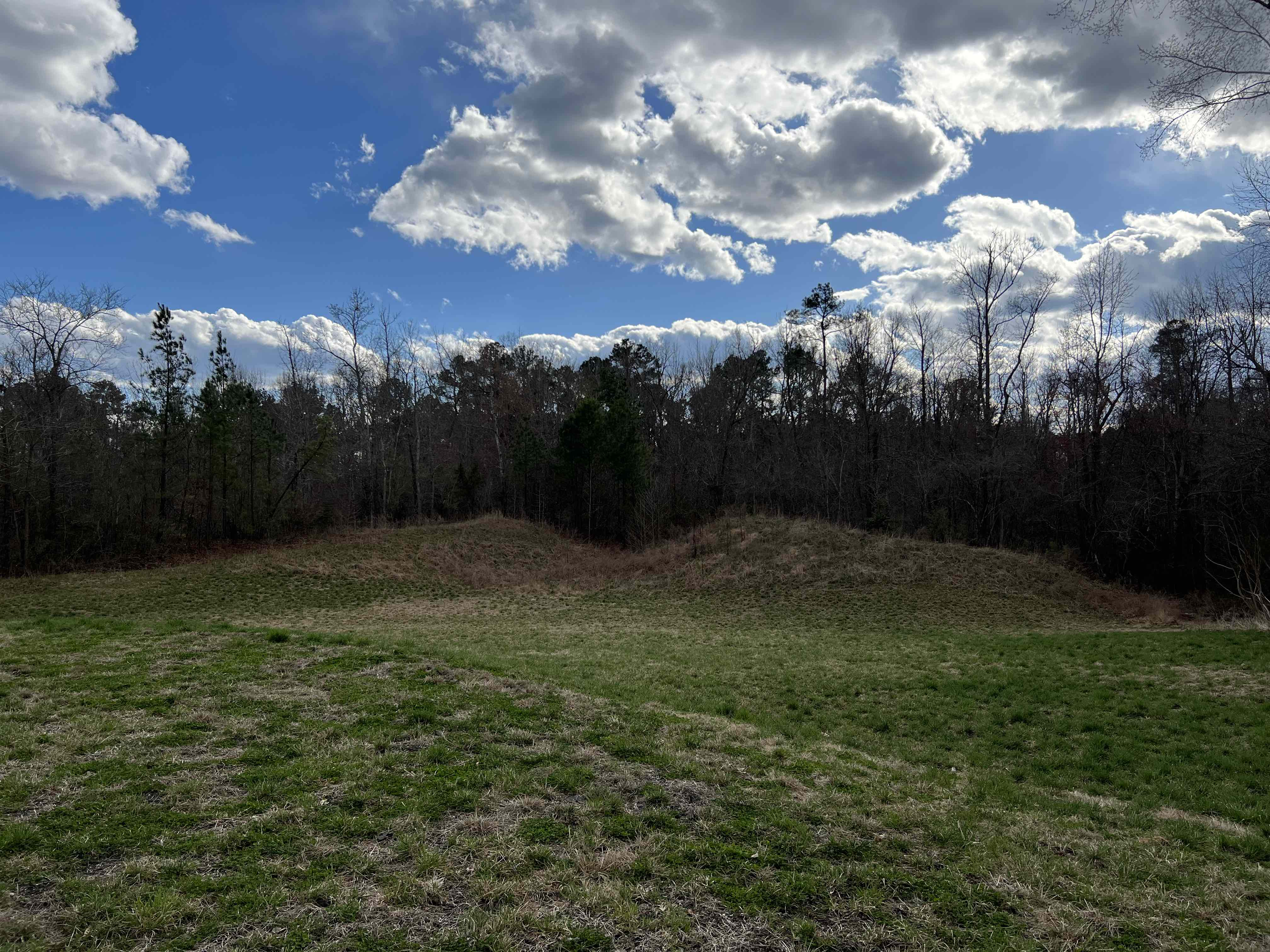
- Area of the former Clover Hill Pits

- Location within the Commonwealth of Virginia
- Location: Winterpock, Virginia, Virginia, United States; 37°20′37″N 077°43′34″W
- Products: Coal
- Financial year: 1841
- Opened: 1837
- Company: Clover Hill Railroad, Brighthope Mining Company

The Clover Hill Pits are a number of coal shafts and mines that operated in the Southside area of Richmond, Virginia, from 1837 until around 1883.

== History ==
In 1837, coal was found after a heavy rain at Clover Hill Plantation, in Chesterfield County, Virginia, possibly by a slave. After mining began, mules carried the coal four miles to Epps Falls on the Appomattox River to be loaded onto boats on the Upper Appomattox Canal Navigation System.

In 1841, the Clover Hill Railroad was created to haul coal from the Clover Hill Pits, to the Osborne Landing Docks and later Bermuda Hundred dock to be transported by barge over the ocean to the Northern States. In 1848 the Clover Hill Railroad had produced 56,000 tons of coal for export and 22,000 tons for use in Richmond and Petersburg. The Clover Hill Pitts had several mining sites, the Brighthope Pit, the Halls pit and Racoon Pit. The company spread outside of Virginia. In 1876, Bituminous Coal from the Clover Hill Railroad Company was advertised in the Coal and Coal Trade Journal from a sales Office in New York.

In 1877 the Brighthope Railway replaced the Clover Hill Railroad. In 1883, 83 employees worked for the Brighthope Mining Company. The mines were declining when the Brighthope Railway was founded.

In 1890, the Norfolk and Western Railway brought in coal from a new coal mine in the Blue Ridge Mountains, the Pocahontas Coalfield which could provide coal more cheaply and ship the coal on a larger standard gauge, class one railroad. This brought an end to the success of the Clover Hill Pits.

== Miners ==
Slave owners leased their African slaves to be miners in the Clover Hill Pits. Slave owners would collect pay for the mining work as part of the lease agreements. Because the slave owner would suffer financial loss at the death of the slave, they purchased insurance policies that would pay the value of the slave to the owner in case of accidental death in the dangerous mines. The mining company also hired whites and hired free people of color.

== Mining town ==
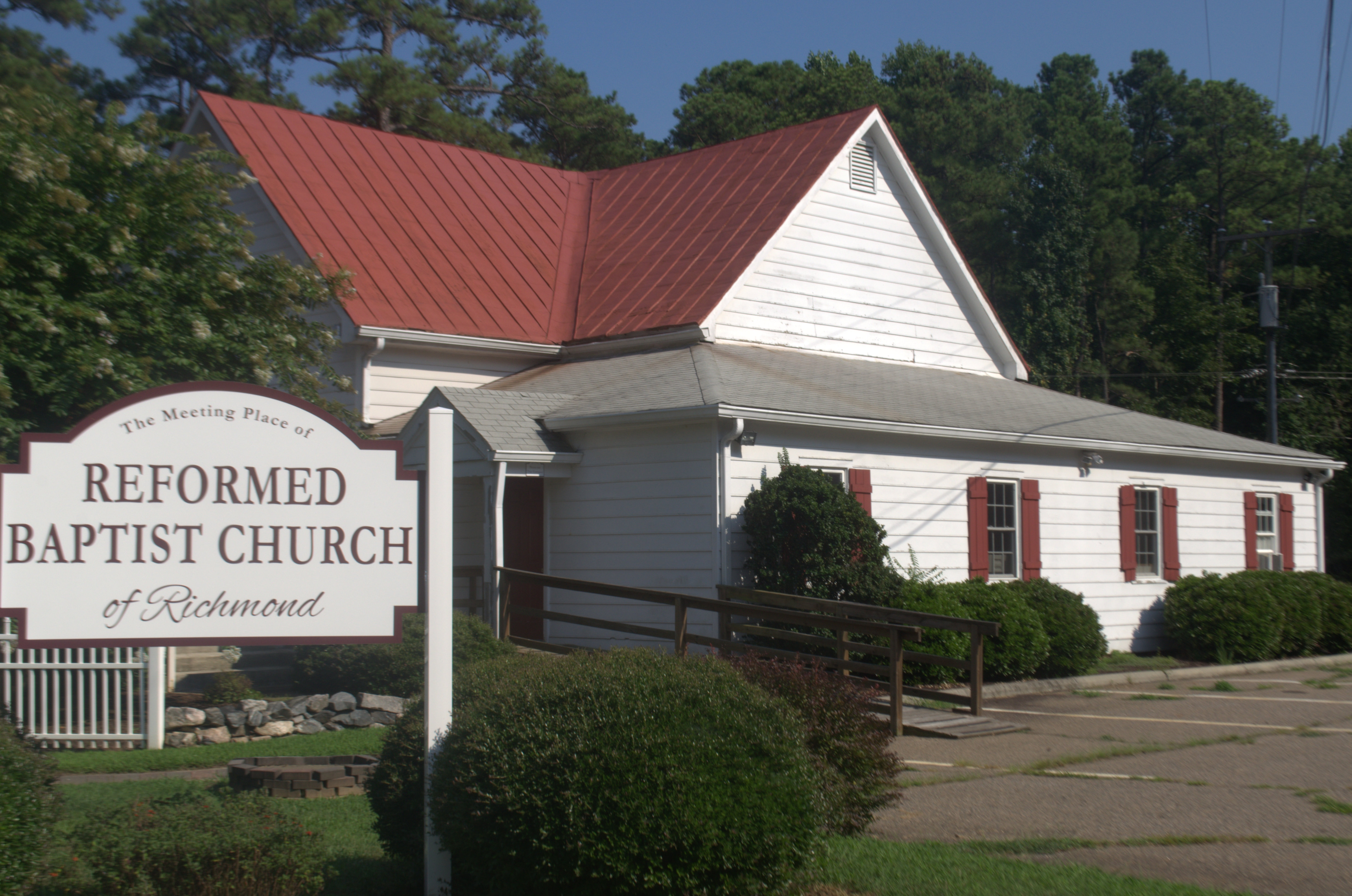
Reformed Baptist Church of Richmond, Est. 1825

Many of the miners lived in a town named Winterpock. Winterpock had over 1000 residents in 1870, but as mining dwindled the community of miners became smaller. All that exists of the town today is the Reformed Baptist Church of Richmond established in 1825 and a store that was opened in 1926 to sell gasoline and food for automobile travelers after the railroad was converted into roads.

== Accidents ==
The mining work was dangerous. In 1867, an explosion closed mine pits temporarily and a cholera epidemic slowed work. Methane explosions killed 17 and then 69 miners in 1859 and 1873 respectively.

=== Nunnally Brothers Accident ===
Two brothers, E. C and William Nunnally, were killed instantly an accident in the mine. The accident occurred at the Clover Hill pits on February 28, 1874. Heavy Timbers that held up the earth above them snapped. The breaking of the timbers caused them to be crushed by the falling earth.

== See also ==
- History of coal mining
