= Farmville =

Farmville may refer to:

== Places ==
=== Canada ===
- Farmville, Nova Scotia, community

=== United States ===
- Farmville, Georgia, unincorporated community
- Farmville, North Carolina, town
  - Farmville Historic District (Farmville, North Carolina)
  - Farmville Plantation
- Farmville, Chatham County, North Carolina, community
- Farmville, Virginia, town
  - Farmville Basin
  - Farmville Historic District (Farmville, Virginia)
  - Farmville station

== Games ==
- FarmVille, an online game

== See also ==
- Farmersville (disambiguation)
- Farmville Historic District (disambiguation)
- Farmville murders in Farmville, Virginia, United States
