= Edwilda Gustava Allen Isaac =

American civil rights pioneer (1937–2022)

- Born: Edwilda Gustava Allen; 1937
- Died: January 21, 2022 (aged 84–85)
- Education: Alverno College
- Occupations: Educator, activist
- Known for: R.R. Moton High School protest

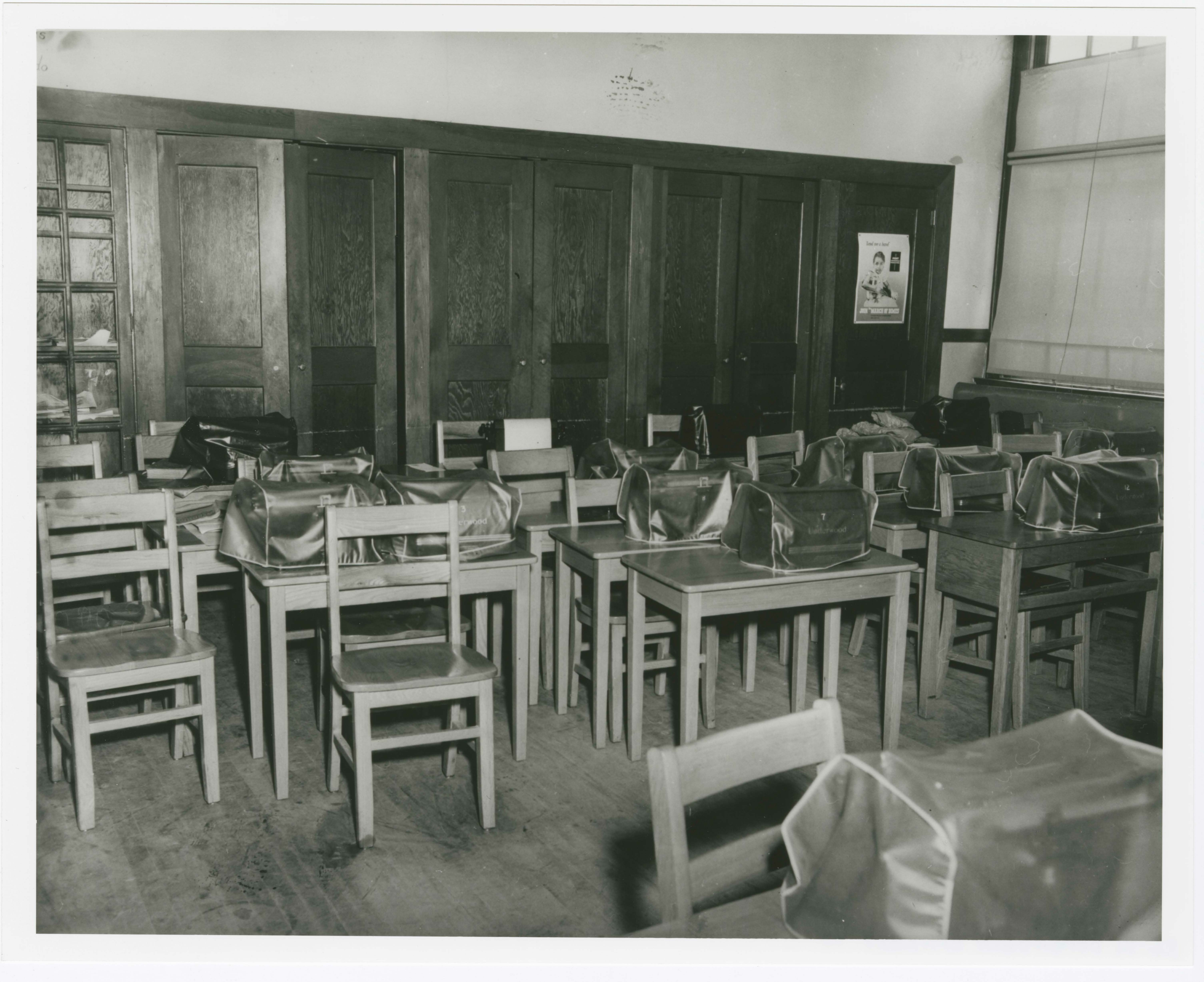
R. R. Moton High School Typing Classroom, 1951 used as Defendant's Exhibit No. 75

Edwilda Gustava Isaac (née Allen; 1937 – 2022) was an American civil rights pioneer. She participated in the 1951 walkout of the segregated Robert Russa Moton High School to protest unequal conditions.

== Biography ==
Edwilda Gustava Allen was born in 1937, the elder daughter of Vera and Edward Allen. As a teenager she attended the Robert Russa Moton High School in Farmville, Virginia. The school, was built in 1939 and by 1951 the segregated, Black school was inadequate to serve the student's needs. Among the problems were overcrowding and outdated textbooks.

In 1951, Isaac, then an eighth grader, helped stage a walkout, led by Barbara Johns, of students to protest conditions. The students marched to the courthouse, and Isaac was a member of the group of students that entered the courthouse to present their grievances.

The walkout brought attention to the situation at the school to the NAACP, this in turn led to the court case Davis v. County School Board of Prince Edward County which in turn became part of Brown v. Board of Education, the Supreme Court case establishing that racial segregation in public schools was unconstitutional.

Isaac went on to attend Alverno College in Milwaukee, Wisconsin, became a music teacher and married. She eventually returned to Farmville where she continued her teaching career. She was a member of the Martha E. Forrester Council of Women. The Council worked to turn the Moton School into a museum and establish the building as a National Historic Landmark.

She died on January 21, 2022. She was survived by two daughters and three grandsons.

In 2016, Isaac was honored by the Virginia Women in History, sponsored by the Library of Virginia and Virginia Foundation for Women.
