= Farmville Historic District =

Farmville Historic District may refer to:

- Farmville Historic District (Farmville, North Carolina), listed on the National Register of Historic Places in Pitt County, North Carolina
- Farmville Plantation, Elmwood, North Carolina, a historic district listed on the NRHP in North Carolina
- Farmville Historic District (Farmville, Virginia), listed on the NRHP in Prince Edward County, Virginia
