= L. Francis Griffin =

American minister and civil rights activist (1917-1980)

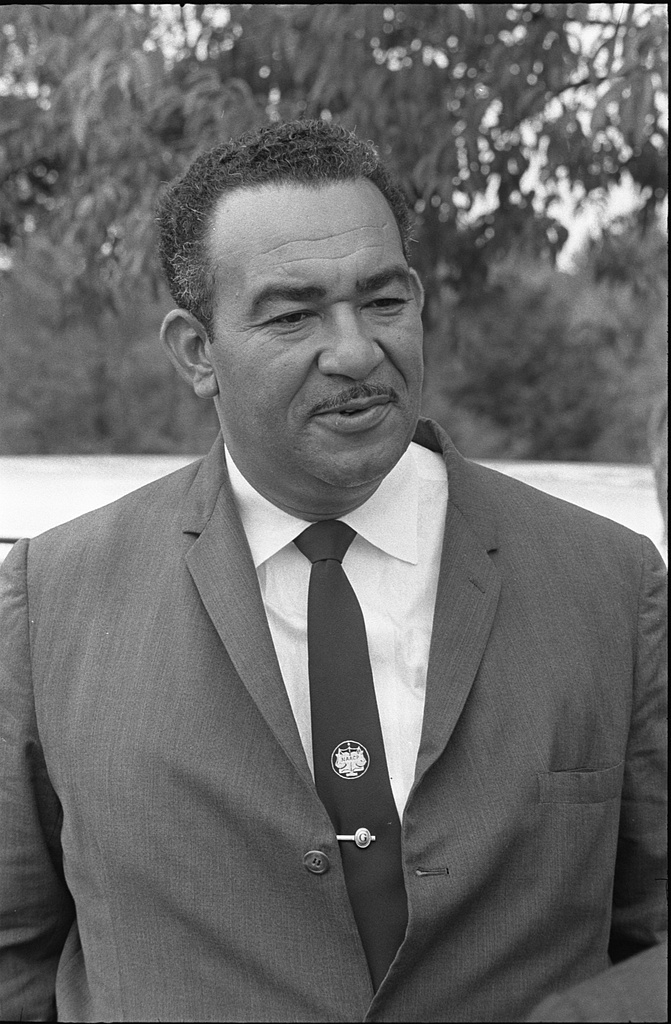
Griffin in 1963

Rev. Leslie Francis Griffin (September 15, 1917 – January 18, 1980) was an American civil rights advocate, and minister. He was nicknamed the "fighting preacher," because of his activism, and served as the pastor at First Baptist Church.

== Biography ==
He was born on September 15, 1917, in Norfolk, Virginia. During World War II (from 1941 until May 1945), Griffin served in the 758th tank battalion in the United States Army. Griffin attended Shaw University's bachelor of divinity program in Raleigh, Virginia.

He moved to Farmville, Virginia, in 1927, to take a job role. Griffin became involved in fighting against segregated and inferior schools for African American children, starting in 1951 during the Robert Russa Moton High School student walk out. He was a leader of Virginia's NAACP. He was the pastor at First Baptist Church in Farmville, Virginia.

Griffin had two daughters who were denied access to Prince Edward County, Virginia's segregated public schools for whites and Griffin sued on their behalf in a case that became part of Brown vs. Board of Education. The daughters lived with white families in California and attended schools there after the county closed its schools rather than integrate.

He died on January 18, 1980, in Farmville. Starting in 1982, Griffin Boulevard in Farmville, Virginia, is named for him. In 2008, the Virginia Civil Rights Memorial was created on the grounds of Capitol Square in Richmond, Virginia which features a sculpture of him. In 2015, the L. Francis Griffin Sr. Gymnasium was dedicated to him at the Prince Edward County Middle School in Farmville.
