= First Baptist Church (Farmville, Virginia) =

Historic church in Virginia, US

- U.S. National Register of Historic Places
- U.S. Historic district – Contributing property
- Virginia Landmarks Register
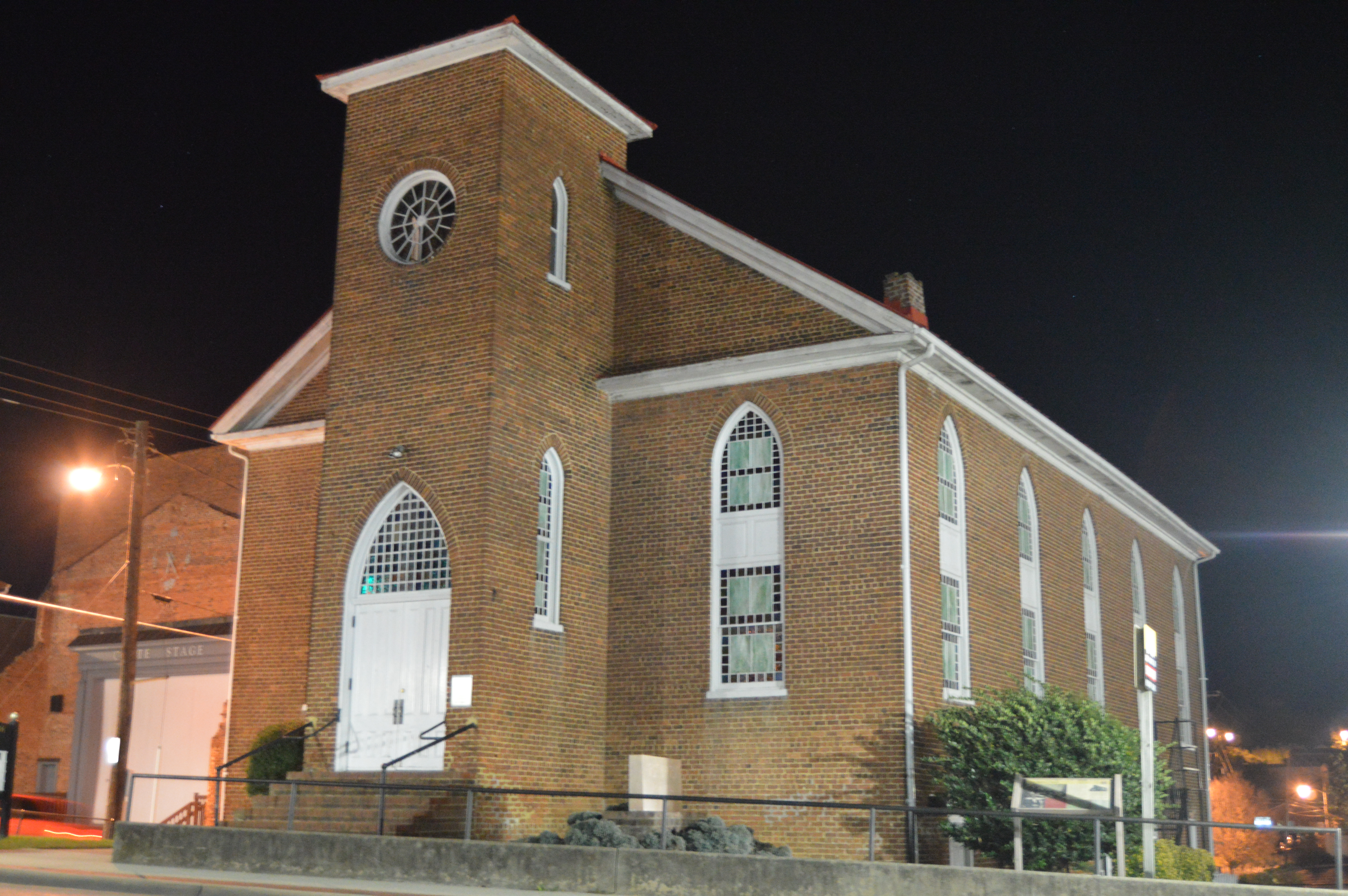
- Front and southern side of the church

- Location within Virginia Location within the United States
- Location: 100 S. Main St., Farmville, Virginia
- Coordinates: 37°18′3″N 78°23′18″W
- Area: .262 acres (0.106 ha)
- Built: c. 1855-1895
- Architectural style: Late Gothic Revival
- NRHP reference No.: 13000046
- VLR No.: 144-0027-0167

Significant dates
- Added to NRHP: February 27, 2013
- Designated VLR: December 13, 2012

First Baptist Church is a historic African-American Baptist church located at Farmville, Prince Edward County, Virginia. It was built between about 1855 an 1895, and is a one-story, rectangular brick Late Gothic Revival style church building on a full basement. The building features a square tower centered on the primary façade, pointed arch windows with stained- and milk-glass panes, a primary entry with double leaf doors topped by a pointed arch transom and, on the interior, original wood pews and beaded board wainscoting. The church was the site of a number of meetings related to the desegregation of Prince Edward County schools during the 1950s and 1960s.

It was listed on the National Register of Historic Places in 2013. It is located in the Farmville Historic District.

== See also ==
- Robert Russa Moton Museum
- Davis v. County School Board of Prince Edward County
- Griffin v. County School Board of Prince Edward County
