= Senator Griggs =

Senator Griggs may refer to:

- Chauncey Wright Griggs (1832–1910), Minnesota State Senate
- John W. Griggs (1849–1927), New Jersey State Senate
- Nathaniel M. Griggs (1857–1919), Virginia State Senate
- Ron Griggs (born 1952), New Mexico State Senate
