= Virginia Civil Rights Memorial =

- Interactive map of Virginia Civil Rights Memorial
- Location: Virginia State Capitol
- Coordinates: 37°32′19.7″N 77°26′1″W

The Virginia Civil Rights Memorial is a monument in Richmond, Virginia, commemorating protests which helped bring about school desegregation in the state. The memorial was opened in July 2008, and is located on the grounds of the Virginia State Capitol. It features eighteen statues of leaders or participants in the Civil Rights Movement on four sides of a rectangular granite stone block onto which are carved quotes. The memorial was designed by Stanley Bleifeld, who was chosen by the commission behind the construction of the monument. The memorial cost $2.8 million which was financed by private donations.

== Background ==
R. R. Moton High School, an all-black high school in Farmville, Virginia, founded in 1923, suffered from terrible conditions due to underfunding. The school did not have a gymnasium, cafeteria or teachers' restrooms. Teachers and students did not have desks or blackboards, and due to overcrowding, some students had to take classes in an immobilized, decrepit school bus parked outside the main school building. The school's requests for additional funds were denied by the all-white school board.

In response, on April 23, 1951, a 16-year-old student named Barbara Rose Johns covertly organized a student general strike. She forged notes to teachers telling them to bring their students to the auditorium for a special announcement. When the school's students showed up, Johns took the stage and persuaded the school to strike to protest poor school conditions. Over 450 walked out and marched to the homes of members of the school board, who refused to see them. Thus began a two-week protest.

The protest led to a court case where Virginia civil rights lawyers Oliver Hill and Spottswood Robinson brought suit against the school board. Davis v. County School Board of Prince Edward County was eventually one of the four cases combined into Brown v. Board of Education, the famous case in which the U.S. Supreme Court, in 1954, officially overturned racial segregation in U.S. public schools. However the policies of Massive Resistance delayed integration until the 1960s when national legislation was passed.

== Construction ==
Governor of Virginia Mark Warner and the Virginia General Assembly established on February 24, 2005, the commission to oversee the monument. Ground was broken on the site of the monument on February 19, 2008. The memorial is located on a corner opposite a Statue of Harry F. Byrd, the architect of the massive resistance movement against civil rights. The monument was on temporary display in Newburgh, New York before being installed in July 2008. The ceremony opening the memorial was held on July 21, 2008, and was attended by about 4,000, including Governor Tim Kaine, relatives of those involved in the protest, and civil rights leaders. Stanley Bleifeld, who was the sculptor of the monument, said that because of the continuing nature of the Civil Rights Movement, he "wanted to make a living memorial, not a statue so that people engage and understand what's behind it."

== Statues ==
Eighteen statues are positioned around the monument. Not every statue depicts a specific person, with statues representing both students and adults. Among those depicted include:

- Barbara Rose Johns
- Spottswood William Robinson III
- Oliver Hill
- Leslie Francis Griffin

== Quotes ==
Two quotes are engraved on the granite on each of the long sides of the monument:

- "It seemed like reaching for the moon." — Barbara Rose Johns
- "The legal system can force open doors and sometimes even knock down walls, but it cannot build bridges. That job belongs to you and me." — Thurgood Marshall

== See also ==
- Civil rights movement in popular culture
