= Barbara Rose Johns =

American civil rights activist (1935–1991)

- Johns in a high school graduation photo (1952)
- Born: March 6, 1935; New York City, New York, U.S.
- Died: September 28, 1991 (aged 56); Philadelphia, Pennsylvania, U.S.
- Occupations: Civil rights activist, librarian
- Known for: Davis v. County School Board of Prince Edward County; R.R. Moton High School protest
- Spouse: William Powell
- Children: 5

Barbara Rose Johns Powell (March 6, 1935 – September 28, 1991) was a leader in the American civil rights movement. On April 23, 1951, at the age of 16, Powell led a student strike for equal education opportunities at R.R. Moton High School in Farmville, Virginia. After securing NAACP legal support, the Moton students filed Davis v. Prince Edward County, the only student-initiated case consolidated into Brown v. Board of Education, the landmark 1954 U.S. Supreme Court decision declaring "separate but equal" public schools unconstitutional.

== Early life ==
Barbara Rose Johns Powell was born in New York City in 1935. Her family had roots in Prince Edward County, Virginia, where they returned to live. Her mother worked in Washington D.C. for the U.S. Navy, and her father operated the farm where the family resided. The eldest of five children, Powell had a younger sister, Joan Johns Cobbs, and three younger brothers: Ernest; Roderick, who served in Vietnam as a dog handler and was awarded the Bronze Star and Purple Heart; and Robert.

Powell's uncle was Vernon Johns, an outspoken activist for civil rights. When he visited Powell and her family, he would ask the children questions about black history. This motivated Powell and her siblings to study black history, and Powell, as well as her siblings, was influenced by Vernon and his outspoken nature.

== Moton High School ==
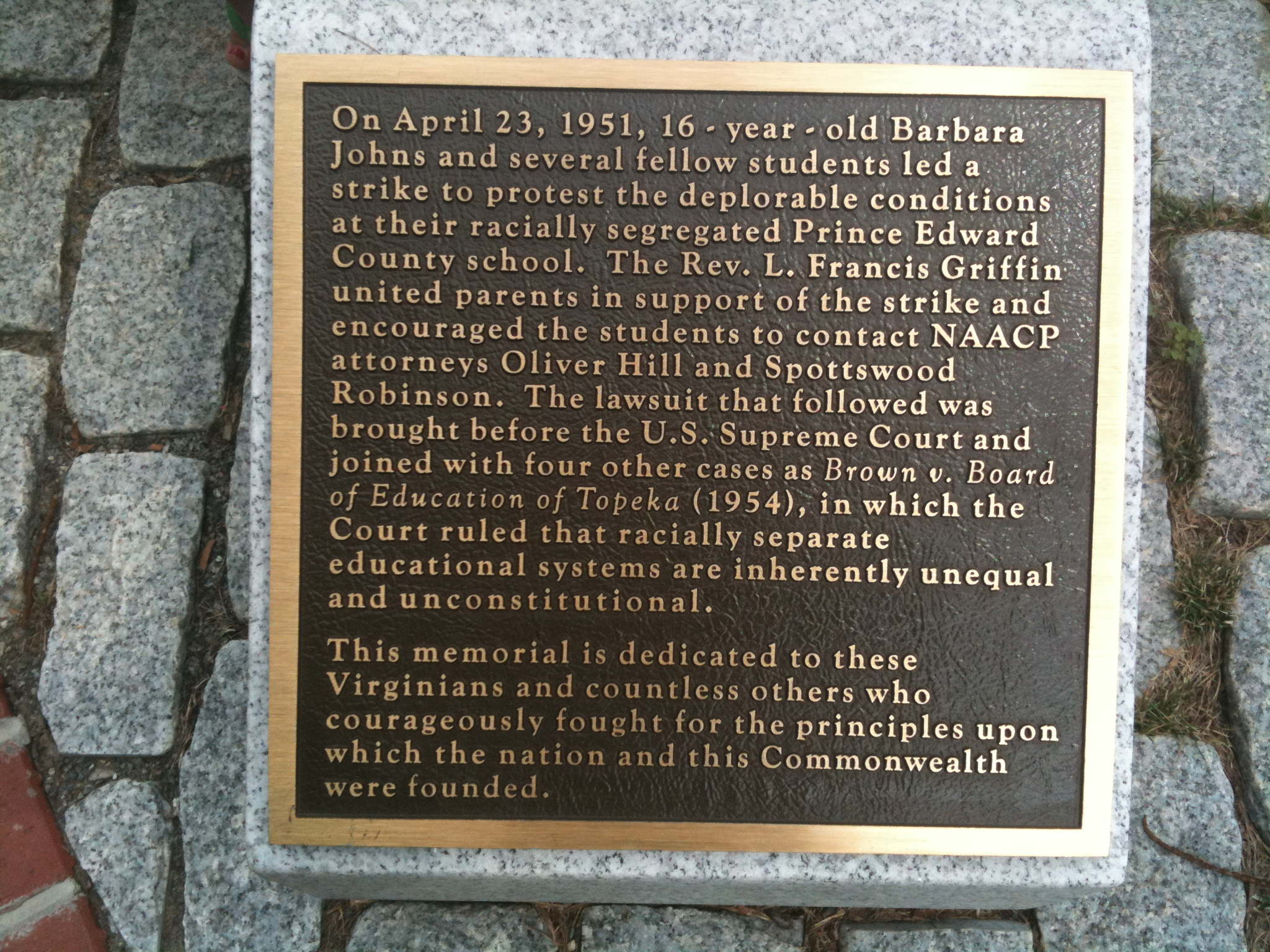
Plaque on Virginia Capitol Grounds commemorating Barbara Johns' initiative in integrating Virginia schools

While living in Prince Edward County, Powell was educated in segregated public schools. In 1951, 16-year-old Powell was a junior at the all-Black Moton High School in Farmville. Across town was another school, open exclusively to white students. The resources available to each school, and the quality of the facilities, were unequal. Powell's school was designed and built to hold roughly 200 students, though by 1951 enrollment was twice that number. According to a first-person account from Powell's sister Joan:

In winter the school was very cold. And a lot of times we had to put on our jackets. Now, the students that sat closest to the wood stove were very warm and the ones who sat farthest away were very cold. And I remember being cold a lot of times and sitting in the classroom with my jacket on. When it rained, we would get water through the ceiling. So there were lots of pails sitting around the classroom. And sometimes we had to raise our umbrellas to keep the water off our heads. It was a very difficult setting for trying to learn.

Parents of the black students appealed to the all-white school board to provide a larger and properly equipped facility. As a stopgap measure, the board erected several tar paper shacks to handle the overflow of students. Powell was frustrated and decided to take action after missing her school bus and watching a bus for the white students pass her. She approached a teacher to voice her concerns and the teacher prompted her to take action.

== Organizing the strike and filing suit ==
Barbara Johns met with several classmates and they all agreed to help organize a student strike. On April 23, 1951, the plan Barbara Johns initiated was put into action. The principal of the school was tricked into leaving by being told that some students were downtown causing trouble. While the principal was away, Barbara Johns forged a memo from that principal telling the teachers to bring their classes to a special assembly. The teachers brought their classes and left the assembly per request. She then delivered a speech to all 450 students, revealing her plans for a student strike in protest of the unequal conditions of the black and white schools. The students agreed to participate, and on that day they marched down to the county courthouse to make officials aware of the large difference in quality between the white and black schools. The student leaders went in the office of School Superintendent T. J. McIlwaine who told them they were out of place. Johns had hoped that the strike would end with the county officials sympathizing with the students and building them a new school, but was instead met with indifference and struggle. For the remainder of the day, students picketed the school, both inside and outside, with placards proclaiming, "We want a new school or none at all" and "Down with tar-paper shacks."

On April 25, 1951, Oliver W. Hill and Spottswood Robinson, lawyers for the NAACP (National Association for the Advancement of Colored People), arrived in Prince Edward County to help the students of Robert Russa Moton High School, who had gone on strike. While the strike was being carried out, Barbara Johns and other fellow student leaders sought legal counsel from the NAACP. The NAACP agreed to assist as long as the suit would be for an integrated school system, and not just equal facilities. A month later, the NAACP filed Davis v. County School Board of Prince Edward County in federal court. The court upheld segregation in Prince Edward County, and the NAACP appealed to the U.S. Supreme Court. Davis v. Prince Edward County, along with four other cases, became part of the case Brown v. Board of Education. As Davis was the only case in Brown initiated by student protest, it is seen by some as the beginning of the Civil Rights Movement.

== After the strike ==
For her part in the integration movement, Johns was harassed and the Ku Klux Klan burned a cross in her yard. Fearing for her safety, her parents sent her to Montgomery, Alabama to live with her uncle. After the strike, Barbara Johns lived out the rest of her life in relative peace. She received a degree in library science from Drexel University. She married William Powell, raised five children and lived in Philadelphia. Her commitment to education moved her to become a librarian for the Philadelphia school system. She served in this profession until her death from bone cancer in 1991.

== Legacy and honors ==
Barbara Johns' contribution to civil rights is often overlooked because she was a teenager when she made a difference. In the Pulitzer Prize-winning Parting the Waters: America in the King Years, 1954–63, the author Taylor Branch remarks upon Davis v. Prince Edward:

The case remained muffled in white consciousness, and the schoolchild origins of the lawsuit were lost as well on nearly all Negroes outside Prince Edward County. ... The idea that non-adults of any race might play a leading role in political events had simply failed to register on anyone — except perhaps the Klansmen who burned a cross in the Johns' yard one night, and even then people thought their target might not have been Barbara but her notorious firebrand uncle.

The Virginia Civil Rights Memorial was opened in 2008, with Barbara Johns and several other students prominently featured on one side with the quote "It seemed like reaching for the Moon." The Library of Virginia also honored Barbara Johns Powell in 2005 by naming her one of their Virginia Women in History.

Barbara Johns is now studied in the Virginia elementary school history curriculum, in the fourth grade unit on the Civil Rights and Massive Resistance.

In 2010, Virginia artist Louis Briel completed a portrait of Johns, which hung in the state Capitol building before being permanently installed in the Robert Russa Moton Museum in Farmville. The portrait is on loan for display in Virginia's Executive Mansion following a request by Governor McAuliffe and First Lady Dorothy McAuliffe.

In 2017, Governor Terry McAuliffe officially named the Office of the Attorney General after Powell, for her impact on the civil rights movement.

On August 17, 2017, in an interview with CBS This Morning, Governor Terry McAuliffe spoke about the Unite the Right rally in Charlottesville, Virginia, with a portrait of Barbara Johns in the background. He called the white supremacists cowards and said:

Over my shoulder is Barbara Johns who at 16 years old led the revolt at Prince Edward County, Virginia, when we had white schools and black schools. And she said "Our schools are inferior." And she led a revolt of 400 students in the '50s. That is what we need as leaders.

In 2017, Fairfax County, Virginia, considered renaming its J.E.B. Stuart High School after Barbara Johns. On September 7, 2018, J.E.B. Stuart High School was rededicated as Justice High School in honor of Johns, Justice Thurgood Marshall and Col. Louis G Mendez Jr., among others who have worked to advance justice.

In May 2019, Johns was featured in the New York Times series "Overlooked No More". The editors of the series are adding obituaries of remarkable but overlooked people who did not have obituaries in the New York Times at the time of their deaths.

In 2020, Longwood University in Farmville renamed a newly renovated residence hall Johns Hall, formerly Curry.

In 2020, Johns was inducted into the National Women's Hall of Fame.

On December 16, 2020, Virginia's Commission on Historical Statues in the United States Capitol voted to recommend that a statue of Barbara Rose Johns represent the state of Virginia alongside the statue of George Washington in the National Statuary Hall Collection, in the U.S. Capitol, replacing the statue of Robert E. Lee. On December 16, 2025, exactly five years after the vote by the Commission, the statue of Johns was unveiled in the U.S. Capitol, and replaced the statue of the Confederate general and slaveholder, Robert Lee.

== See also ==
- Claudette Colvin
