= Martha E. Forrester =

African-American civil rights activist

- Born: 1863
- Died: 1951 (aged 87–88)
- Occupations: Clubwoman, activist, educator

Martha E. Forrester (1863–1951) was an African-American civil rights activist.

Forrester was born in Richmond, Virginia, and married Robert Forrester early in life; she worked as a public school teacher in Richmond for some years. After her husband's death she moved to Farmville, where her daughter Jeannette Clark lived. There she was among a group of retired educators who established the Council of Colored Women in 1920. She served as president of that body for 31 years, working throughout her time in the position to develop better educational opportunities for black students in Prince Edward County. Among her accomplishments was the establishment of a longer school year and better accessibility to higher-level classes. She was also instrumental in the creation of the county's first black high school, erected in 1939 and named for Robert Russa Moton. The Council of Colored Women was later renamed the Martha E. Forrester Council in her honor.

Forrester's house in Farmville has been recognized by a historic marker approved by the Virginia Department of Historic Resources in March 2017 and erected later that year.
