= Leucogranite =

Granitic rock

- Igneous rock
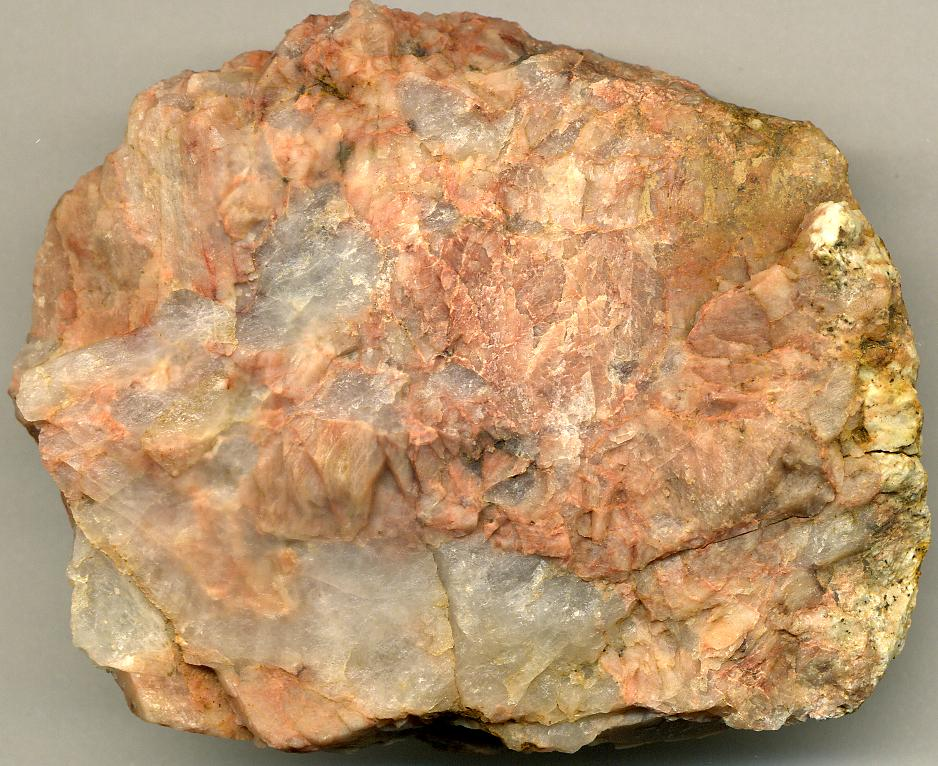
- Leucogranite (alaskite) from Colorado, USA, containing potassium feldspar and quartz

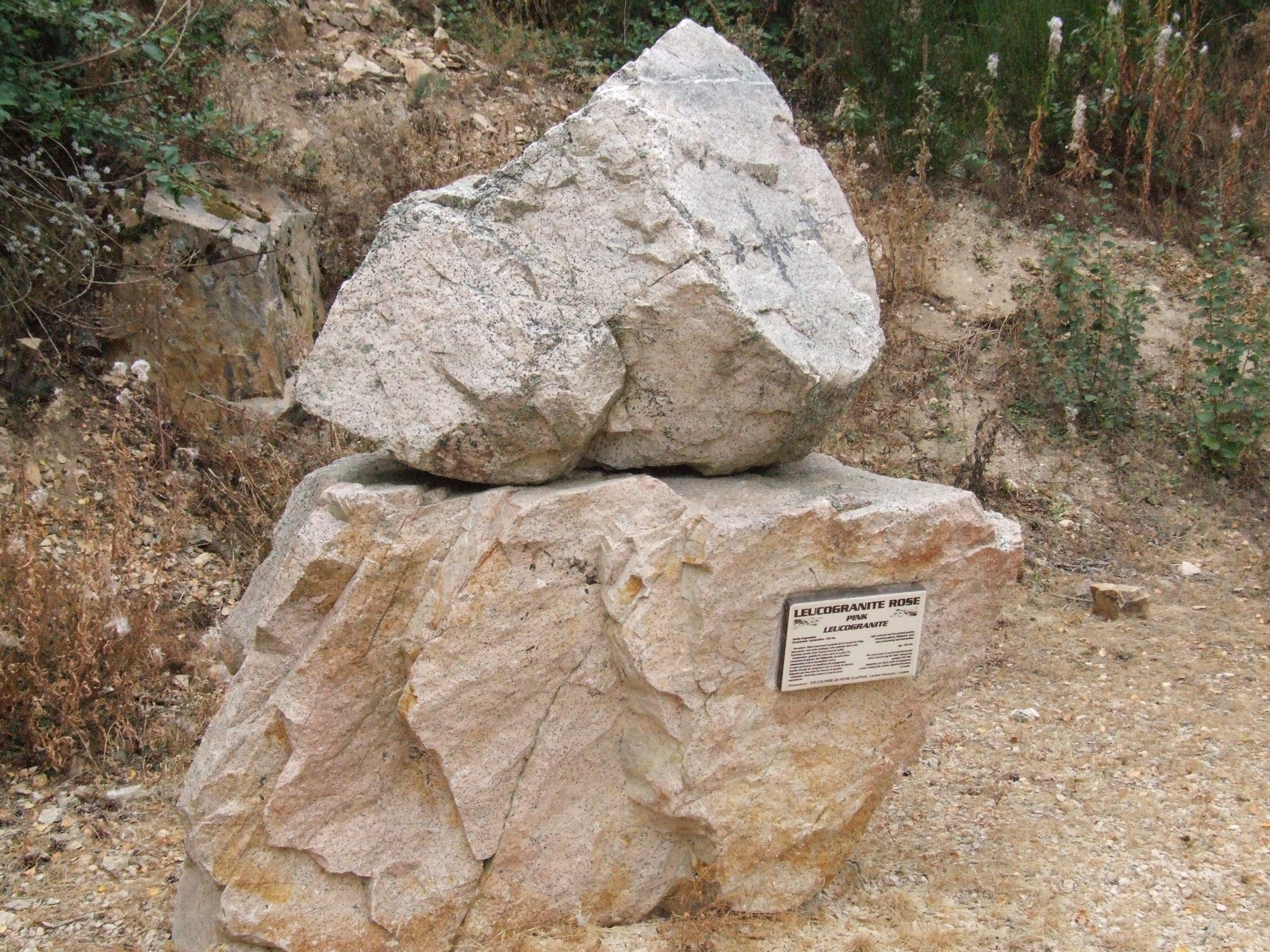
Leucogranite from Lozère, France

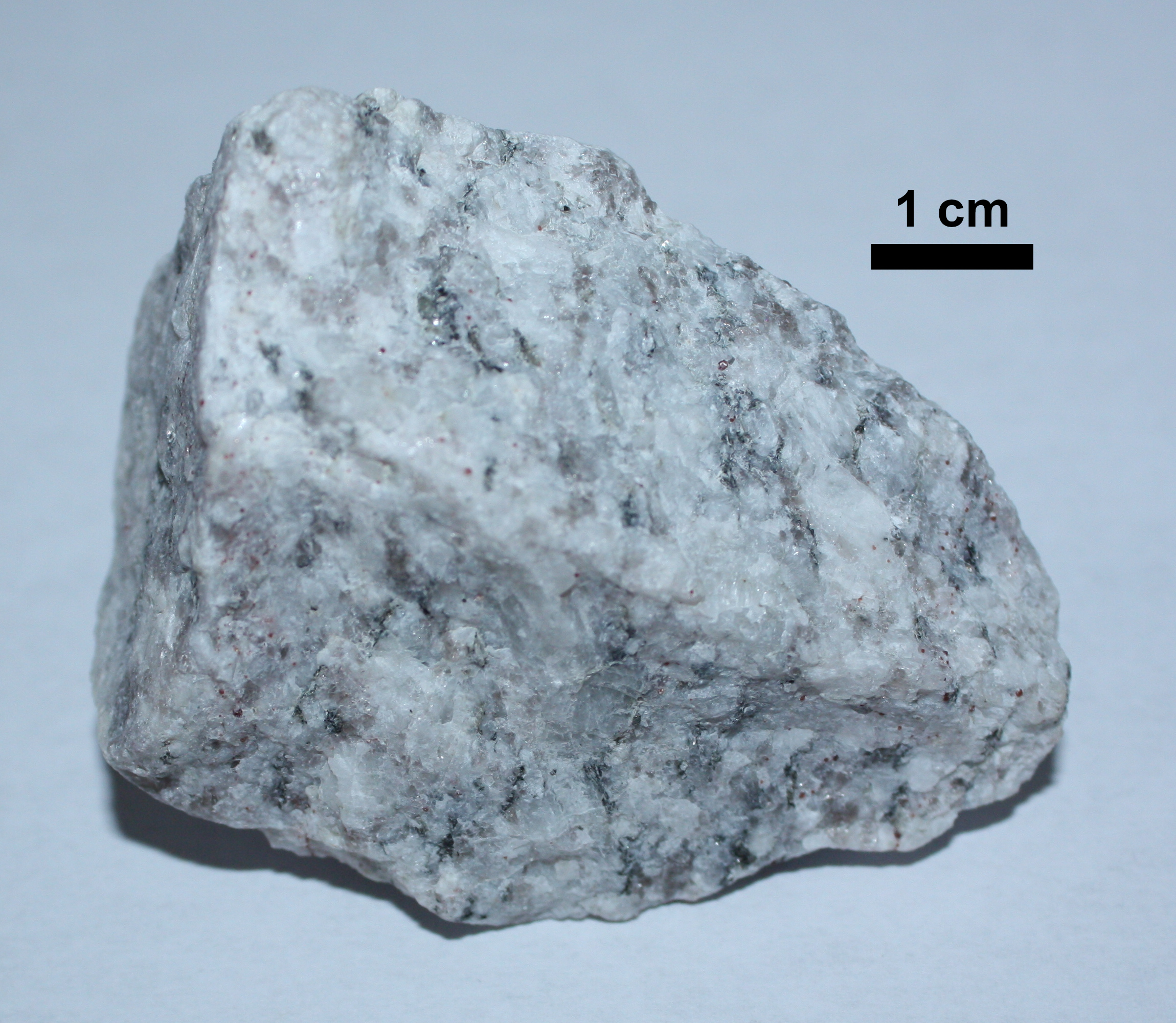
Leucogranite of the Boscobel complex, Virginia

Leucogranite is a light-colored, granitic, igneous rock containing almost no dark minerals.

Leucogranites have been reported from a variety of orogenies involving continental collisions. Examples include the Black Hills (Trans-Hudson orogeny of Proterozoic age), the Blue Ridge basement complex (Grenville orogeny of Proterozoic age), the Paleozoic Appalachian orogeny in Maine, and the currently active Himalayan orogeny. The leucogranite magmas are interpreted to have been derived by partial melting of pelitic rocks in the upper portions of thickened crust. These melts result following deformation and metamorphism, but the heat source is uncertain. Shear-heating associated with large shear zones in the crust has been proposed as the mechanism.

Mont Saint-Michel in Normandy, France is made of leucogranite, which solidified from an underground intrusion of molten magma about 525 million years ago during the Cambrian period.

A study of sodium-rich quartz-alkali feldspar—biotite gneiss granulite facies terrane in the Kerala Khondalite Belt near Manali in south India found that in situ leucosomes (light colored segregations) within the gneiss showed the development of garnet replacing the dark biotite. The study indicated localized melting or migmatization within the gneiss. This was followed by intrusion of the gneiss by garnet-bearing leucogranitic melts. Strontium isotope ratios of the leucogranite intrusives are distinct from that of the gneiss and associated leucosomes. This indicates the leucogranite melts were not derived from the local gneiss, however the gneiss is isotopically variable and the leucogranite could have derived from subjacent gneiss.

Alaskite is leucocratic alkali feldspar granite.
