= Boscobel complex =

- Stratigraphic range: Paleozoic
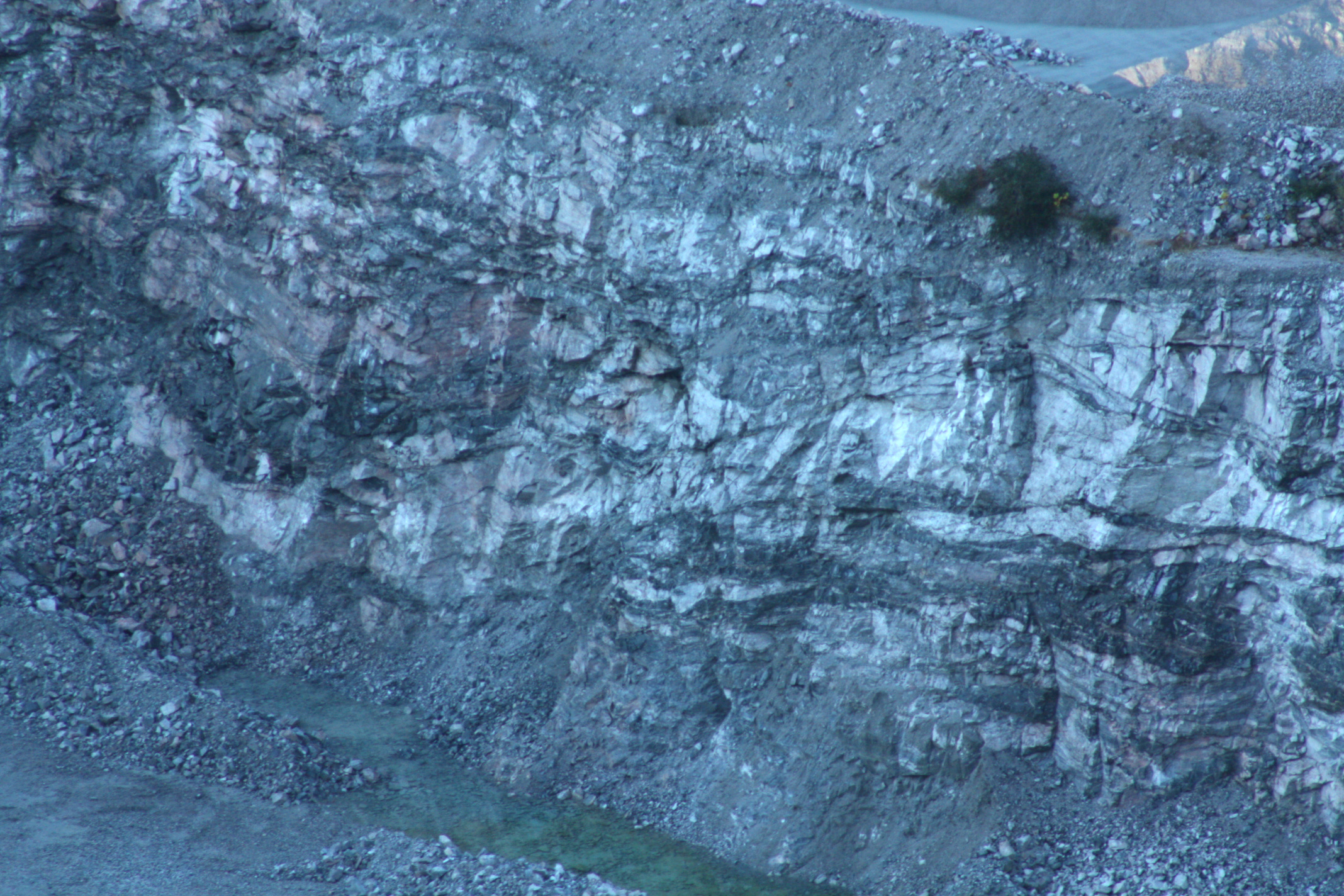
- Bottom of Luck Stone Quarry showing interfingering of gray gneiss and white leucogranite
- Type: metamorphic and igneous

Lithology
- Primary: granite
- Other: gneiss

Location
- Region: Virginia
- Country: United States

Type section
- Named for: Boscabel Ferry
- Named by: Shaler and Woodworth, 1899

The Boscobel complex (originally "Boscabel bowlder beds") is unit of interlayered granite and gneiss within Goochland and Powhatan Counties, Virginia. The area had been mapped as the Petersburg Granite in 1970 by B. K. Goodwin.

The complex is mapped in a single, fault-bound area (horst) approximately 9 km long. It lies on the west side of the Richmond Basin, a Mesozoic rift basin, and on the east margin of the Goochland Terrane, a section of the Piedmont of Virginia that is tectonically distinct from the surrounding rocks. It is quarried for aggregate at the Boscobel Plant of the Luck Stone Corporation, near Manakin.

== Description ==
The Boscobel complex's consists of two interfingered lithologies, a two-mica gneiss and a leucogranite. The gneiss is foliated and quartzofeldspathic with quartz, plagioclase, muscovite, biotite, and chlorite, with some alkali feldspar. The leucogranite is primarily quartz and feldspar with some garnet.

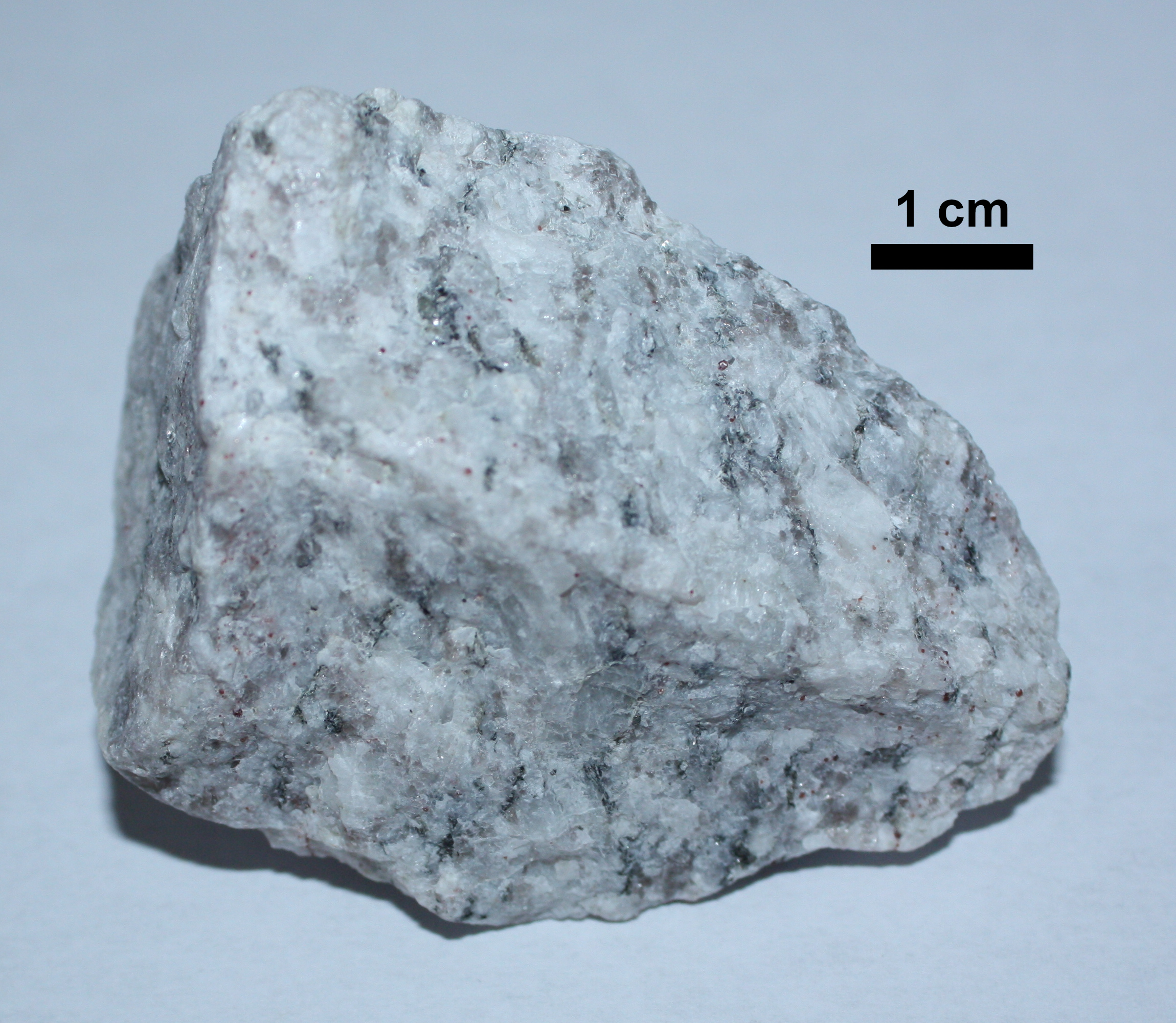
Sample of the leucogranite

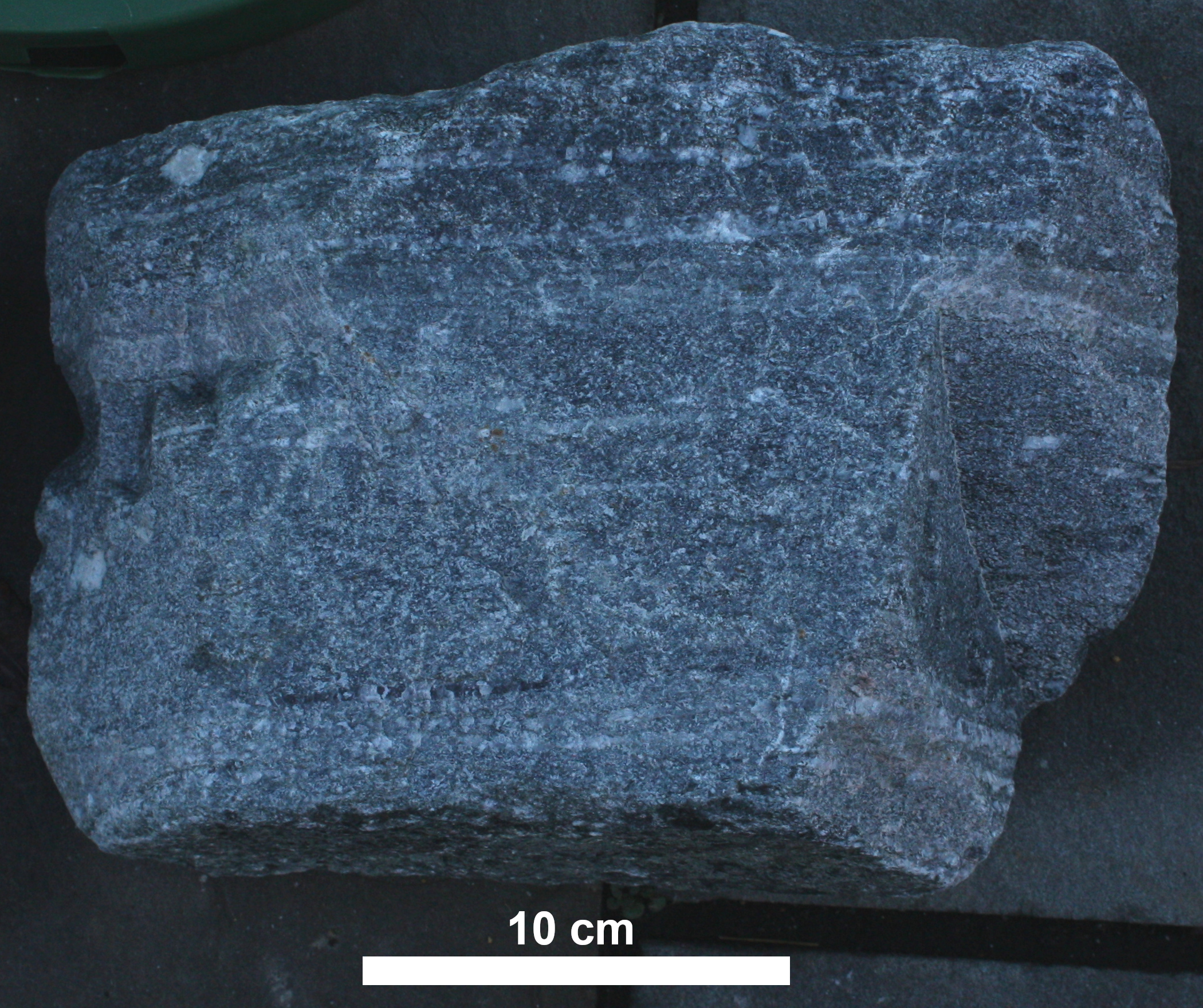
Gneiss sample

== Exposures ==
The type section, originally called the "Boscabel bowlder beds" when the extent of the horst was unknown, was named from exposures at a Boscabel Ferry on the James River near Manakin.

The largest exposure is the quarry pit of the Boscobel Plant of the Luck Stone Corporation, near the type section. An overlook above the quarry is available to the public.

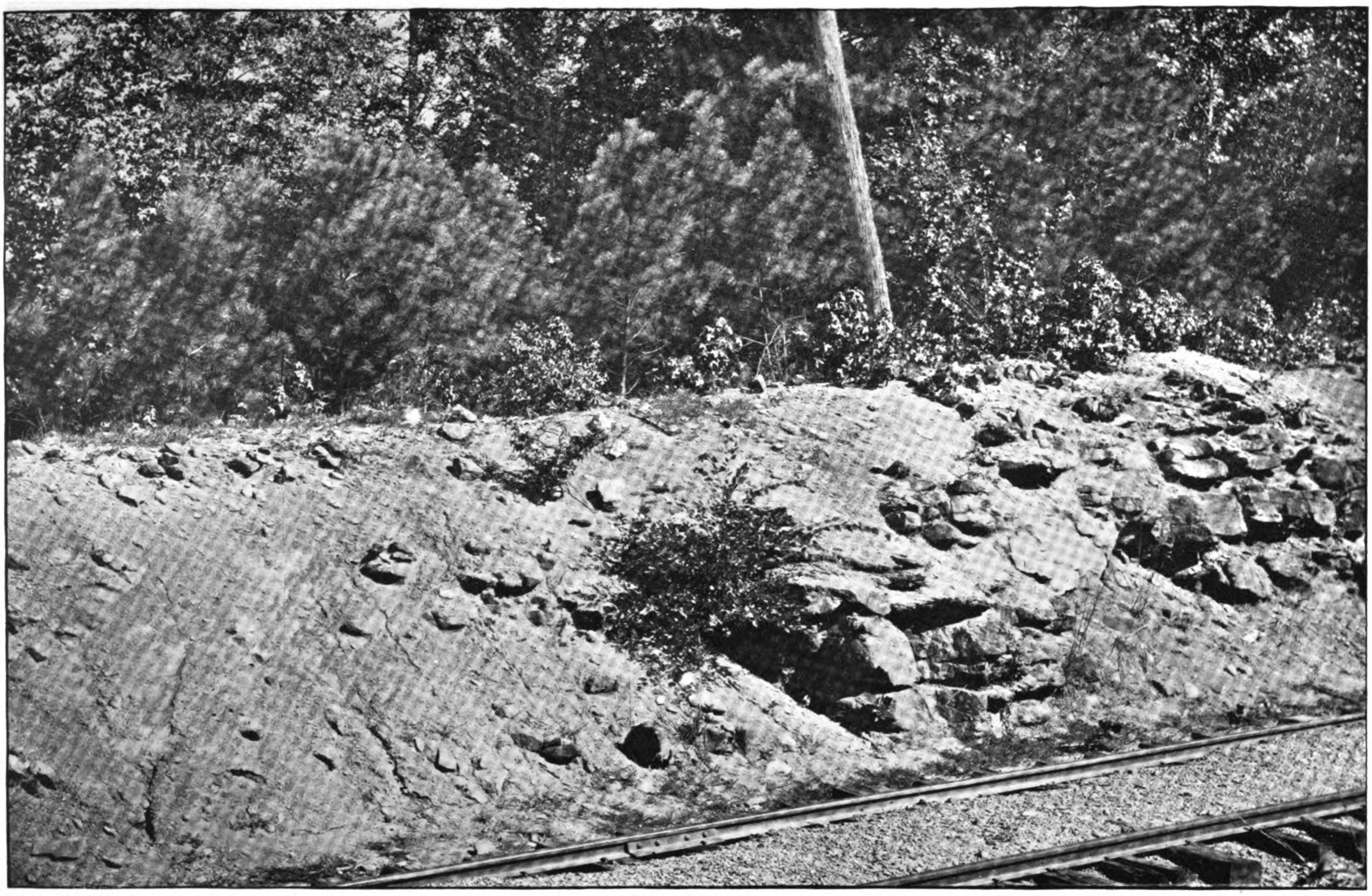
1899 photograph of the type section along the Southern Railway
