= Farmersville =

Farmersville may refer to several places in the United States:

- Farmersville, California
- Farmersville, Georgia
- Farmersville, Illinois
- Farmersville, Indiana
- Farmersville, Kentucky
- Farmerville, Louisiana, also known as "Farmersville"
- Farmersville, Missouri
- Farmersville, New Jersey
- Farmersville, New York
- Farmersville, Pennsylvania
- Farmersville, Ohio
- Farmersville, Texas
- Farmersville, Wisconsin

== See also ==
- Farmville (disambiguation)
- Acton, Indiana, originally known as Farmersville
- Athens, Ontario, originally known as Farmersville
