= Farmville Basin =

Ancient rift basin in modern day Virginia

The Farmville Basin was one of the Eastern North America Rift Basins. It lies west of Virginia State Route 45 and includes Farmville, Virginia.

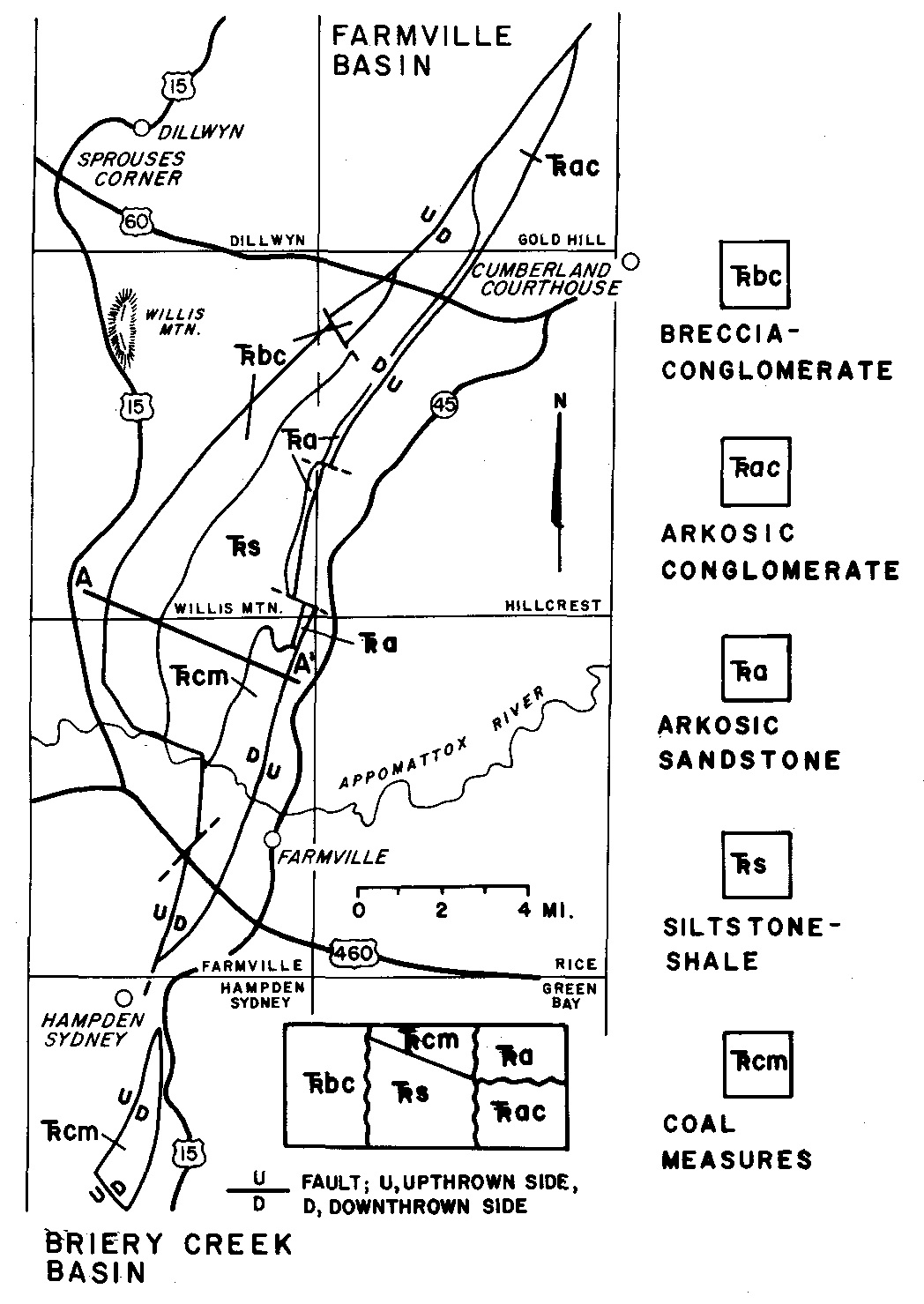
Farmville Basin Diagram from Virginia DMME

== Extent ==
The Farmville Basin lies in Virginia spreading North from Farmville, through Cumberland from modern day Cumberland State Forest to Briery Creek with a little bit in Buckingham.

== Farmville Basin Geology ==
The combined continents of Africa and the Americas split apart from the combined continent of Pangea during the Triassic Period. A small rift was opened in the Farmville area into which water flowed and allowed for wetland life. The wetland life was later covered with sediment forming clay, and the pressure formed soft, Bituminous coal over hundreds of millions of years.

Coal beds in the Triassic Basin near Richmond and Farmville were formed 205 to 245 million years ago, when Pangaea was splitting up rather than colliding. In the Triassic Basin, pressure to convert organic plant material into coal came from just the weight of overlying sediments, without tectonics. That is why the local coal is bituminous, rather than semi-anthracite.

== Farmville Basin Mining ==
The Prince Edward Coal Mining Company
- Company type: Private
- Industry: Coal
- Founded: (24 March 1837)
- Defunct: 1880
- Headquarters: Farmville, Virginia
- Area served: Farmville

Piedmont Coal Company
- Industry: Coal
- Founded: 1860 in Raines Tavern, Virginia, United States
- Founder: John Dalby

Coal was mined in the Briery Creek Watershed near Prince Edward Courthouse from as early as 1834 and by the Piedmont Mining Company in the 1860s. Daddow and Bannon, in 1866, described seven or eight coal seams ranging from 0.5 to 3.0 feet thick every 300 feet. They also reported that natural anthracite in some places. The individual seams were irregular and contained sulfur and other impurities. So mining was not as efficient as in the mountains of Virginia with huge seams.

== Clays for Brick Making ==
Triassic Clays are not so abundant but the clays of the Farmville Basin show some plasticity. Certain ones like those tested from Farmville would do for the manufacture of hollow brick. The clay was a good red color at the surface but had too much mica a few feet down. Some clays in the basin make bricks as hard as steel. Some brick making was done in the basin the 1870s.
