= Farmville station =

Farmville, VA
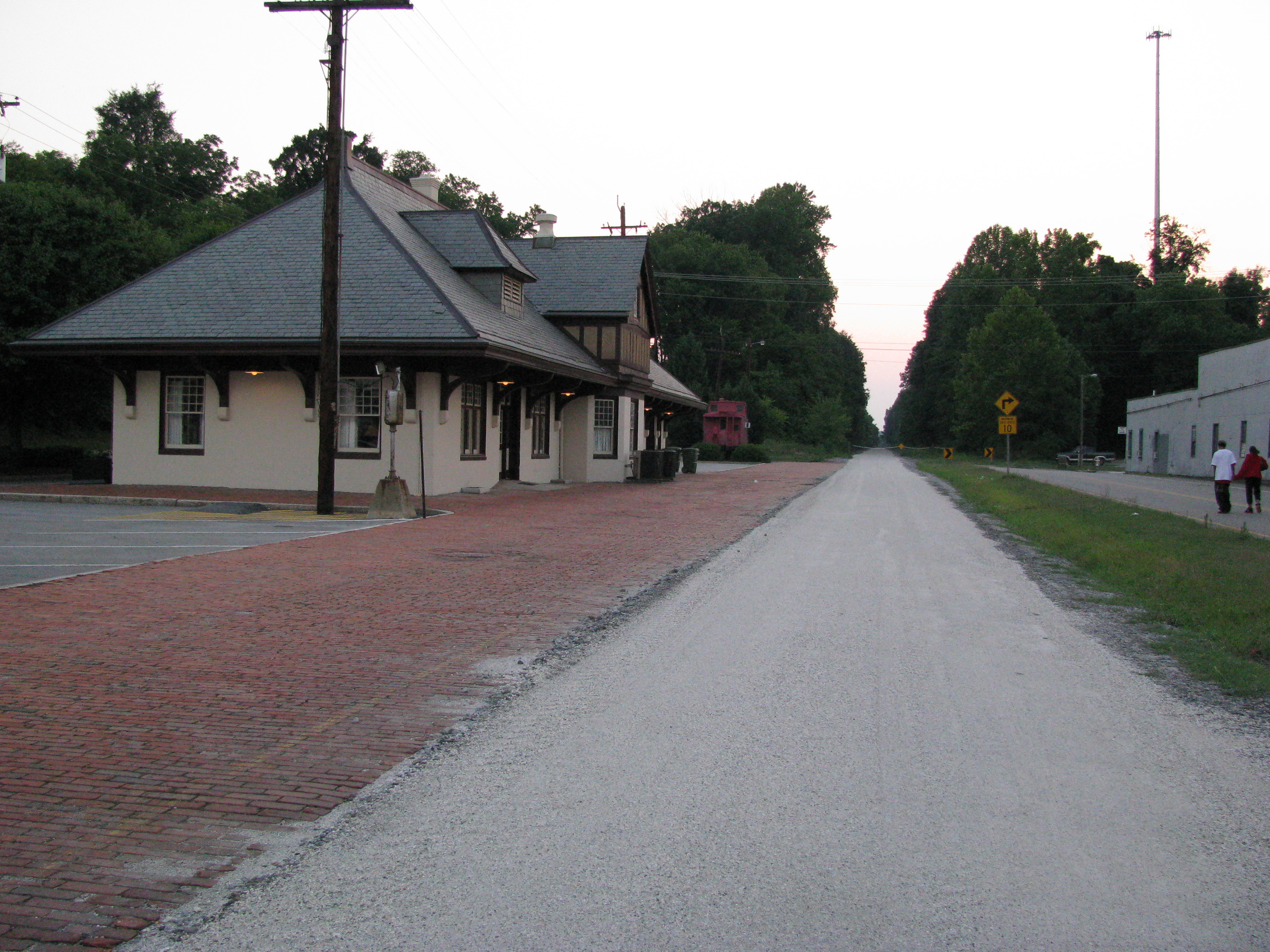
- Farmville station and the High Bridge Trail

General information
- Location: West Third Street, Farmville, Virginia
- Coordinates: 37°18′15.87″N 78°23′49.2″W
- Platforms: 1 side platform
- Tracks: None (1 before removal)
- Connections: Greyhound

Construction
- Accessible: Yes

History
- Opened: March 24, 1975
- Closed: April 30, 1971; October 1, 1979
- Rebuilt: c. 1905

Former services
Preceding station	Amtrak	Following station
Lynchburg (Woodall Road) toward Tri-State	Hilltopper	Nottoway County toward Boston South
Lynchburg (Woodall Road) toward Chicago	Mountaineer	Nottoway County toward Norfolk
Preceding station	Norfolk and Western Railway	Following station
Prospect toward Cincinnati	Main Line	Burkeville toward Norfolk
Location

Farmville station was an intercity rail station located in Farmville, Virginia. It was served by Norfolk and Western Railway passenger trains until around 1971. It was later served by Amtrak's Mountaineer from 1975 to 1977, then the Hilltopper until 1979. The station building remains extant.

== History ==
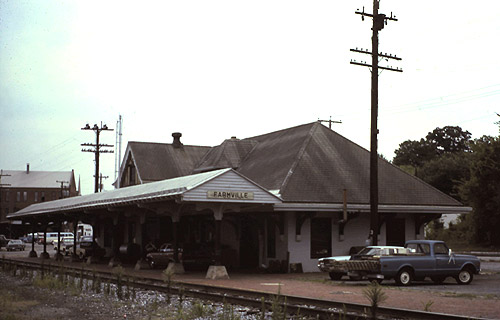
Farmville station in August 1983

The Southside Railroad was built through Farmville in 1857; stations at Farmville were served for over a century. When Amtrak took over intercity passenger rail service on May 1, 1971, it chose not to continue service on the Norfolk and Western Railway's Pocahontas, thus ending service to Farmville.

Service was restored on March 24, 1975, with the introduction of the Mountaineer service between Norfolk and Chicago. The Mountaineer was replaced by the Hilltopper on June 1, 1977. The Hilltopper was discontinued on October 1, 1979, ending rail service to Farmville for the second time. The station building remains extant, although the rail line was abandoned in 2006 for construction of the High Bridge Trail State Park.
