= Richmond Basin =

The Richmond Basin is one of the Eastern North America Rift Basins. It lies over Swift Creek Reservoir from Interstate 64 to the Appomattox River.

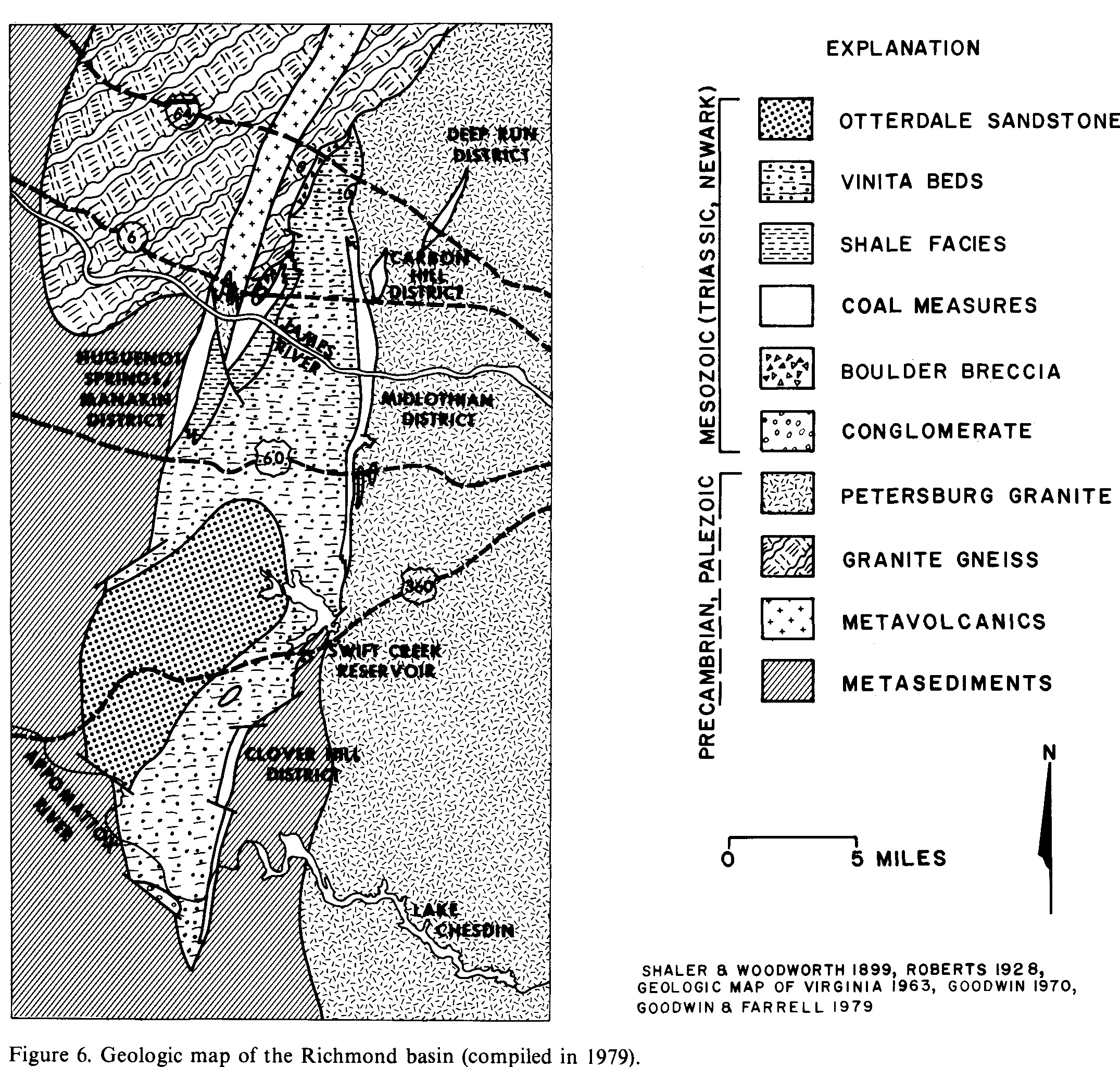
Richmond Basin Geological Diagram

== Extent ==
The Richmond Basin is a rift basin, making a north to south double pointed oval, with the eastern edge over the Swift Creek Reservoir, with the northern point at interstate 64, spanning the James River, with the southern point at the Appomattox River.

== Richmond Basin geology ==
The Richmond Basin is 205 to 245 million years old. Pangea divided and many small rifts split open in the earth in addition to the large one that became the Atlantic Ocean. When Richmond rift opened and filled with swamps from water in the Pamunkey River, sediment filled in over the swamps and the sedimentary pressure converted organic plant material into coal. This weight is less pressure than coal deposits produced when the continents were pushing together and raising up mountains. Semi-anthracite and anthracite are often formed by such tectonic squeezing when continents push together. The Richmond Basin has Bituminous coal, formed by the sedimentary weight only.

The coal deposits were on a thin shale and sandstone layer over the granite bedrock. Oolite or small round grains of calcium carbonate was over the coal. Some coke with and without sulphur was with the coal.

To the northwest of the basin is the Goochland Terrane, and between them is the Boscobel complex.

== Richmond Basin mining ==
The Richmond Basin is located near Midlothian, Virginia, in Chesterfield County, Virginia. It was mined in the early 18th century. Coal was carried on the Chesterfield Railroad in gravity and mule-pulled carts to Manchester, Richmond, Virginia and Richmond, Virginia. Wood burning trains, such as the Clover Hill Railroad then the Brighthope Railway transported the coal found at Clover Hill in later years. The coal from Midlothian, Virginia was mainly used in Richmond, Virginia and Petersburg, Virginia. The Clover Hill Pits in Winterpock, Virginia were sold as far away as New York City from the 1840s to the 1890s. The supply was not as great and as cheap to mine as the Pocahontas coalfield, however and mining the Richmond Basin was ended around 1890. Richmond and Petersburg grew economically because of manufacturing supported by the James River and Appomattox River waterpower, more than from coal brought out of Midlothian and Clover Hill."
