= Farmville Historic District (Farmville, Virginia) =

Historic district in Virginia, United States

- U.S. National Register of Historic Places
- U.S. Historic district
- Virginia Landmarks Register
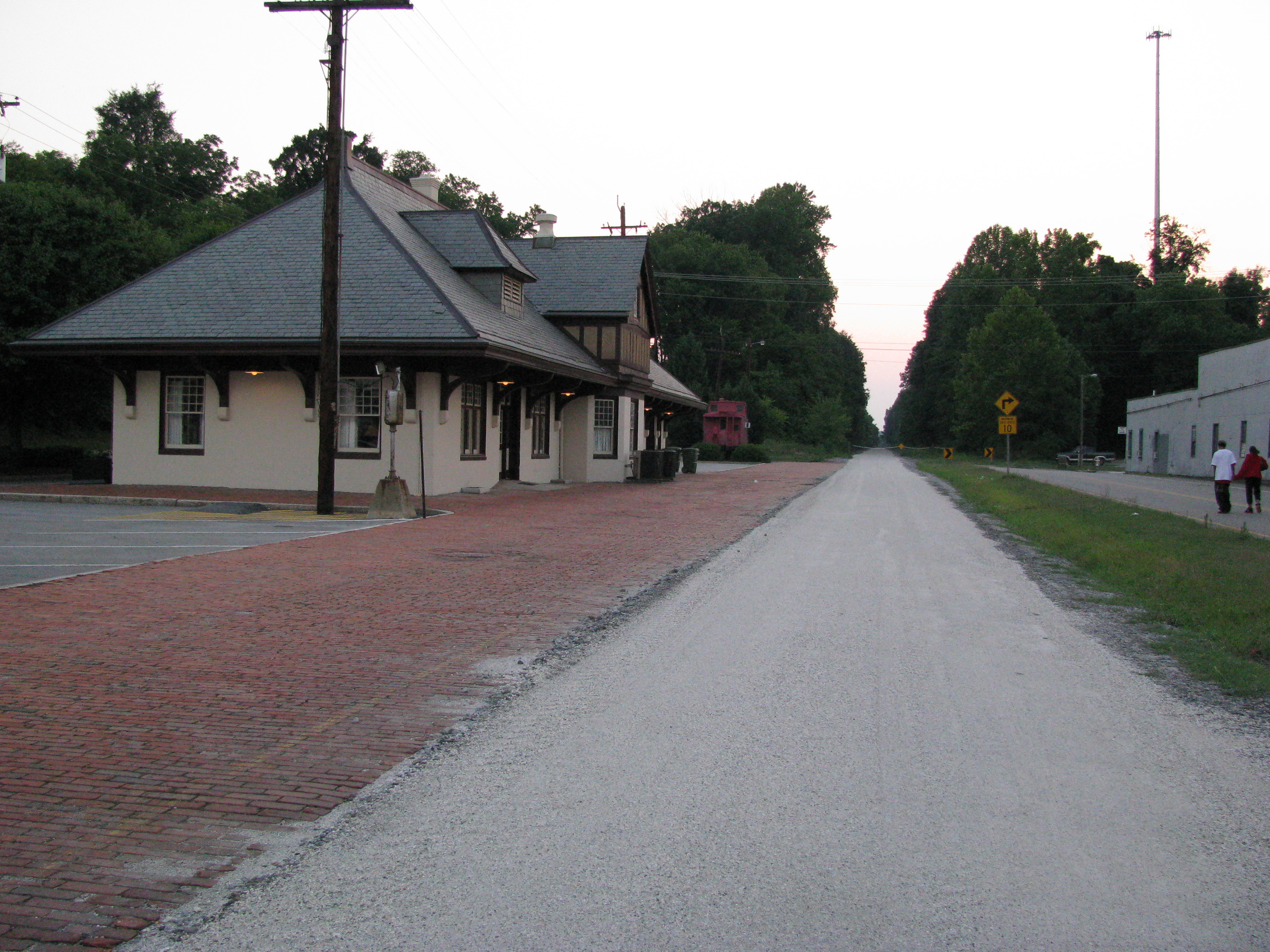
- Norfolk and Western depot with the High Bridge Trail

- Location within Virginia Location within the United States
- Location: Roughly bounded by Main, Venable, High, Ely, School, First Ave., Irving, Second Ave., Oak, W. Third St., and Mill, Farmville, Virginia
- Coordinates: 37°18′1″N 78°23′55″W
- Architect: Multiple
- Architectural style: Greek Revival, Late Victorian, Federal
- NRHP reference No.: 89001822
- VLR No.: 144-0027

Significant dates
- Added to NRHP: October 30, 1989
- Designated VLR: April 18, 1989; October 11, 2005

Farmville Historic District is a national historic district located at Farmville, Prince Edward County, Virginia. It encompasses 246 contributing buildings and 1 contributing object (the Confederate Monument) in the central business district and surrounding residential areas of Farmville. It includes a variety of commercial, residential, institutional, and industrial buildings dating from the mid-19th to early-20th centuries. Notable buildings include the Paulett-Gill house (c. 1858), Farmville Presbyterian Church (1828, 1859), Johns Memorial Episcopal Church (1881), Farmville Methodist Church (1907), Hotel Weyanoke (1925), the warehouses of the Dunnington Tobacco Company and Central Virginia Processing, Inc., the former Craddock-Terry Shoe Company, the former Cunningham and Company tobacco prizery, Norfolk and Western Railroad passenger station (c. 1905), Doyne Building (c. 1890), the Watkins M. Abbitt Federal Building (1917), Prince Edward County Courthouse, and the former Farmville High School (1913). Located in the district is the separately listed First Baptist Church.

It was listed on the National Register of Historic Places in 1989.
