= Nathaniel M. Griggs =

American politician (died 1919)

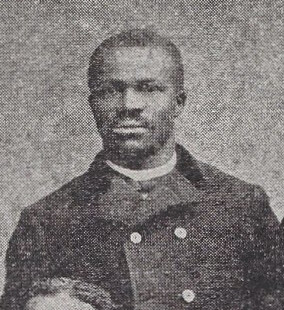

Member of the Senate of Virginia
- In office 1887–1890

Member of the Virginia House of Delegates
- In office 1883–1884

Personal details
- Born: 1857
- Died: June 5, 1919 (aged 61–62)

Nathaniel M. Griggs (1857 - June 5, 1919) was an African American politician in Virginia.

== Biography ==
Griggs was born a slave in Farmville, Virginia to 1857 to Matthew and Nicy Washington. He later attended night school, and would work in a tobacco factory worker before getting fired for making political speeches.

He served in the Virginia House of Delegates from 1883 to 1884 and in the Senate of Virginia from 1887 to 1890. He moved to Washington, D.C., and worked at the Bureau of Engraving and Printing. After a Democrat became president, he worked at various other jobs. He went on to become a jeweler for the Wanamaker Company in Philadelphia.

He is buried at the Odd Fellows Cemetery (Farmville, Virginia) in Farmville, Virginia.

== Legacy ==
Griggs would be the last African American to serve in the Senate of Virginia until the election of future Governor Douglas Wilder, who was elected to the body in 1969.

== See also ==
- African American officeholders from the end of the Civil War until before 1900
