= Farmville Plantation =

Historic house in North Carolina, United States

- U.S. National Register of Historic Places
- Location within North Carolina Location within the United States
- Location: Southeast of Elmwood off US 70 on SR 2362, near Elmwood, North Carolina
- Coordinates: 35.73944°N 80.76500°W
- Area: 6 acres (2.4 ha)
- Built: 1818
- Architectural style: Federal, Federal
- MPS: Iredell County MRA
- NRHP reference No.: 73001353
- Added to NRHP: June 19, 1973

Farmville Plantation is a historic plantation house located near the historic location, called Elmwood south of Statesville in Iredell County, North Carolina. It consists of two Federal style houses. The main house was built about 1818, and is a two-story, three bay by two bay, brick dwelling with a two-story entrance portico. The house is also known as the Joseph Chambers house or Darshana. The main house has a low gable roof and one-story rear shed porch. Attached to it by a breezeway is a smaller two-story, three bay by two bay stuccoed brick dwelling. The house was restored in the 1960s.

It was added to the National Register of Historic Places in 1973.

== History ==
The Farmville Plantation was built by Joseph Chambers (1791–1848) in about 1820. The land was worked by enslaved people who were held on the plantation. Joseph's son, Pinckney Brown Chambers (1821–1905) was born on the plantation and inherited it from his father.
