= Farmville Historic District (Farmville, North Carolina) =

Historic district in North Carolina, United States

- U.S. National Register of Historic Places
- U.S. Historic district
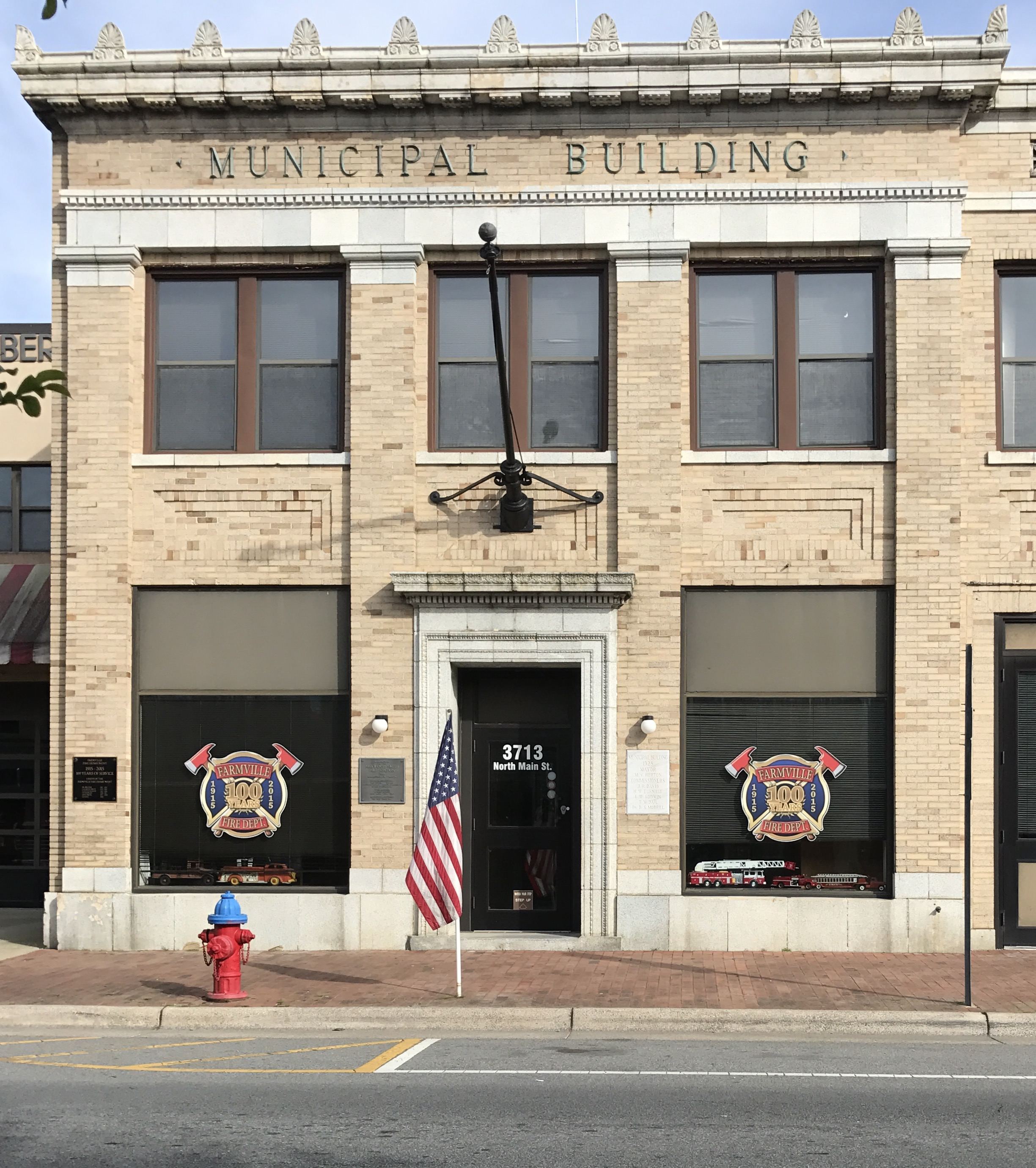
- Farmville Municipal Building, part of the historic district

- Location within North Carolina Location within the United States
- Location: Roughly bounded by Turnage, Pine, Jones, and Waverly Sts., Farmville, North Carolina
- Coordinates: 35°35′56″N 77°35′11″W
- Area: 116 acres (47 ha)
- Built: 1860
- Architect: Benton & Benton
- Architectural style: Colonial Revival, Classical Revival, Queen Anne
- NRHP reference No.: 93001121
- Added to NRHP: October 21, 1993

Farmville Historic District is a national historic district located at Farmville, Pitt County, North Carolina. The district encompasses 330 contributing buildings, 1 contributing site, and 2 contributing structures in the central business district and surrounding residential sections of Farmville. It includes buildings dated from about 1860 to 1942 and notable examples of Colonial Revival, Classical Revival, and Queen Anne style architecture. Notable buildings include the James W. May House (c. 1860), Fields-Rasberry House (c. 1900), Dr. David Morrill House (c. 1909), Warren Parker House, Nannie Smith House (c. 1884), First Christian Church (1910), Emmanuel Episcopal Church (1920), St. Elizabeth Catholic Church, Municipal Building (1928) possibly designed by Benton & Benton, Bank of Farmville (1921) designed by Benton & Benton, Pollard Auto Company Building, Paramount Theatre (1930s), J. Y. Monk Tobacco Warehouse, and East Carolina Railway Office and Freight Station.

It was listed on the National Register of Historic Places in 1993.
