= Davis v. County School Board of Prince Edward County =

- Supreme Court of the United States

Argued December 9, 1952 Reargued December 8, 1955 Decided May 17, 1954
- Full case name: Dorothy E. Davis, et al. v. County School Board of Prince Edward County, Virginia
- Citations: 347 U.S. 483 (more) 74 S. Ct. 686; 98 L. Ed. 873; 1954 U.S. LEXIS 2094; 53 Ohio Op. 326; 38 A.L.R.2d 1180

Case history
- Prior: Judgment for defendants, United States District Court for the Western District of Virginia
- Subsequent: Judgment on relief, 349 U.S. 294 (1955) (Brown II); on remand, 139 F. Supp. 468 (D. Kan. 1955); motion to intervene granted, 84 F.R.D. 383 (D. Kan. 1979); judgment for defendants, 671 F. Supp. 1290 (D. Kan. 1987); reversed, 892 F.2d 851 (10th Cir. 1989); vacated, 503 U.S. 978 (1992) (Brown III); judgment reinstated, 978 F.2d 585 (10th Cir. 1992); judgment for defendants, 56 F. Supp. 2d 1212 (D. Kan. 1999)

Holding
- Segregation of students in public schools violates the Equal Protection Clause of the Fourteenth Amendment, because separate facilities are inherently unequal. District Court of Virginia reversed.

Court membership
- Chief Justice Earl Warren Associate Justices Hugo Black · Stanley F. Reed; Felix Frankfurter · William O. Douglas; Robert H. Jackson · Harold H. Burton; Tom C. Clark · Sherman Minton

Case opinion
- Majority: Warren, joined by unanimous

Laws applied
- United States Constitution, Amendment XIV

Davis v. County School Board of Prince Edward County, 347 U.S. 483, was one of the five cases combined into Brown v. Board of Education, the famous case in which the U.S. Supreme Court, in 1954, officially overturned racial segregation in U.S. public schools. The Davis case was the only such case to be initiated by a student protest. The case challenged segregation in Prince Edward County, Virginia.

== Background ==
R.R. Moton High School, an all-black high school in Farmville, Virginia, suffered from terrible conditions due to underfunding. Built in 1939 to hold 180 students, by 1940 it was educating over 450. The school did not have a gymnasium, a cafeteria, or an auditorium with fixed seats, and students and student athletes often re-used old, worn books, equipment, and athletic uniforms handed down from the nearby white school. County officials handled the overcrowding problem not by expanding or rebuilding the school, but by building temporary classroom structures. These were unevenly heated by potbelly stoves, covered by leaky roofs that had the students using umbrellas inside when it rained, and sometimes mistaken for chicken coops by people who didn't know any different.

Teachers and students did not have desks or blackboards, and due to overcrowding, some students had to take classes in an immobilized, decrepit school bus parked outside the main school building. Some classes were held in "three temporary tar-paper shacks" built to house the overflow at the school. It was so cold during the winter that teachers and students had to keep their coats on. The school's bus was said to be hand-me-down from the white school and was driven by the history teacher.

Led by the Reverend Francis Griffin, who served as both President of the local NAACP and as Chair of the school's PTA, the school's leadership requested new facilities but were denied by the school board.

In response, on April 23, 1951, a 16-year-old student named Barbara Rose Johns, who was the niece of Vernon Johns, the famous black Baptist preacher and civil rights leader, covertly organized a student general strike. She forged notes to teachers telling them to bring their students to the auditorium for a special announcement. When the school's students showed up, Johns took the stage and persuaded the school to strike to protest poor school conditions. Over 450 walked out and marched to the homes of members of the school board, who refused to see them and instead threatened them with expulsions. This led to a two-week protest from students.

Meanwhile, the headmaster had been told over the phone that the police were about to arrest two of his students at the bus station. He failed to recognize this call as a ruse, so he went to town. Only thereafter were the notes calling the special assembly delivered to the classrooms. When the headmaster returned, he tried to talk the students out of striking, but they refused.

Led by Johns, the students requested help from the NAACP's Special Counsel for the Southeastern Region of the United States. The NAACP lawyers agreed to represent the students in court, if the students would agree to seek an end to school segregation altogether and an overturning of the "separate but equal" judicial doctrine that had been established by Plessy vs. Ferguson and had allowed for educational segregation over the last sixty years, rather than merely suing for new, improved school facilities. After some consideration, the students agreed to this.

== Trials ==
On May 23, 1951, two NAACP lawyers, Spottswood Robinson and Oliver Hill, filed suit against the Prince Edward County School District in United States District Court, Eastern Division of Virginia, Richmond Division, on behalf of 117 students. Dorothy Davis was the first plaintiff listed, and therefore the case bore her name, not Barbara Johns'. The school district was represented by T. Justin Moore, Archibald G. ("Archie") Robertson and John W. Riely of Hunton, Williams, Gay, Powell & Gibson (now known as Hunton Andrews Kurth), a large Richmond law firm. J. Lindsay Almond, the Attorney General of Virginia, assisted them. The case was titled Dorothy E. Davis, et al. versus County School Board of Prince Edward County, Virginia.

The case went to trial over February 25–29 of the following year, 1952. The NAACP and the students it represented sought a judgement from the court declaring that the system of segregating school students by race was discriminatory to the point of being in violation of the 14th Amendment of the United States Constitution.

On March 7, the three-judge panel of the U.S. District Court issued its ruling. It was unanimous, in favor of the school board and against the students, upholding the principle of separate but equal and declaring "We have found no hurt or harm to either race." In addition to upholding the principle of separate but equal, the justices upheld the validity of Virginia state laws that required segregated schools. They did, however, order the school district to comply with the separate but equal principle of the law, and correct the inequalities between schools for white students and schools for black students.

The case was then appealed to the U.S. Supreme Court and consolidated with four other cases from other districts around the country into the famous Brown v. Board of Education case. In it, the US Supreme Court ruled that segregation in public education was, effectively, unconstitutional and illegal.

== Aftermath ==
The ruling was extremely unpopular among white Virginians and a considerable number of them attempted to resist integration through every means possible, during a period known as Massive Resistance. Schools remained segregated for several years. By 1959, J. Lindsay Almond had become Governor of Virginia, and faced with continuing losses in the courts, he dismantled the system of segregated schools in that state. Nevertheless, the Board of Supervisors for Prince Edward County refused to appropriate any funds for the County School Board at all, effectively closing all public schools rather than integrate them. White students often attended "segregation academies", which were all-white private schools that were formed. Black students had to go to school elsewhere or forgo their education altogether. Prince Edward County schools remained closed for five years, from 1959 to 1964.

In 2008, the case and the protest which led to it were memorialized on the grounds of the Virginia State Capitol in the Virginia Civil Rights Memorial.

== See also ==
- Griffin v. County School Board of Prince Edward County
- List of landmark African-American court cases
- Stanley Plan
