= Tidewater and Western Railroad =

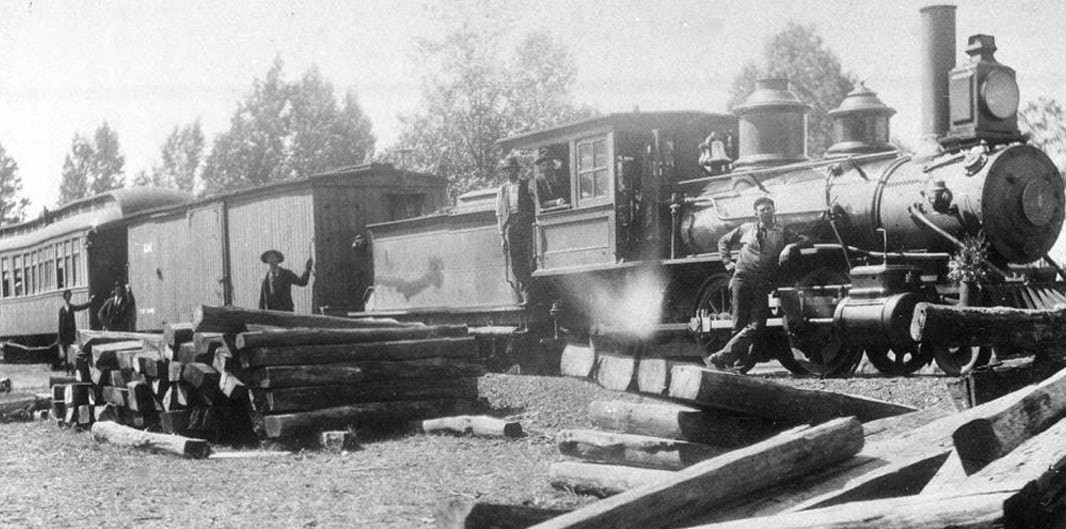
- Tidewater and Western Railroad at Bermuda Hundred

Overview
- Headquarters: Richmond, Virginia
- Locale: Chesterfield, Virginia
- Dates of operation: 1905-06-07–1917-05-07
- Successor: abandoned

Technical
- Track gauge: 3 ft (914 mm)
- Length: 1 routes 3 spurs: 96 miles (150 km)

The Farmville and Powhatan Railroad went bankrupt in 1905 and became the Tidewater and Western Railroad. The line survived until 1917 when it was pulled up and sent to France for the World War I effort. The Tidewater and Western Railroad carried freight and passengers along a route from Farmville, Virginia to Bermuda Hundred. The Tidewater and Western Railroad continued to have Western Union Telegraphs run along the rails. These connected to telegraphs on the Atlantic Coast Line along the East Coast of the US and to Europe.

== History ==
=== Businesses that used the Tidewater and Western ===
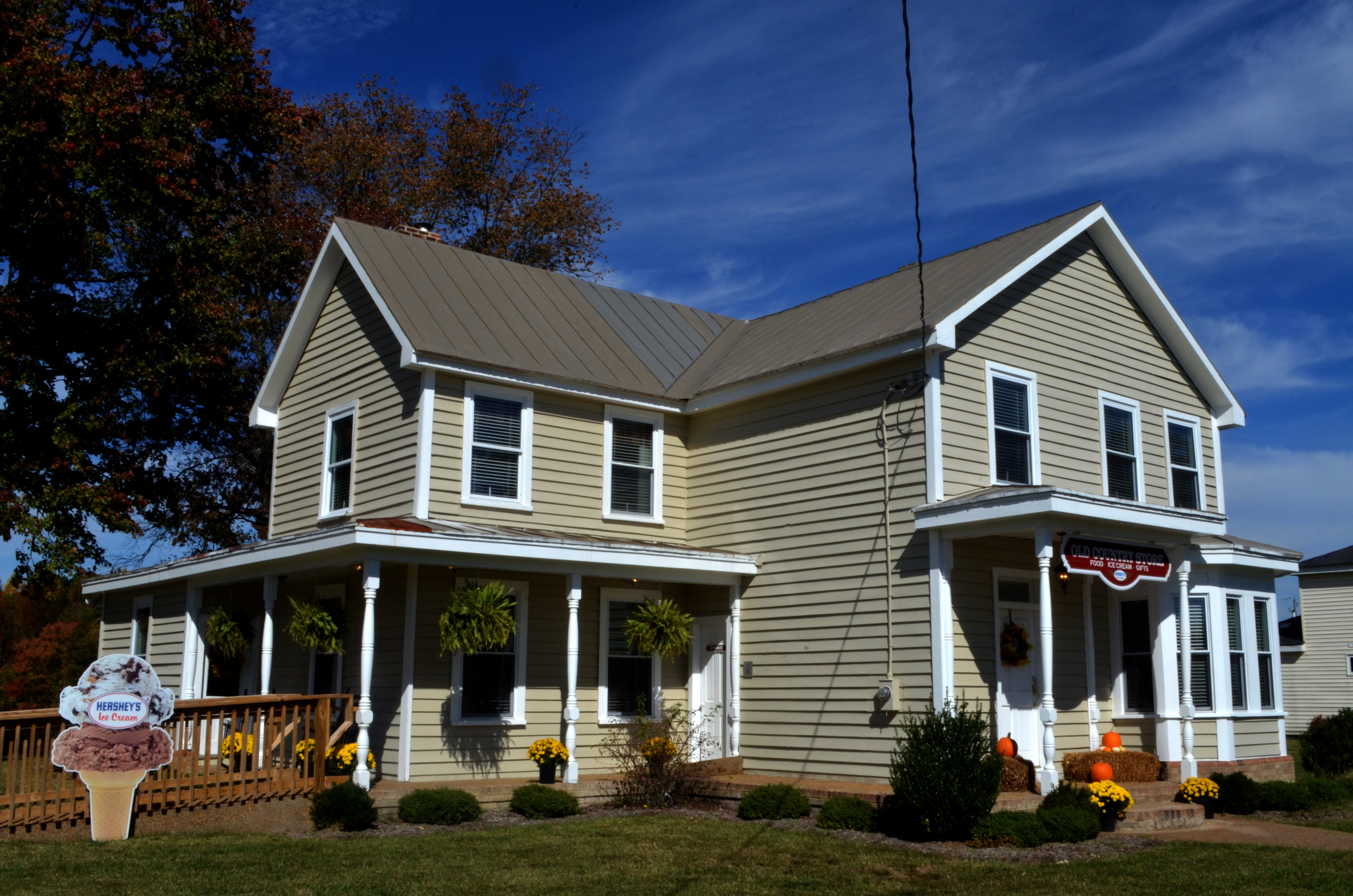
The Village of Beach Station was a stop on the Tidewater and Western Railroad as well as the Farmville and Powhatan.

Rail Transport from Cumberland County helped Cumberland farmers sell fruits, vegetables and timber to Farmville markets. A magazine notice for renting the Turkey Island Plantation advertised that the farm is near the Tobaccoville station of the Tidewater and Western Railroad which would help the farmer get dairy products to market. From 1884 to 1917, the Farmville and Powhatan Railroad, later named the Tidewater and Western Railroad, was important to Cumberland County residents for markets and transportation and the telegraph. The owners hoped that the line would ship products all the way to Chester, Virginia and docks at Bermuda Hundred to make the railroad profitable. However, the line had trouble competing with the Standard gauge Southern railway.

=== Coal to Ship over Rails ===
Farmville Coal and Iron Company
- Company type: Private
- Industry: Coal
- Founded: (1881)
- Defunct: 1880s
- Headquarters: Farmville, Virginia
- Area served: Farmville

The Farmville Coal and Iron Company built a one and a half mile spur rail line from the Farmville and Powhatan Railroad to the mine. This railroad provided transport from the mine to the docks at Bermuda Hundred in the Tidewater region. On Jan. 24, 1891, an editor of “The Financial Mining Record” suggested that the Farmville Coal & Iron Company did not have enough coal production to justify a fraction of its stock price. The Norfolk and Western Railway, since 1883, had been bringing in coal from a new coal mine, the Pocahontas Coalfield, which could provide coal more cheaply and ship the coal on a larger standard gauge, class one railroad. This decreased to the economic viability of mining coal in the Richmond and Farmville Basins. The Farmville Coal and Iron Company went bankrupt a few years later, possibly before any coal was mined.

=== Financial Difficulties ===
The Tidewater and Western Railroad was losing money each year, the lawyers reported. If the railroad increased rates, they would lose customers to the Southern Railway. The State Corporation resisted letting investors close railroads if there was an alternative investor who was willing to run them. Wealthy investors in Cumberland, where much of the tracks lay, were unwilling to purchase all shares at less than the value of all of the property owned by the company because the Tidewater and Western Railroad had not been able to pay a dividend after taxes.

==== Hopes to Save the Tidewater and Western ====
In 1917, two attempts at stating industries were made which could have saved the Tidewater and Western Railroad by giving it something to haul.

===== Clay =====
Thomas A. Bolling tried brickmaking from clay in the Farmville Basin in 1917. He used a pug mill to make bricks from the clay. He had a plant on High Street. Ries and Somers tested his clay and clay from another pit and found that some of it could even be used for hollow bricks which must be stronger as well as drain tile.

===== Oil =====
Also in 1917, the Tidewater Oil and Gas Company drilled an exploratory hole over 1500 feet deep in the Fork Swamp area in the Willis River. Oil was found about 1000 ft down but the company eventually closed 1921.

==== Bankruptcy of the Tidewater Western Railroad ====
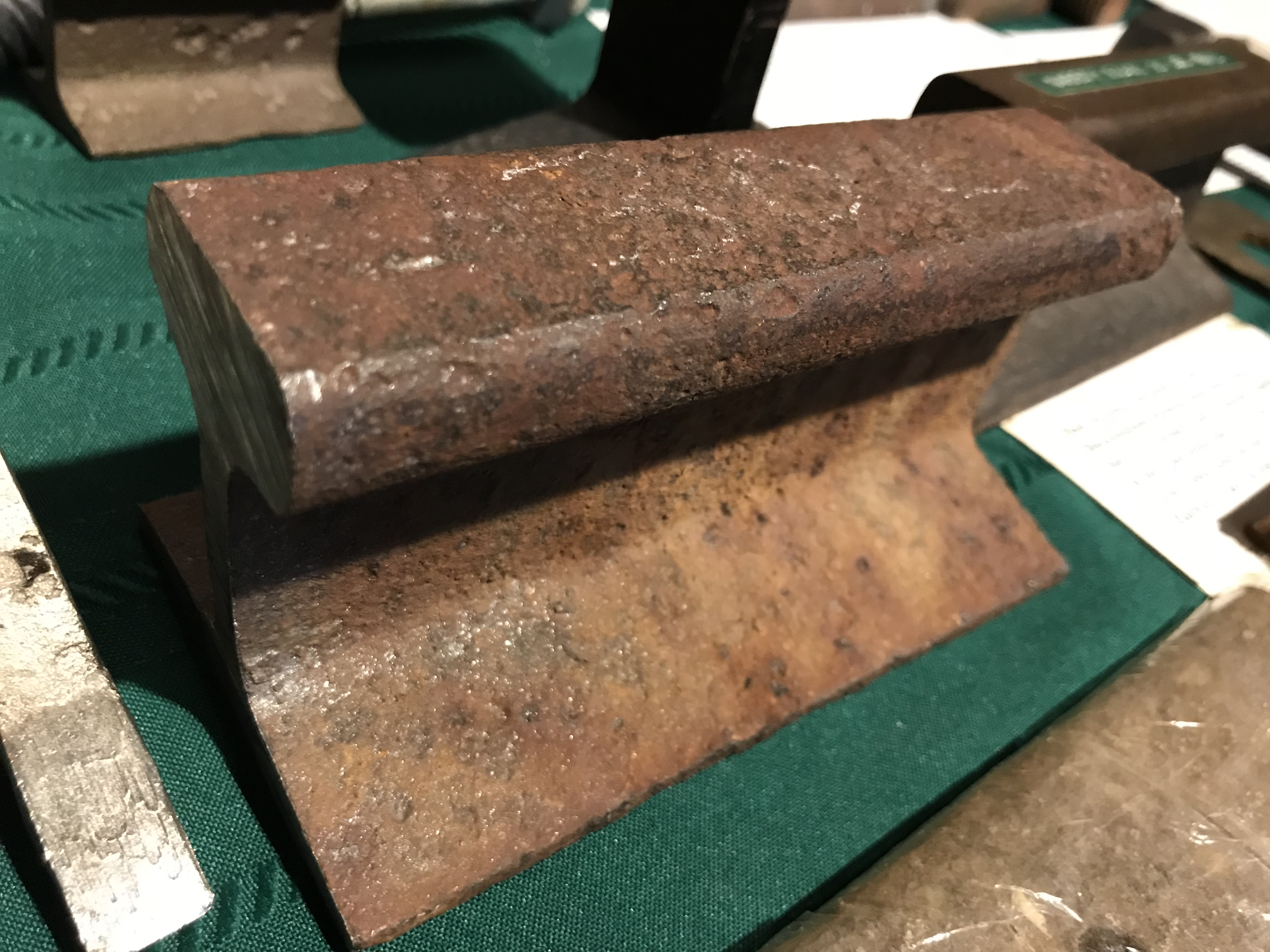
A Narrow-gauge rail on display at the Richmond Railroad Museum in Richmond, Virginia.

The Tidewater and Western, eventually had to be sold. George M. Wilson, who had been treasurer of this railroad and two predecessors operated the railroad until he died in April 1917. The French Government then bought the railroad's portable assets from the receiver for the World War I effort. The rails, ties and cars other than a few engines were driven up the docks at Bermuda Hundred and shipped across the Atlantic Ocean. Some of the engines were sold to be used in the U.S. A piece of the rail was left at the Railroad Museum in Richmond. The rails were never used for replacing bombed rails as had been planned.

=== Automobile Roads built on Track Bed ===
Virginia State Route 10 was built from Bermuda Hundred on the north side of the Appomattox River east almost to Chesterfield Court House on or near the old railroad tracks in 1918, after the railroad was sold. Beach road was built from near the Chesterfield Courthouse, to Winterpock on or near the old railbed. There a gas station still operates which was built to serve Winterpock in 1926. Near the old Nash stop, near Nash road, is the old granite Swift Creek Rail Bridge hidden in the woods behind a landfill and housing complex. Coalboro Road is built on or near the spur from Colboro to Epps Falls.

The Tidewater and Western track bed in Cumberland County was replaced with Virginia State Route 13 in 1918, following the sale of the tracks. A road for automobiles. Virginia State Route 45, which was also built on the track bed of the Tidewater & Western Railroad, was built from Cumberland to Farmville in 1928.

== Stations ==
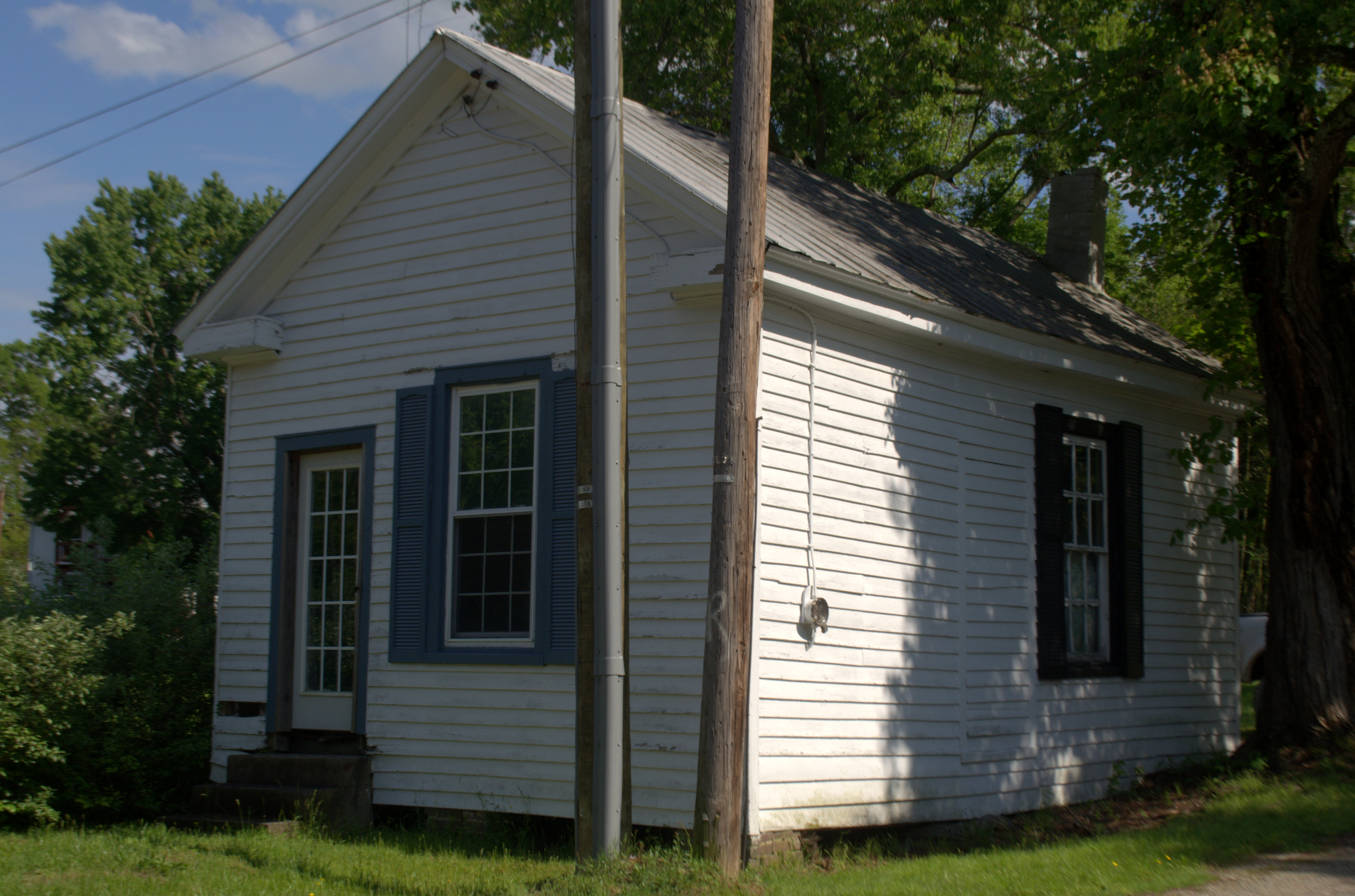
Moseley Junction 1891 Post Office which had a Closed-pouch Mail system with the train.

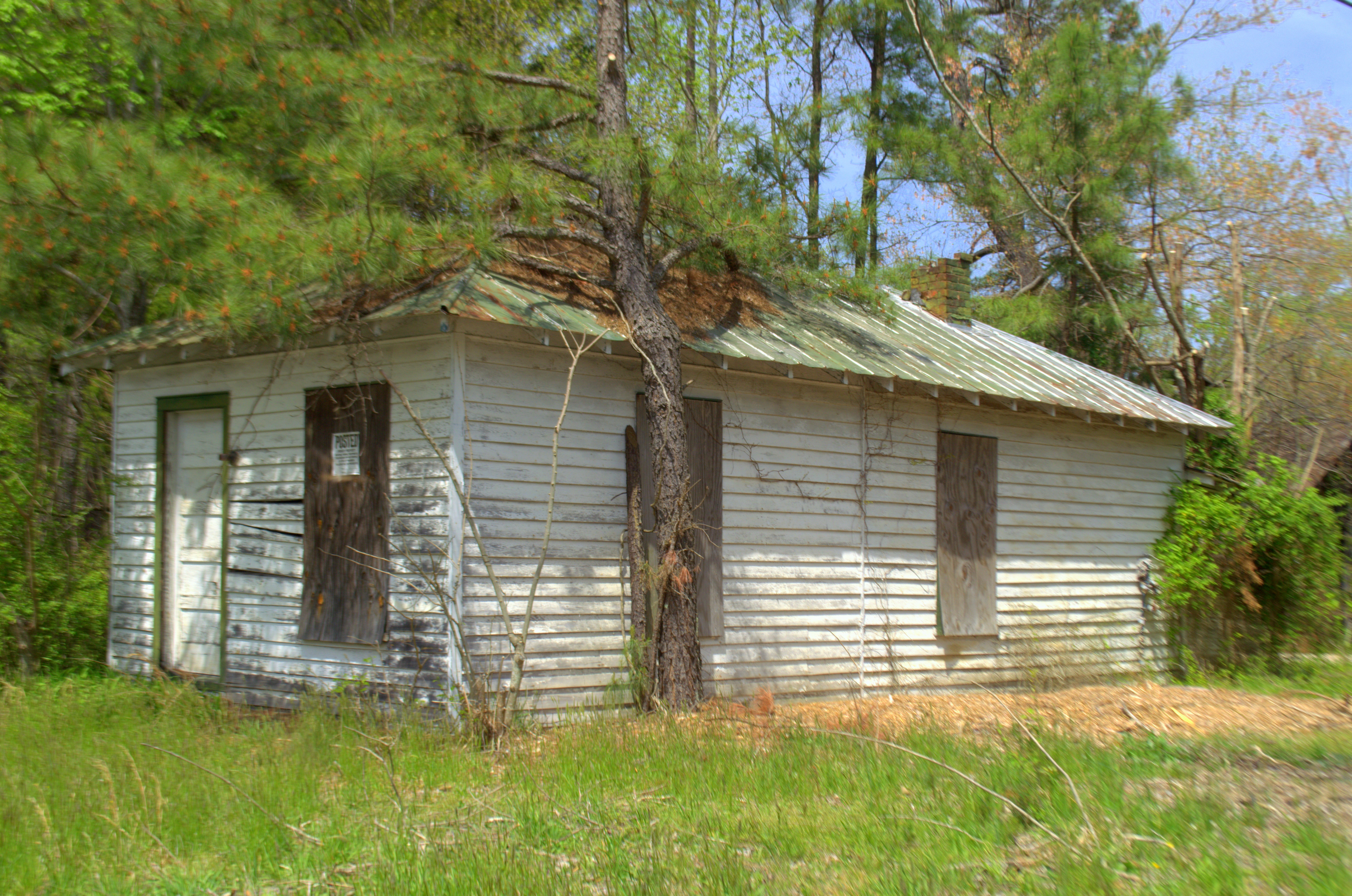
The Purdue Station is shown here in 2016 at 12702 Beach Road in Chesterfield, Virginia

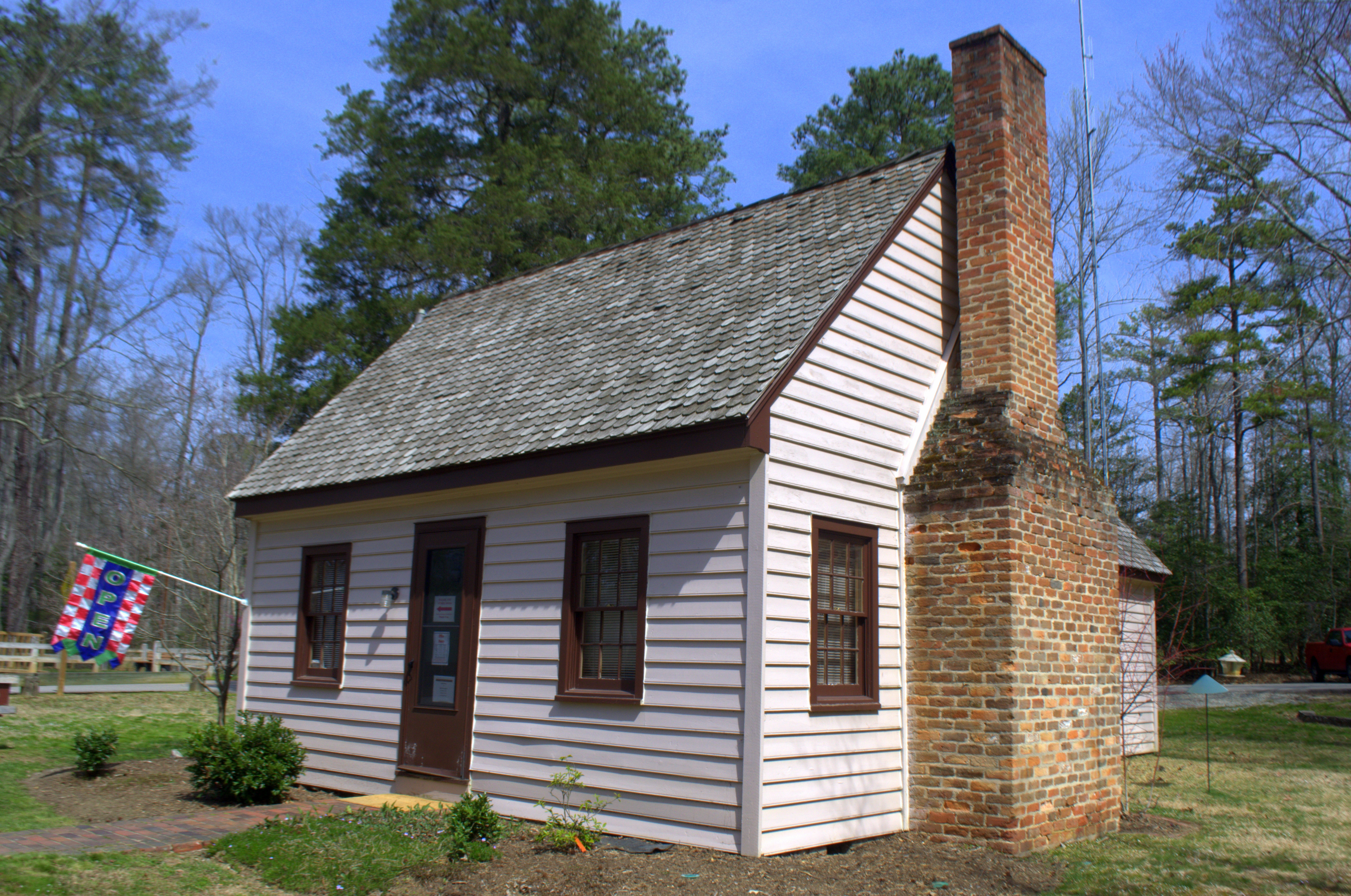
Fendley Station remodeled into a Park Office

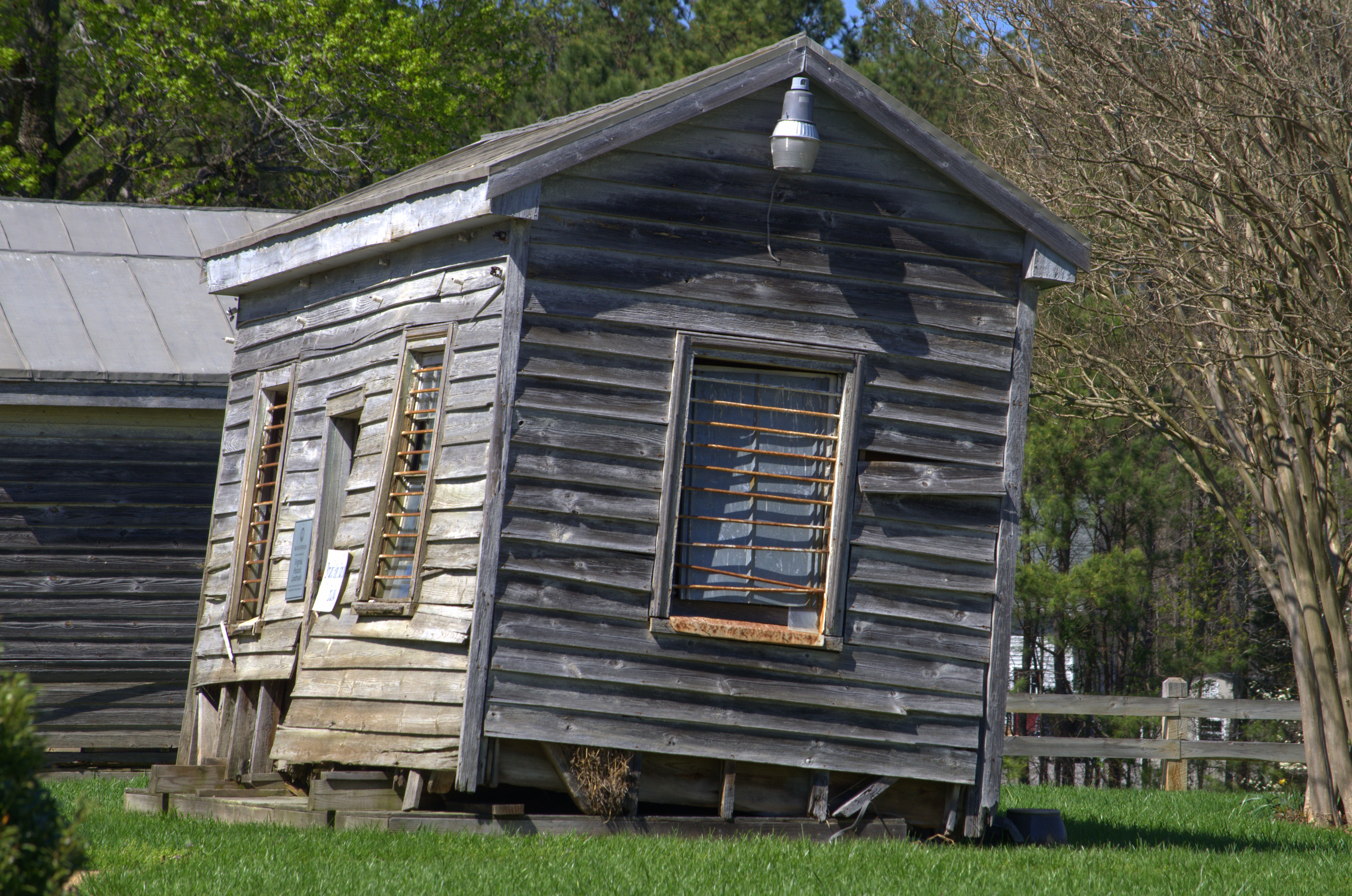
Railroad Depot, Beach Station, Chesterfield, Virginia.

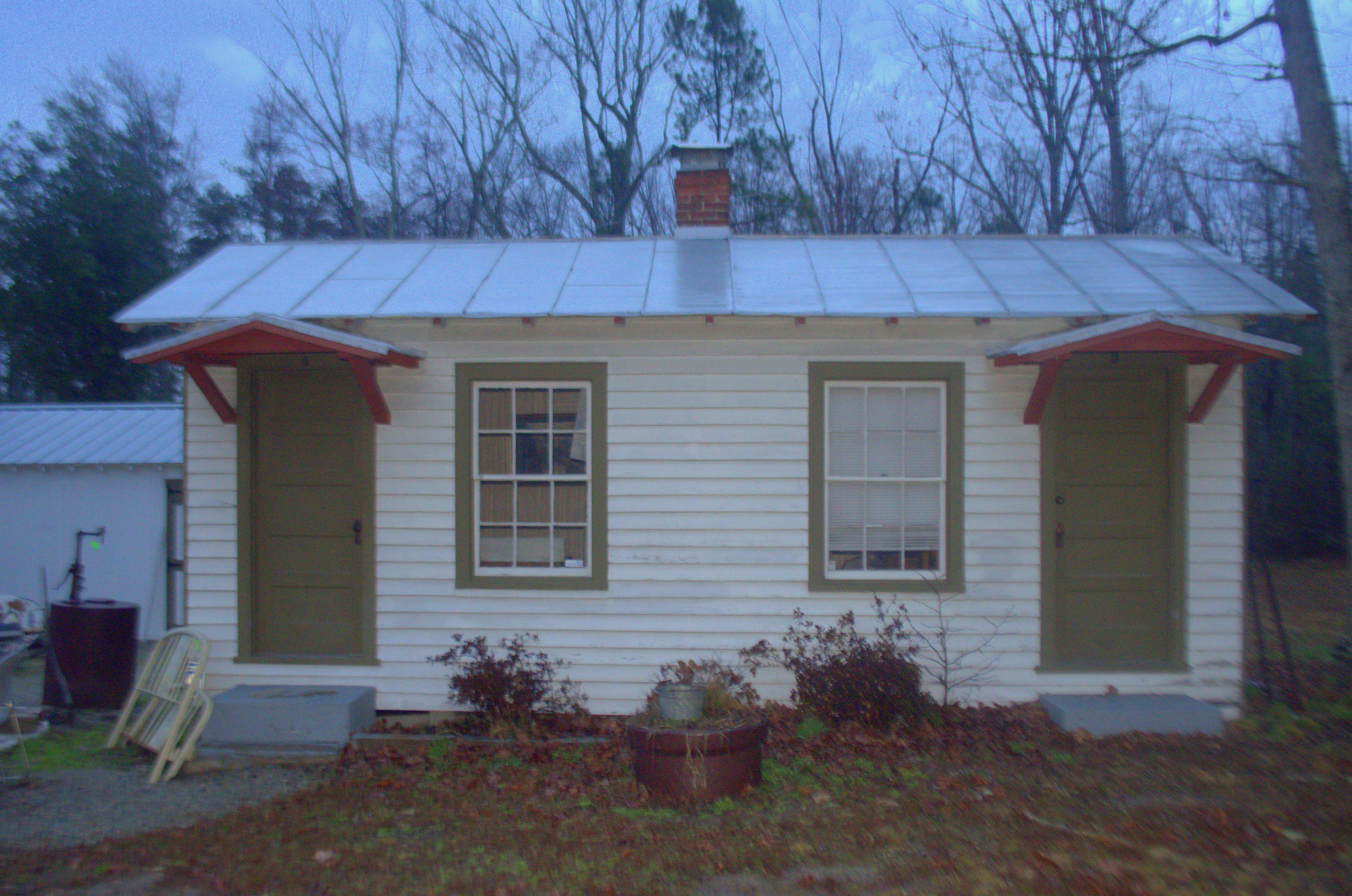
Skinquarter Train Depot

The Tidewater and Western Railroad was a ninety three mile line, plus spurs, after the merger. The rails had a bridge over the Atlantic Coast Line Railroad and the Swift Creek Rail Bridge and three other bridges. Two were iron and three were wooden.

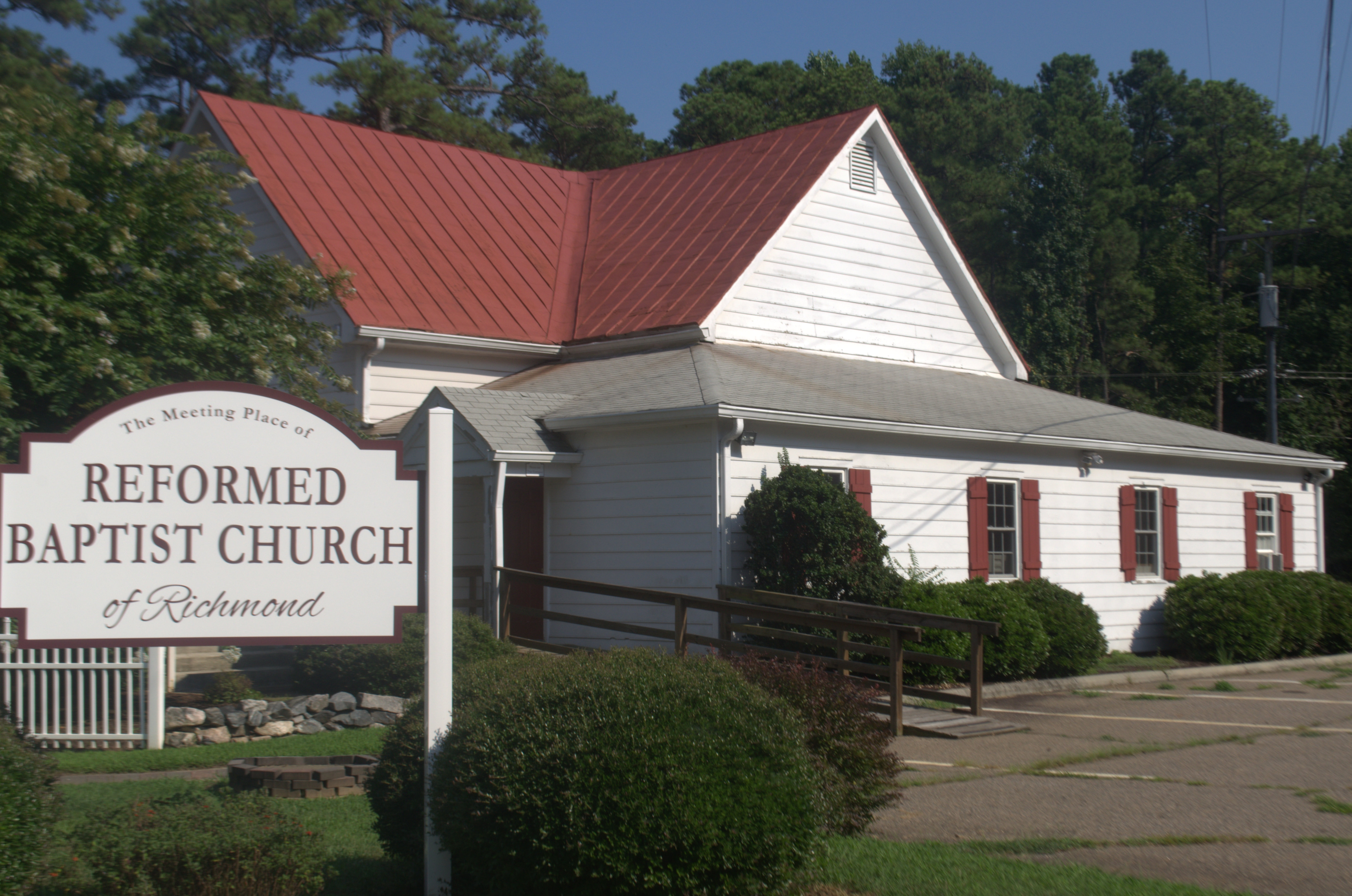
Reformed Baptist Church of Richmond in Winterpock since 1825, across from the Summit train stop

- Farmville
  - Farmville Junction, with the Southern Railway.
- Raine's, Raines Tavern had a spur line built to the Piedmont Mines near Farmville.
- Fork, possibly road to Fork Swamp area in the Willis River.
- Eulalie
- McRae
- Cumberland;
- Grays
- Sunnyside
- Tobaccoville
- Ballsville
- Macon
- Powhatan
- Negro Arm: Academy Rd was once called Negro Arm Road and intersects Old Buckingham Road just east of Powhatan and before the Red Lane Tavern.
- Flat Rock
  - Phaup: a spur line off of Moseley's Junction;
- Moseley's Junction: 1919 Mosley Rd where passengers could connect with the Southern Railway.
- Skinquarter
  - Coalboro: A spur line off of Winterpock.
- West SW of Winterpock Bridge
- Winterpock
- Summit
- Perdue
- Beach: 70 Miles from Farmville.
- Fendley; a Water Station, where the steam locomotive could get water needed to make steam, was moved a few miles in modern times to become the office of Pocahontas State Park.
- Nash: Now Nash Road
- Chester Office
  - A.C.L. Depot (Atlantic Coast Line Depot) a railroad depot on the Atlantic Coast Line Railroad. A spur line off of the Chester station to the Depot.
- R & P Electric Railway, the Chester Stop of world's first electric Trolley which ran from Richmond to Petersburg.
- Ochre; a former town named Ochre, site of Bermuda Ochre Company on a road to an ochre mine that also contained hematite next to Point of Rocks.
- Bermuda Warehouse where coal could be loaded onto ships.

=== Train Cars ===
The Tidewater and Western Locomotive had from seven to eight engines. There were nine passenger cars and 2 baggage cars. The train hauled mostly freight and there were 143 freight cars.

== Location ==
The Tidewater and Western extended from Farmville to Mosley, where it crossed the Southern, to Chester, where it crossed the Atlantic Coast Line and the Richmond Trolley, all the way to Bermuda Hundred where goods could be shipped or received by boat to and from New York, Boston or across the Atlantic to Europe. Only the link to Chester was drawn in the first map. The second map, shown in the references section, shows more detail around Chester, including the tracks to Bermuda Hundred.

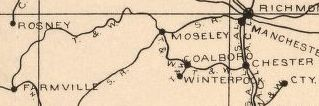
Railway mail map of Virginia cropped to show the Tidewater and Western Railroad.

=== References ===
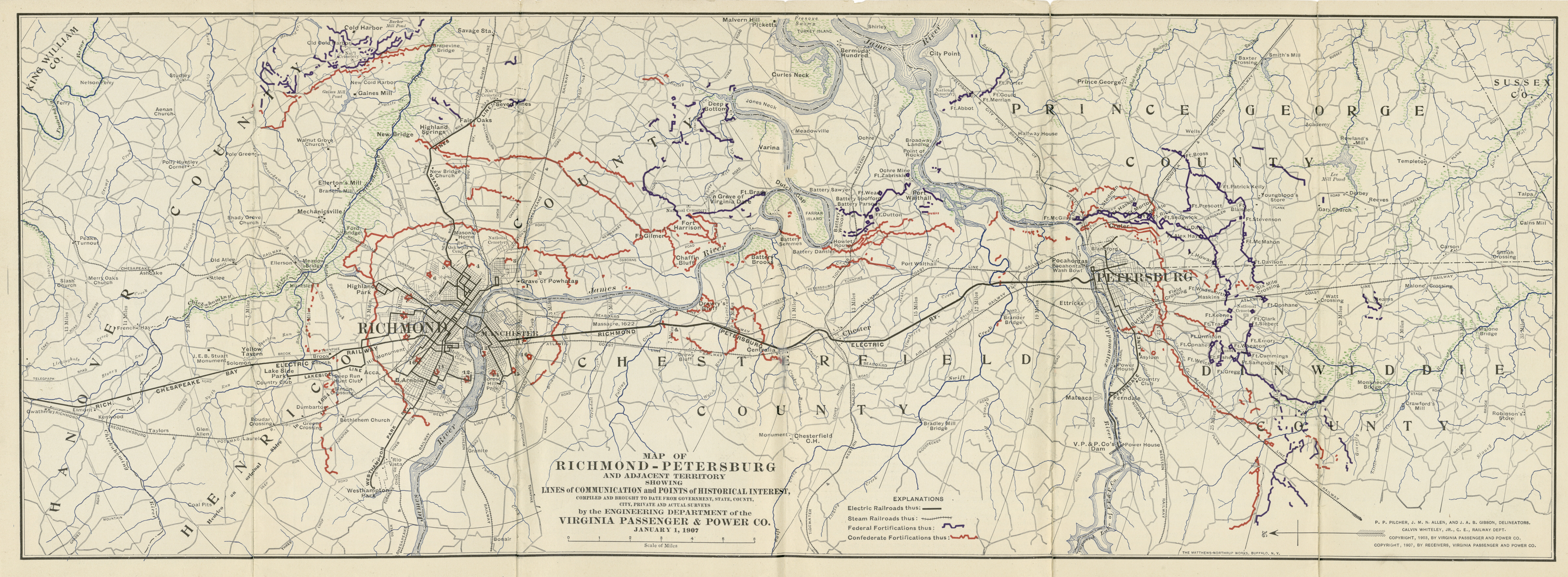
The Tidewater and Western from southern Central Virginia on a Map by Virginia Power Passenger & Power Co that shows the Tidewater and Western tracks going west (up) across Chester to Bermuda Hundred.
