= Farmville and Powhatan Railroad =

Overview
- Headquarters: Richmond, Virginia
- Locale: Chesterfield, Virginia
- Dates of operation: 1884-03-10–1905-06-07
- Successor: Tidewater and Western Railroad

Technical
- Track gauge: 3 ft (914 mm)

Beach Station
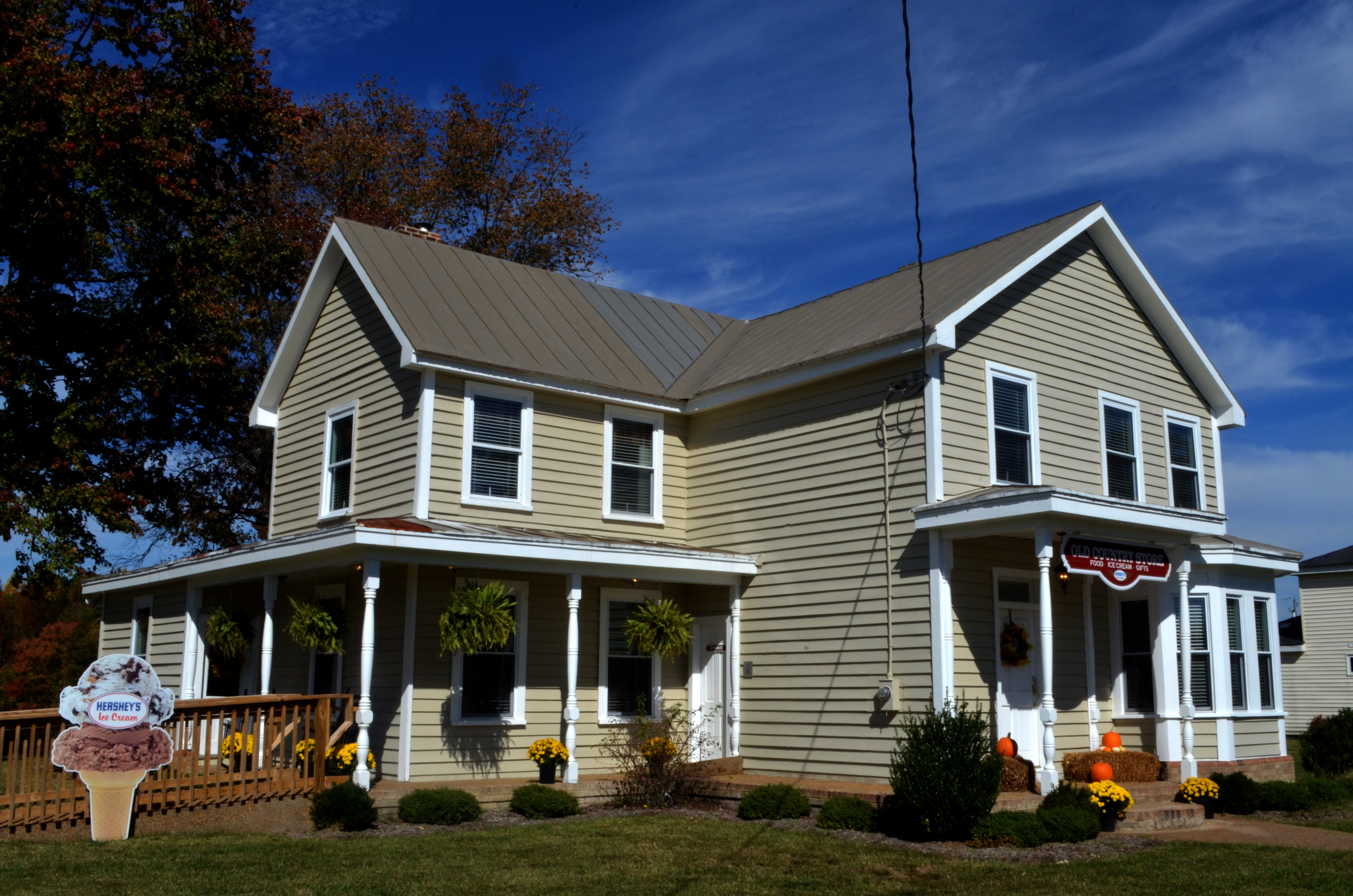
- The Village of Beach Station was built around 1890 was a stop on the Farmville and Powhatan and was opened on the year that the Farmville and Powhatan bought the Brighthope Railway.

General information
- Location: 10410 Beach Road, Chesterfield, VA; U.S.A.
- Owner: George Perdue
- Line: Main
- Distance: 70 miles from Farmville, Va.
- Tracks: 1
- Train operators: Farmville and Powhatan Railroad and Tidewater and Western Railroad

Construction
- Structure type: with a railroad depot, some railroad shanties, a general store and the owner's house.

History
- Opened: c. 1891
- Closed: c. 1905

Services
General Store and Postal mail. Store continued after rails were removed.

U.S. National Register of Historic Places
- Designated: February 22, 2008
- Reference no.: 08000067

Virginia Landmarks Register
- Designated: December 5, 2007
- Reference no.: 020-5386

In 1886, Randolph Harrison, of the Virginia department of Agriculture, cited Cumberland Mining Company, stating that businessmen would soon open a hotel at Lithia Springs, Farmville, VA for people seeking the healing waters. The Brighthope railway would be extended to bring them there. But instead, the Farmville and Powhatan Railroad Company built the narrow gauge rails through Cumberland County and the Farmville and Powhatan Railroad Company bought the Brighthope Railway, so the Farmville and Powhatan Railroad made the connection. In 1890, Beach Station was built with a railroad depot, some railroad shanties, a general store and an owner's house, the George Perdue House as a stop on the line.

== History ==
The Farmville and Powhatan Railroad, a narrow gauge railroad was formed On March 10, 1884, in five years beginning building tracks from Farmville to Cumberland and Powhatan. The Farmville and Powhatan bought the Brighthope Railway in which was in foreclosure on July 23, 1889. On March 3, 1890, the Farmville and Powhatan Railroad was connected to the Brighthope Railway three miles west of Winterpock, taking the eastward part, all but seven miles, of the Brighthope Railway to Bermuda Hundred. After this line was built from Farmville to the Petersburg Area, the Upper Appomattox Canal Navigation System, which took days to make the same journey, would no longer be used.

Trains mostly hauled coal, lumber and then grain and tobacco and other farm products as well as a little furniture. There was one passenger only train and one train with passengers and cargo which each ran Weekdays and Saturday. The trains had five first class passenger cars. The trains carried U.S. Postal mail on two mail, freight and express mail cars. The company had 7 engines and 210 cars in 1890, but only five engines in 1896. The railroad company employed 169 people including over 50 trackmen, who maintained the tracks; 18 who worked at the station as well as carpenters, machinists and other laborers.

In 1891 the train did not always stop but a railroad car, although not a Railway post office, on the Farmville and Powhatan Railroad, dropped off and picked up mail using the Mail on-the-fly technique at Moseley and Skinquater. This was a hook and pouch system that let the train drop off and pick up mail without slowing down.

Postal Telegraph Company operated the telegraph over the rails and charged customers for telegraphs.

== Stations ==
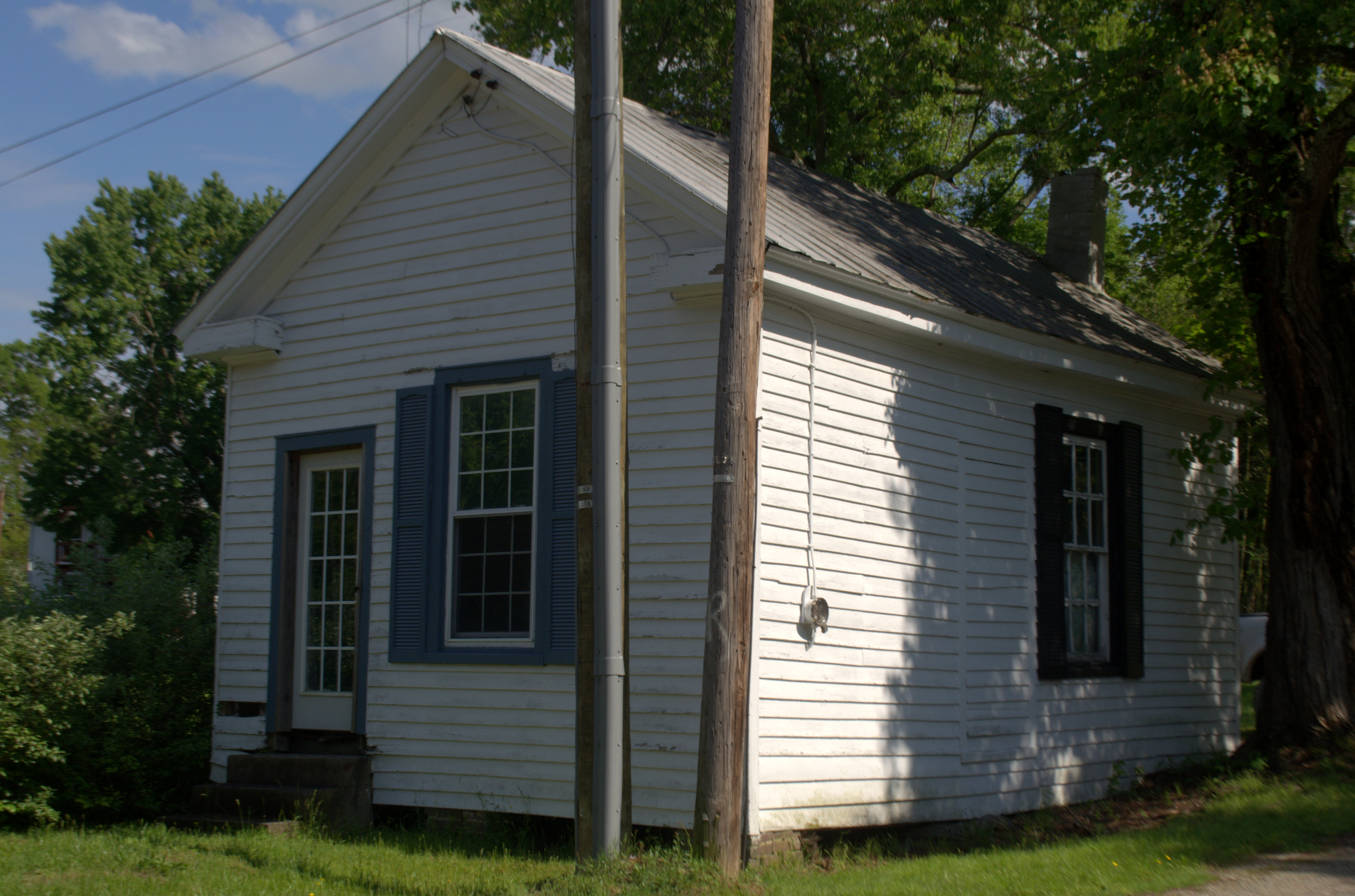
Moseley Junction 1891 Post Office which had a Closed-pouch Mail system with the train.

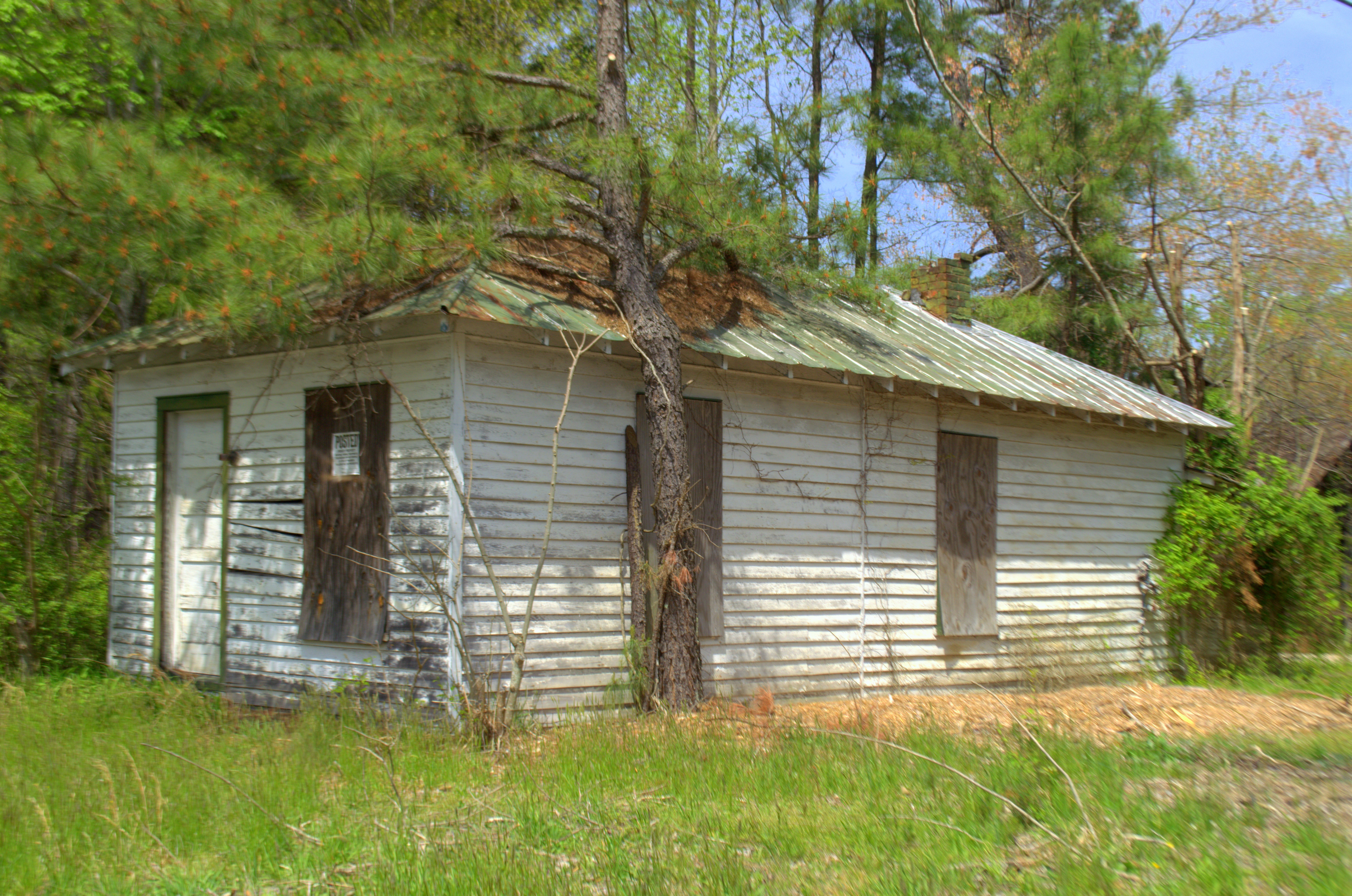
The Purdue Station on the Brighthope Railway shown here in 2016 at 12702 Beach Road in Chesterfield, Virginia

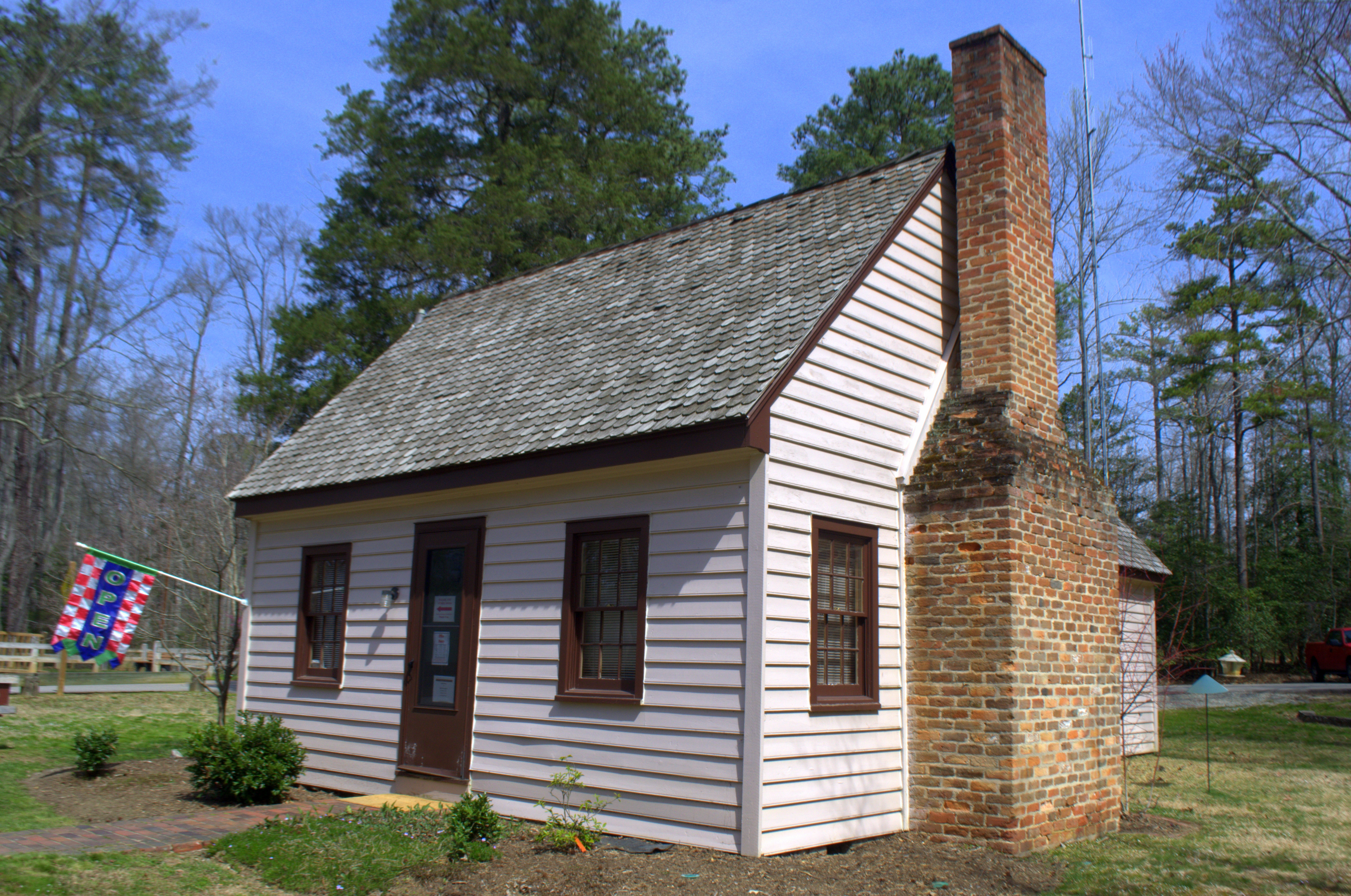
Fendley Station remodeled into a Park Office

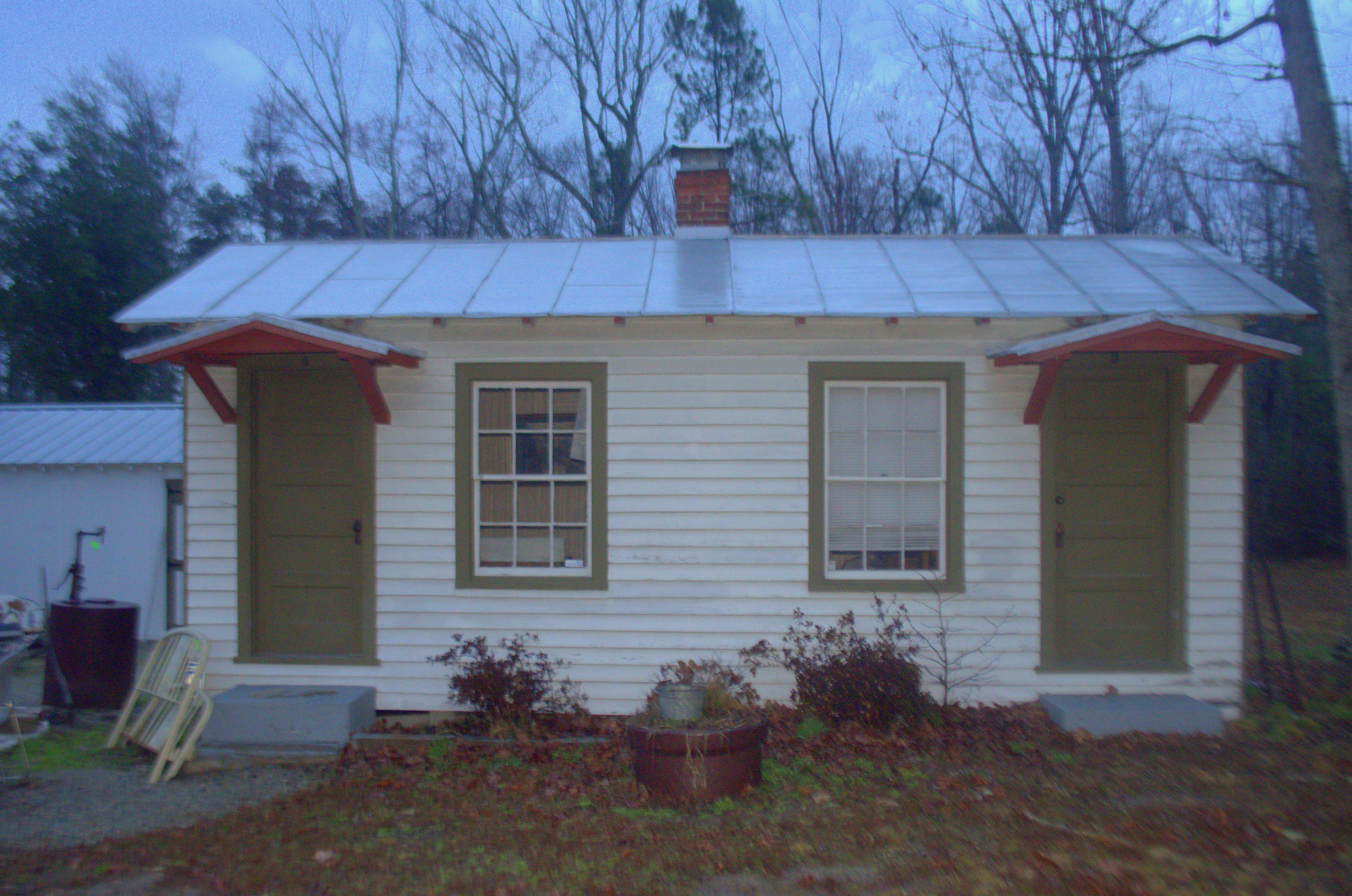
Skinquarter Train Depot on the Farmville and Powhatan Railroad in 1891

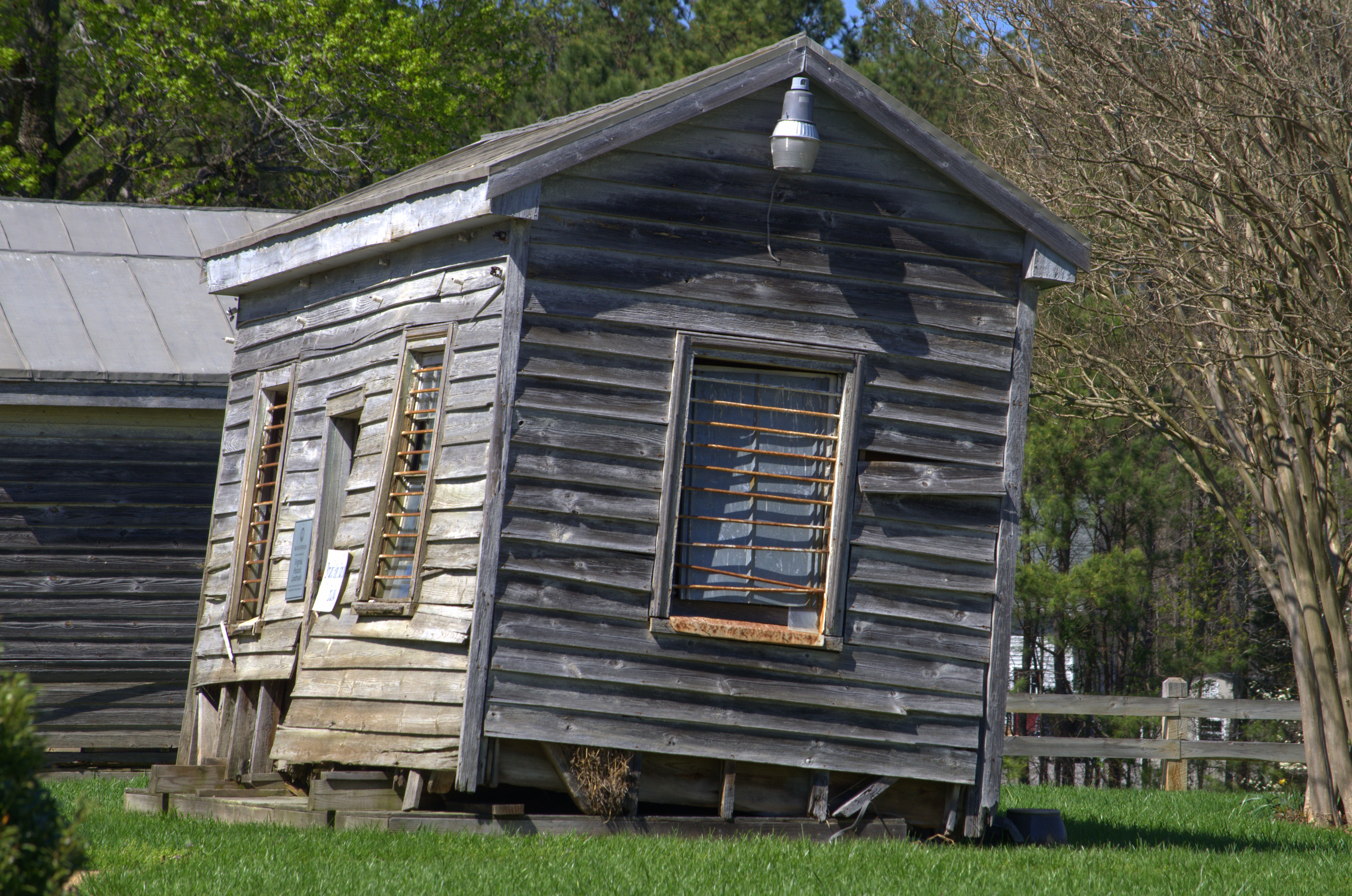
Railroad Depot, Beach Station, Chesterfield, Virginia.

The Farmville and Powhatan was a ninety three mile line after the merger. The rails had one bridge over the Atlantic Coast Line Railroad and the Swift Creek Rail Bridge.

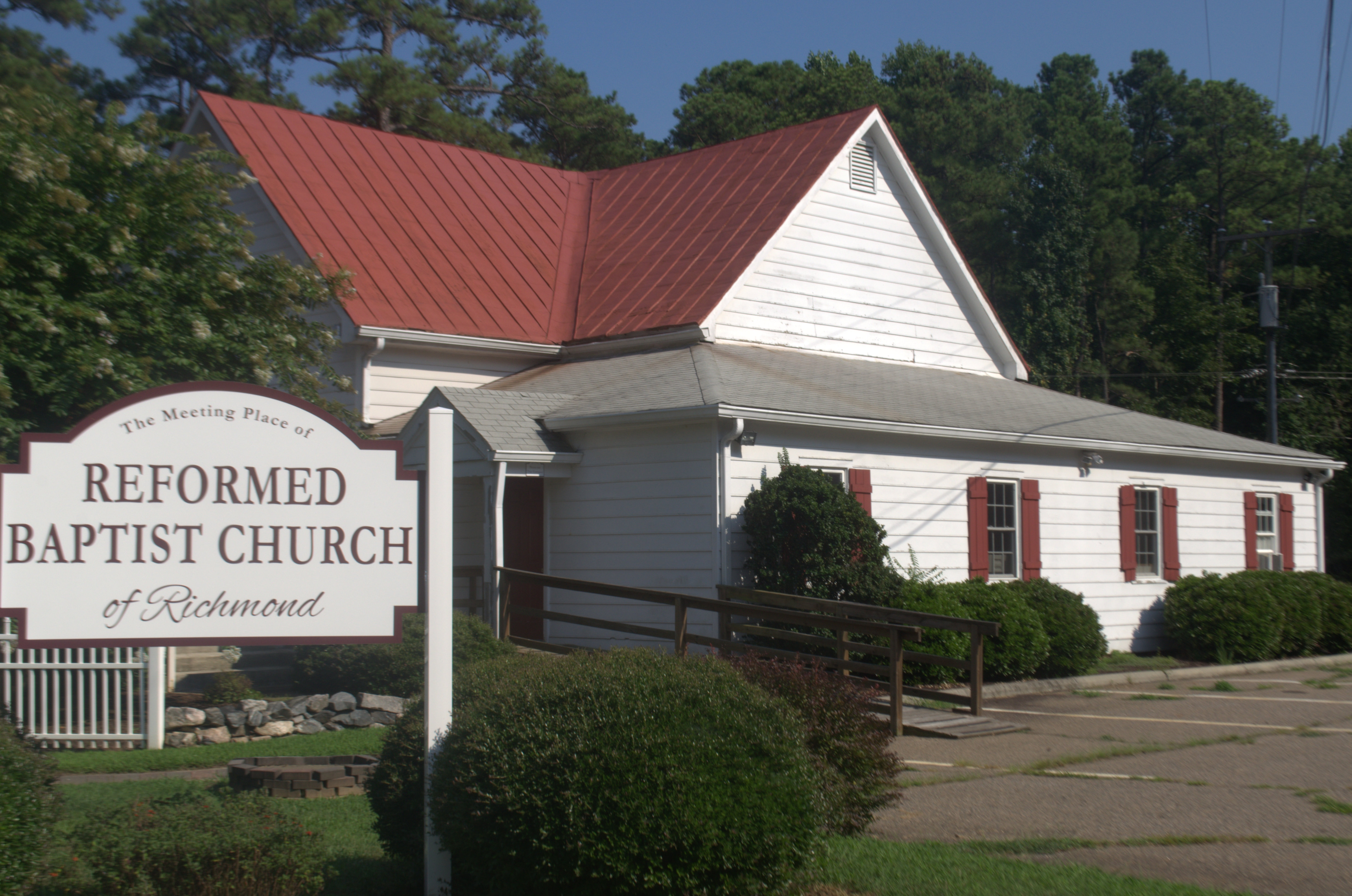
Reformed Baptist Church of Richmond in Winterpock since 1825, across from the train stop

  - Farmville
  - Farmville Junction, with the Southern Railway.
  - Raine's, Raines Tavern had a spur line built to the Piedmont Mines near Farmville.
  - Fork, possibly road to Fork Swamp area in the Willis River.
  - Eulalie, possibly a French Dairy near Bet Terrace.
  - McRae
  - Cumberland;
  - Gray's. They were owners of Northfield Plantation, Cumberland, Virginia, at this stop, the Junction with Northfield road, former Virginia State Route 45 northward.
  - Sunnyside
  - Tobaccoville
  - Ballsville
  - Macon
  - Powhatan
  - Negro Arm: Academy Rd was once called Negro Arm Road and intersects Old Buckingham Road just east of Powhatan and before the Red Lane Tavern.
  - Flat Rock
    - Phaup: a spur line off of Moseley's Junction;
  - Moseley’s Junction: 1919 Mosley Rd where passengers could connect with the Southern Railway.
  - Skinquarter
    - Coalboro: A spur line off of Winterpock.
  - West SW of Winterpock Bridge
  - Winterpock
  - Summit, possibly Crump's Store on Beach Rd.
  - Perdue, now 12702 Beach Road.
  - Beach: 70 Miles from Farmville.
  - Fendley; a Water Station, where the steam locomotive could get water needed to make steam, was moved a few miles in modern times to become the office of Pocahontas State Park.
  - Nash: Now Nash Road
  - Chester Office
    - A.C.L. Depot (Atlantic Coast Line Depot) a railroad depot on the Atlantic Coast Line Railroad which merged with the Richmond and Petersburg Railroad. A spur line off of the Chester station to the Depot.
  - R & P Electric Railway, the Chester Stop of world's first electric Trolley which ran from Richmond to Petersburg.
  - Ochre; a former town named Ochre, site of Bermuda Ochre Company on a road to an ochre mine that also contained hematite next to Point of Rocks, that supplied two thirds of the yellow ochre and Venetian red pigment in the United States in the late nineteenth century.
  - Bermuda Warehouse where coal could be loaded onto ships.

== Passenger travel ==
=== An uncomfortable ride ===
A passenger from Powhatan Courthouse complained of the discontinuation of the early train of the F & P, that connected in Moseley with the Southern Railway, on the old Richmond and Danville Railroad rails. This forced him to take an uncomfortable ride on the F & P to Chester which took longer each morning. The railroad replied that they needed to have trains that were full the entire route, starting no earlier than 5:50 in Farmville for people who had to walk a few miles to reach the train station. His train that had connected to the Southern had started at 4:50 A.M. in Farmville so had very few passengers in the beginning of the run.

=== Stop anywhere ===
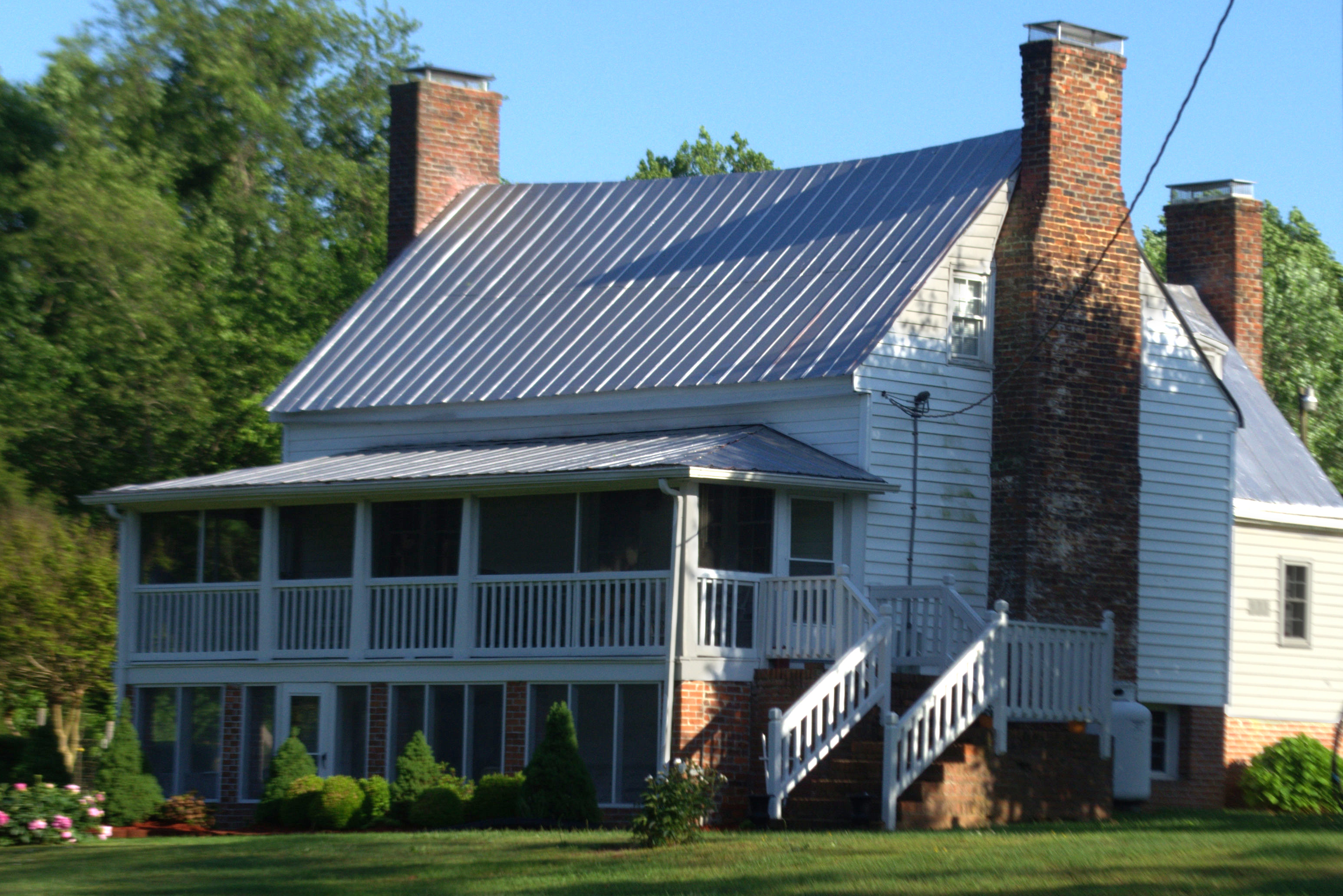
Red Lane Tavern

Train operators running the passenger train would "Stop Anywhere" to pick up passengers. Red Lane Tavern was a common stop for the passenger train that was not listed on the schedule.

=== Fowlkes v. the Southern Railroad Co. ===
Mrs. Eva C. Fowlkes, on March 9, 1899, purchased a ticket on the Southern Railway from Richmond to Mosley Junction to connect to Skinquarter by way of the Farmville and Powhatan. The railroad ticket master had misinformed her and there was no connection that day. She did not see the small new Farmville and Powhatan ticket office in Mosley Junction and hired wagon to take her to her parents house in Skinquarter, Virginia. As she was pregnant, she had a miscarriage after the wagon ride which resulted in a lawsuit, Folkes v. the Southern Railway Co. in which the railroad was liable for only $150, the court ruled that the railroad attendant could not predict the events that would happen after the misinformation was given.

== Modern pathway ==
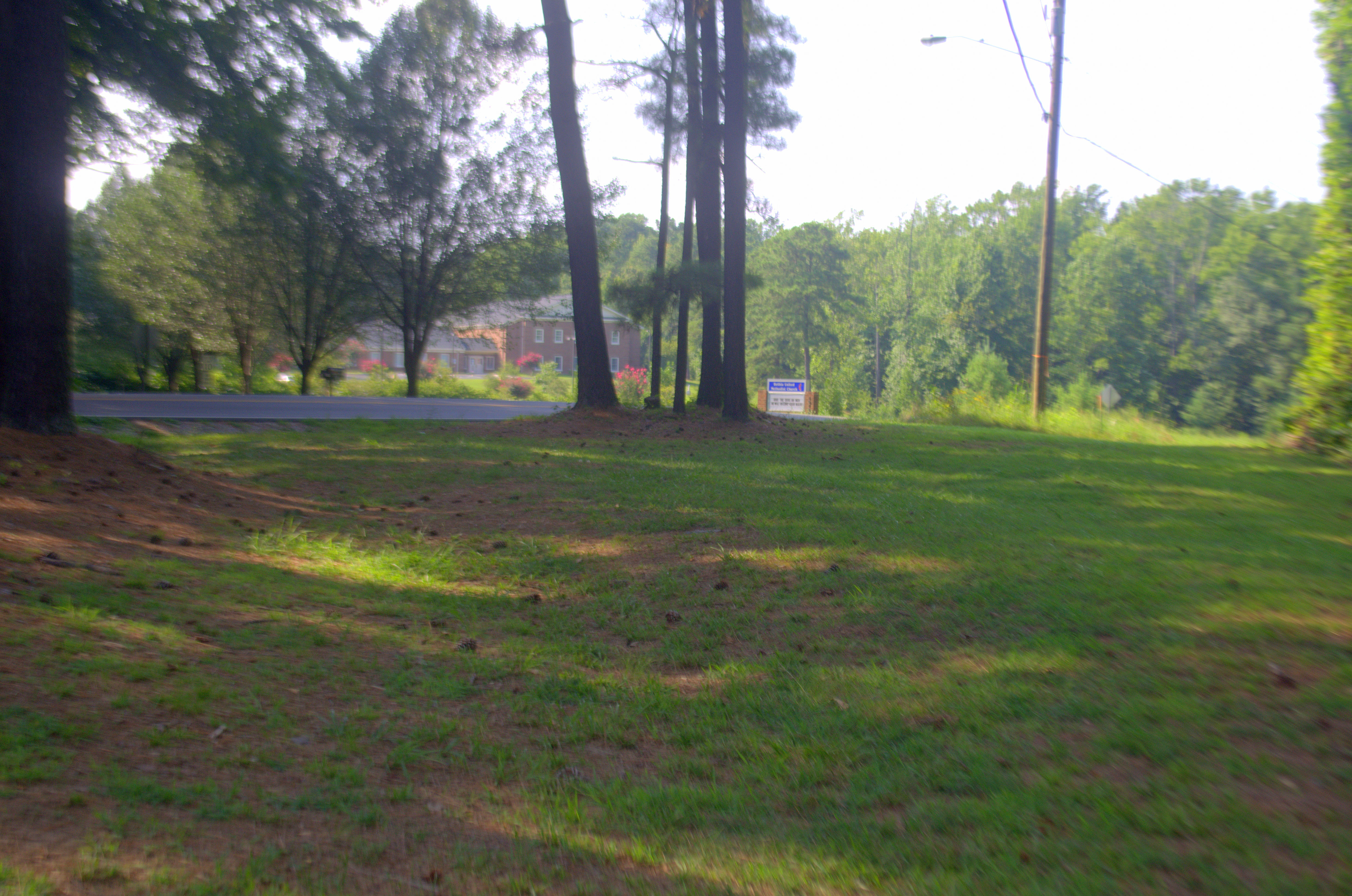
This is the Railroad Bed of the, Farmville and Powhatan Railroad at Winterpock, Virginia on Beach Road.

Following the path of the old railroad today travels down Virginia State Route 10 from Bermuda Hundred on the north side of the Appomattox River and then east on Carver Heights Drive, Chester, through a landfill and housing complex, next to Bright Hope Road then along Beach Road to Winterpock, then one spur lead down where South on Coalboro Rd is today. The main line led from Winterpock to Skinquarter up Local route 603 or Beaver Bridge Rd. Past Skinquarter it continued on 603 to 605 and up 605 which becomes Mosley Rd where it crossed the Southern Railway. It continued on 605 to 622 and up 622 to Flat Rock. From Flat Rock it followed near State Rt 60 to Powhatan where it then took Route 13 or Old Buckingham Road all the way to Cumberland, Virginia. From Cumberland it followed what is now Virginia State Route 45 to Farmville. Most of the stops are still towns today, even if only a sign and a few stores.

== Location ==
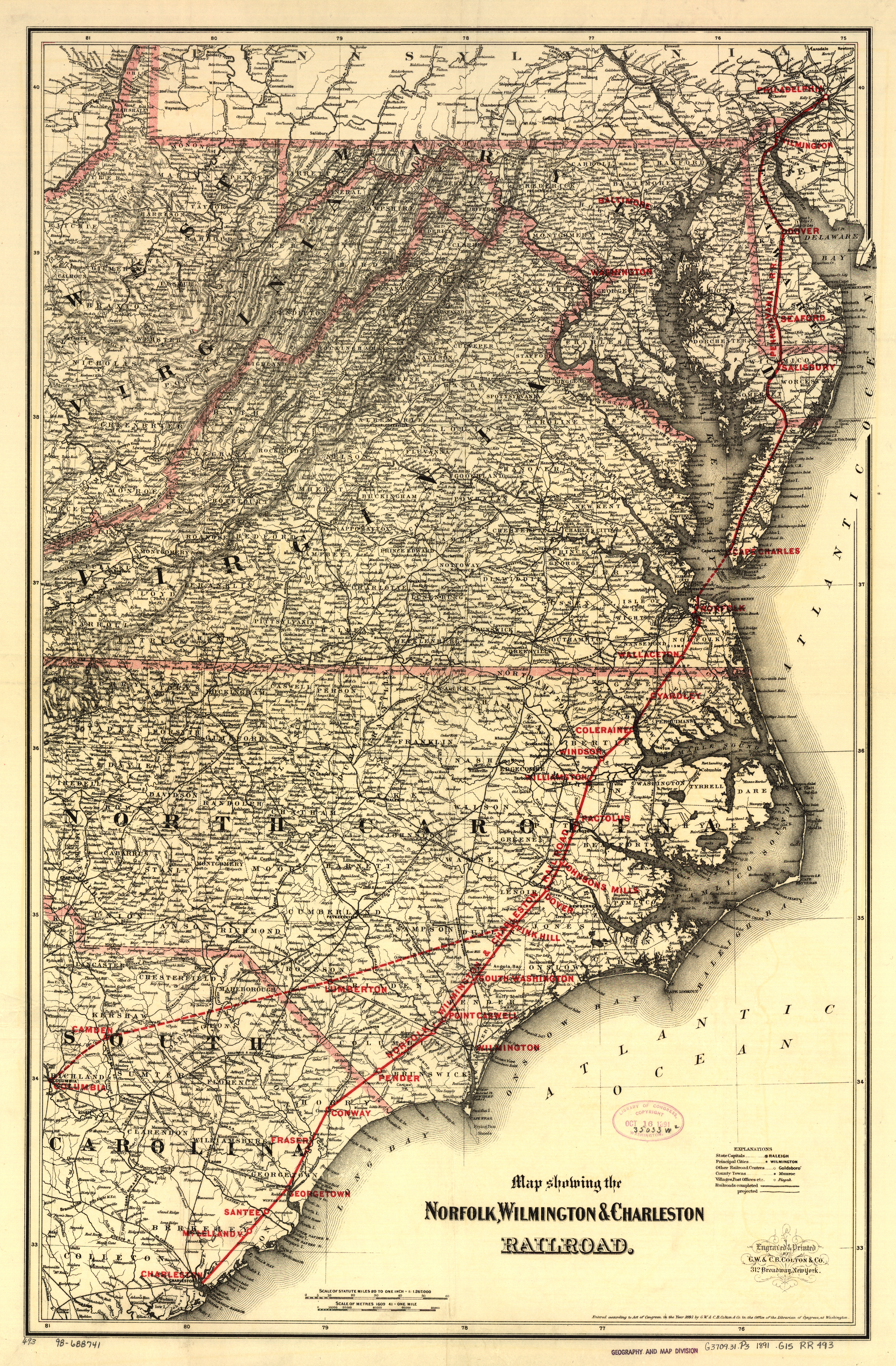
The Farmville and Powhatan Railroad shown in southern Central Virginia on a Map by G.W. & C.B. Colton & Co. of the Norfolk, Wilmington, and Charleston Railroad in 1891.
