= Uncle John Scruggs =

- Birth name: John H. Scruggs
- Born: May 1855; Buckingham County, Virginia, U.S.
- Died: March 5, 1941 (aged 85); Macon, Virginia, U.S.
- Occupation: Musician
- Instrument: Banjo
- Years active: 1920s - 1930s

John H. Scruggs (May 1855 – 5 March 1941), known as Uncle John Scruggs, was an African American banjo player who attracted attention for his singing and playing during the 1920s and '30s.

== Career ==
Scruggs was born to slave parents Henry and Betsey Scruggs in 1855, in Buckingham County, Virginia, where he spent almost his entire life. A film exists of him performing the folk ballad “Little Log Cabin Round the Lane” in a minstrel style. The footage was taken by the Fox Movietone News on November 8, 1928, in Powhatan, Virginia. John Scruggs played 5-string banjo in the traditional clawhammer style. There are no other known recordings of his music. He died in Macon, Virginia in 1941 at the age of 85.

Uncle John appears in a mural called "All in the Family II", which is displayed at the Sherrod Library at East Tennessee State University. John Scruggs is pictured between Bill Monroe, "the Father of bluegrass music", and Earl Scruggs, who popularized his own style the 5-string banjo picking in the 20th century. The mural displays the important role that African-American musicians have played in the evolution of American music. It shows also that racially diverse musicians are all members of the same family.
