= Flat Rock, Virginia =

Unincorporated community in Virginia, US

Coordinates: 37.5226°N 77.8233°W

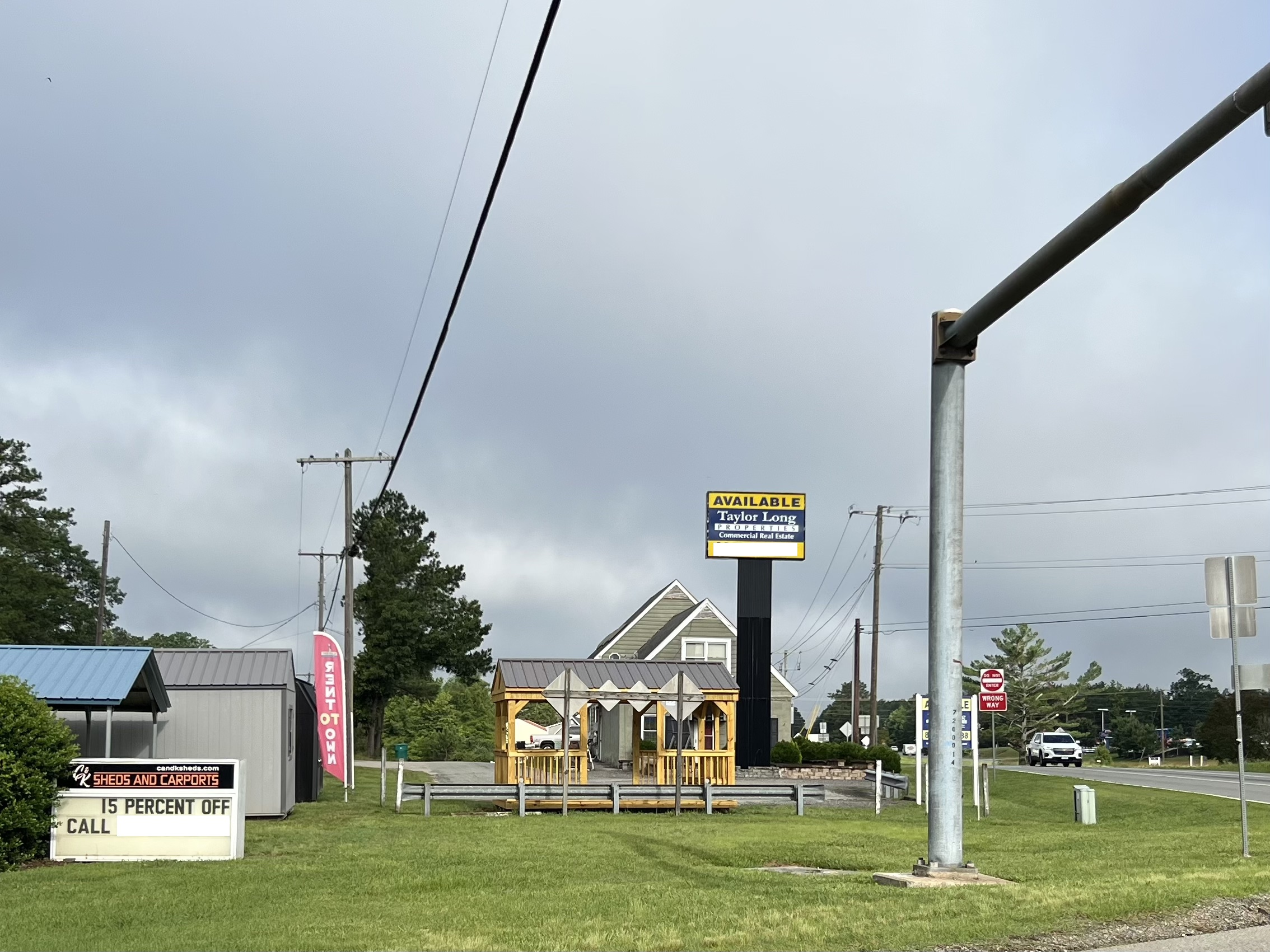

Flat Rock is an unincorporated community in Powhatan County, in the U.S. state of Virginia. Flatrock was a stop on the Farmville and Powhatan Railroad from 1884 to 1905 and then on the Tidewater and Western Railroad from 1905 to 1917.
