= Raines Tavern, Virginia =

Unincorporated community in Virginia, United States

Coordinates: 37°22′01″N 78°22′29″W

Farmville Coal and Iron Company
- Company type: Private
- Industry: Coal
- Founded: (1881)
- Defunct
- Headquarters: Farmville, Virginia
- Area served: Farmville

Raines Tavern is an unincorporated community in Cumberland County on Virginia State Route 45 just north of Farmville in the U.S. state of Virginia. It was a stop on the Farmville and Powhatan Railroad from 1884 to 1905, and on the Tidewater and Western Railroad from 1905 to 1917.

The Virginia General Assembly chartered the Piedmont Coal Company for John Dalby in 1860. The coal field was idle until 1891 when the Farmville Coal and Iron Company began leasing land, selling stock, and reopened the Piedmont mines. The Farmville Coal and Iron Company built a one-and-a-half mile spur rail line from the Farmville and Powhatan Railroad to the mine at Rains Tavern. This railroad provided transport from the mine to the docks at Bermuda Hundred in the Tidewater region.
