= Skinquarter, Virginia =

Coordinates: 37.399°N 77.783°W

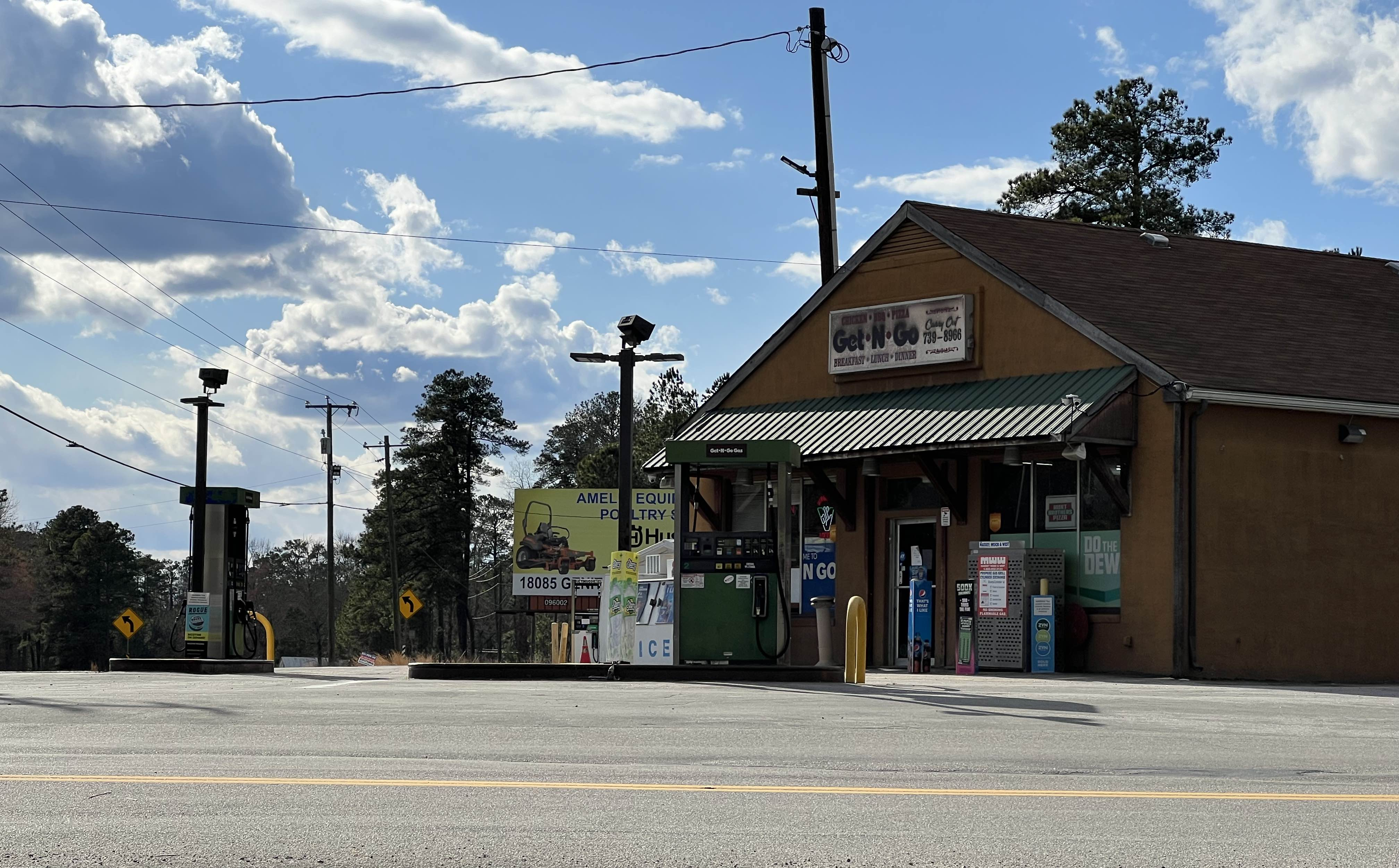
Store in Skinquarter, Virginia.

Skinquarter is an unincorporated town located off U.S. Route 360 in the western part of Chesterfield County in Virginia. It is located on the headwaters off Goode's Creek and Skinquarter Creek which flow to different places on the Appomattox River.

The town was named by the early settlers for a spring nearby where the Native Americans would skin and quarter (chop into four pieces) deer. The Baptist Church that bears the name "Skinquarter" was founded in 1778. The first building was close to the spring. The present church building is the third or fourth building to be occupied by the church but it has kept the name Skinquarter continuously.

It was a stop on the Farmville and Powhatan Railroad from 1884 to 1905 and then on the Tidewater and Western Railroad from 1905 to 1917. In 1926, a few years after the railroad was sold, a gas station for automobiles and store, Skinquarter Market, was built here, near the site of the Railroad Station that was about 1/4 mile up what is now Skinquarter Road.

In 1891 the train did not always stop but a railway post office, a mail car on the Farmville and Powhatan, dropped off and picked up mail using the Mail on-the-fly technique. This was a hook and pouch system that let the train drop off and pick up mail without slowing down.
