= Tobaccoville, Virginia =

Tobaccoville
- Unincorporated community
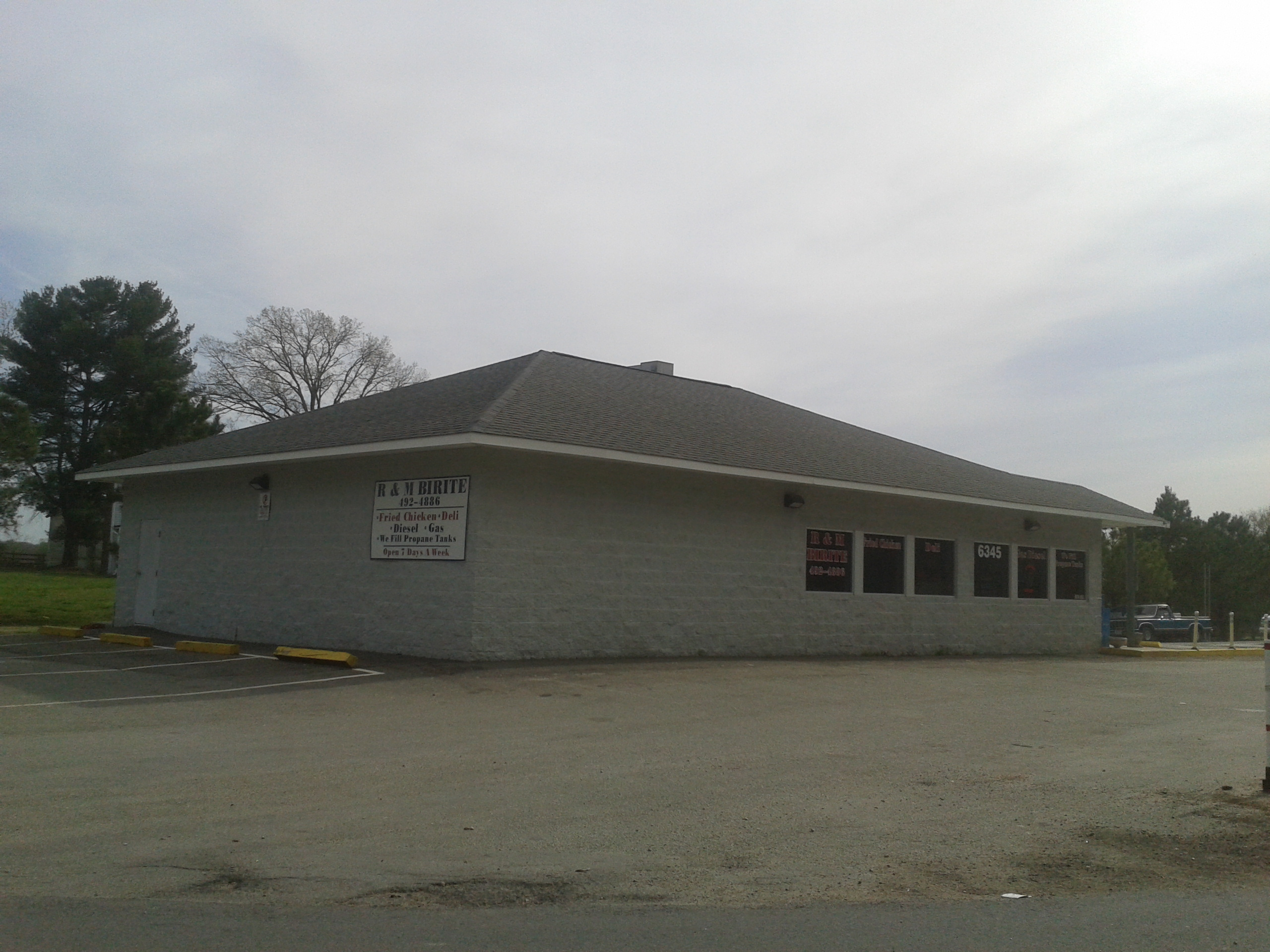
- General store, Tobaccoville

- Location within the state of Virginia Tobaccoville (the United States)
- Coordinates: 37°28′57″N 78°05′45″W
- Country: United States
- State: Virginia
- County: Powhatan
- Time zone: UTC−5 (Eastern (EST))
  - Summer (DST): UTC−4 (EDT)
- GNIS feature ID: 1477815

Tobaccoville is an unincorporated community in Powhatan County, Virginia. Tobaccoville was a stop on the Farmville and Powhatan Railroad from 1884 to 1905 and then on the Tidewater and Western Railroad from 1905 to 1917. A magazine notice for renting the "Indian Camp" farm advertised that the farm was near the Tobaccoville station of the Tidewater and Western Railroad. This would help the tenant farmer get dairy products to market.
