= Moseley, Virginia =

Unincorporated community in Virginia, United States

- Unincorporated community
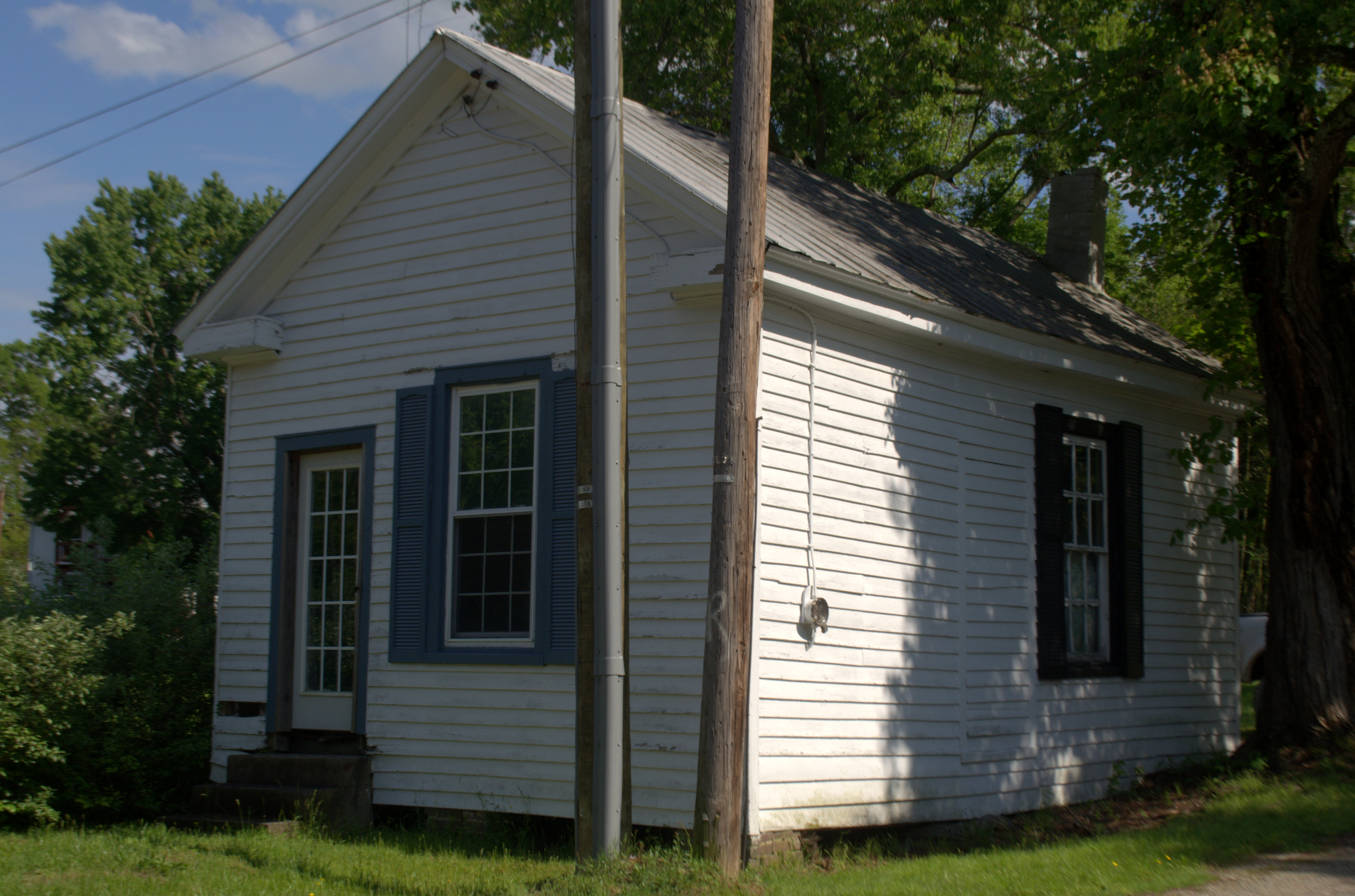
- The 1891 Moseley Post Office on Moseley Road

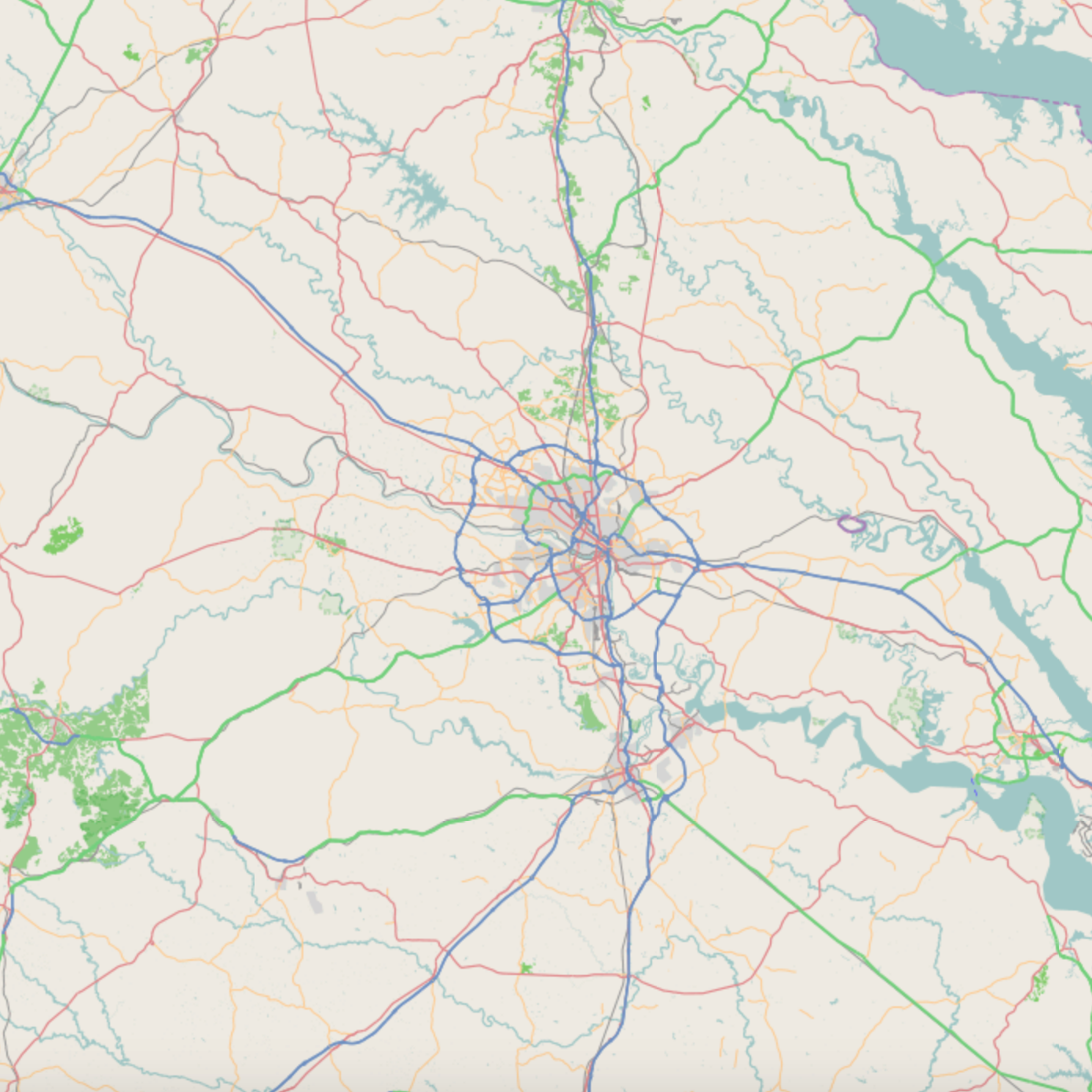
- Location within the state of Virginia Moseley (Virginia) Moseley (the United States)
- Coordinates: 37°28′31″N 77°46′44″W
- Country: United States
- State: Virginia
- Counties: Powhatan, Chesterfield
- Time zone: UTC−5 (Eastern (EST))
  - Summer (DST): UTC−4 (EDT)
- ZIP code: 23120
- Area code: 804

Moseley is an unincorporated area in Powhatan and Chesterfield counties in the U.S. state of Virginia. It is located to the west of the metropolitan Richmond area.

The United States Post Office for the community is located at 21431 Hull Street Road, with a ZIP code of 23120.

The community still has farms, some of which have established tourist activities such as pick-your-own-fruits and -vegetables and seasonal events. The privately owned Metro Richmond Zoo is located here and has operated year round on its 70-acre facility since 1995. (It was closed for a period during the early stages of the COVID-19 pandemic.)

Many upper-middle class communities have been built in this formerly rural area since the late 20th century, such as Magnolia Green, Summer Lake, Westerleigh and FoxFire. It is bordered to the east by the census-designated place of Woodlake.

== History ==
The community was named for William Moseley, a major landowner who donated property in the late 19th century for a railroad station. It developed as a stop on the Farmville and Powhatan Railroad from 1891 to 1905, and then on the Tidewater and Western Railroad from 1905 to 1917. It was also a stop on the Richmond and Danville Railroad, which was renamed as the Southern Railway (U.S.). It was absorbed by the Norfolk Southern Railway in 1982, which no longer stops in Moseley.

The 1891 Moseley Post Office on Moseley Road was damaged in 2025 by a falling tree. Most of the building has since collapsed and been removed.

In the late 1800s some people would transfer between the two railroads here, although they had separate stations.

In 1891 the train did not always stop. Staff used a railroad car on the Farmville and Powhatan Railroad, to drop off and pick up mail using the Mail on-the-fly technique. (This car was not designated as a railway post office. This hook and pouch system allowed crew on the train to drop off and pick up mail without the train slowing.

The area was long devoted to agriculture. In the colonial period, tobacco was a commodity crop, a labor-intensive crop that planters cultivated and processed with the use of enslaved African-American workers. Soils became exhausted and mixed crops were introduced in the late 18th and 19th centuries.

In addition to large lot suburban development, it is the site of the privately-owned Metro Richmond Zoo.
