= McRae, Virginia =

Unincorporated community in Virginia, US

Coordinates: 37°27′41″N 78°16′57″W

McRae is an unincorporated community in Cumberland County, in the U.S. state of Virginia. McRae was a stop on the Farmville and Powhatan Railroad from 1884 to 1905 and then on the Tidewater and Western Railroad from 1905 to 1917. It is on the new Virginia State Route 45 between Cumberland and Farmville today.
