= Beach Station (Chesterfield, Virginia) =

- U.S. National Register of Historic Places
- U.S. Historic district
- Virginia Landmarks Register
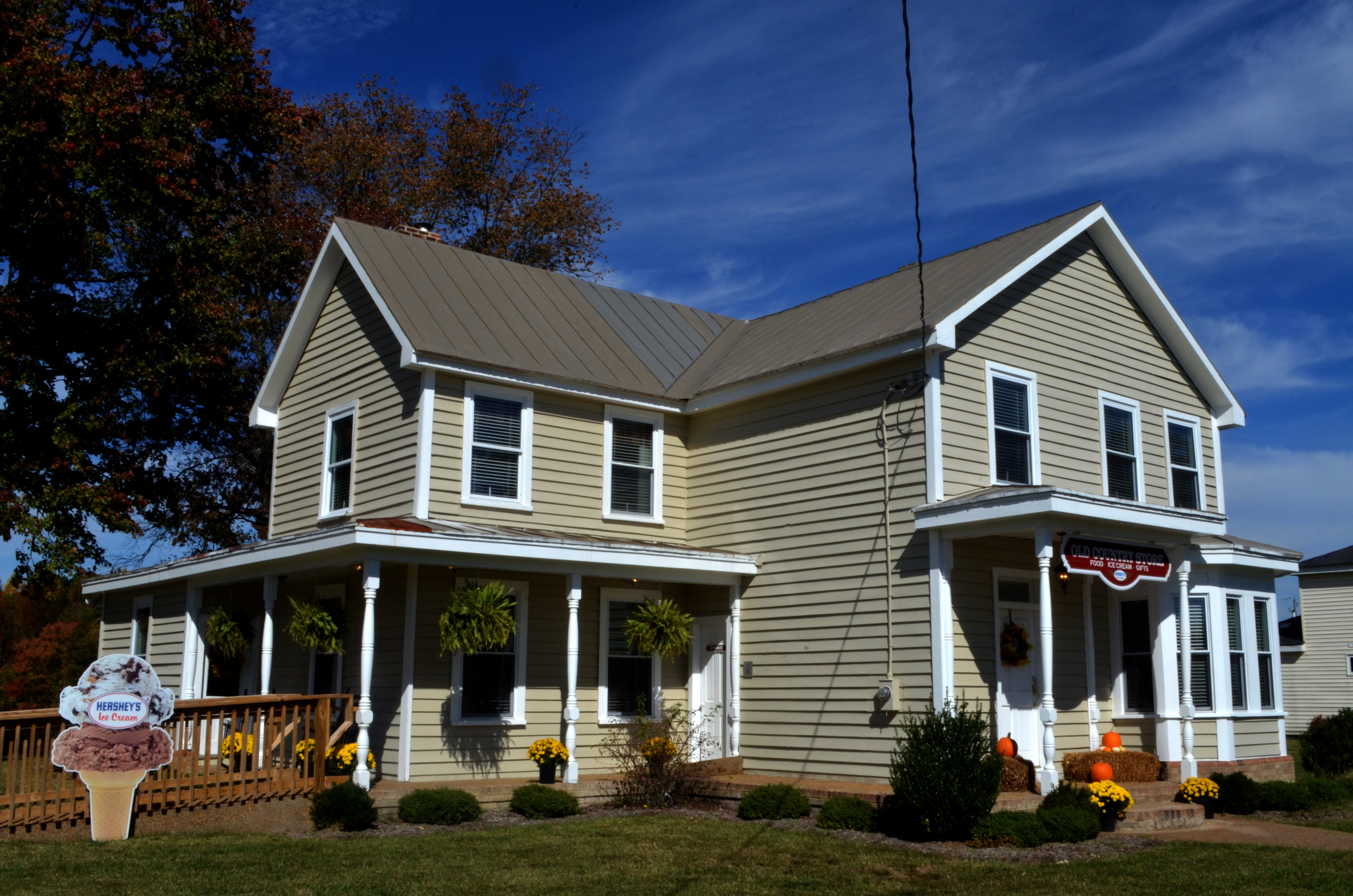
- George Perdue House at Beach Station Historic District, October 2012

- Location within Virginia Location within the United States
- Location: 11410 & 11400 Beach Rd., Chesterfield, Virginia
- Coordinates: 37°21′20″N 77°35′42″W
- Area: 0.8 acres (0.32 ha)
- Built: c. 1890
- Built by: Perdue, Nathaniel B.; Perdue, George Porter
- NRHP reference No.: 08000067
- VLR No.: 020-5386

Significant dates
- Added to NRHP: February 22, 2008
- Boundary decrease: March 24, 2010
- Designated VLR: December 5, 2007

Beach Station a national historic district located near Chesterfield, in Chesterfield County, Virginia. The district includes six contributing buildings and one contributing site in the Village of Beach. They were all constructed about 1890 and are two single-family dwellings, a post office, a railway depot, an outbuilding, two railroad shanties, and the ruins of the former general store. Beach Station was accessible from the Farmville and Powhatan Railroad later named the Tidewater and Western Railroad. Leasing arrangements had been made with the Brighthope Railway company which was sold to become the Farmville and Powhatan. The district represents an unusual collection of late-nineteenth-century buildings in their historic surroundings. It was listed on the National Register of Historic Places in 2008.

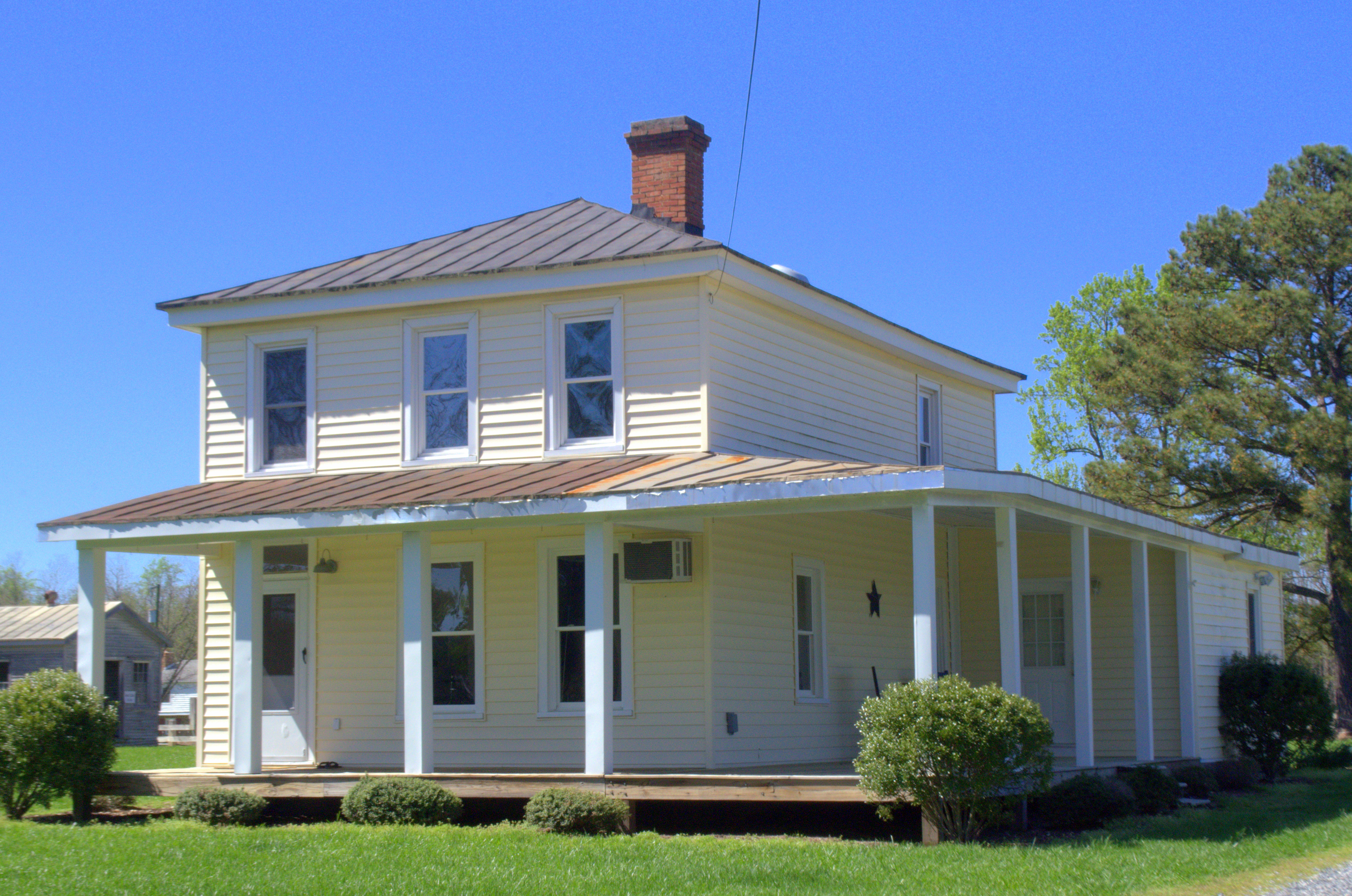
Perdue-Mitchell House, Beach Station, Chesterfield, Virginia

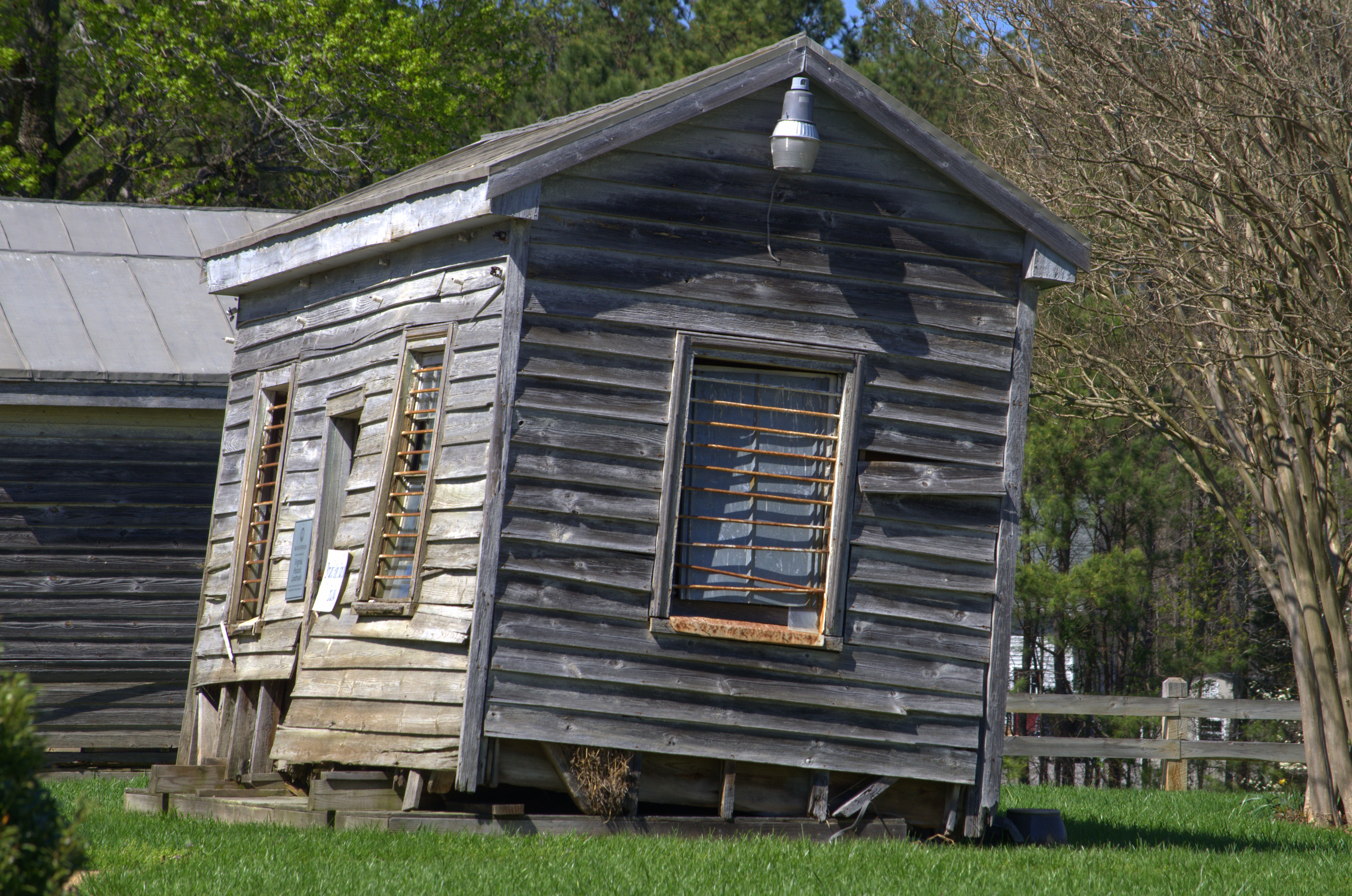
Railroad Depot, Beach Station, Chesterfield, Virginia. This was a railroad station on the Bright Hope Railroad.
