= Swift Creek Rail Bridge =

Railroad Bridge over Swift Creek
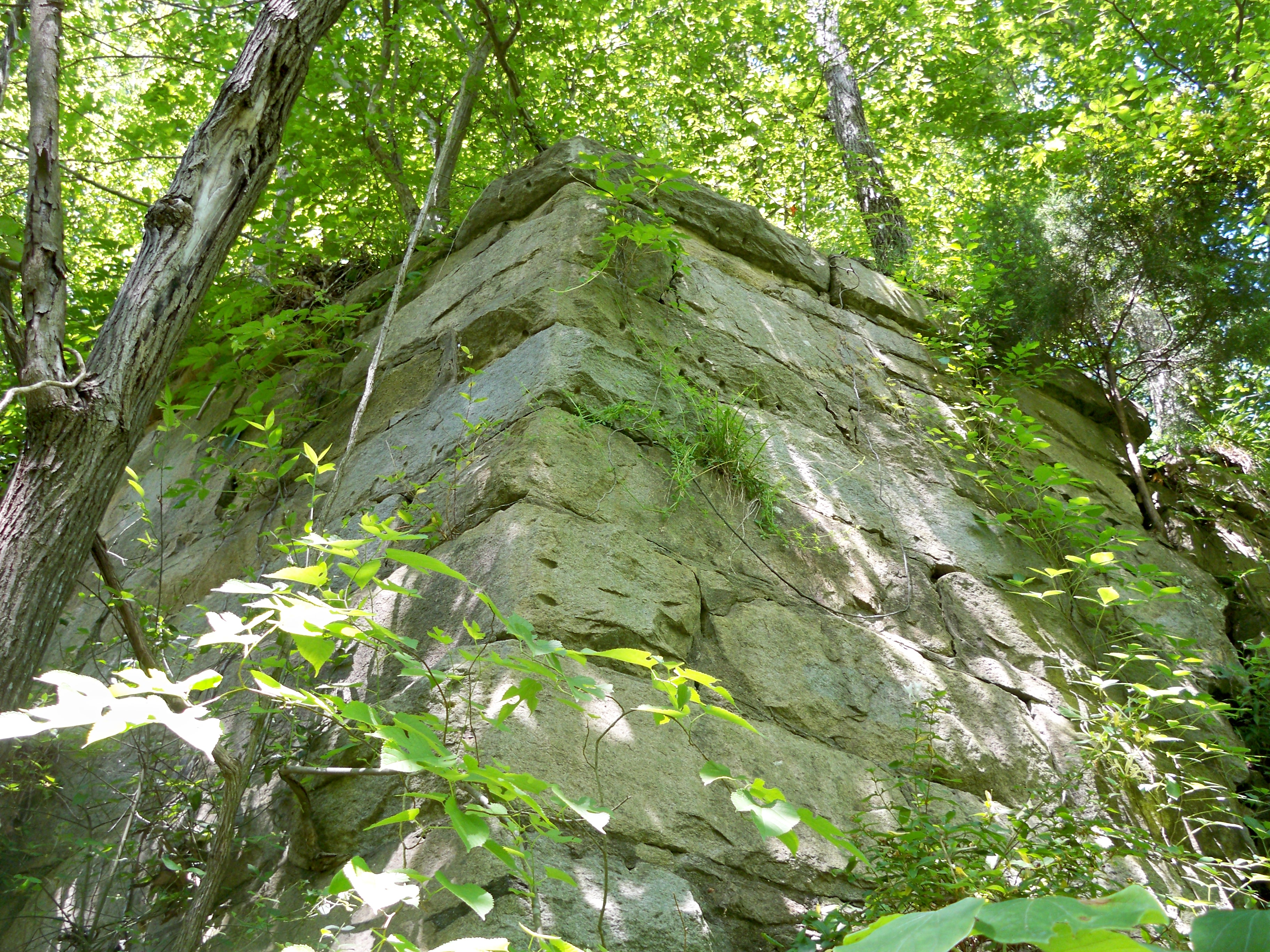
- Western Abutment of the Bright Hope Railroad Bridge over Swift Creek
- Coordinates: 37.3502°N 77.5113°W
- Carries: Steam locomotive
- Crosses: Swift Creek (Virginia)
- Locale: Chesterfield County, Virginia
- Owner: Clover Hill Railroad, Brighthope Railway, Farmville and Powhatan Railroad, and then Tidewater and Western Railroad

Characteristics
- Design: Truss bridge
- Material: Granite
- Total length: 30 ft.
- Width: 20 ft.
- No. of spans: 1
- No. of lanes: 1

Rail characteristics
- Track gauge: Standard, 3 ft (914 mm) after 1881

History
- Construction end: c.1841
- Closed: 1917

Statistics
- Daily traffic: 2 Passenger or passenger and freight trains each way six days a week. Up to six coal trains each way daily.

Location
- Interactive map of Railroad Bridge over Swift Creek

The Swift Creek Rail Bridge was a granite and iron truss bridge over Swift Creek in Virginia. The Tidewater and Western Railroad included a bridge over Swift Creek that had been built by an earlier railroad company, the Clover Hill Railroad. The bridge was used during the whole time the four railroad companies operated rails over the bridge. The metal on the bridge was sold as part of foreclosure of the final company in 1917.

== Geography and settings ==
The Swift Creek Rail Bridge in Chesterfield County crossed Swift Creek, one of the two major creeks in the county. The Bridge crossed the creek, east of Carver Heights Drive, Chester, past a landfill and behind a housing complex west of Bright Hope Road, which is near Beach Road. The creek is narrow, because this point is west, upstream, of the fall line and the creek is not tidal here.

== Architecture ==
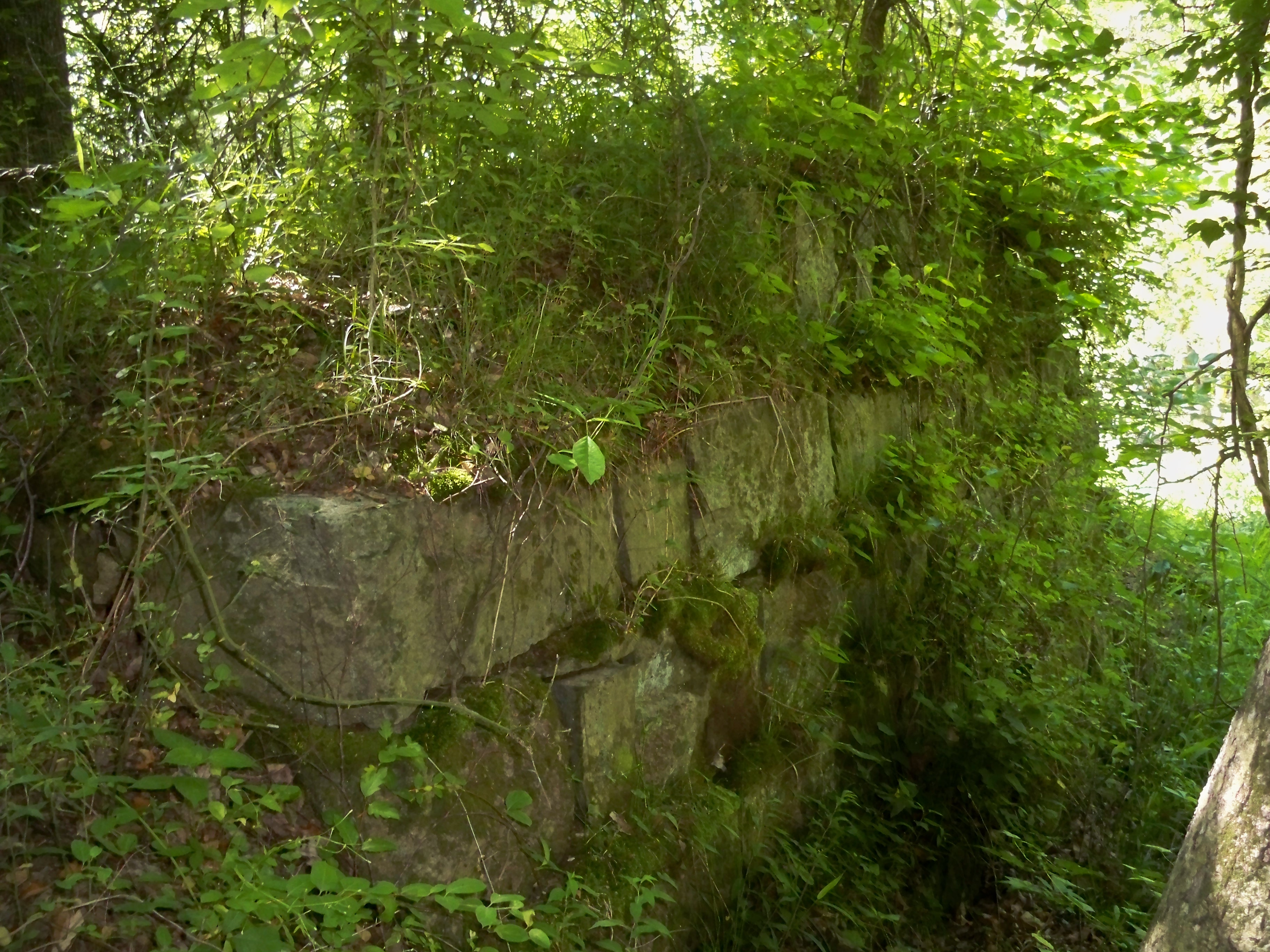
Eastern Abutment of the Bright Hope Railroad Bridge over Swift Creek

The remains of the bridge are granite abutments that are twenty feet wide indicating that it was a Truss Bridge. The bridge was one thirty foot span. The abutments were made of granite that was mined using star drills as shown by the drill holes. The Petersburg granite is readily available in the area.

== History ==
The Swift Creek Rail Bridge was owned by four railroads.

=== Clover Hill Railroad ===
The bridge was constructed for the Clover Hill Railroad and Mining Company to get coal trains over Swift Creek in 1841. The tracks were standard gauge at that time. The State of Virginia declared this bridge sound in 1878.

=== Brighthope Railway ===
The Brighthope Railway bought the Clover Hill in bankruptcy and became the new owners of the bridge in 1877. The new owners increased passenger travel. In, 1881, the Brighthope owners converted the gauge to narrow gauge.

=== Farmville and Powhatan Railroad ===
The Farmville and Powhatan Railroad became the new owners in 1884. The Farmville and Powhatan allowed a telegraph to be added to the rails, which would have had a powered telegraph line across the bridge.

=== Tidewater and Western Railroad ===
The Tidewater and Western Railroad bought the bankrupt Farmville and Powhatan in 1905 and went bankrupt themselves in 1917. Creditors sold the rails and other assets to the World War One Effort in France. Only the granite abutments remain today. Another bridge takes Beach Road across Swift Creek. A residential road named Bright Hope is nearby.
