= Macon, Virginia =

Unincorporated community in Virginia, US

Coordinates: 37°31′19″N 77°57′43″W

Macon is an unincorporated community in Powhatan County, in the U.S. state of Virginia. Macon was a stop on the Farmville and Powhatan Railroad from 1884 to 1905 and then on the Tidewater and Western Railroad from 1905 to 1917. It is on the new Virginia State Route 13 between Powhatan, Virginia, and Cumberland, Virginia, from 1918 to today.

Macon is near the Powhatan Wildlife Management Area.
