= Point of Rocks (Chester, Virginia) =

Historic house in Virginia, United States

- U.S. National Register of Historic Places
- Virginia Landmarks Register
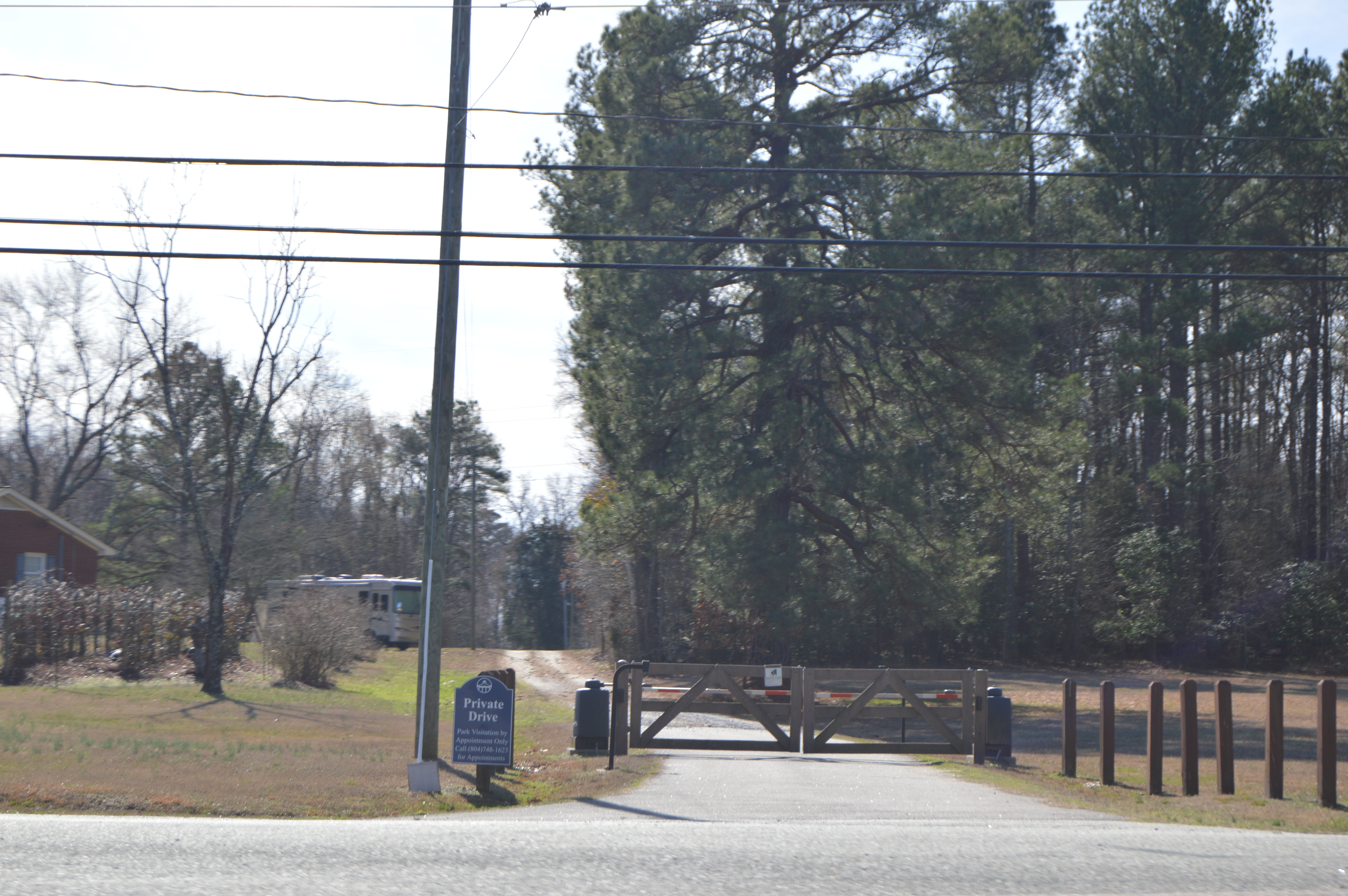
- Property entrance

- Location within Virginia Location within the United States
- Location: 1005 Point of Rocks Rd., Chester, Virginia
- Coordinates: 37°19′18″N 77°20′17″W
- Area: 10 acres (4.0 ha)
- Built: 1840
- Architectural style: Greek Revival
- NRHP reference No.: 05000134
- VLR No.: 020-0123

Significant dates
- Added to NRHP: March 10, 2005
- Designated VLR: December 6, 2004

Point of Rocks is a historic plantation house located near Chester, Chesterfield County, Virginia. It was built about 1840, and is a one-story, three-bay, double pile dwelling with weatherboard siding and a low-pitched hipped standing seam metal roof in the Greek Revival style. Also on the property is a contributing garage. The property was the location of a Union military observation point and headquarters for General Benjamin F. Butler and hospital established in 1864 during the Bermuda Hundred Campaign of the American Civil War. Union troops of the 2nd United States Colored Cavalry Regiment fought a skirmish against Confederate forces at Point of Rocks on May 23, 1864.

It was listed on the National Register of Historic Places in 2005.
