= Red Lane Tavern =

Historic commercial building in Virginia, United States

- U.S. National Register of Historic Places
- Virginia Landmarks Register
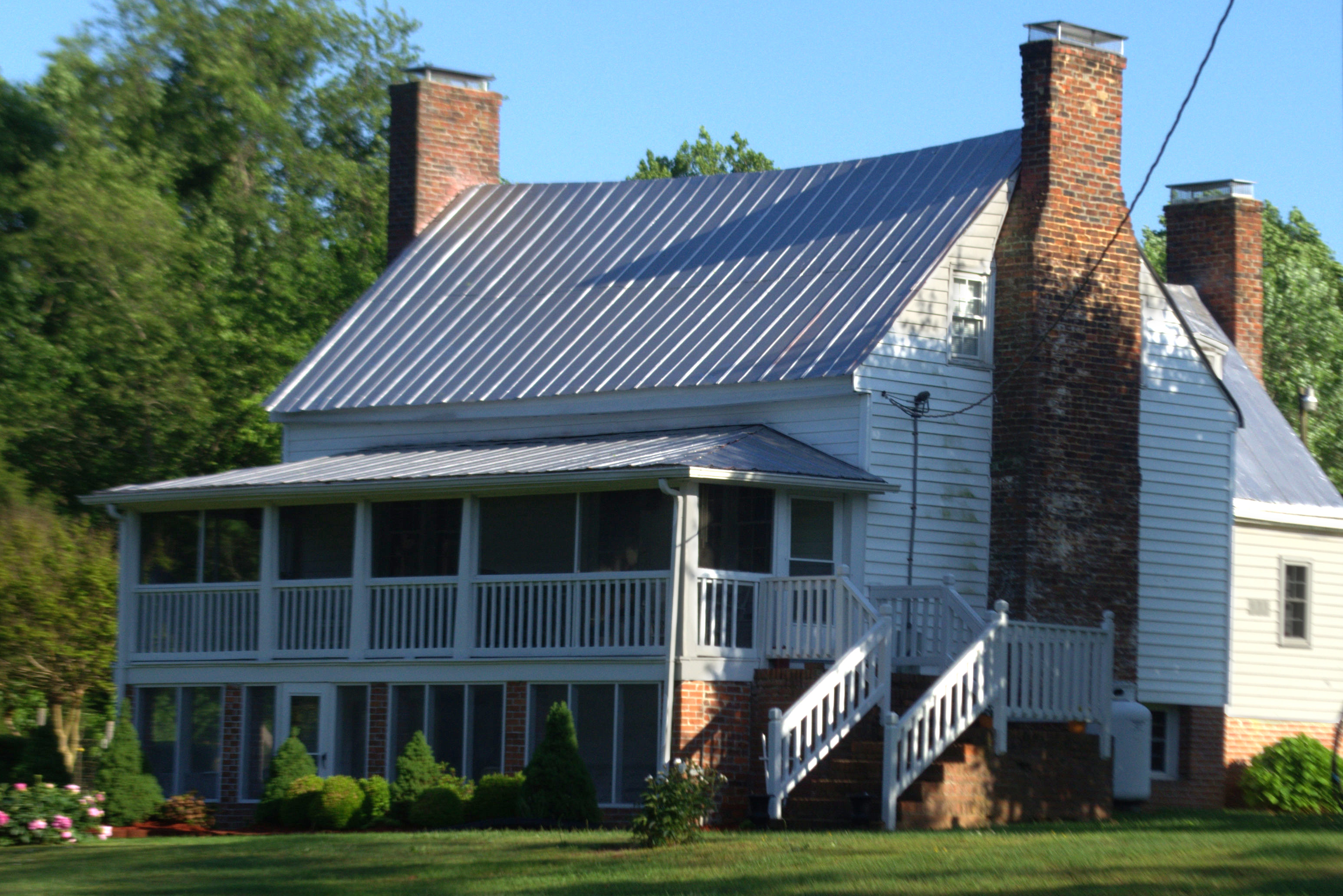

- Location within Virginia Location within the United States
- Location: 3009 Lower Hill Rd., Powhatan, Virginia
- Coordinates: 37°31′46″N 77°51′29″W
- Area: 6 acres (2.4 ha)
- Built: 1832
- Architectural style: Federal
- NRHP reference No.: 01001516
- VLR No.: 072-0044

Significant dates
- Added to NRHP: January 24, 2002
- Designated VLR: June 13, 2001

Red Lane Tavern is a historic inn and tavern located at Powhatan, Powhatan County, Virginia. It was built in 1832, and is a 1 1/2-story, log building set on a brick foundation. The main block has a gable roof and exterior end chimneys. It has a 1 1/2-story kitchen connect to the main block by a one-story addition. The building housed an ordinary from 1836 to 1845. It is representative of a Tidewater South folk house.

It was added to the National Register of Historic Places in 2002.
