= Manchester, Chesterfield County, Virginia =

Manchester
- CDP
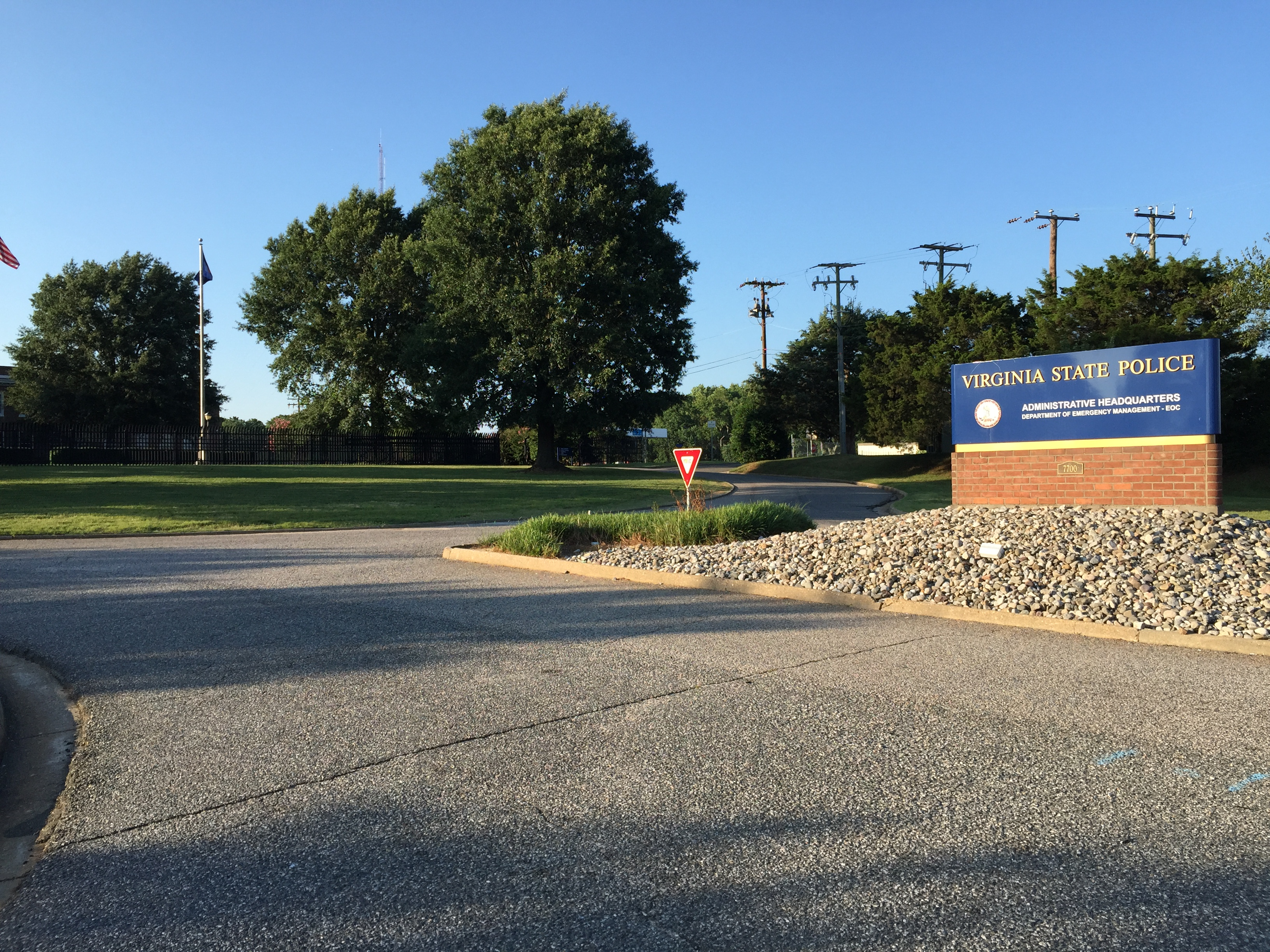
- Virginia State Police headquarters in Manchester

- Location within the Commonwealth of Virginia
- Coordinates: 37°29′20″N 77°32′38″W
- Country: United States
- State: Virginia
- County: Chesterfield

Population (2020)
  - Total: 12,129
- Time zone: UTC−5 (Eastern (EST))
  - Summer (DST): UTC−4 (EDT)
- ZIP codes: 23225, 23235, 23236
- FIPS code: 51-48996
- GNIS feature ID: 2584873

Manchester is a census-designated place in northern Chesterfield County, Virginia, United States. The population as of the 2010 Census was 10,804.

== Description ==
Manchester is one of Chesterfield County's 25 designated "communities"; it borders Southside Richmond to the west, but is not to be confused with the city's Manchester neighborhood.

== Demographics ==
Historical population
Census	Pop.	Note	%±
2010	10,804		—
2020	12,129		12.3%
U.S. Decennial Census; 2010 2020

Manchester was first listed as a census designated place in the 2010 U.S. census formed out of part of the Bon Air CDP and additional area.

=== Racial and ethnic composition ===
Manchester CDP, Virginia – Racial and ethnic composition Note: the US Census treats Hispanic/Latino as an ethnic category. This table excludes Latinos from the racial categories and assigns them to a separate category. Hispanics/Latinos may be of any race.
Race / Ethnicity (NH = Non-Hispanic)	Pop 2010	Pop 2020	% 2010	% 2020
White alone (NH)	5,390	5,092	49.89%	41.98%
Black or African American alone (NH)	3,386	3,406	31.34%	28.08%
Native American or Alaska Native alone (NH)	21	21	0.19%	0.17%
Asian alone (NH)	313	410	2.90%	3.38%
Native Hawaiian or Pacific Islander alone (NH)	7	2	0.06%	0.02%
Other race alone (NH)	33	76	0.31%	0.63%
Mixed race or Multiracial (NH)	218	632	2.02%	5.21%
Hispanic or Latino (any race)	1,436	2,490	13.29%	20.53%
Total	10,804	12,129	100.00%	100.00%

== See also ==
- List of census-designated places in Virginia
