= Nicholas Mills =

American businessman

Nicholas Mills Sr. (23 November 1781 – 13 September 1862) was a businessman in Richmond, Virginia. He built a 13-mile tramway known as the Chesterfield Railroad Company (forerunner of Virginia's first railways) to connect the coal pits of Chesterfield County to the James River. A staunch Unionist, over his house flew the last Union flag in Richmond, April 1861. He was at one time the owner of the Chesterfield Coal Pits and president of the Tredegar Iron Works. When he died in 1862 he is reported to have had $800,000 in gold (roughly US$19,955,000 in 2017) stored in his vault, probably making him the wealthiest man in Virginia.

He was born in Hanover County, Virginia on November 23, 1781 and moved to Chesterfield County in 1803. On August 8, 1805, at the age of 22 or 23, Mills married Sarah Payne Ronald (1788–1857), the daughter of attorney Andrew Ronald and Sally Payne Ronald, a cousin of Dolley Madison. In 1811 Mills joined a firm involved in the Chesterfield County coal mining business called Bott and Cunliffe (named after Miles Bott and John Cunliffe and subsequently called Mills, Bott, and Cunliffe). In 1815, Miles Bott had to sell his share in the firm to Mills as a result of some financial difficulties.

In 1814, he served for three months and three days as Brigade Quartermaster in the 1st (Chamberlayne's) Brigade, Virginia Militia, during the War of 1812. Thereafter a staunch Unionist, over his house flew the last Union flag in Richmond, in April 1861.
