= Chesterfield County, Virginia =

County in Virginia, United States

- County
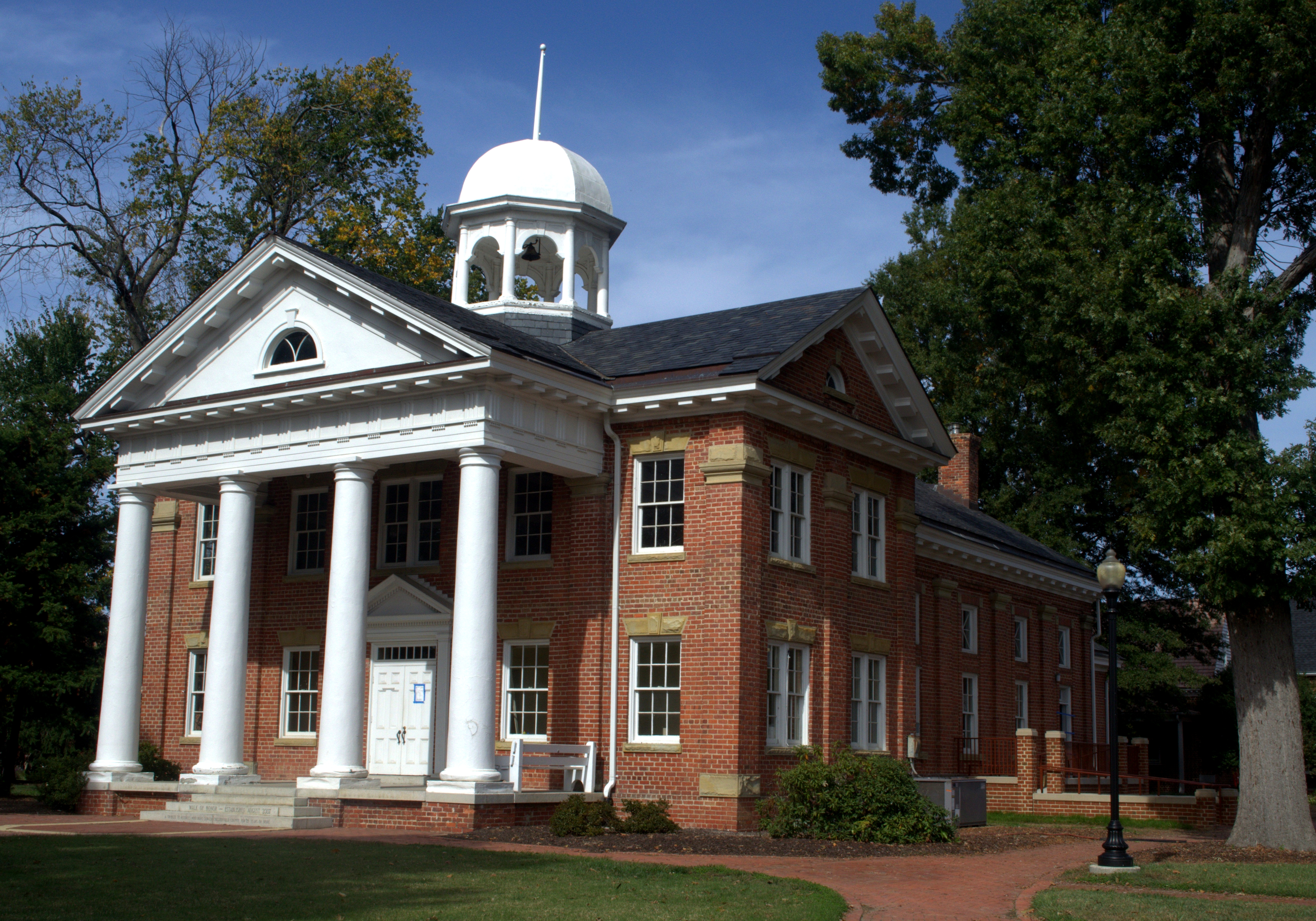
- Old Chesterfield County Courthouse

- Flag Seal

- Location within the U.S. state of Virginia
- Coordinates: 37°23′N 77°35′W
- Country: United States
- State: Virginia
- Founded: May 25, 1749
- Named for: Philip Stanhope, 4th Earl of Chesterfield; Chesterfield, Derbyshire, England
- Seat: Chesterfield Court House
- Largest community: Chester

Area
  - Total: 437 sq mi (1,130 km^{2})
  - Land: 423 sq mi (1,100 km^{2})
  - Water: 14 sq mi (36 km^{2}) 3.1%

Population (2020)
  - Total: 364,548
  - Estimate (2025): 397,148 ▲
  - Density: 862/sq mi (333/km^{2})
- Time zone: UTC−5 (Eastern)
  - Summer (DST): UTC−4 (EDT)
- Congressional districts: 1st, 4th
- Website: chesterfield.gov

Chesterfield County is a county located just south of Richmond in the Commonwealth of Virginia. The county's borders are primarily defined by the James River to the north and the Appomattox River to the south. Its county seat is Chesterfield Court House.

Chesterfield County was formed in 1749 from parts of Henrico County. It was named for Philip Stanhope, 4th Earl of Chesterfield, a prominent English statesman who had been the Lord Lieutenant of Ireland.

As of the 2020 census, the population was 364,548, making it the fourth-most populous county in Virginia (behind Fairfax, Prince William, and Loudoun, respectively). Chesterfield County is part of the Greater Richmond Region, and the county refers to much of the northern portion as "North Chesterfield".

== History ==
=== Part of Henrico Citie, Henrico Shire, Henrico County ===
During the early 17th century, shortly after the settlement of Jamestown in 1607, English settlers and explorers began settling other areas. One of the more progressive developments in the colony was Henricus, founded under the guidance of Sir Thomas Dale. It was to include a college to help educate Virginia Indians, as well as the children of settlers. Dale was accompanied by men known as the "Hammours". These veterans of the Low Country wars were heavily armed and better trained than settlers of Jamestown.

Dale wrote about the site: "Eighty miles up our river from Jamestown, I have surveyed a convenient, strong, healthie and sweete site to plant a new towne (according as I had instructions upon my departure) there to build whence might be removed the principal site." Today known as Farrar's Island, the site was on a neck of land with 5,000 acres (20 km^{2}) and a shoreline of seven miles (11 km) on the James River. The English settlers soon built a palisade and moat-like ditch to protect entrance to the 174-yard (159 m) wide neck from the shore area.

Dale named the new settlement Henricus in honor of Henry Frederick, Prince of Wales, the elder son and heir apparent of King James I. When finished in 1619, "Henricus Citie" contained three streets of well-framed houses, a church, storehouses, a hospital, and watchtowers. 1619 was a watershed year for the Virginia Colony. Henrico and three other large citties (sic) were formed, one of which included what is now Chesterfield County. That year Falling Creek Ironworks, the first in what is now the United States, was established slightly west on the creek near its confluence with the James River. In the Indian massacre of 1622, Native Americans destroyed Henrico City and the ironworks to try to drive away the English. These were not rebuilt. The colony did not gain a college until 1693, when the College of William and Mary was awarded a royal charter in the capital.

In 1634, the King of England directed the formation of eight shires (or counties) in the colony of Virginia. One of these was Henrico County, which incorporated a large area on both sides of the James River.

=== Chesterfield County formed ===
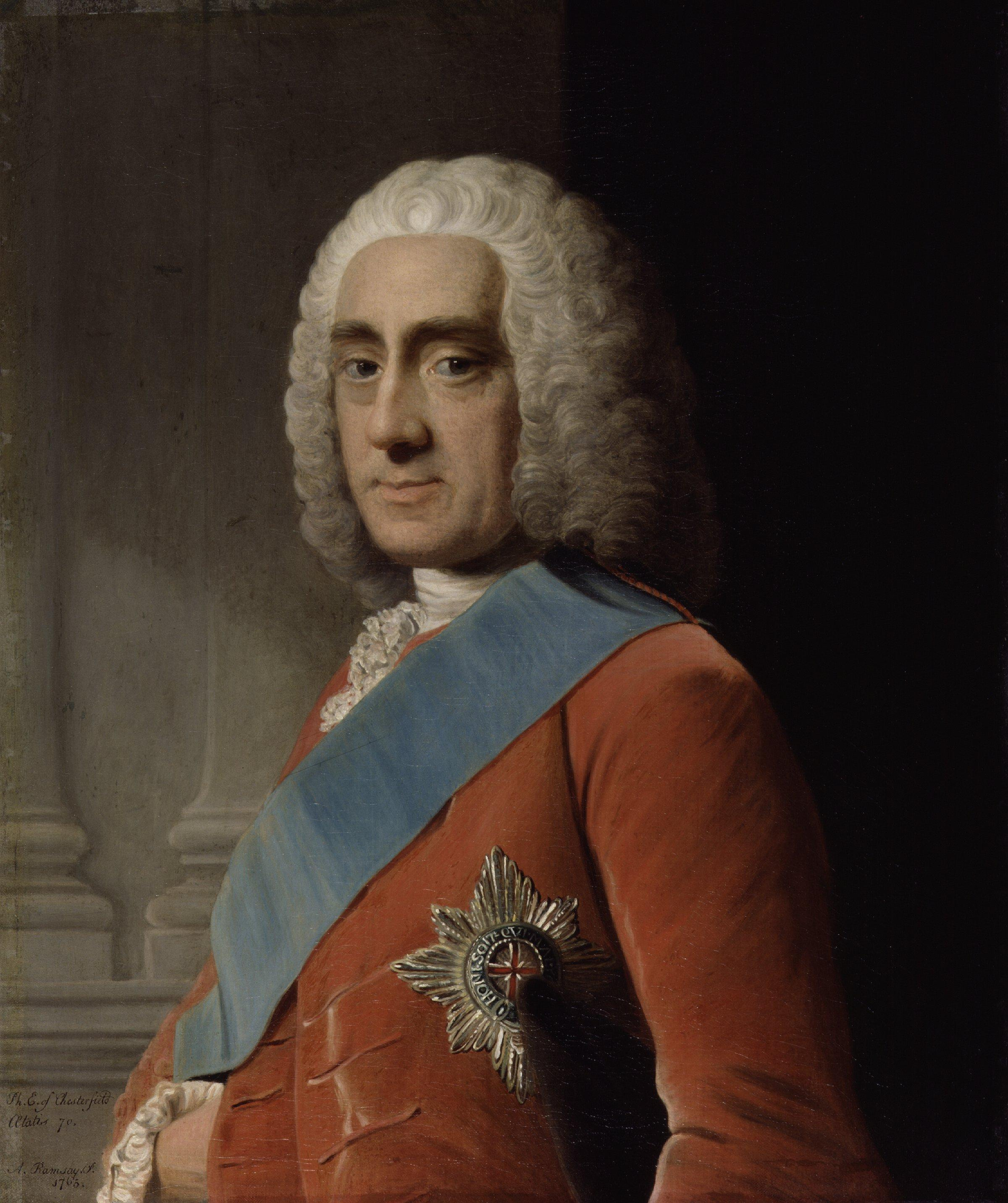
The 4th Earl of Chesterfield, whom Chesterfield County was named after

On May 25, 1749, the Virginia House of Burgesses separated Chesterfield from Henrico County and created the new county. The first county seat was established at Chesterfield Court House. It has continued as county seat except for 1870–1876, during Reconstruction, when the county government was located at Manchester. The latter community has been subsumed by South Richmond.

The legislature named the county after the British politician and writer Philip Stanhope, 4th Earl of Chesterfield, who was famed for his "good manners and writings". Many years later, Chesterfield Cigarettes were named after this county. In 1939 during the Great Depression, the Virginia State Police moved their offices from downtown Richmond to a seven-room farmhouse located on 65 acres (260,000 m^{2}) of land 3½ miles west on route 60. This structure served as administrative headquarters and barracks. The State Police have since built a new administrative headquarters and an academy there.

=== Early ports, coal, roads, turnpikes and railroads ===
Prior to the American Revolutionary War, a thriving port town named Warwick was located at the northwestern confluence of Falling Creek and the James River. It was destroyed during that war, and not rebuilt. (Near the present-day DuPont facility at Ampthill, the site is not open to the public.) Another early port town was Port Walthall on the north shore of the Appomattox River, near the current Point-of-Rocks Park.

Coal mining in the Midlothian area of Chesterfield County began in the 18th century. Around 1701, French Huguenot settlers to the area discovered coal. In a 1709 diary entry William Byrd II, the wealthy planter who had purchased 344 acres (1.4 km^{2}) of land in the area, noted that "the coaler found the coal mine very good and sufficient to furnish several generations". Commercially mined beginning in the 1730s, the coal fueled the production of cannon at Westham (near the present Huguenot Memorial Bridge) during the American Revolutionary War. In 1831, the Chesterfield Railroad was constructed to transport coal by gravity and mule power to Manchester, Virginia on the south side of the James River across from Richmond, Virginia.

From the 1740s through the 1800s rivers above the Fall Line were used for transportation to the West with James River bateau, which could carry about a ton, and boats several times larger from Eppington. The Appomattox River on the Southern border was the lower end of the Upper Appomattox Canal Navigation System connecting to Farmville, Virginia. The James River and Kanawha Canal on the northern border of Chesterfield connected past the Blue Ridge Mountains. Port Walthall connected ships that carried more than 200 tonnes to the East with Ports on the Atlantic Ocean. A canal was built in the Manchester section of Chesterfield to enable transporting coal around the James River falls. Portions are extant and may be seen near the south end of Richmond's Mayo Bridge.

The Manchester Turnpike in Chesterfield County, completed in 1807, was the first graveled roadway of any length in Virginia. The toll road ran between the coal mining area of Midlothian near the headwaters of Falling Creek and the James River port of Manchester. The current Midlothian Turnpike (U.S. Route 60) generally follows the earlier route.

Created in 1816, the Virginia Board of Public Works was a governmental agency which oversaw and helped finance the development of Virginia's internal transportation improvements, including canals, during the 19th century. In that era, it was customary to invest public funds in private companies, which were the forerunners of the public service and utility companies of modern times. Claudius Crozet (1789–1864), a civil engineer and educator who helped found the Virginia Military Institute (VMI), was Principal Engineer and later Chief Engineer for the Board of Public Works. He supervised the planning and construction of many of the canals, turnpikes, bridges and railroads in Virginia, including the area which is now West Virginia.

The Board partially engineered and funded new turnpikes, which were operated by private companies to collect tolls. The Manchester and Petersburg Turnpike, which preceded much of the current Jefferson Davis Highway (U.S. Routes 1–301), was one of these.

To improve access to markets, in 1825, a group of mine owners, including Nicholas Mills, Beverley Randolph and Abraham S. Wooldridge, resolved to build a tramway. (The Wooldridge brothers hailed from East Lothian and West Lothian in Scotland, and named their mining company Mid-Lothian, the source of the modern community name). In 1831, the Chesterfield Railroad opened as the first railroad in Virginia; it carried coal from mines near Falling Creek to the docks at the fall line on the James River. By the early 1850s, railroad lines connecting these areas included the Richmond and Danville Railroad (R&D) (which put the Chesterfield Railroad out of business) and the Richmond and Petersburg Railroad. They were both completed before the American Civil War, in which they provided important transportation for Southern supplies and men.

The Clover Hill Railroad was built to haul coal, mined in Chesterfield at the Clover Hill Pits to ports at Osborne's Landing. This railroad was replaced by the Brighthope Railway, which was, in 1881, narrowed into a narrow gauge railroad and rerouted to the tiny village of Bermuda Hundred, a port on the James River near the mouth of the Appomattox River. The Brighthope Railway was sold in foreclosure and restructured as the Farmville and Powhatan Railroad, later renamed the Tidewater and Western Railroad, extended to Farmville in Prince Edward County. Although long gone, portions of the old rail bed may be seen along Beach Road near the entrance to Pocahontas State Park. A water stop station in the Park remains and Beach Station remains as a national historic landmark.

=== American Civil War ===
During the American Civil War (1861–1865), Drewry's Bluff became a key defensive point for Confederate forces to block the Union's vastly superior Navy from taking Richmond by way of the James River. During the Siege of Petersburg (1864–65), a long defensive works through the county was part of the Confederacy's Richmond-Petersburg line of land defenses. Railroad lines passing through Petersburg finally proved the key to the fall of Richmond in 1865, effectively ending the war.

=== Reconstruction ===
A normal school founded by the state after the American Civil War primarily to help educate freed men eventually became Virginia State University, located in the Ettrick area near Petersburg and Colonial Heights. The U.S. Government rebuilt damaged railroads.

After Reconstruction, Chesterfield County used convict lease to build roads in 1878.

The Richmond and Danville Railroad became part of the Southern Railway in 1894. It is now part of Norfolk Southern Railway. The Richmond and Petersburg Railroad became part of the Atlantic Coast Line Railroad. In 1900, a mostly parallel line was built by the Seaboard Air Line Railroad, with a branch line to Hopewell. Through the restructuring of the railroad industry beginning in 1960, the CSX Transportation system eventually absorbed parts of both these lines.

=== Former areas lost to new independent cities ===
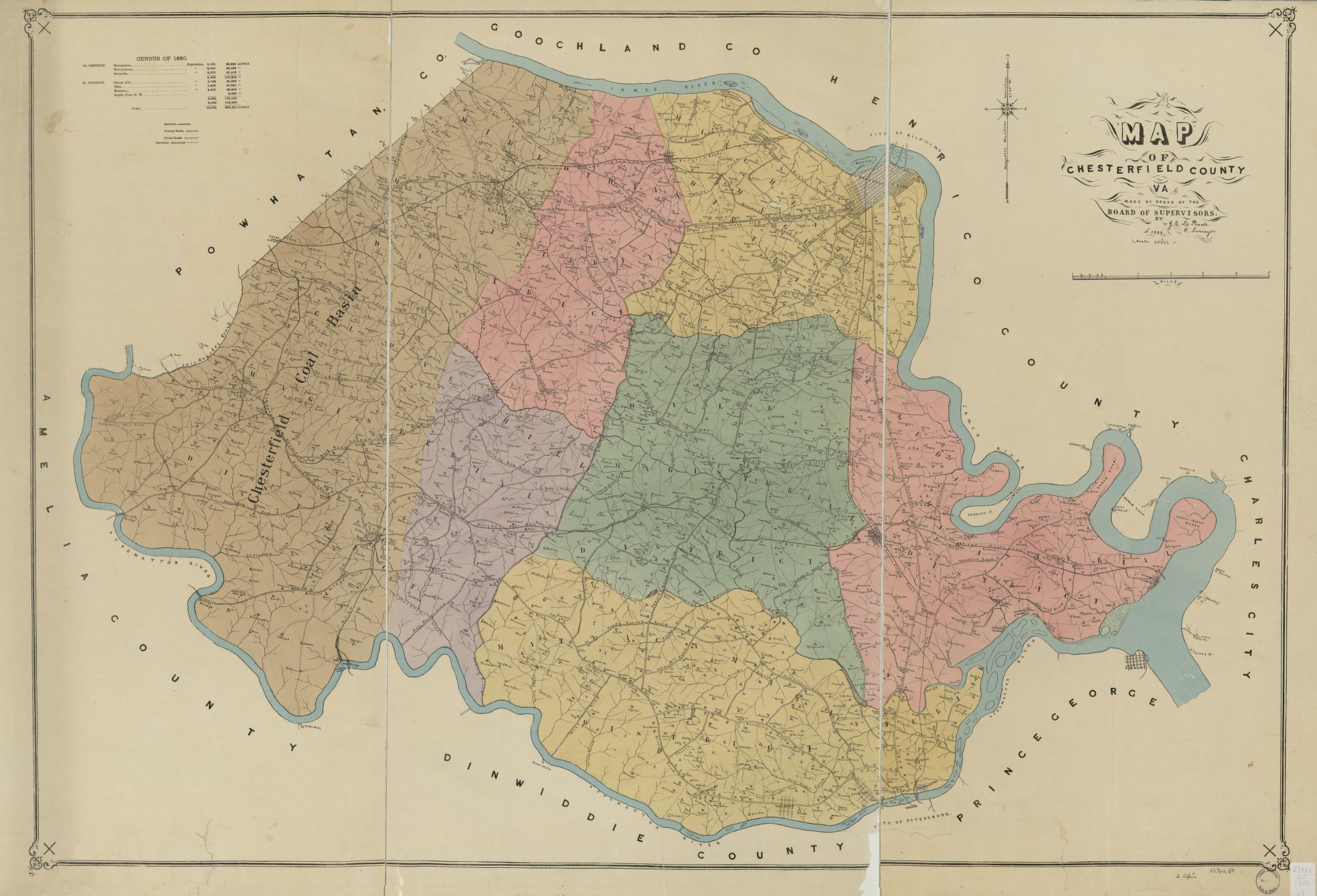
This 1888 map by surveyor Joseph Edgar LaPrade depicts six magisterial districts of Chesterfield County prior to the 1910 annexation of Manchester.

Manchester (directly across the James River from the City of Richmond) was the county seat of Chesterfield County from 1870 until 1876, when it was moved to the present location at Chesterfield Court House. The City of Manchester had meanwhile left Chesterfield in 1874 to become an independent city and merged with the City of Richmond by mutual agreement in 1910. It is now known as a part of South Richmond.

Colonial Heights was formerly an incorporated town in Chesterfield County and became an independent city in 1948. Over half a century later, the two neighbors continued to share provision of some governmental services.

=== Annexation issues ===
Chesterfield County shares borders with three independent cities and was long exposed to annexation suits from any of them under Virginia law. The county lost territory to the City of Richmond through several annexations in the 20th century, including one in 1944. The city tried to annex more of the county in 1970, an action that created controversy.

While the annexation lawsuit filed by Richmond in 1965 was being heard, with the city seeking 51 square miles (132 km^{2}) of the county, the leaders of the two jurisdictions, Irvin G. Horner, Chairman of the Chesterfield County Board of Supervisors, and Phil J. Bagley, Jr., the Mayor of Richmond, met privately and agreed to a compromise. In May 1969, the city and Chesterfield County approved what was called the Horner-Bagley Compromise, incorporated in a court decree of July 12, 1969. This effectively shut out a number of third parties attempting to block the annexation, and they believed they had been excluded from the process. A small commuter bus company held operating rights in the county, but the expanded city granted the franchise to a competitor.

Richmond annexed 23 square miles (60 km^{2}) of the county, including fire stations, parks, and other infrastructure, such as water and sewer lines. Under the agreement, the county school system also conveyed about a dozen public schools, support buildings, and future school sites to the City of Richmond to be operated by Richmond Public Schools. Residents of the annexed area were unhappy about this change, as Richmond Public Schools was already involved in a contentious racial desegregation lawsuit in the Federal courts because of its failure to integrate. The transferred schools included Huguenot High School, Fred D. Thompson Middle School, Elkhardt Middle School, and eight elementary schools. In 1971, the federal court ordered these schools included in a citywide desegregation busing program. This ended in the 1990s.

Many of the 47,000 residents who lived in the annexed area had been opposed to the action. They fought unsuccessfully for more than 7 years in the courts to have the agreement reversed. Some called the annexed 23 square miles (60 km^{2}) area "Occupied Chesterfield."

Many black residents of Richmond also opposed the annexation, claiming that it violated the National Voting Rights Act of 1965. They said the city had deliberately diminished their voting power by adding the white voters of the annexed area, which diluted the black vote within the city. In 1970 the pre-annexation population of the city was 202,359, of which 104,207 or 52% were black citizens. The annexation added 47,262 people, of whom 45,705 were non-black and 1,557 were black. The total post-annexation population was 249,621 and 42% black.

The plaintiffs prevailed in federal court. The city created an electoral ward system to ensure blacks did not lose their voting power, changing what had been a system of electing all city council positions at large (by which the majority population would more easily prevail). Under the ward system, four wards had a predominantly white population, four wards had a predominantly black population, and one ward had a population that was 59% white and 41% black. Soon after the ward system was established, the city elected its first black mayor.

=== Revisions in state annexation laws ===
Many political leaders have long believed that Virginia's annexation laws have created a barrier to regional cooperation among localities. The issues resulting from the 1970 Richmond-Chesterfield case were considered prime examples of obstacles to regional cooperation as the state legislators considered changes. In 1979, the Virginia General Assembly adopted legislation that allowed any county meeting certain population and density standards to petition the local circuit court to declare the county permanently immune from annexation. In 1981, Chesterfield County and several other counties in the state sought and received such immunity from further annexation by Richmond.

Recognizing the controversy surrounding annexations in Virginia, in 1987, the General Assembly placed a moratorium on future annexations of any county by any city. When this moratorium expires, Chesterfield County remains immune from annexation by Richmond because of the 1981 state grant of immunity. Unless new revenue sharing or other agreements are reached, the county is at risk to annexation suits by any of the smaller independent cities of Colonial Heights, Hopewell, and Petersburg which adjoin it.

== Highways, transportation, tolls ==
Beginning especially in the second half of the 20th century, Chesterfield grew exponentially, most of all as a commuter town of Richmond. The Richmond-Petersburg Interurban Electric Railway, local streetcar service, and commuter rail service of the Southern Railway to Bon Air had all ended by 1957.

Although some bus routes extended into the county from both cities, the county did not fund transit bus service when the large systems in Richmond and Petersburg converted to governmentally subsidized operations in the 1970s. Privately owned suburban bus services, such as that operated by Virginia Overland Transportation could not operate profitably, even when funded with start-up money through state demonstration program grants. County leaders believed the Chesterfield residents were committed to individual auto use for most local, commuter, and through transportation of people. With the increases in population, traffic, and poor air quality, some residents have asked the county to fund commuter bus services. Further complicating the issue is the general lack of sidewalks along most roads, adding to residents' dependence on motor vehicles.

Although the Virginia Department of Transportation (VDOT) built interstate, primary and secondary highways throughout the 20th century, they quickly filled with traffic as the population and use of autos increased. Customary funding sources were insufficient to raise the monies needed for highway construction. Opened in 1958 and funded through toll revenue bonds, the Richmond-Petersburg Turnpike was a toll highway which paralleled U.S. 1 and U.S. Route 301 between the northern edge of Richmond and the southern limits of Petersburg. Its portion through Chesterfield County was the longest section of its mileage. Conceived prior to the creation of the Interstate Highway System, the roadway was made toll-free in 1992. The former Richmond-Petersburg Turnpike forms a vital portion of Interstate 95 in central Virginia, including the northernmost portion of Interstate 85 near Petersburg.

The Powhite Parkway Extension of the Powhite Parkway in Richmond, Virginia (a toll road operated by the Richmond Metropolitan Authority) was built and opened in 1988. The extension in Chesterfield County is operated by and the tolls are collected by VDOT. (The entire route in Richmond and Chesterfield is signed as Virginia State Route 76.) The county extension begins at the exit for State Route 150 (Chippenham Parkway) and includes major exits for U.S. Route 60 west of Richmond, and State Route 288 in the Midlothian area. The southern terminus of State Route 76 is near the Brandermill development. Today the Powhite Parkway features a new highspeed toll system that allows smart-tag and e-z pass holders to travel through at speeds of 45–50 mph.

The Pocahontas Parkway, an 8.8-mile (14.2 km) toll road known as State Route 895, connects the junction of Interstate 95 and State Route 150 in Chesterfield County with Interstate 295 near Richmond International Airport in Henrico County, forming part of a southeastern bypass of Richmond. The roadway features the high-level Vietnam Veterans Memorial Bridge over the shipping channel of the James River downstream from the deep-water Port of Richmond, to allow ample clearance for ocean-going vessels.

Although Route 895 had been planned for many years, sufficient state and federal construction funds were not available at the time of construction, but the state encouraged innovative funding. In 1995, the Virginia General Assembly passed the Public-Private Transportation Act, to allow private entities to propose solutions for designing, constructing, financing and operating transportation improvements. A public-private partnership developed a proposal acceptable to the state. Since construction, the partnership has collected tolls to recover costs. The toll collection facility features one of the Richmond area's high-speed open lanes, enabling vehicles to travel through at highway speeds with a Smart Tag or other compatible electronic toll collection transponder.

The Greater Richmond Transit Company (GRTC), metro Richmond's bus transit organization, unveiled the Route 111 bus line in March 2020. The route runs 7.6 miles, from north of the Chippenham Parkway interchange to Brightpoint Community College in Chester.

The Virginia Department of Transportation (VDOT) is planning two superstreets in Chesterfield County to address left turns at high traffic volume intersections. Anticipated completion is in 2022.

== Planning ==
The Chesterfield County Planning Department oversees the parameters and scope of several economic development projects submitted in the county, including the development and implementation of the county's Master Plan that guides growth and commerce. The Planning Department introduced an online system in April 2020 to allow the submission and review of development plans via email.

The county launched the new Community Facilities and Infrastructure tool in June 2020, which allows the tracking of information related to the county's capital improvement plan including data regarding school enrollment.

== Economy ==
The Chesterfield Economic Development Authority (CEDA), a seven-member board appointed by the Chesterfield County Board of Supervisors, works in conjunction with the Department of Economic Development to create new jobs, expand the tax base and diversify the economy of Chesterfield County. CEDA is chartered through a state law that allows cities and counties to create industrial or economic development authorities with wide-ranging powers not available to local governments in order to facilitate economic development opportunities within the community. CEDA has the power to buy, sell and develop land for business parks or other economic development purposes. It can also build facilities for sale or lease to private companies; issue taxable and tax-exempt Industrial Revenue Bonds to provide financing for facilities and machinery and provide incentives to attract new companies to Chesterfield County or to induce existing companies to expand.

In 2024, Commonwealth Fusion Systems, a Massachusetts-based nuclear fusion startup, announced plans to build the world’s first grid-scale commercial fusion power plant at the James River Industrial Center in the county. In 2025, the county approved the conditional use permit for the fusion reactor.

Top 25 Private Employers

EMPLOYER	INDUSTRY	SIZE CLASS
Amazon Fulfillment Services	Administrative and Support Services	1,000 and over employees
HCA Virginia Health System	Hospitals	1,000 and over employees
United Parcel Service	Couriers and Messengers	1,000 and over employees
Walmart	General Merchandise Stores	1,000 and over employees
DuPont Specialty Products USA, LLC	Chemical Manufacturing	1,000 and over employees
Kroger	Food and Beverage Stores	1,000 and over employees
Bon Secours Richmond Health System	Hospitals	1,000 and over employees
Food Lion	Food and Beverage Stores	1,000 and over employees
Capital One	Credit Intermediation and Related Activities	1,000 and over employees
Integrity Staffing Solutions	Administrative and Support Services	500 to 999 employees
Interpsan Inc	Administrative and Support Services	500 to 999 employees
Maximus Services LLC	Administrative and Support Services	500 to 999 employees
Lowe's	Building Material and Garden Equipment and Supplies Dealers	500 to 999 employees
Atlantic Constructors Inc	Construction of Buildings	500 to 999 employees
Virginia Credit Union, Inc.	Credit Intermediation and Related Activities	500 to 999 employees
Hill Phoenix	Machinery Manufacturing	500 to 999 employees
Sabra Dipping Co LLC	Merchant Wholesalers, Nondurable Goods	500 to 999 employees
YMCA	Religious, Grantmaking, Civic, Professional, and Similar Organizations	500 to 999 employees
Results Customer Solution	Administrative and Support Services	250 to 499 employees
The Home Depot	Building Material and Garden Equipment and Supplies Dealers	250 to 499 employees
Xerox State Healthcare	Data Processing, Hosting, and Related Services	250 to 499 employees
Wawa (company)	Gasoline Stations	250 to 499 employees
Target Corporation	General Merchandise Stores	250 to 499 employees
Old Dominion Insulation Inc	Specialty Trade Contractors	250 to 499 employees
Abilene Motor Express Inc	Truck Transportation	250 to 499 employees

== Geography ==
According to the U.S. Census Bureau, the county has a total area of 437 square miles (1,130 km^{2}), of which 423 square miles (1,100 km^{2}) is land and 14 square miles (36 km^{2}) (3.1%) is water.

Chesterfield County is largely bordered by two rivers which define miles of its boundaries. The major adjoining cities each originated at the head of navigation of these rivers, called the fall line. There, the hillier and rockier Piedmont region falls to the sandy and mostly flat eastern coastal plain Tidewater region, a change which creates barriers for ships going upstream on the rivers. Chesterfield County includes areas of both regions.

Richmond and Manchester were formed at the fall line of the James River. Most of the northern portion of Chesterfield County is part of what is called Richmond's "South Side". As the James River flows east to Richmond and then turns almost due south below the fall line for about 8 miles (13 km) before turning east, Henrico County encompasses much of Richmond's West End, North Side, and East End areas.

Chesterfield County borders on the Appomattox River to the south. Much of the southern and eastern portions of the county are considered part of the Tri-Cities area, which includes Petersburg, located at the fall line.

=== Adjacent counties ===
- Henrico County – northeast
- Richmond – northeast
- Charles City County – east
- Hopewell – southeast
- Prince George County – southeast
- Colonial Heights – southeast
- Petersburg – southeast
- Dinwiddie County – south
- Amelia County – southwest
- Powhatan County – northwest
- Goochland County – northwest

=== National protected areas ===
- Presquile National Wildlife Refuge
- Richmond National Battlefield Park (part)

=== Major highways ===
- I-95
- I-295
- US 1
- US 60
- US 301
- US 360
- SR 10
- SR 36
- SR 76 Toll
- SR 144
- SR 145
- SR 147
- SR 150
- SR 288
- SR 895 Toll

== Government ==
=== Board of Supervisors ===
- Bermuda District: Jim Ingle (R)
- Clover Hill District: Jessica Schneider (D)
- Dale District: LeQuan M. Hylton (interim; appointed)
- Matoaca District: Kevin P. Carroll (R)
- Midlothian District: Mark Miller (D)

=== Constitutional officers ===
- Clerk of the Circuit Court: Amanda L. Pohl (D)
- Commissioner of the Revenue: Jenefer Hughes (D)
- Commonwealth's Attorney: Erin Barr (I)
- Sheriff: Karl S. Leonard (R)
- Treasurer: Rebecca Longnaker (R)

=== Law enforcement ===
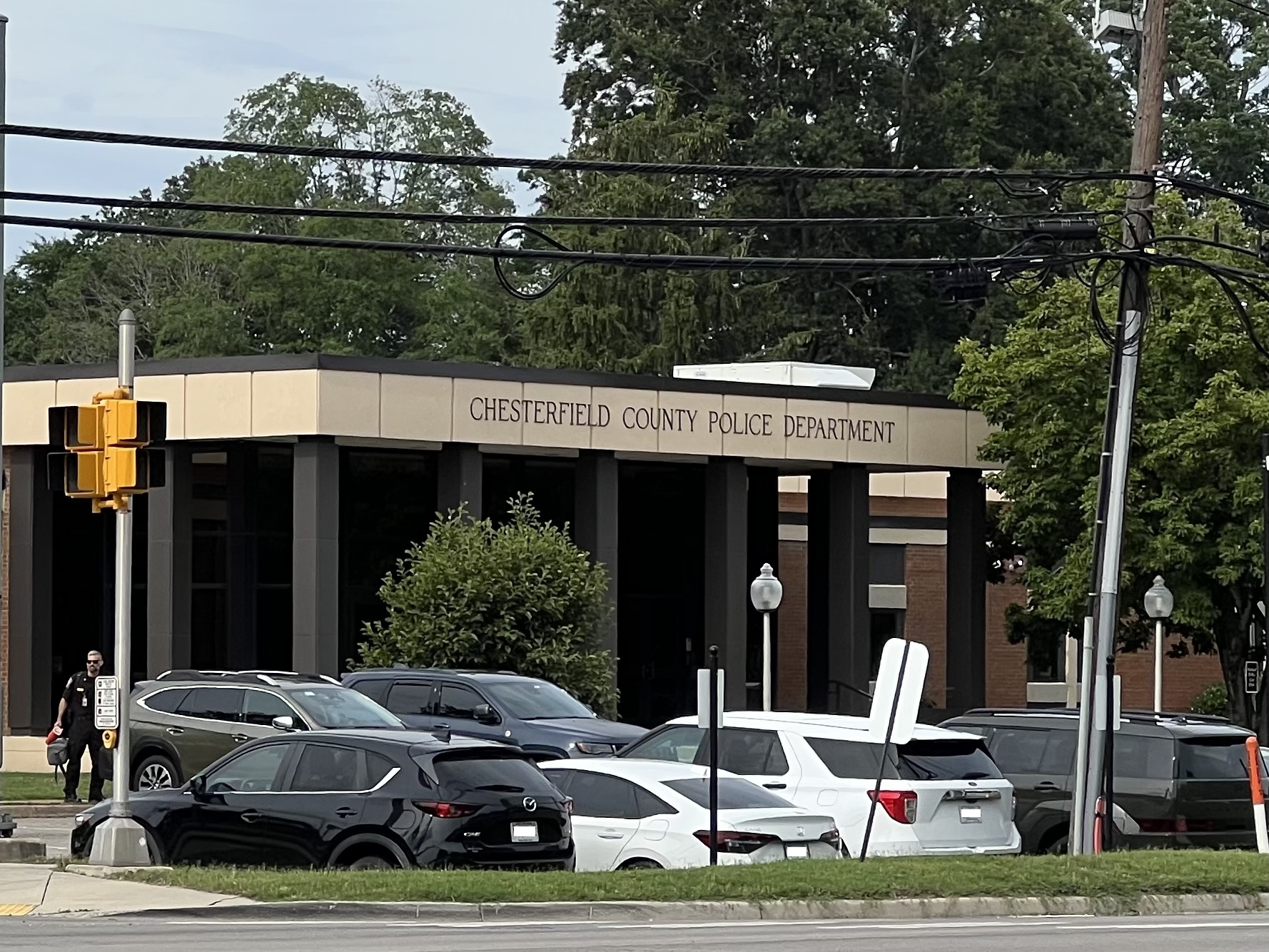
Chesterfield County Police Department headquarters in Chesterfield Court House.

The county-level law enforcement services are Chesterfield County Sheriff's Office (CCSO) and Chesterfield County Police Department (CCPD). As of 2022 the sheriff is Karl S. Leonard and the Chief of Police is Jeffrey S. Katz. The CCSO has had 60 sheriffs since its formation in 1749, while the CCPD was founded in 1914 and has had eight chiefs. The CCSO and the CCPD are accredited by the Virginia Law Enforcement Professional Standards Commission.

In 1841 the original jail, which was commissioned in 1749, was destroyed in a fire. This resulted in a new jail, which was used until the 1940s when it was converted into an emergency communications (dispatch) office. From the 1940s to 1960 CCSO inmates were housed in other jails until a new, modern facility was built. In the 1970s an addition was built onto the jail. In 1994, a new building was constructed to hold those charged with misdemeanors. Those facing and/or convicted of felonies were still housed in the old 1960 building, which was torn down in 2002. A new building, along with the 1994 section, now constitute the men's jail. There is no longer a Chesterfield jail for female inmates. They all are held at Riverside Regional Jail. In 1917 the original courthouse was demolished to make room for the new one. The 1917 courthouse is now on the National Register of Historic Places. It closed in 1989, when the current courthouse opened at the intersection of Courthouse and Iron Bridge roads.

In 2018, CCSO implemented a voluntary addiction recovery program in the county jail which utilizes peer-to-peer recovery support and professional counselors working to treat underlying conditions. The program is called the HARP program, an acronym for Helping Addicts Recover Permanently. Participants of the program are allowed to return to the jail and participate in group meetings after they have been discharged. The program also includes a recovery support network in the community.

In 2014, CCSO became the first county in Virginia to publicly state that it would not honor U.S. Immigration and Customs Enforcement detainer requests unless accompanied by a warrant.

A CCSO deputy was one of 6 law enforcement officers in Virginia found to be a member of the Oath Keepers organization when a list was leaked in 2022.

=== Government Complex ===
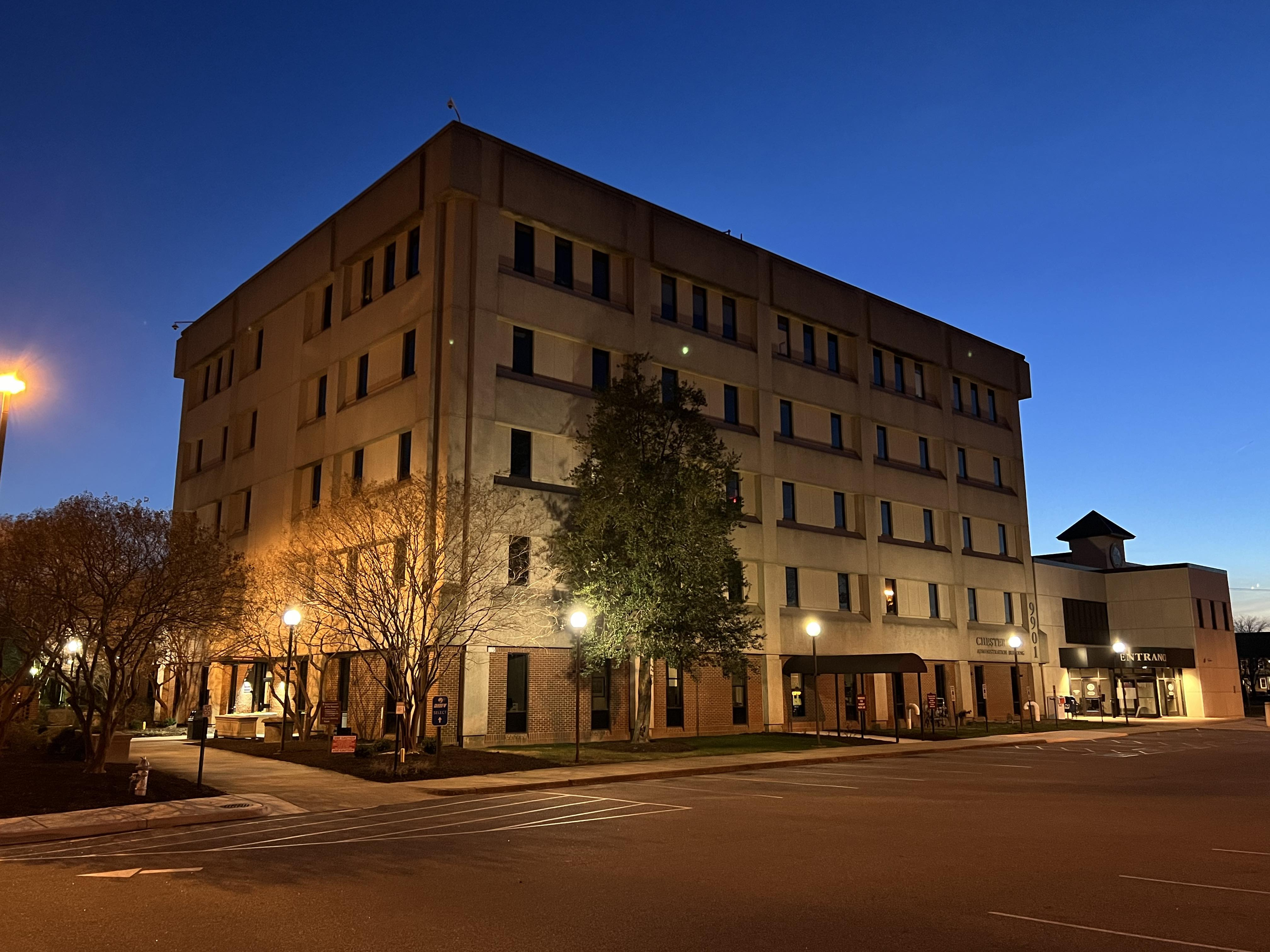
Chesterfield County Government Complex

The Chesterfield County Government Complex is the headquarters for the Chesterfield Count local government. It is the meeting place of the Chesterfield County Board of Supervisors. It also houses the offices of the Chesterfield County's bureaucratic agencies. The complex is bound by the historic Chesterfield County Courthouse and Courthouse Square. Major facilities on the complex include the county's Police Department headquarters and central police station, offices for the county's fire and EMS services, and social services.

=== State and federal ===
Chesterfield County is represented by Democrats Lashrecse Aird and Michael Jones and Republican Glen Sturtevant in the Virginia Senate and Democrats Leslie Mehta, Lindsey Dougherty, Debra Gardner, Charlie Schmidt and Delores L. McQuinn and Republicans R. Lee Ware, Jr. and Mike Cherry in the Virginia House of Delegates, and Democrat Jennifer McClellan and Republican Rob Wittman in the U.S. House of Representatives.

Like most of Richmond's suburbs, Chesterfield County historically tilted conservative. After voting for Democratic incumbent Harry Truman over the Republican nominee Thomas E. Dewey in 1948, it voted for GOP candidates in every election through 2016. It was one of the first areas of Virginia where the old-line Byrd Democrats began splitting their tickets at the national level. However, conservative Democrats continued to hold most local offices, as well as most of its seats in the state legislature, well into the 1980s.

From 2008 onward, however, the county began to be competitive; after 14 consecutive elections (including 1992 and 1996) in which Chesterfield had delivered double-digit margins to Republicans, John McCain won it in 2008 by just 7.4%, a margin which Mitt Romney expanded in 2012 only marginally to 7.8%. In 2016, Donald Trump became the first Republican in the county's post-1948 run of voting Republican to carry the county with only a plurality, as he received just 48.2% of the vote. In 2020, Joe Biden became the first Democrat in 72 years to carry the county, winning it by 6.6% (and with an absolute majority of the vote) over Trump. In 2024, Democrats carried the county once again, with Kamala Harris receiving 53.6% of the county's vote, a greater share of the vote compared to Biden and making Chesterfield one of the few counties or county equivalents to shift left despite Harris's loss.

United States presidential election results for Chesterfield County, Virginia
Year	Republican		Democratic		Third party(ies)	
Year	No.	%	No.	%	No.	%
1880	955	43.51%	1,240	56.49%	0	0.00%
1884	1,582	47.04%	1,780	52.93%	1	0.03%
1888	1,576	49.64%	1,589	50.05%	10	0.31%
1892	1,241	39.52%	1,747	55.64%	152	4.84%
1896	1,273	41.93%	1,727	56.88%	36	1.19%
1900	884	38.84%	1,368	60.11%	24	1.05%
1904	151	19.74%	597	78.04%	17	2.22%
1908	167	21.03%	608	76.57%	19	2.39%
1912	61	7.19%	702	82.78%	85	10.02%
1916	141	16.43%	699	81.47%	18	2.10%
1920	302	23.61%	964	75.37%	13	1.02%
1924	282	21.30%	967	73.04%	75	5.66%
1928	1,325	55.05%	1,082	44.95%	0	0.00%
1932	726	26.91%	1,886	69.90%	86	3.19%
1936	621	19.57%	2,522	79.48%	30	0.95%
1940	879	20.63%	3,354	78.71%	28	0.66%
1944	901	23.89%	2,860	75.82%	11	0.29%
1948	1,428	30.19%	2,600	54.97%	702	14.84%
1952	4,482	55.70%	3,546	44.07%	18	0.22%
1956	5,787	53.12%	3,306	30.35%	1,801	16.53%
1960	9,787	61.71%	5,982	37.72%	90	0.57%
1964	17,486	67.59%	8,376	32.38%	9	0.03%
1968	22,015	56.03%	5,715	14.54%	11,562	29.43%
1972	24,934	85.24%	3,823	13.07%	496	1.70%
1976	27,812	65.54%	14,126	33.29%	498	1.17%
1980	37,908	70.71%	13,060	24.36%	2,645	4.93%
1984	54,896	79.78%	13,739	19.97%	176	0.26%
1988	58,828	75.34%	18,723	23.98%	532	0.68%
1992	56,626	55.55%	28,028	27.50%	17,279	16.95%
1996	56,650	60.71%	30,220	32.39%	6,435	6.90%
2000	69,924	63.02%	38,638	34.82%	2,389	2.15%
2004	83,745	62.58%	49,346	36.88%	723	0.54%
2008	86,413	53.31%	74,310	45.85%	1,365	0.84%
2012	90,934	53.18%	77,694	45.44%	2,360	1.38%
2016	85,045	48.19%	81,074	45.94%	10,342	5.86%
2020	93,326	45.77%	106,935	52.45%	3,623	1.78%
2024	94,030	44.64%	112,869	53.59%	3,729	1.77%

== Demographics ==
Historical population
Census	Pop.	Note	%±
1790	14,214		—
1800	14,488		1.9%
1810	9,979		−31.1%
1820	18,003		80.4%
1830	18,637		3.5%
1840	17,148		−8.0%
1850	17,489		2.0%
1860	19,016		8.7%
1870	18,470		−2.9%
1880	25,085		35.8%
1890	26,211		4.5%
1900	18,804		−28.3%
1910	21,299		13.3%
1920	20,496		−3.8%
1930	26,049		27.1%
1940	31,183		19.7%
1950	40,400		29.6%
1960	71,197		76.2%
1970	76,855		7.9%
1980	141,372		83.9%
1990	209,274		48.0%
2000	259,903		24.2%
2010	316,236		21.7%
2020	364,548		15.3%
2025 (est.)	397,148	▲	8.9%
U.S. Decennial Census; 1790–1960 1900–1990; 1990–2000 2010 2020

=== Racial and ethnic composition ===
Chesterfield County, Virginia – Racial and ethnic composition Note: the US Census treats Hispanic/Latino as an ethnic category. This table excludes Latinos from the racial categories and assigns them to a separate category. Hispanics/Latinos may be of any race.
Race / Ethnicity (NH = Non-Hispanic)	Pop 1980	Pop 1990	Pop 2000	Pop 2010	Pop 2020	% 1980	% 1990	% 2000	% 2010	% 2020
White alone (NH)	125,066	175,516	196,076	206,792	210,881	88.47%	83.87%	75.44%	65.39%	57.85%
Black or African American alone (NH)	13,819	27,024	45,797	68,196	81,492	9.77%	12.91%	17.62%	21.56%	22.35%
Native American or Alaska Native alone (NH)	251	464	795	849	848	0.18%	0.22%	0.31%	0.27%	0.23%
Asian alone (NH)	1,094	3,668	6,123	10,219	13,096	0.77%	1.75%	2.36%	3.23%	3.59%
Native Hawaiian or Pacific Islander alone (NH)	x	x	95	142	177	x	x	0.04%	0.04%	0.05%
Other race alone (NH)	147	91	377	606	2,098	0.10%	0.04%	0.15%	0.19%	0.58%
Mixed race or Multiracial (NH)	x	x	3,023	6,568	15,720	x	x	1.16%	2.08%	4.31%
Hispanic or Latino (any race)	995	2,511	7,617	22,864	40,236	0.70%	1.20%	2.93%	7.23%	11.04%
Total	141,372	209,274	259,903	316,236	364,548	100.00%	100.00%	100.00%	100.00%	100.00%

=== 2020 census ===
As of the 2020 census, the county had a population of 364,548. The median age was 39.1 years. 24.0% of residents were under the age of 18 and 16.0% of residents were 65 years of age or older. For every 100 females there were 92.2 males, and for every 100 females age 18 and over there were 88.5 males age 18 and over.

The racial makeup of the county was 59.3% White, 22.8% Black or African American, 0.4% American Indian and Alaska Native, 3.6% Asian, 0.1% Native Hawaiian and Pacific Islander, 6.4% from some other race, and 7.4% from two or more races. Hispanic or Latino residents of any race comprised 11.0% of the population.

92.0% of residents lived in urban areas, while 8.0% lived in rural areas.

There were 133,482 households in the county, of which 35.4% had children under the age of 18 living with them and 26.5% had a female householder with no spouse or partner present. About 21.7% of all households were made up of individuals and 9.3% had someone living alone who was 65 years of age or older.

There were 138,691 housing units, of which 3.8% were vacant. Among occupied housing units, 75.2% were owner-occupied and 24.8% were renter-occupied. The homeowner vacancy rate was 1.2% and the rental vacancy rate was 5.4%.

=== 2010 Census ===
At the 2010 census, there were 316,236 people, 115,680 households and 86,237 families residing in the county. The population density was 610 people per square mile (240 people/km^{2}).

There were 97,707 housing units at an average density of 230 units per square mile (89 units/km^{2}). The racial makeup of the county was 68.3% White, 21.9% Black or African American, 0.4% Native American, 3.3% Asian, 0.1% Pacific Islander, 3.4% from other races, and 2.6% from two or more races. 7.2% of the population were Hispanic or Latino of any race.

The largest ancestry groups in Chesterfield County include African American (18%), English (14.5%), German (12.5%), Irish (11%), Italian (4%) and Scots-Irish (3%).

There were 115,680 households, of which 35.6% had children under the age of 18 living with them, 56.9% were husband-wife family living together, 4.4% had a male householder with no husband present, 13.2% had a female householder with no husband present, and 25.5% were non-families. 20.7% of all households were made up of individuals, and 6.7% had someone living alone who was 65 years of age or older. The average household size was 2.69 and the average family size was 3.11.

Age distribution was 26.1% under the age of 18, 5.5% from 20 to 24, 26.5% from 25 to 44, 28.60% from 45 to 64, and 10.4% who were 65 years of age or older. The median age was 37.6 years. For every 100 people there were 52 females.

In 2000, the median household income was $58,537, and the median family income was $65,058. Males had a median income of $43,030 versus $30,518 for females. The per capita income for the county was $25,286. About 3.30% of families and 4.50% of the population were below the poverty line, including 5.60% of those under age 18 and 3.40% of those age 65 or over.

== Town twinning ==
In 2005, Chesterfield County agreed to form a relationship with the Borough of Gravesham in Kent, England. The town of Gravesend on the River Thames is part of the borough. It was here that Pocahontas was buried after dying on a trip to England. Matoaca in Chesterfield County was traditionally believed to be her native village in North America. The "sister communities" were formed as part of Virginia's activities in 2007 to celebrate the founding of Jamestown.

== Recognition ==
In May 2004, Chesterfield was named the "17th Best Place to Live in America" by the American City Business Journals.

Since 2009, the National Association of Counties (NACo) has awarded Chesterfield County several National Achievement Awards. NACo's membership includes more than 2,000 counties nationwide, representing more than 80 percent of the nation's population. Awards won by Chesterfield County by year include:

- 2009: 10
- 2010: 5
- 2011: 12
- 2012: 11
- 2013: 10
- 2014: 15
- 2015: 11
- 2016: 18
- 2017: 17
- 2018: 17
- 2019: 7
- 2020: 14

In 2020, Chesterfield County earned 14 National Achievement Awards from the National Association of Counties. Chesterfield County recipients of these awards included:

- Citizen Information and Resources:
  - Access on Demand
  - My Chesterfield Academy
- Parks and Recreation
  - First Responders and Multicultural Community Cup
- Human Resources
  - Position Description Questionnaire Collection Project
  - Career Development Plan Program
- Libraries
  - Museum Pass Bag
  - American Creed Community Conversation
  - Thinking Money for Kids
- Mental Health Support Services
  - Coordinated Local Government Implementation of the Basics
- Planning
  - Route 1 Residential Zoning Overlay
- Procurement
  - Innovation and Efficiency Leader of the 21st Century Procurement
- Sheriff's Office
  - Legacy Lane
- Utilities
  - Call Center Training Program
  - Enhancing Technology to Benefit Customer Service Experience

== Education ==
Chesterfield County Public Schools is the local school system, and has received the U.S. Department of Education's Blue Ribbon Award.

Chesterfield County is the home to more than sixty public schools. There are 40 elementary schools, 13 middle schools, 10 high schools, and 3 technical schools for high school aged students. Each high school in Chesterfield has one to two internal schools of a specific area of interest. For example, Clover Hill High School's internal school is focused on math and science. Programs at other schools include health science (Cosby High School), International Baccalaureate (Midlothian and Meadowbrook High School), leadership and international relations (James River High School), and visual and performing arts (Thomas Dale High School), among many others. The Career and Technical Center allows high school students to attend vocational classes in various fields of interest. The goal of this school is to prepare students for future careers and post-secondary education. Some programs that the center offers include automotive, construction, and engineering courses, health and science course, personal service courses, and public safety courses. These programs are one-to-two years in duration and leave students with certifications and hands-on experience in the fields that they are interested in.

The Chesterfield Public Education Foundation, founded in 1989, is an additional funding source for Chesterfield County Public Schools. The Foundation funds programs such as scholastic, teacher recognition, and enrichment programs, as well as student scholarships.

The Chesterfield County Board of Supervisors established a library system in 1964. Chesterfield County Public Library currently has 10 branches located throughout the county.

Brightpoint Community College, a two-year institution of higher learning, has two campuses in Chesterfield County; one in Chester and one in Midlothian.

Chesterfield County is home to Virginia State University, a historically Black University located in Ettrick.

In recent years Chesterfield County public schools have begun to see an influx in the student population leading to overcrowding in the k-12 schools. This has caused many schools, like Cosby High School, to add mega trailers to their parking lots to add more class rooms, as the student population continues to grow. This has also been met with upset by both students and parents who feel their child isn't getting a proper education with larger classes and less one-on-one time with their teacher.

== Health ==
In March 2020, Chesterfield County leadership declared a local state of emergency in response to the COVID-19 pandemic at a regional press conference alongside representatives from the City of Richmond and Henrico, Hanover and Goochland counties. At that press conference, Richmond Mayor Levar Stoney announced the activation of the Central Virginia All Hazards Incident Management Team (CVAHIMT), of which Chesterfield County is a member. The CVAHIMT "was established to support the needs of the Central Virginia Region for management of major incidents and planned events that require a public safety response."

The county launched a dedicated webpage, County Response to COVID-19, as a repository of information pertaining to the virus's impact on county operations, public health guidance from the Centers for Disease Control and Prevention (CDC) and the Virginia Department of Health (VDH) as well as resources for citizens and businesses. In the following weeks, Chesterfield County took several actions to help safeguard residents, businesses and county employees against the public health risks posed by COVID-19, including closing many public offices and facilities to visitors and transitioning thousands county employees to work from home. On Thursday, March 19, 2020, Chesterfield County activated its Emergency Operations Center (EOC), which centralized county communications and coordination between departments. Additionally, the EOC provided a call center for residents and employees with general questions about county operations and services throughout the COVID-19 response.

On April 29, 2020, the Chesterfield Chamber of Commerce, on behalf of partners Chesterfield County and ChamberRVA, announced the joint initiative Relaunch Chesterfield which would focus "on issues for businesses and elected officials around the county to consider" as larger plans to reopen the commonwealth were made.

On May 13, 2020, the Chesterfield Health Department began hosting COVID-19 testing events, with tests being free for uninsured and underinsured individuals. These testing events continued into the month of June.

Chesterfield County began its phased reopening of government buildings on Monday, June 1, 2020.

== Communities ==
There are no incorporated towns in Chesterfield County.

=== Census-designated places ===
- Bellwood
- Bensley
- Bon Air
- Brandermill
- Chester
- Enon
- Ettrick
- Manchester
- Matoaca
- Meadowbrook
- Midlothian
- Rockwood
- Woodlake

=== Other unincorporated communities ===
- Belmont
- Bermuda Hundred
- Chesterfield Court House
- Deer Run
- Genito
- Gordon
- Hampton Park
- Harrowgate
- Hening
- Jefferson Davis North
- Moseley
- Reams
- Robious
- Salisbury
- Skinquarter
- South Rockwood
- Spring Run
- Winterpock

Many of these areas or communities used to have a Richmond or a Colonial Heights mailing address. Recently, they have been changed to a "North Chesterfield" or "South Chesterfield" address, respectively, due to the confusion of residents sending their personal property taxes to the above listed cities instead of Chesterfield County. However, most of Ettrick has a Petersburg mailing address.

== Notable people ==
- Aimee Mann (b. 1960) – singer-songwriter
- Vince Gilligan (b. 1967) – screenwriter and filmmaker best known for TV shows Breaking Bad (2008–2013) and Better Call Saul (2015–2022)
- Denny Hamlin (b. 1980) – NASCAR driver
- Mark Parson (b. 1986) – former NFL cornerback for the Houston Texans and New Orleans Saints
- Young M.A (b. 1992) – rapper
- Devin Robinson (b. 1995) – NBA player for Toronto Raptors
- Devin Druid (b. 1998) – actor best known for portraying Tyler Down in the TV show 13 Reasons Why
- Keldon Johnson (b. 1999) – NBA player for the San Antonio Spurs

== See also ==
- USS Chesterfield County (LST-551)
- Chesterfield County Police Department
- Chesterfield County Sheriff's Office
- National Register of Historic Places listings in Chesterfield County, Virginia
