= Manchester Turnpike =

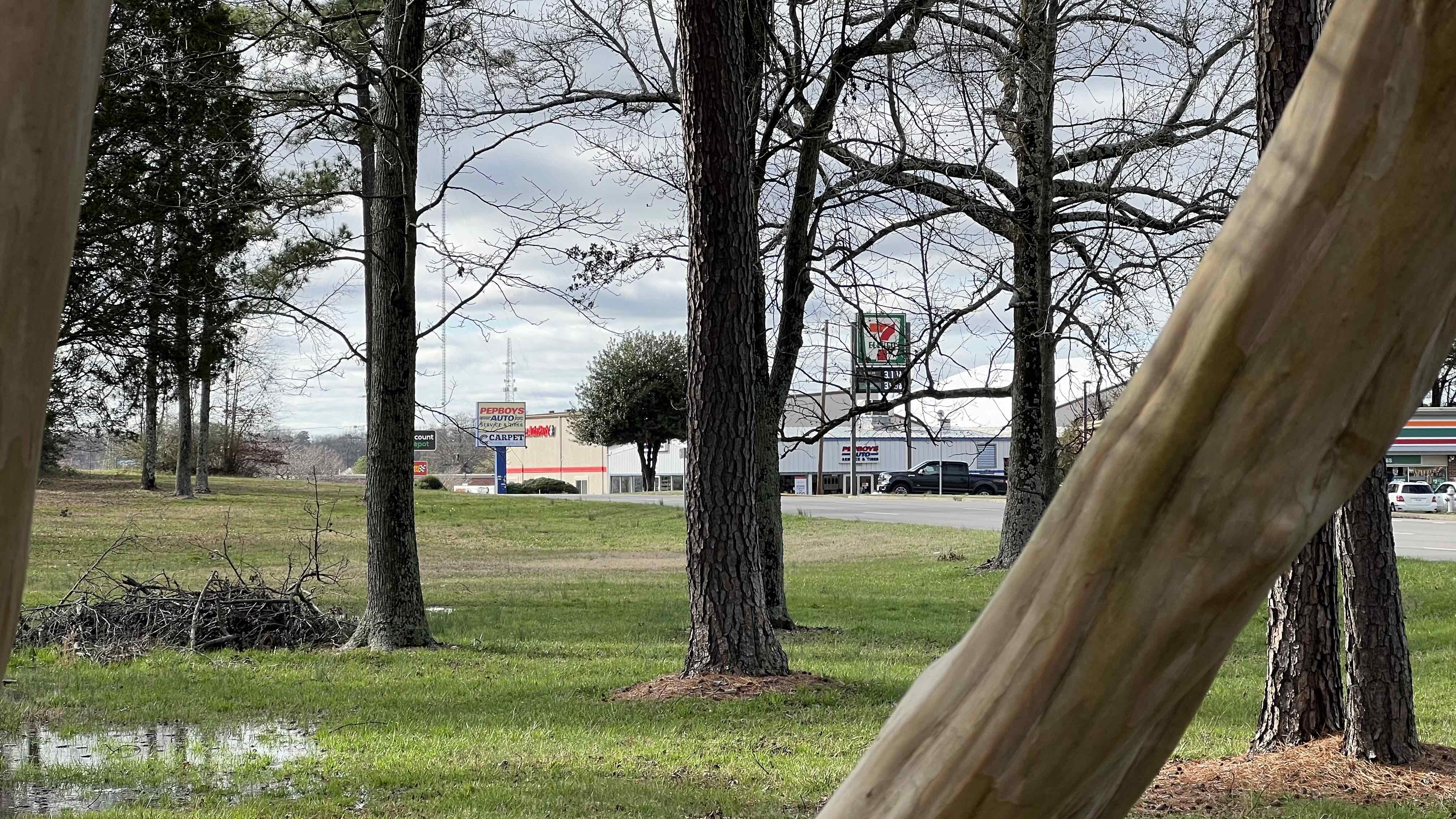
A view of Midlothian Turnpike.

The Manchester Turnpike was a turnpike in Chesterfield County in the U.S. state of Virginia, and was the first paved or artificial roadway in that state. It stretched from Manchester (now part of Richmond's Southside) west to Falling Creek near Midlothian, and is now known as Midlothian Turnpike, mostly forming part of U.S. Route 60 (US 60).

In the early 1700s, coal was first discovered in central Virginia by Huguenot settlers. Initially, the coal was mined for personal use, but as time went on, coal became a relatively large commercial business. By the end of the 18th century, Chesterfield coal was being shipped to ports all across the eastern coast of the United States. However, with the increased coal exports, the road upon which it was carted off to the port at Manchester, known as the Buckingham road, became deeply rutted by the heavy coal wagons. These ruts were a nuisance for farmers carting their produce and general travelers as well as the coal mine owners, whose wagons got stuck.

By 1802, the problem became so severe that several of Chesterfield County's coal manufacturers and residents petitioned the Virginia General Assembly for permission to construct a turnpike between the port of Manchester and Falling Creek, where the coal mines were scattered around. To remedy this, a turnpike company was incorporated by an act of the Virginia legislature on January 20, 1802. This company, called the Manchester Turnpike Company, was capitalized at $40,000 and "under the management of Benjamin Hatcher, Henry L. Biscoe, Cornelius Buck, Henry Heath, Andrew Nicholson, William Robertson, and John Cunliffe." Additionally, two toll booths were to be built at either end of the turnpike: one at the "junction between the Falling creek church road and the Buckingham road" and the other at the "junction between the Westham road, and the said Buckingham road." The toll rates were as follows: 25¢ for a loaded coal wagon, 6¢ per wheel of a regular farm wagon or carriage, and 3¢ for each horse traveling without a cart, wagon, or carriage.

The improved road was opened to coal wagons and general travelers in 1807. For about 20 years, the Manchester Turnpike had a virtual monopoly on the transportation of Chesterfield coal and many coal mine owners became very frustrated with it because at times, the price of coal would go down but the toll would not, thereby ensuring less profit for the colliers. In 1828, a new mode of transportation materialized. On February 27 of that year, the Chesterfield Railroad Company received a charter from the General Assembly to build a railroad parallel to the Manchester Turnpike. By 1831, the 13 mile road was completed and effectively put the turnpike out of business. The Manchester Turnpike served its purpose of transporting coal until a larger and better way came along.

Although the turnpike did not haul coal after the early 1830s, it still carried people traveling on the Buckingham road to Manchester and across the river to Richmond. Eventually the toll booths became discontinued and in the 1920s, the road was straightened in many places. Today Midlothian Turnpike roughly follows the route of the old Manchester Turnpike except near the western end where the old road is now known as Old Buckingham Road.
