= Chesterfield County Public Library =

Public library system in Virginia, US

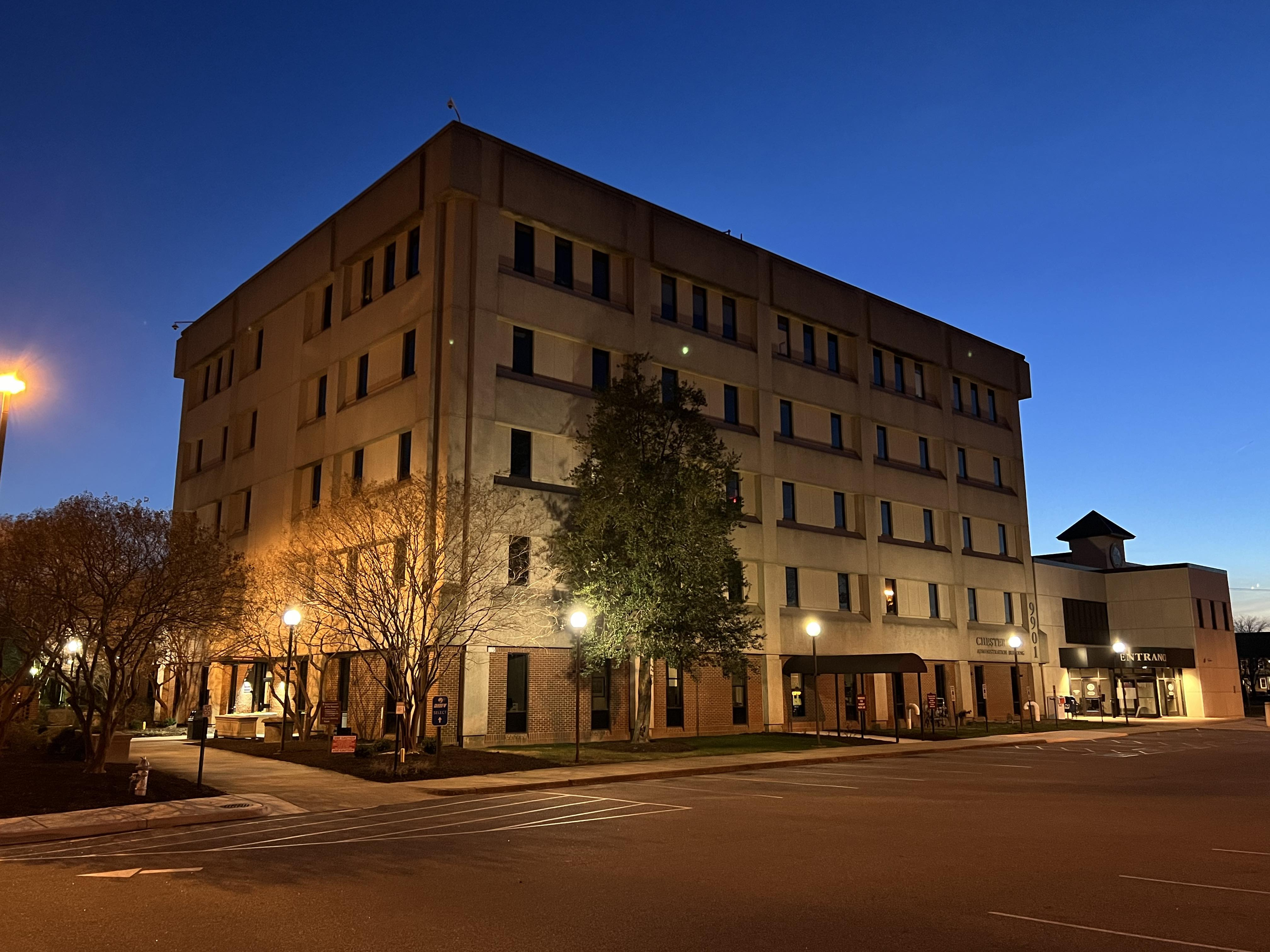
- Chesterfield County Administration Building, part of the complex where the library office is located
- Location: Chesterfield County, Virginia
- Established: 1895
- Branches: 10

Access and use
- Population served: 350,000

Other information
- Budget: US$9,347,750 (2018)
- Director: Mike Mabe
- Website: library.chesterfield.gov

Chesterfield County Public Libraries (CCPL) is a public library system in Chesterfield County, Virginia. The system contains 10 branches across the county, with the main branch being located at the Chesterfield County Government Complex.

== Branches ==
Name	Address	Image
Bon Air	9103 Rattlesnake Road, North Chesterfield, Virginia 23235	
Central (Chesterfield)	7051 Lucy Corr Boulevard, Chesterfield, Virginia 23832	
Chester	11800 Centre Street, Chester, Virginia 23831	
Clover Hill	6701 Deer Run Drive, Midlothian, Virginia 23112	
Enon	1801 Enon Church Road, Chester, Virginia 23836	
Ettrick-Matoaca	4501 River Road, South Chesterfield, Virginia 23803	
LaPrade	9000 Hull Street Road, North Chesterfield, Virginia 23236	
Meadowdale	4301 Meadowdale Boulevard, North Chesterfield, Virginia 23234	
Midlothian	100 Millworks Crossing, Midlothian, Virginia 23114	
North Courthouse Road	325 Courthouse Road, North Chesterfield, Virginia 23236	
