= Manchester, Richmond, Virginia =

Manchester
- Former Independent City
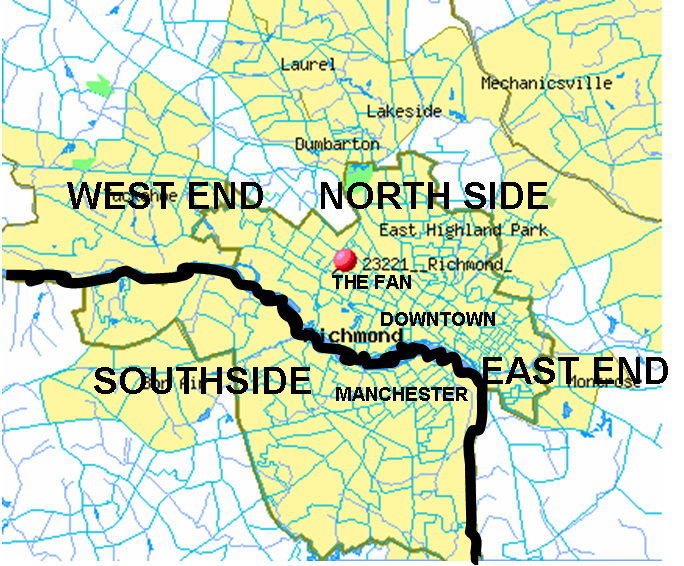
- Manchester as situated in present-day Richmond
- Country: United States of America
- State: Virginia
- County: Chesterfield (to 1874); Independent (1874–1910)
- Incorporated (town): 1769
- Incorporated (city): 1874
- Merged with Richmond: 1910
- Named for: Manchester, England

Manchester is a former independent city in Virginia in the United States. Prior to receiving independent status, it served as the county seat of Chesterfield County, between 1870 and 1876. Today, it is a part of the city of Richmond, Virginia.

Originally known as Manastoh and later Rocky Ridge, it was located on the south bank of the James River at the fall line opposite the state capital city of Richmond, on the north side of the river. Manchester was an active port city, and was a port of entry for slave ships principally in the 18th century. The port shipped out tobacco and coal which was transported 13 miles overland from the Midlothian-area mines on the Midlothian Turnpike, first paved toll road in Virginia in 1807, and the Chesterfield Railroad, the state's first in 1831. Manchester became an incorporated town in 1769 and an independent city in 1874. In 1910, it merged by mutual agreement with the larger state capital City of Richmond, achieving another "first" as the earliest of Virginia's independent cities to lose its identity.

Today, "Old Manchester" is considered a neighborhood of Richmond. Many vestiges of its past are clearly visible, notably the courthouse, the Hull Street business district, a number of historic houses, and several former railroad and street railway buildings. As part of the community's African American heritage, a "slave trail" traces the route into the downtown area from where the slave ships docked along the river. Interstate 95, and four other major highways, U.S. Routes 1, 60, 301 and 360 all cross the James River and enter downtown Richmond from Manchester.

== Rocky Ridge, seaport, mills, and railroads ==
As a result of the Second Anglo-Powhatan War, in 1645 the Virginia Colony's House of Burgesses provided for Fort Charles to be built and garrisoned at the Falls of the James, to protect the frontier. After two years, Fort Charles was relocated to the south side, to the high ground above the later Atlantic Coast Line Railroad Bridge, on a tract owned by Capt. Thomas Harris. This land was then still known by its native name, Manastoh, but was thereafter renamed Rocky Ridge by the English. Rocky Ridge in 1769 became an incorporated town on Chesterfield County, with the name of Manchester.

Manchester grew to become a major seaport in the 17th through 19th centuries, as did its neighbor Richmond on the north bank of the river. Both were located at the head of navigation of the tidal James River at the geological fall line. Above that point, the river consists of seven miles of rapids before becoming more navigable again west of Richmond, although much shallower.

Before the American Revolutionary War, tobacco industries made the town their home. It was also known as a major slave market. Manchester was commercially successful primarily due to its agricultural mills and docks.

From northwestern Chesterfield County, coal from the Midlothian area 13 miles west was transported to the docks at Manchester, first on the Manchester Turnpike, a toll road and Virginia's first graveled road of any length completed in 1807. Later, beginning in 1831, the congested turnpike was supplemented by the gravity and mule-powered Chesterfield Railroad, the first railroad in Virginia, partially engineered and funded by the Virginia Board of Public Works. For its final several miles, the line followed present-day Maury Street, which was the southern border of Manchester for many years. It crossed over the steam-powered Richmond and Petersburg Railroad (later Atlantic Coast Line Railroad) tracks (now abandoned) on a high trestle between what is now Clopton Street and Jefferson Davis Highway. When the new Richmond and Danville Railroad (R&D) was completed between Manchester and Coalfield Station (now Midlothian) in 1851, the older Chesterfield Railroad was unable to compete and portions were acquired by the R&D, with the remainder dismantled before the Civil War took place.

== County seat of Chesterfield County ==
- Manchester Courthouse
- U.S. National Register of Historic Places
- Virginia Landmarks Register
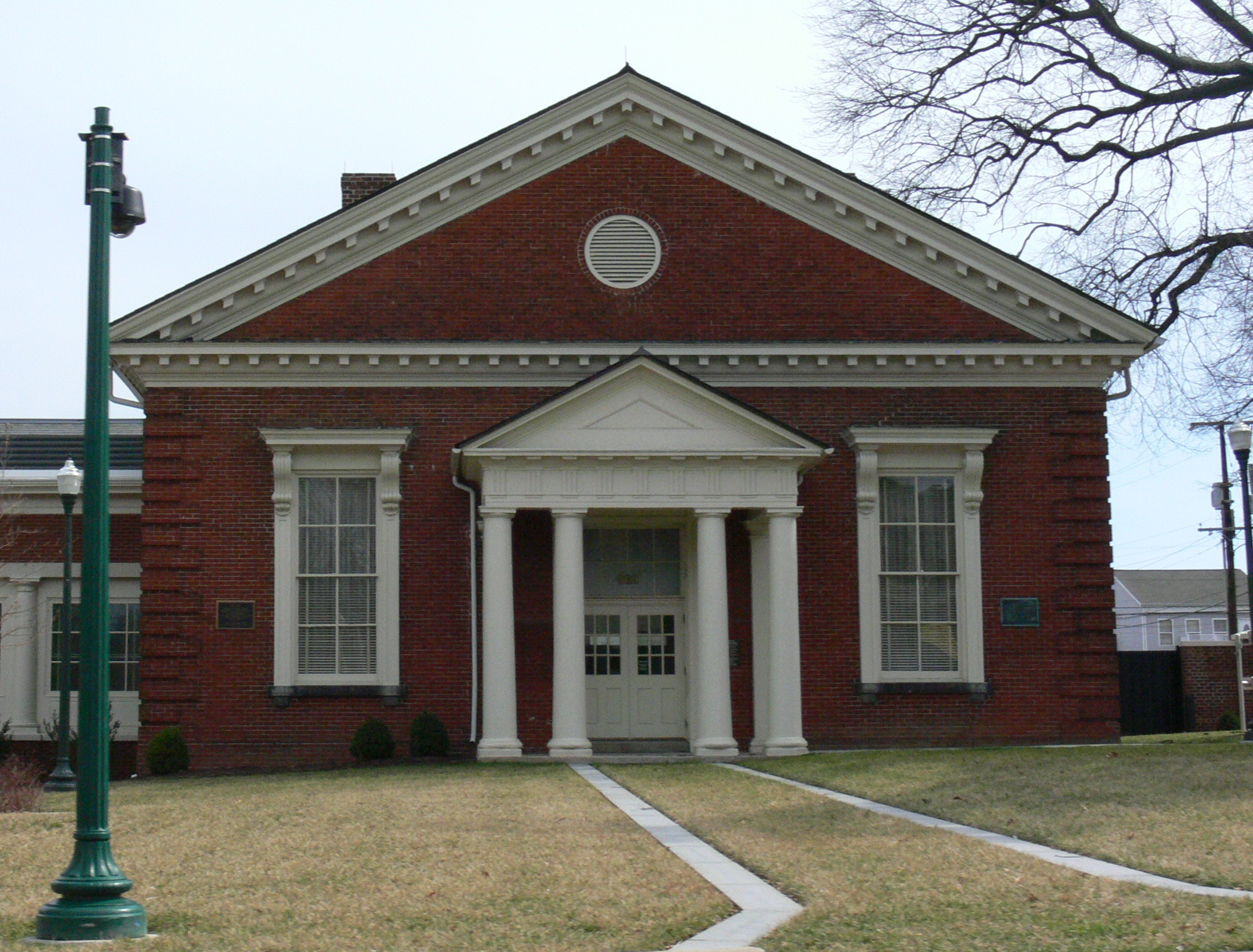
- Location: 920 Hull St., Richmond, Virginia
- Coordinates: 37°31′16″N 77°26′28″W
- Area: less than one acre
- Built: 1871
- Architect: Albert L. West
- Architectural style: Colonial Revival
- NRHP reference No.: 98000450
- VLR No.: 127-5010

Significant dates
- Added to NRHP: May 8, 1998
- Designated VLR: December 3, 1997

During Reconstruction, Manchester was briefly the county seat of Chesterfield County, from 1870 until 1876. County voters approved the move from Chesterfield Court House, Virginia, and the cornerstone of the new courthouse was laid on March 31, 1871. It was designed by Richmond-based architect A.L. West. The former courthouse complex on Hull Street is now the Manchester Division of the Richmond City courts.

Manchester became an independent city in 1874, and was therefore no longer technically located in Chesterfield County. In the election that year, county voters were again asked if they wished to relocate the county seat elsewhere, but rejected a move following a heated campaign, by a vote of 1,442 to 388. However, when the question of a move came up once again on the 1876 ballot, voters approved, 1290 to 772, a return to Chesterfield Courthouse, which became effective on July 1 that year.

== Manchester agrees to consolidate with Richmond ==
For over 250 years, the James River divided Richmond on the north bank from its sister, Manchester, located on the south bank. A major issue for Manchester and Richmond residents in the 19th and early 20th century were the toll ferries and toll bridges over the James River. The latter were subject to frequent destruction by ice floes and flooding on the river.

There were periodic talks and negotiations for over 35 years between the cities before, in 1910, Manchester agreed to a political consolidation with the much larger independent City of Richmond. Richmond's better-known name was used for both areas as it contained the location of Virginia's state capital. Two of the key features of the consolidation agreement were requirements that a free bridge across the James River be built and that the separate courthouse in Manchester be maintained indefinitely. Instead of being a barrier between neighboring cities, under the consolidation, the James River became the centerpiece of the expanded Richmond.

Today, Manchester is recognized as a historic district in state and national registers. Although Manchester is extinct as an independent city, vestiges can be found in the Manchester Bridge, Manchester Slave Trail, and the Manchester Courthouse. Manchester and other areas of the City of Richmond south of the James River are locally referred to as "South Richmond", "South Side Richmond" or simply "South Side."

== Manchester as neighborhood: industry ==
- Manchester Industrial Historic District
- U.S. National Register of Historic Places
- U.S. Historic district
- Virginia Landmarks Register
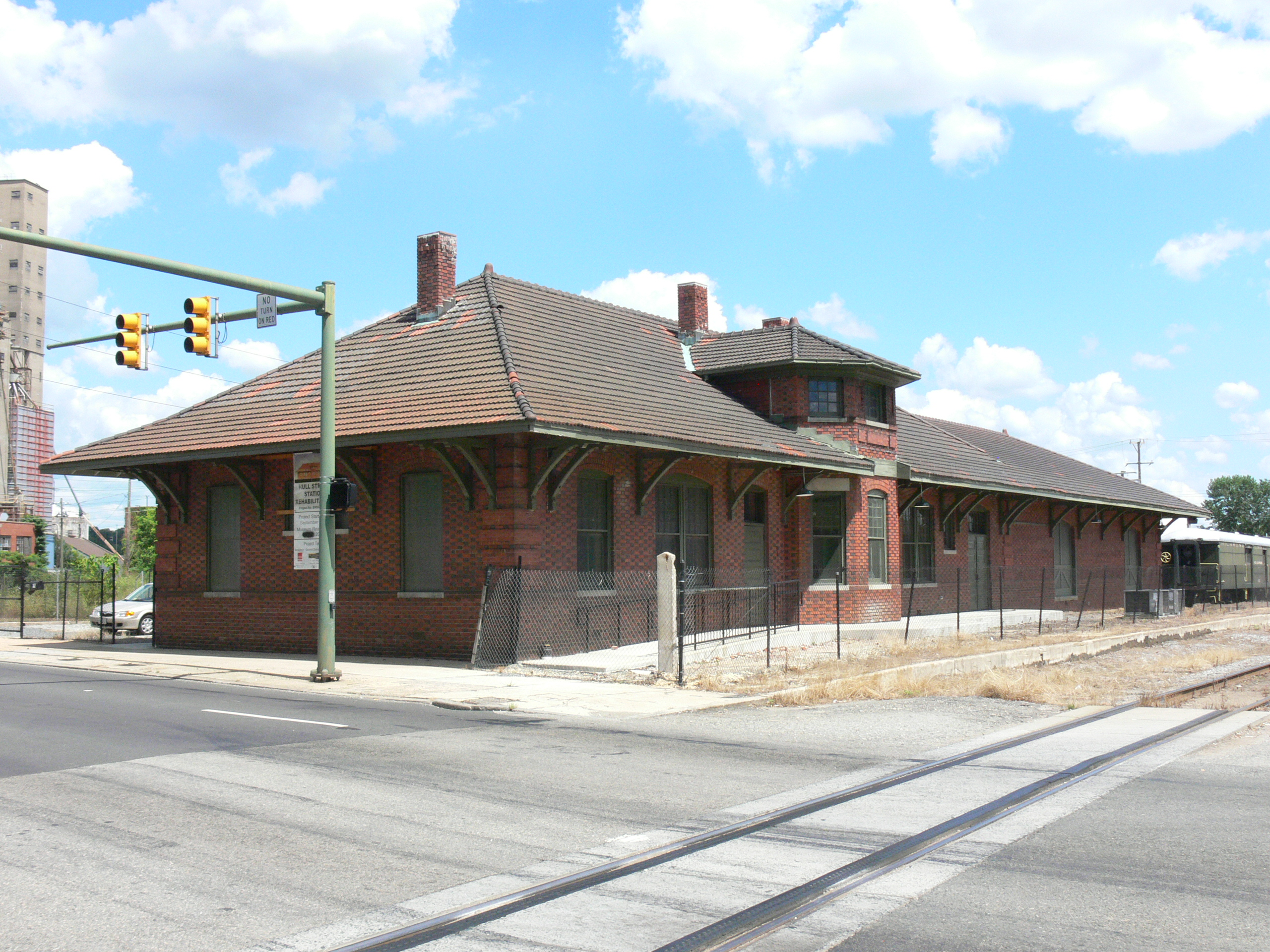
- Location: Roughly bounded by Perry St., James R., Mayo's Bridge, Maury St., and 10th St., Richmond, Virginia
- Coordinates: 37°31′35″N 77°26′13″W
- Area: 110 acres (45 ha)
- Architect: Smith, I.J., and Co.; Concrete Steel Engineering Co.
- Architectural style: Art Deco, Beaux Arts, et al.
- NRHP reference No.: 00000886
- VLR No.: 127-0457

Significant dates
- Added to NRHP: August 2, 2000
- Designated VLR: March 15, 2000, March 17, 2004, September 22, 2011

Though part of the city of Richmond, Manchester's industrial presence continued to flourish in the 20th century. Manchester was serviced by Hull Street Station on the Southern Railway, built in 1901, the only major urban depot on the southern side of the James River. The skyline is dominated by the Southern States silos, the tallest structures south of the river. Cooperative

== Manchester as neighborhood: Residential and Commercial ==
- Manchester Residential and Commercial Historic District
- U.S. National Register of Historic Places
- U.S. Historic district
- Virginia Landmarks Register
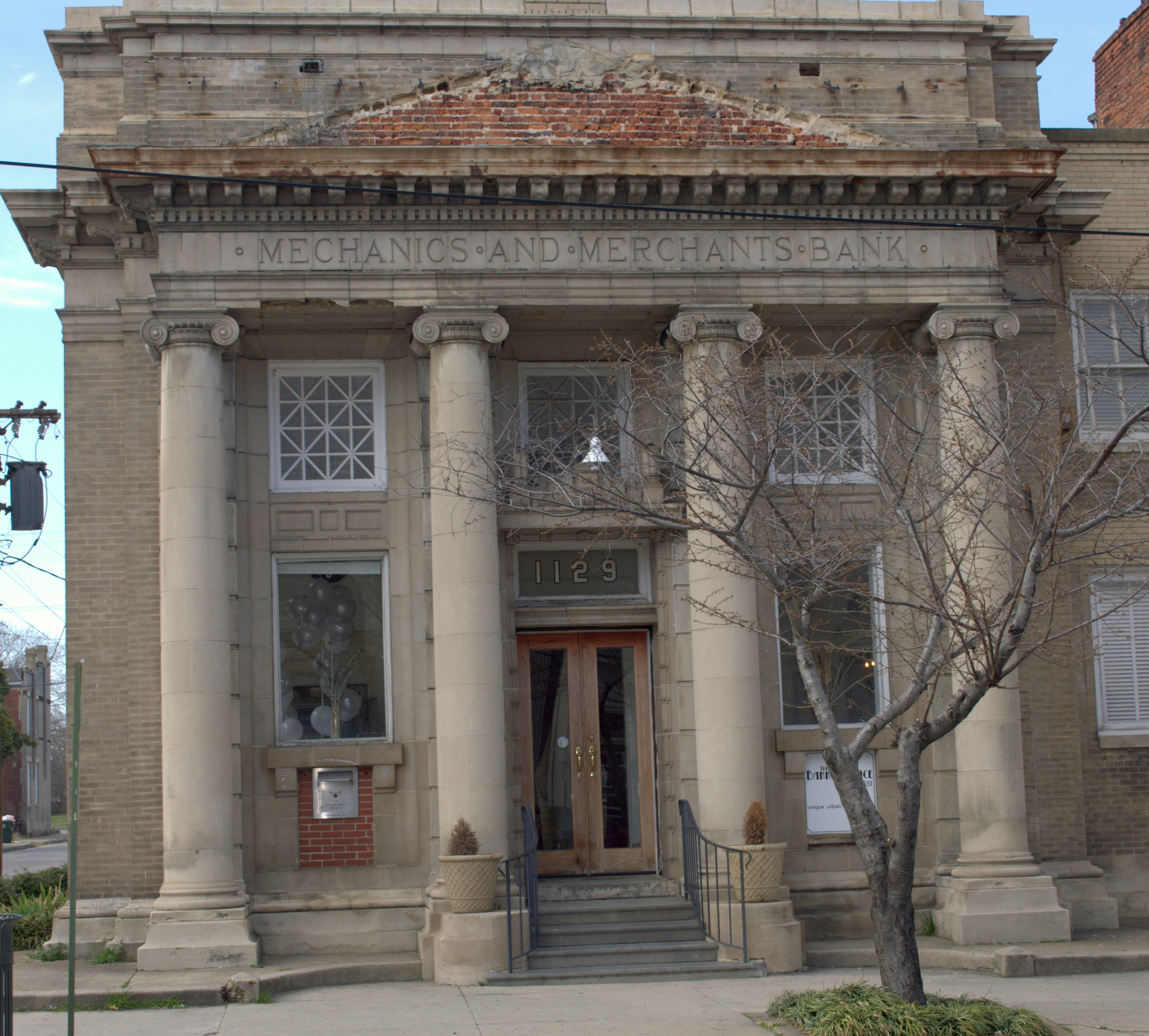
- Location: Roughly bounded by 9th St., McDonough St., Cowardin Ave., and Stockton St., Richmond, Virginia
- Coordinates: 37°31′18″N 77°26′49″W
- Architectural style: Colonial Georgian, Art Deco, Greek Revival
- NRHP reference No.: 06000976 (original); 100003308 (increase)
- VLR No.: 127-0859

Significant dates
- Added to NRHP: November 1, 2006
- Boundary increase: December 20, 2018
- Designated VLR: March 14, 2001, June 17, 2005, October 11, 2005, September 6, 2006

The Manchester Residential and Commercial Historic District is located in the city of Richmond, Virginia, on the south side of the James River. It is connected to the financial district in Richmond by the Lee, Mayo and Manchester bridges. In the 1800s, Manchester along with Richmond, had become a major port and commercial center serving the eastern seaboard and beyond. Manchester was granted city status in 1874 and became the seat of Chesterfield County. In 1910, the city of Richmond annexed Manchester.

== See also ==
- Chesterfield County
- Neighborhoods of Richmond, Virginia
- Independent city (United States)
- Former counties, cities, and towns of Virginia
