= Transportation in Richmond, Virginia =

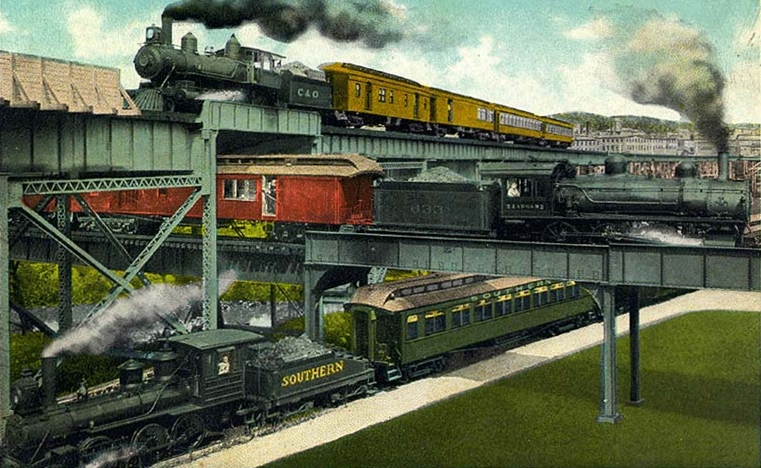
The Triple Crossing, where three railroads cross, in the city of Richmond.

Transportation in Richmond, Virginia and its immediate surroundings include land, sea and air modes. This article includes the independent city and portions of the contiguous counties of Henrico and Chesterfield. While almost all of Henrico County would be considered part of the Richmond area, southern and eastern portions of Chesterfield adjoin the three smaller independent cities of Petersburg, Hopewell, and Colonial Heights, collectively commonly called the Tri-Cities area. A largely rural section of southwestern Chesterfield may be considered not a portion of either suburban area.

Richmond-Petersburg metropolitan area is considered by many criteria to include the Tri-Cities area and many more surrounding counties, incorporated towns, and unincorporated communities. (For information on this larger area, see Richmond-Petersburg MSA).

== Transportation history ==
=== Antebellum ===
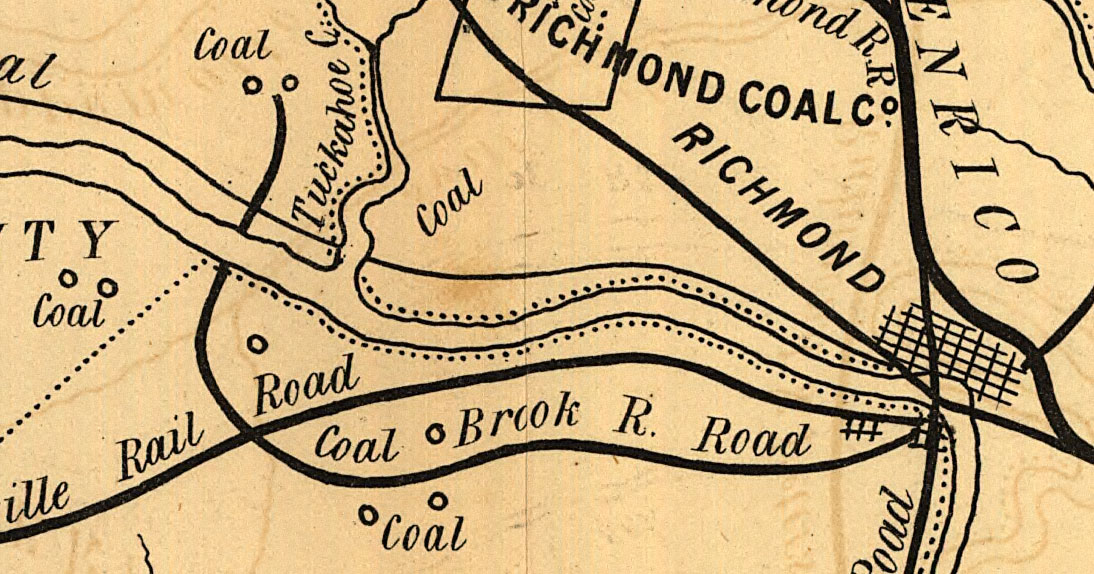
The Chesterfield Railroad was a gravity railway which transported coal from the mines in Midlothian

Richmond's transportation history dates to the early 17th century. The Virginia Colony, established at Jamestown in 1607, was dependent upon the waterways as avenues of commerce. Along the river, the James River plantations such as John Rolfe's Varina Farms had their own wharfs on the rivers. Located east of the Fall Line, they were soon shipping tobacco and other export crops abroad.

The two cities which became the modern City of Richmond were first established as ports on the north and south banks of the James River due to their location at the head of navigation on the fall line. The ports at the head of navigation became transfer points, and Richmond, on the north bank of the river, and its former neighbor Manchester, along the south bank, became points for canals which were built to bypass the falls and rapids and connect with navigable waters upstream. Transfer to and from watercraft was also undertaken as land transportation developed in the form of turnpikes and railroads.

The first stagecoach lines to Richmond were established during the War of 1812, and the first regular steamboat service began on the James River in 1815. Early the 19th century, the Virginia Board of Public Works began funding transportation infrastructure improvements, stimulating such private enterprises as the James River and Kanawha Canal, the Chesterfield Railroad, and numerous turnpikes.

By 1855, Richmond had railroads extending in many directions. Long championed in the Virginia General Assembly by Whitmell P. Tunstall, the Richmond and Danville Railroad to the southwest was completed in 1854. Others included the Virginia Central Railroad, to the west, and the Richmond and Petersburg Railroad to the south, initially from Manchester. The predecessor to the Richmond, Fredericksburg and Potomac Railroad was complete north to Potomac Creek, where it connected with steamship service via the Chesapeake Bay to Alexandria, Baltimore, and beyond.

=== Civil War ===
During the American Civil War, when Richmond served as the capital of the Confederate States of America, Richmond's railroads and connections to the other southern states were crucial to its support. Defenses at Drewry's Bluff blocked the Union Navy from access to Richmond (and its sister city Manchester) via the river. The rail connections through Petersburg were the key links which Union General Ulysses S. Grant sought to sever during the Siege of Petersburg in 1864–1865. The fall of Petersburg in April 1865 necessitated the evacuation of Richmond by Jefferson Davis and the Confederate cabinet. The Civil War effectively ended with the surrender during General Robert E. Lee's retreat a week later.

=== Reconstruction ===
After the Civil War, Richmond's (and Manchester's) transportation infrastructure was quickly rebuilt, and improvements and expansion resumed. Virginia State Engineer Claudius Crozet's innovative tunnels under the Blue Ridge Mountains became a key portion of Collis P. Huntington's Chesapeake and Ohio Railroad linking eastern Virginia to the Ohio River Valley which was completed in 1873. By 1881, Pocahontas coal was riding the rails from the mountains eastbound for export via the C&O through Richmond to coal piers at Newport News on the harbor of Hampton Roads. The James River and Kanawha Canal was conveyed to Major James H. Dooley's Richmond and Allegheny Railroad by a deed dated March 4, 1880. Railroad construction workers promptly started laying tracks on the towpath creating a new water-level rail route which was soon purchased by the C&O.

=== Streetcars ===
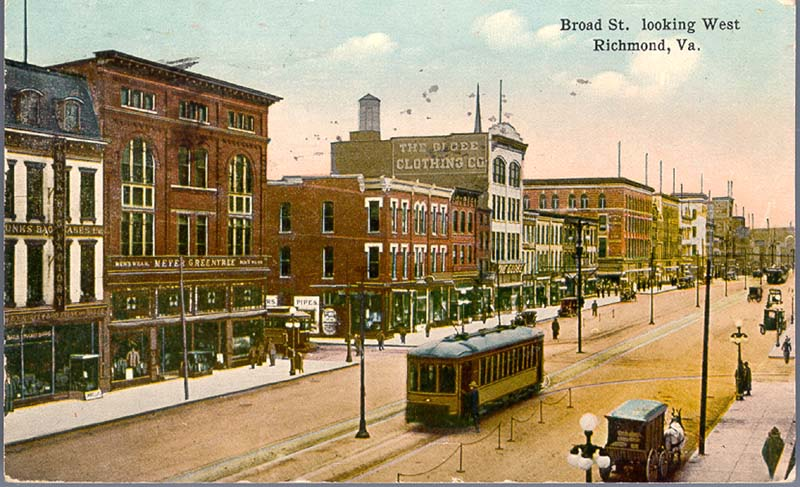
Streetcar line running down Broad Street, c. 1914

Richmond had the first successful electrically powered street railway system in the United States. Designed by electric power pioneer, Frank J. Sprague, the trolley system opened its first line in January 1888. Richmond's hills, long a transportation obstacle, were considered an ideal proving ground. The new technology soon replaced horsecars.

As part of a national trend, in the late 19th and early 20th centuries, the electrically powered street railway systems accelerated Richmond's expansion. To generate traffic and fuel sales of property, amusement parks were created at the end of the lines at Lakeside Park, Westhampton Park (now University of Richmond), and Forest Hill Park. Rails of interurban streetcar services formed a suburban network from Richmond extending north to Ashland and south to Chester, Colonial Heights, Petersburg and Hopewell. Another interurban route ran east along the Nine Mile Road and terminated at the Seven Pines National Cemetery at the end of the Nine Mile Road, where many Union Civil War dead were interred. The area's streetcar suburbs included Highland Park, Barton Heights, Ginter Park, Woodland Heights, and Highland Springs.

In 1945, the network of trams was bought up by Virginia Transit Company to close it down, almost at once, and substitute it by a bus system.

=== Early 20th century: Union stations, consolidation, bridges ===
A major issue for Manchester and Richmond residents in the 19th and early 20th century were the toll bridges over the James River. In 1910, Manchester agreed to a political consolidation with the much larger independent city of Richmond. Richmond's better-known name was used for both areas as it contained the location of Virginia's state capital. Key features of the consolidation agreement were requirements that a "free bridge" across the James River be maintained indefinitely. Instead of barrier between neighboring cities, under the consolidation, the James River became the centerpiece of the expanded Richmond. Supplementing the two free bridges near the downtown area (Mayo and Ninth Street Bridges), several additional toll bridges were constructed to the west, notably the Westham Bridge in 1911, the Boulevard Bridge in 1927, and the four-lane Robert E. Lee Memorial Bridge in 1934.

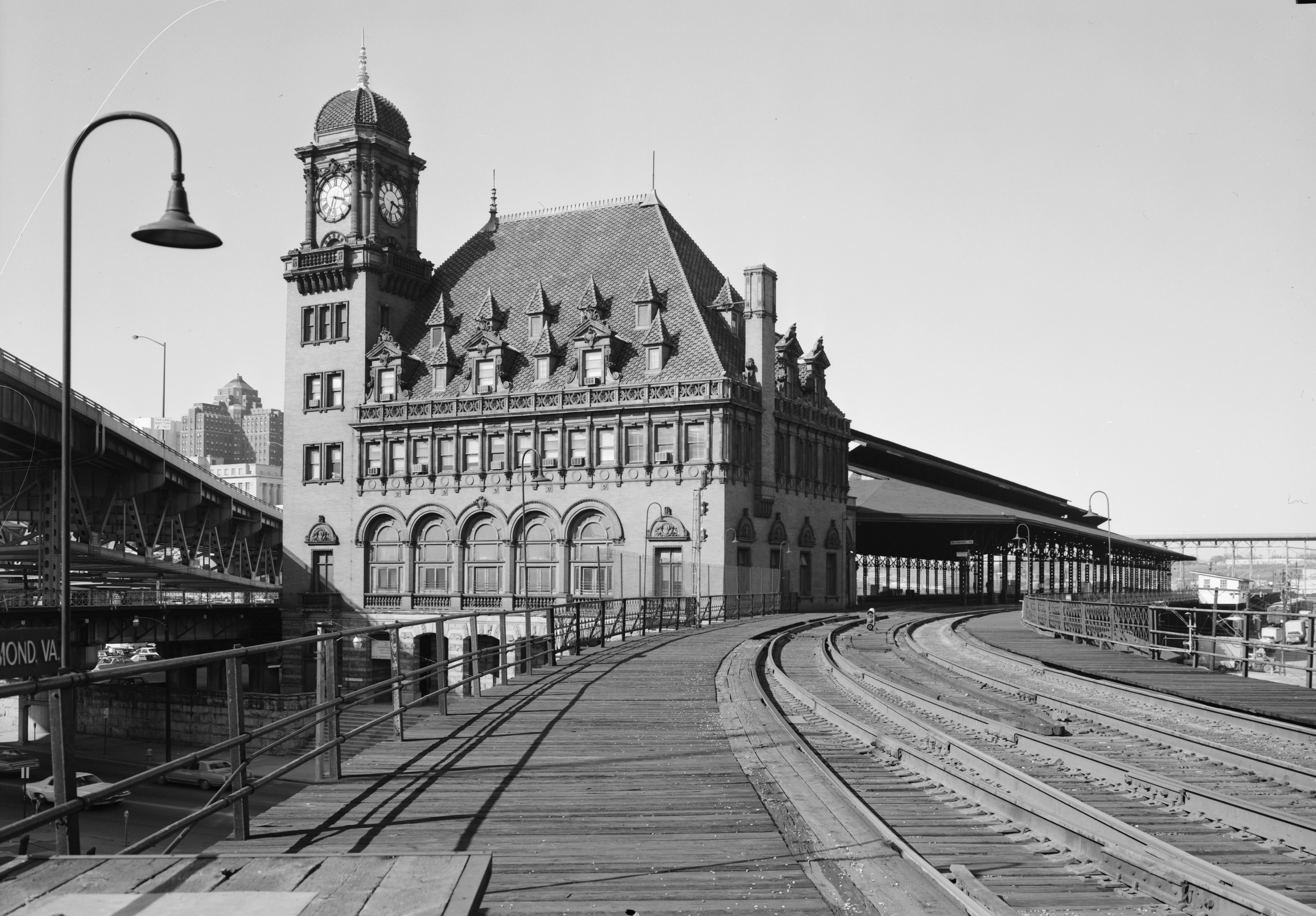
Richmond Main Street Station in 1971

Two new union railroad stations opened in Richmond during the first two decades of the 20th century. The only railroad continuing its own passenger station became the Southern Railway, with its Hull Street Station in Manchester. In 1901, Richmond's Main Street Station was built by the Seaboard Air Line Railroad and the Chesapeake and Ohio Railway. It was designed by the Philadelphia firm of Wilson, Harris, and Richards in the French Renaissance style. A new Broad Street Station was built in 1917 by the Richmond, Fredericksburg and Potomac Railroad. Broad Street Station has a huge facility, serving several railroads, notably the Atlantic Coast Line Railroad. Designed in the neoclassical style by the architect John Russell Pope, passenger service to the station ceased in 1975. The station then became the home of the Science Museum of Virginia, which remains in the substantially remodeled and expanded building. Hull Street Station is also a museum in modern-times, but after being idle and in other uses for many years, Main Street Station saw Amtrak service restored in 2003.

In 1927, the dedication of Richard Evelyn Byrd Flying Field (later known as Byrd Airport, and now Richmond International Airport) included a visit by aviator Charles Lindbergh. The airport was named after Richard E. Byrd, the famous American polar explorer born in Virginia, who was the brother of Virginia Governor Harry F. Byrd.

=== Rise of the automobile: highways and expressways ===
Also in 1927, Virginia's State Highway Department, the predecessor of the Virginia Department of Transportation (VDOT), was formed. By World War II, a network of highways linked Richmond and the surrounding region with other communities and other states.

As roads improved in the early 20th century, streetcars were unable to compete with automobiles and buses. The Richmond-Petersburg area's interurban streetcar services were gone by 1939, replaced by buses. The last streetcars ran in 1949 on the Highland Park line when they were also replaced by buses.

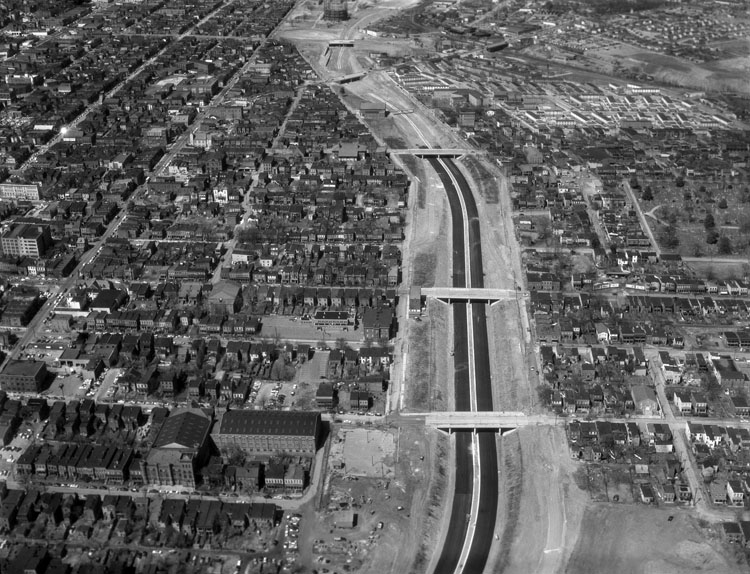
The Richmond-Petersburg Turnpike under construction in 1958

After World War II, with only four traffic lanes and long stretches of undivided roadway, the Jefferson Davis Memorial Highway became a major area of traffic congestion, as well as the site of occasional spectacular and deadly head-on collisions. In 1955, prior to the creation of the U.S. Interstate Highway System, the Virginia General Assembly created the Richmond-Petersburg Turnpike Authority as a state agency to administer the new Turnpike of the same name. The new toll road was planned with only 15 exits, and most of these were well away from the highly developed commercial areas along parallel U.S. 301. The Richmond-Petersburg Turnpike opened in 1958, and soon was granted the Interstate 95 designation through Richmond. Local automobile commuters could buy booklets of toll tickets that cost about 8 cents per toll plaza. The full (non-commuter) rate was 25 cents per mainline toll plaza, increased to 50 cents in March 1989, with lower amounts at some exits. In 1989, the exit toll plazas in the City of Richmond at the I-95/I-64/I-195 Bryan Park interchange and at VA-161 Boulevard were removed, thereby making toll-free the I-95 portion of the Turnpike north of Boulevard. The former Richmond-Petersburg Turnpike became completely toll-free on July 1, 1992.

The Richmond Metropolitan Authority was formed in 1966 by the General Assembly. The RMA was "a small state agency that was empowered to design, acquire right-of-way, construct, operate, collect tolls, and maintain the Richmond Expressway System." Eventually, the RMA built and opened the Powhite Parkway in 1973, and the Downtown Expressway in 1976 as toll roads. The RMA also acquired the Boulevard Bridge. In addition to operating and maintaining three of Richmond's toll roads and bridges, the RMA also built a downtown parking deck, operated commuter buses for a time, and owns The Diamond, a sports stadium. VDOT built the Powhite Extension (State Route 76) located in Chesterfield County as a separate toll road which opened in 1988.

The public bus systems which had replaced the local and interurban streetcars were operated by public service companies, and were dependent upon passenger fares. As ridership plummeted in the second half of the century, urban-suburban bus lines began to fail financially. By the early 1970s, only a few suburban lines were left, notably including Bon Air Transit Company extending to the suburb of Bon Air in Chesterfield County and Fairfield Transit Company, extending to Seven Pines in eastern Henrico County. The inner city company, Virginia Transit Company, was converted to become the government-owned Greater Richmond Transit (GRTC) in 1972. Privately owned commuter operators gradually discontinued services; the last privately owned suburban public route service was the Mechanicsville Bus Line route, which ended in June 2004.

Greyhound Lines and the National Trailways Bus System consolidated services formerly in downtown Richmond at a new terminal near the Boulevard exit of I-95 and I-64 in the 1980s. Early in the 21st century, the trend of route reductions which began in the 1950s was continuing.

==== Toll roads and Smart Tags ====
The Boulevard Bridge introduced commuter passes to Richmond in the form of annual permits. These initially took the form of special "topper" (add-on) license plate strips; windshield decals were used later. As stated above, much of I-95 was built as the Richmond-Petersburg Turnpike, a toll road. Commuters could purchase (much) lower cost passage, leading to local humor to the effect that through traffic from out-of-state was paying for the road, a position founded in some truth. On June 1, 1987, the Richmond Metropolitan Authority (RMA) introduced toll tokens for use on the Powhite Parkway and the Downtown Expressway. In 1994, The RMA and Virginia Department of Transportation (VDOT) conducted surveys to determine if patrons of the Downtown Expressway, the Powhite Parkway, the Powhite Parkway Extension would support Electronic Toll Collection (ETC). In late 1996, the Virginia General Assembly passed legislation requesting the RMA and VDOT to expedite the implementation of an ETC system. In studying the costs associated with ETC, RMA management determined that a toll increase would be necessary to cover the installation and higher operating expenses. The RMA, along with VDOT, implemented the ETC system -- Smart Tag—on July 1, 1999. The system became interoperable with the E-ZPass toll collection system on October 27, 2004, although Richmond Metropolitan Authority owned toll roads—Boulevard Bridge, the Downtown Expressway, and the Powhite Parkway (excluding the extension) did not begin accepting E-ZPass until August 3, 2005; E-ZPass integration had been delayed due to damages from Tropical Storm Gaston.

Today, the following toll roads exist in the Richmond area, and their tolls can all be paid for using Smart Tag/EZ Pass.

- Downtown Expressway in Richmond.
- Powhite Parkway and Powhite Parkway Extension in Richmond and Chesterfield County.
- Boulevard Bridge (the "Nickel Bridge", though it costs 35 cents now) in Richmond
- Pocahontas Parkway in Chesterfield and Henrico County.

Sources for this section:

== Highways and bridges ==
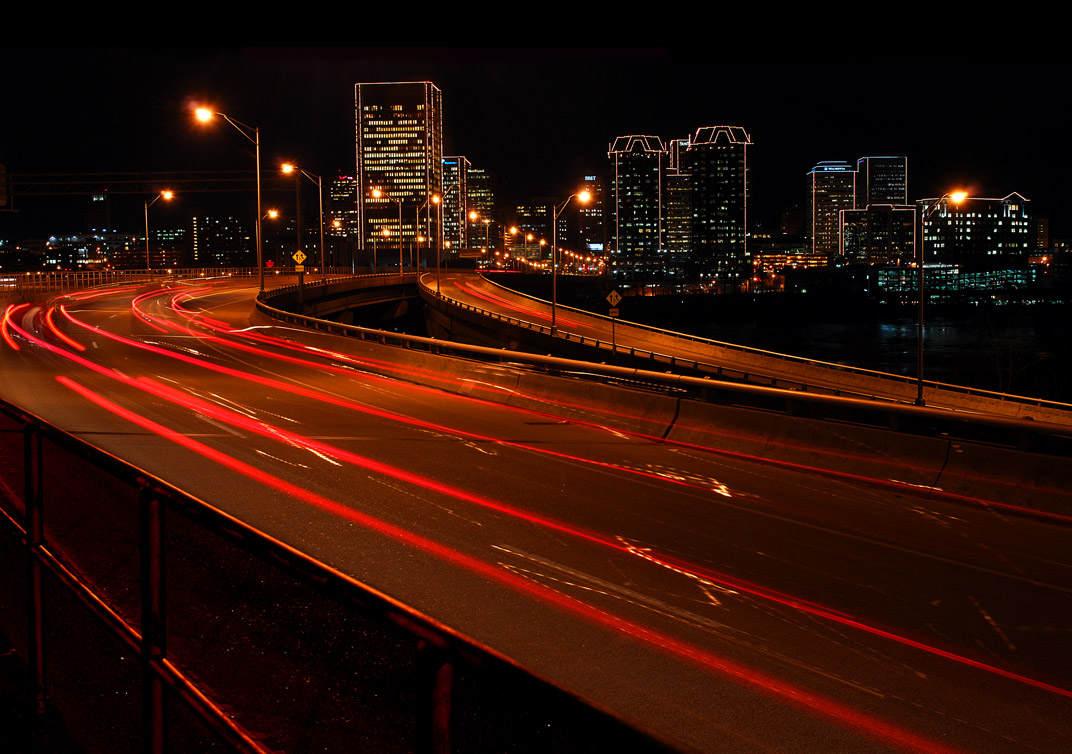
The Manchester Bridge in Downtown Richmond

=== Interstate highways, expressways ===
Richmond has an extensive network of Interstate Highways, expressways, and state highways which were built to interstate highway standards.

The major east–west route is Interstate 64 (I-64), and the major north–south route is Interstate 95 (I-95).

Three-digit Interstates are Interstate 195 (I-195, Beltline Expressway) and Interstate 295 (I-295).

Another planned route, Interstate 895 (I-895) is currently signed as State Route 895 and operated as toll road under an innovative public-private partnership. It is also known as the Pocahontas Parkway.

The Richmond Metropolitan Authority operates the Downtown Expressway and the Powhite Parkway which are toll roads. State Route 76, a toll road known as the Powhite Parkway Extension, reaches southwest into Chesterfield County between Chippenham Parkway (State Route 150) and State Route 288, the World War II Veterans Memorial Highway.

==== Outer Beltway: a virtual roadway only ====
The Richmond area does not formally have an outer "beltway", at least no combinations of routing so designated, as some of the other major metropolitan areas nearby do, such as Hampton Roads, and Northern Virginia.

However, it has several roads which effectively form major portions of a beltway. Although they do not completely encircle Richmond, these roadways aid in providing alternative routing to circumvent the downtown area for much through traffic as well as offering similar suburb-to-suburb pathways for more local travelers in the greater Richmond-Petersburg metropolitan area.

These highways are:

- Interstate 295 from I-64 west of Richmond southeasterly to State Route 895 east of Richmond (25 miles)
- State Route 288 in the southwest and western areas, between I-95 south of Richmond and I-64 west of the city. (30.7 miles)

A full outer beltway loop, approximately 70 miles long, could be designated by combining the preceding major sections with:

- State Route 895 (Pocahontas Parkway) toll road (8.8 mi)
- an existing 5-mile section of I-95 south of Richmond
- an existing 2-mile section of I-64 west of Richmond

The only tolls along such a "virtual beltway" of Richmond would be on the State Route 895 portion, which includes the modern and costly to build high-rise Vietnam Veterans Memorial Bridge over the shipping channel of the navigable portion of the James River below the Port of Richmond.

=== U.S. highways ===
Major U.S. highways in the Richmond area:

- US 1 north portion is Washington Highway; south portion is Jefferson Davis Highway (concurrent with US 301)
- US 33
- US 60 east of Richmond called Williamsburg Road; west of Richmond the road is known as Midlothian Turnpike
- US 250 Broad Street and Broad Street Road
- US 301 north portion is Chamberlayne Ave and Chamberlyane Road; south portion is Jefferson Davis Highway (concurrent with US 1)
- US 360 east of Richmond called Mechanicsville Turnpike; west of Richmond it is known as Hull Street and Hull Street Road

=== State highways ===
The Richmond area has state highways and secondary routes, some of which are state-designated Virginia byways.

A partial listing of Virginia State Highways include:

- State Route 2 (multiplexed with US-301 in Henrico)
- State Route 5 (a National Scenic Byway)
- State Route 6 (Patterson Avenue)
- State Route 10 (Broad Rock Road)
- State Route 33 (Nine Mile Road)
- State Route 73 (Parham Road)
- State Route 76 (Powhite Parkway Extension toll road)
- State Route 147 (Cary Street Road, Huguenot road)
- State Route 150 (Chippenham Parkway)
- State Route 161 (south portion also known as Belt Boulevard)
- State Route 195 (short connector)
- State Route 197 (Malvern, Westwood, and Laburnum Avenues)
- State Route 288 (World War II Veterans Memorial Highway)
- State Route 895 (Pocahontas Parkway toll road)

=== Major bridges ===
The James River bisects the metropolitan area. It enters from the west, but turns due south at downtown Richmond for about 8 miles, before it turns east again.

From the west, the bridges across the James River in the Greater Richmond area are:

- World War II Veterans Memorial Bridge (VA-288)
- Edward E. Willey Bridge (VA-150)
- Huguenot Memorial Bridge (VA-147)
- Powhite Parkway Bridge (Powhite Parkway and VA-76) (toll bridge)
- CSX A-line railroad bridge (formerly Atlantic Coast Line Railroad)
- Boulevard Bridge (VA-161) (toll bridge, restricted weights)
- Robert E. Lee Memorial Bridge (US-1 and US-301)
- Manchester Bridge (US-60)
- Norfolk Southern Railway bridge (formerly Southern Railway)
- Mayo Bridge (US-360)
- CSX S-line railroad bridge (formerly Seaboard Air Line Railroad)
- Interstate 95 James River Bridge (I-95)
- Vietnam Veterans Memorial Bridge (Pocahontas Parkway and VA-895) (toll bridge)
- Varina-Enon Bridge (I-295)

== Local public transportation ==
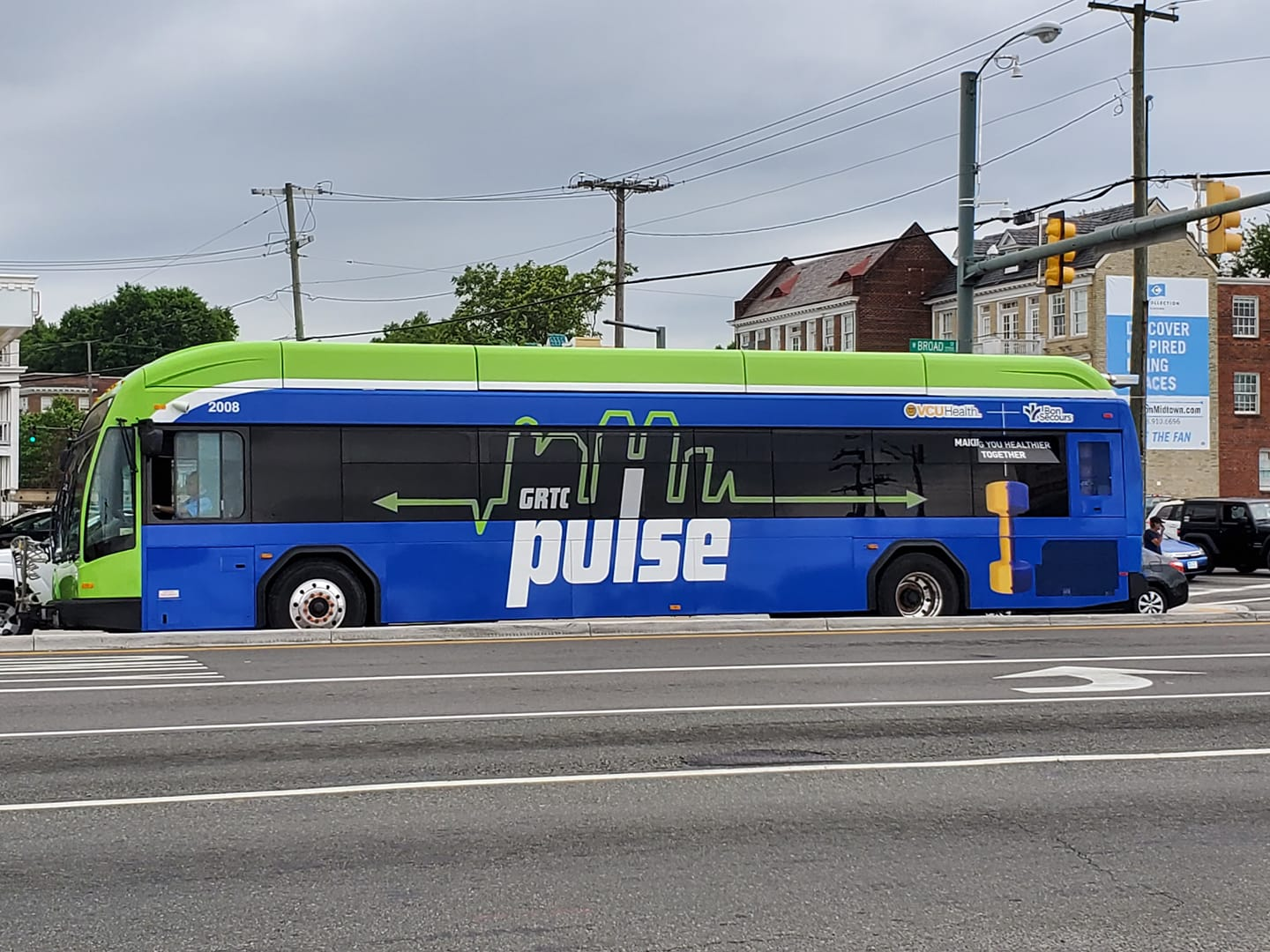
A GRTC Pulse bus in operation in Richmond.

=== Bus and paratransit systems ===
Greater Richmond Transit Company (GRTC) is a publicly owned public service company providing public bus service within the Greater Richmond area. It receives principal funding from the Federal Transit Administration, Virginia Department of Rail and Public Transportation, and local municipalities. However, GRTC is managed, staffed, and operated by a private transit management company; GRTC Transit Services, Inc., the operating company, is a subsidiary of American Transportation Enterprises, and has managed GRTC since 1962.

Public transportation in Greater Richmond is limited, with GRTC bus routes available only within the city limits and in bordering areas of Henrico and Chesterfield counties. Henrico service runs only on weekdays; service in Chesterfield is limited to two state-funded rush-hour express services only. Hanover County and parts of northern, eastern and western Henrico have no transit service.

GRTC also provides express bus service to Petersburg, which connects to Petersburg Area Transit which serves the Tri-Cities area.

GRTC's paratransit service in Richmond and Henrico County is provided by the CARE service, which is operated under contract by Laidlaw Transit, Inc. Other private companies offer wheelchair-accessible paratransit service to individuals and small groups.

==== Bus rapid transit ====
Since 2018, Richmond, Virginia has been served by a bus rapid transit line along the Broad and Main Street corridors. The western terminus is in Willow Lawn, which is located in suburban Henrico County, while the eastern terminus ends in Rockets Landing, in the eastern part of the city of Richmond. It is the third bus rapid transit line built in Virginia, and the first rapid transit system to serve the city in almost 60 years.

=== Rail mass transit ===
Although no rail mass transit services are currently operational, Richmond has been considering plans for a small streetcar system in the downtown area for several years.

Presently, an organization known as the Central Virginia Transportation Authority (CVATA) is aiming to bring commuter rail, light rail and a heritage streetcar into the Greater Richmond Region. The main lines would be called Central Virginia Express.

=== Taxi and airport limousine service ===
Richmond has numerous taxicab operators, mostly operated as small businesses, River City Transportation, amongst others, provides limousine/SUV/ Car services for individuals and groups between the airport and points in the Richmond area and beyond, including other major airports and cities in Virginia.

== Intercity bus services ==
Intercity bus service is provided by the following carriers, with its terminal at 2910 N Boulevard:

- Greyhound Lines - multiple destinations
- New Century Travel - to New York, Washington, Philadelphia
- Today's Bus - to New York
- Eastern Shuttle - to New York
- Apex - to New York (stop located in Henrico County)
- megabus.com - express service to Washington D.C., Philadelphia, Hampton, Atlanta, Athens, Baltimore, Charlotte, Columbia, Durham, Fayetteville, Newark and connections to New York.

== Railroads ==
=== Passenger rail ===
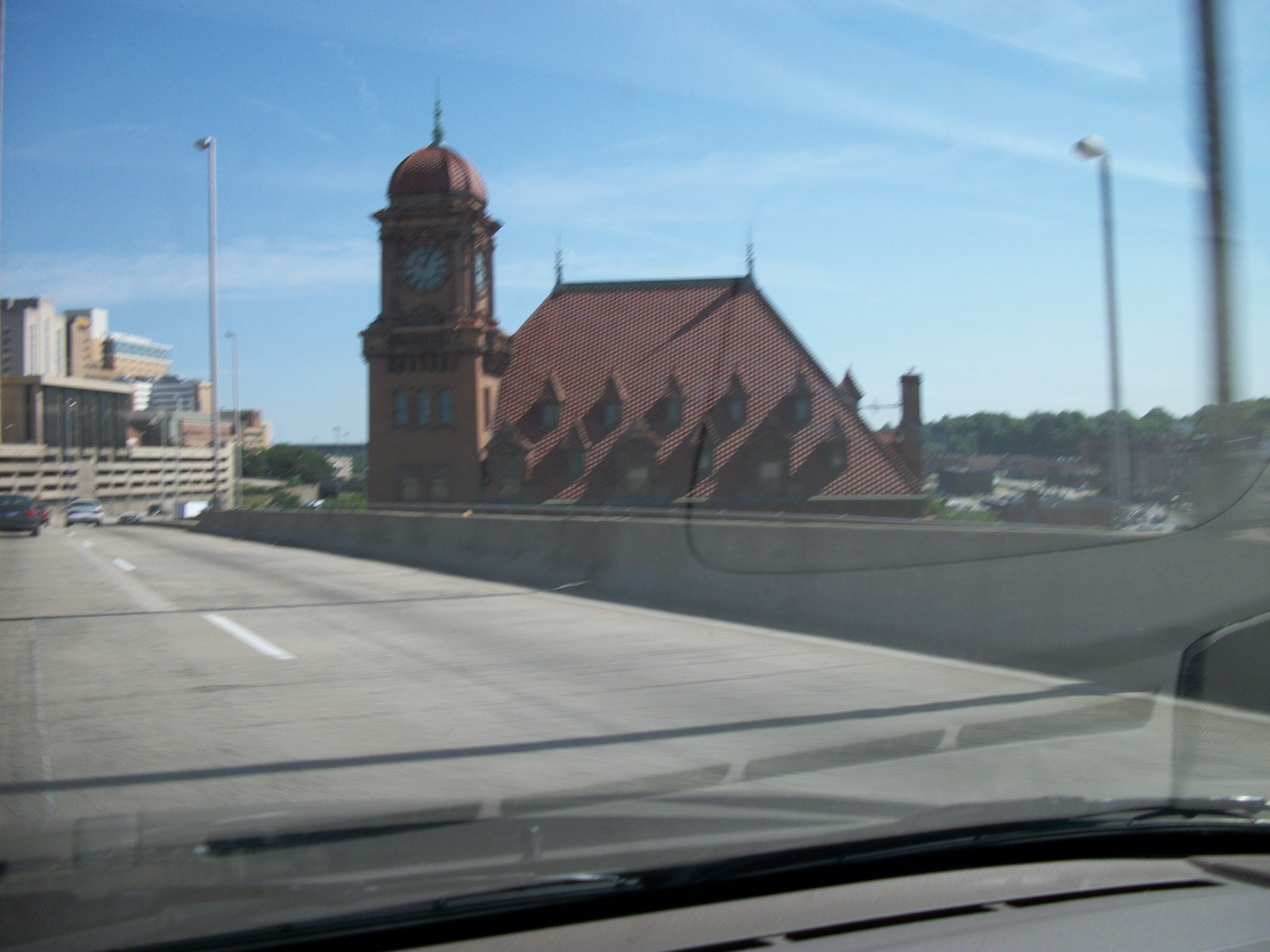
Main Street Station, as seen from I-95.

The Richmond area has two railroad stations served by Amtrak. Each station receives regular service from north of Richmond from Washington, DC, Philadelphia, and New York. The suburban Staples Mill Road Station is located on a major north–south freight line and receives all service to and from all points south including, Raleigh, Durham, Savannah, Newport News, Williamsburg and Florida. Richmond's only railway station located within the city limits, the historic Main Street Station, was renovated in 2004. As of 2010, the station can only receive trains headed to and from Newport News and Williamsburg due to track layout. As a result, the Staples Mill Road station receives more trains and serves more passengers overall.

The Department of Rail and Public Transportation of the State of Virginia has studies underway for introducing improved passenger rail service to the Virginia Peninsula and South Hampton Roads areas. The Transdominion Express would serve a large portion of the south central regions of the state. There are plans to create high-speed rail corridors through the state connecting to both the Northeast Corridor and the Southeast High Speed Rail Corridor.

=== Freight railroads ===
Richmond is served by two major Class I railroads, Norfolk Southern (NS) and CSX. The city is also served by the Buckingham Branch Railroad, the state's largest short line railroad. Rail yards in Richmond include NS's Ship Yard and CSX's Fulton Yard.

== Air ==
Richmond is served by a major commercial airport and several smaller general aviation facilities. Richmond is served by the Richmond International Airport (IATA: RIC, ICAO: KRIC), located in nearby Sandston, seven miles southeast of Richmond and within an hour drive of historic Williamsburg, Virginia, RIC airport is served by seven airlines with non-stop flights to 21 destinations and connecting flights to destinations worldwide. In 2004, the airport served approximately 2.5 million passengers; this count is expected to increase significantly in 2006 due to the presence of low-cost carriers AirTran Airways and JetBlue Airways.

Richmond International Airport is not served by public transit, other than a little-used GRTC bus route from downtown that runs only five times per day, during the morning and afternoon rush hour Monday through Friday. As is the case everywhere in Richmond, driving to the airport (either by taxicab or private car) is by far the fastest mode of transportation. RIC is approximately a $15 taxi fare from downtown Richmond. Parking is available in long-term lots for $6 per day, the close-in daily garage for $10 per day, and the hourly garage for $2 per hour (first 60 minutes free).

General Aviation service is available at Richmond International and Chesterfield County Airport, located near the intersection of State Routes 10 and 288 near Chesterfield Court House, Virginia, and Hanover County Airport near Ashland.

== Ports and waterways ==
The Port of Richmond (locally known as Deepwater Terminal) offers deep water connections on the navigable portion for the James River east to Hampton Roads, known as the "world's greatest natural harbor", which is located only 18 miles from the Atlantic Ocean. Shipping to other points on the Chesapeake Bay is also possible.

The extant canals of Richmond are no longer used for shipping. However, several portions downtown are used as part of the Canal Walk, and upstream, portions are used as part of the water systems of the city and counties. A set of locks is located in a small park just east of the downtown area near Tobacco Row.

== See also ==
- GRTC Bus Rapid Transit Line
- Plug-in electric vehicles in Virginia § Richmond
