= List of former primary state highways in Virginia (Richmond District) =

The following is a list of former primary state highways completely or mostly within the Richmond District (VDOT District 4) of the U.S. state of Virginia.

== SR 33 Alternate ==
State Route 33 Alternate
- Location: Glen Allen
- Existed: 1928–1942

State Route 33 Alternate was a loop off US 33 near Glen Allen, following Old Courtney Road, Courtney Road, and Mountain Road (including Old Mountain Road, cut by I-295). It was added to the state highway system in 1928 and 1930 as part of SR 420, which became SR 4 in the 1933 renumbering and US 33 in 1937. A new shorter alignment of SR 4 was added in 1935, creating State Route 4 Alternate on the old road; this was renumbered SR 33 Alt. when SR 4 became US 33. SR 33 Alt. was transferred to Henrico County in 1942 by a state law that also added SR 161 north of SR 356.

== SR 44 ==
State Route 44
- Location: Jefferson-Robious
- Existed: 1928–1952

State Route 44 followed what is now State Route 711 (Huguenot Trail and Robious Road) from US 522 at Jefferson east to SR 147 at Robious. Most of SR 711 is a Virginia Byway. The portion in Powhatan County was named for the French Huguenot immigrants to the Virginia Colony who settled the area in the late 17th and early 18th centuries to escape religious persecution in their homeland of France.

State Route 419 was created in 1928 as an extension of SR 417 (former SR 191, now US 522 south from Maidens) for about 10 miles (16 km) east from Jefferson. It was extended a further 1.5 miles (2.4 km) in 1929 and the remaining 8 miles (13 km) to Robious in 1930. SR 417 (Maidens-Jefferson) became part of SR 419 in 1931 or 1932, but in the 1933 renumbering the route was again split at Jefferson, with former SR 417 becoming part of an extended SR 49 and Jefferson-Robious becoming SR 44.

SR 44 was downgraded to secondary SR 711 in 1952. A Virginia Byway was designated in 1990, following SR 711 from Jefferson to about 1 mile (1.6 km) short of Robious, then SR 673 (Old Gun Road) to SR 147 inside Richmond city limits. A branch was included on SR 617 (Old River Trail) from SR 711 about 2 miles (3.2 km) east of Jefferson northwest to US 522 at Michaux.

Major intersections

County	Location	mi	km	Destinations	Notes
Powhatan	Jefferson	0.00	0.00	US 522 (Maidens Road) – Powhatan, Goochland	
Powhatan				SR 617 / Virginia Byway (Old River Trail)	
Powhatan				SR 288 – Goochland, Chesterfield	interchange; opened 2004
Chesterfield				SR 673 / Virginia Byway (Old Gun Road)	
Chesterfield	Robious	18.68	30.06	SR 147 (Huguenot Road) / SR 675 (Robious Road) to US 60 – Richmond	
1.000 mi = 1.609 km; 1.000 km = 0.621 mi

== SR 139 ==
State Route 139
- Location: Brodnax-south
- Existed: 1932–1942

State Route 139 extended south from US 58 in Brodnax for 3.95 miles (6.36 km) along current secondary SR 659 in the direction of Ebony and the North Carolina state line (where, if it followed what was once SR 659 all the way, it would connect to what is now NC 903). It was added to the state highway system in 1932 as State Route 442, became SR 139 in the 1933 renumbering, and was downgraded to secondary in 1942 as an extension of existing SR 659.

== SR 140 ==
State Route 140
- Location: Edgerton-Nottoway River
- Existed: 1922–1949

State Route 140 extended south from US 1 at the Nottoway River along the old Brunswick and Roanoke Plank Road via Smoky Ordinary to US 58 at Edgerton (this part is now secondary SR 712, which extends barely south from US 58 to end at SR 606), then west overlapping US 58 and south along part of SR 670 to SR 606 (also part of the old plank road) near the Lawrenceville-Brunswick Municipal Airport. SR 712 is part of the Jefferson Davis Highway as defined in 1922.

The road north of US 58 was defined as part of SR 1 in 1922 (that route being moved off its original alignment via Warfield to Lawrenceville), becoming SR 31 in 1933 and State Route 122 (a spur of SR 12, now US 58) in 1925 when SR 31 was moved to the modern US 1 corridor. SR 122 became State Route 402 in the 1928 renumbering, and in 1931 the short piece of road south of US 58 became State Route 438. SR 402 and SR 438 both became SR 140 in the 1933 renumbering. The latter was downgraded to secondary in 1942 as an extension of existing SR 670 and the former in 1949 as SR 712.

Major intersections

The entire route is in Brunswick County.

Location	mi	km	Destinations	Notes
	0.00	0.00	SR 606 (Brooks Crossing Road)	
	0.85	1.37	US 58 west (Governor Harrison Highway)	south end of US 58 overlap
Edgerton	0.00	0.00	US 58 east (Governor Harrison Highway)	north end of US 58 overlap
	13.00	20.92	US 1 (Boydton Plank Road) – Rawlings, McKenney	
1.000 mi = 1.609 km; 1.000 km = 0.621 mi

== SR 141 ==
State Route 141
- Location: Dinwiddie Court House-Carson
- Existed: 1930–1943

State Route 141 extended east from US 1 at Dinwiddie Court House along current secondary SR 703 and SR 604 to US 301 at Carson, just west of I-95 exit 37. State Route 141Y followed SR 604 and SR 673 from SR 141 north and east to US 301.

The westernmost 7 miles (11 km) were added to the state highway system in 1930 as State Route 426, which was extended another 1.8 miles (2.9 km) in 1931 and 6.1 miles (9.8 km) in 1932, taking it to the Dinwiddie-Prince George County line at Carson. SR 426 became SR 141 in the 1933 renumbering, and in October 1933 the extension to US 301 was added, as was the wye connection. and was downgraded to secondary in 1943. (The portion of SR 141 and SR 141Y from SR 618 in Dinwiddie County to SR 604 in Prince George County had been part of SR 24 (now US 301) until about 1929.) SR 141 and SR 141Y were downgraded to secondary in 1943.

Major intersections

County	Location	mi	km	Destinations	Notes
Dinwiddie	Dinwiddie CH	0.00	0.00	US 1 (Boydton Plank Road) – Petersburg National Battlefield Five Forks Unit, Dinwiddie CH	
Prince George	Carson			SR 141Y (Halifax Road)	now SR 604
Prince George	Carson	12.67	20.39	US 301 (South Crater Road)	
1.000 mi = 1.609 km; 1.000 km = 0.621 mi

== SR 143 ==
State Route 143
- Location: Nottoway-northeast
- Existed: 1932–1942

State Route 143 extended northeast from US 460 (now US 460 Bus.) in Nottoway for 1.7 miles (2.7 km) along current secondary SR 728, SR 625 (cut by the new US 460 bypass), and SR 646. It was added to the state highway system in 1932 as State Route 444, became SR 143 in the 1933 renumbering, and was downgraded to secondary in 1942 as extensions of existing SR 625 and SR 646.

== SR 146 ==
State Route 146
- Location: Richmond-Oakland
- Existed: 1930–1966

State Route 146 was an alternate route for SR 5 traffic from within Richmond city limits south to Oakland. Its initial alignment, created in 1930 as State Route 430, roughly followed the old Richmond and Osborne's Turnpike (now the SR 5 corridor), while SR 41 (which became SR 5 in 1933) used the present New Osborne Turnpike. However, the turnpike's crossing of the Chesapeake and Ohio Railway's Peninsula Subdivision on 37th Street had been closed to build Fulton Yard, so SR 430 jogged west on Bickerstaff Road and north to the city limits where SR 5 now crosses, at what was then 35th Street. Inside Richmond, the alignment was defined in 1932 to turn east on Louisiana Street and end at SR 41, which was then on Fulton Street. SR 430 became SR 146 in the 1933 renumbering.

In 1949, SR 5 was realigned in Richmond. Where it had formerly used Fulton Street and a now-abandoned roadway through Gillies Creek Park and Chimborazo Park to meet US 60 at Government Road and 36th Street, it now followed Louisiana Street west to Lester Street (now Old Main Street), and then followed Lester, Main, and 25th Streets to US 60 at Broad Street. At the same time, SR 5 and SR 146 switched alignments south of Louisiana Street, with SR 5 replacing SR 146 on Old Osborne Turnpike (the jog at Bickerstaff Road had been removed in the early 1940s) and SR 146 moving to New Osborne Turnpike, Newton Road, Hatcher Street, Williamsburg Road, and Fulton Street, from which it turned west on Louisiana Street to end at 35th Street (still SR 5). At some point, SR 146 was removed from Fulton Street, following Williamsburg Road directly to Louisiana Street. In 1966, the road outside Richmond was turned over to Henrico County for maintenance, and inside Richmond it became ordinary city streets, at the same time as current SR 197 was created.

== SR 148 ==
State Route 148
- Location: Scotts Fork-Chula Junction-north
- Existed: 1928–1951

State Route 148 extended north from SR 38 at Scotts Fork along current SR 153 to US 460, then west overlapping US 460 to Chula Junction and north on current secondary SR 604, via Chula, to the Appomattox River near Genito.

6 miles (9.7 km) north from Chula Junction were added to the state highway system in 1928 as State Route 412, which was extended the remaining 1.2 miles (1.9 km) to the Appomattox River in 1929. The route became SR 148 in the 1933 renumbering, with a description stating the north end was in the direction of US 60, but without any details. In 1943, SR 148 was extended south to Scotts Fork, replacing SR 607, in order to serve traffic between Richmond and Camp Pickett, but only a year later the original SR 148 was downgraded to secondary SR 604. (The new number came from the route it connected to across the Appomattox River in Powhatan County; what had been SR 604 south of Amelia Court House was renumbered 607, a designation freed the previous year by the extension of SR 148.) State Route 148 survived on its 1943 extension until 1951, when it was renumbered as a realignment of SR 153 (which had turned west on SR 38 at Scotts Fork).

Major intersections

The entire route is in Amelia County.

Location	mi	km	Destinations	Notes
Scotts Fork			SR 153 (Military Road / Five Forks Road) / SR 602 (Bevils Bridge Road) – Blackstone, Fort Pickett, Amelia	SR 602 was originally planned as SR 153
			US 460 east (Colonial Trail Highway) – Richmond	south end of US 460 overlap
Chula Junction			US 460 west (Colonial Trail Highway) – Amelia	north end of US 460 overlap
Masons Corner			SR 616 (Genito Road)	to former SR 149
			SR 604 (Genito Road) to US 60	Genito Bridge over Appomattox River (Powhatan County line)
1.000 mi = 1.609 km; 1.000 km = 0.621 mi

== SR 149 ==
State Route 149
- Location: Morven-east
- Existed: 1930–1942

State Route 149 extended east along current SR 616 from former SR 38 (now SR 681) at Morven to SR 636 at Lodore, in the direction of former SR 148 (now SR 604) at Masons Corner. This road is now part of U.S. Bike Route 1.

1 mile (1.6 km) at the west end was added to the state highway system in 1930 as State Route 422, which was extended east to Lodore in 1932. It became SR 149 in the 1933 renumbering and was downgraded to secondary in 1942 as an extension of existing SR 635 (since combined with SR 616).

== SR 159 ==
State Route 159
- Location: Crozier-Oilville
- Existed: 1930–1945

State Route 159 followed current secondary SR 670 from SR 6 at Crozier north to US 250 at Oilville. 2.2 miles (3.5 km) at the north end were added to the state highway system in 1930 as State Route 427, which was extended to Crozier in 1932. The road became SR 159 in the 1933 renumbering and was downgraded to secondary in 1945.

Major intersections

The entire route is in Goochland County.

Location	mi	km	Destinations	Notes
Crozier	0.00	0.00	SR 6 (River Road West) – Richmond, Goochland CH	
Oilville	5.21	8.38	US 250 (Broad Street Road) – Charlottesville, Richmond	
1.000 mi = 1.609 km; 1.000 km = 0.621 mi

== SR 162 ==
State Route 162
- Location: Shannon Hill-southwest
- Existed: 1930–1943

State Route 162 extended southwest from just north of US 250 at SR 653 (Three Chopt Road, former SR 5) at Shannon Hill along current secondary SR 605 (now part of U.S. Bike Route 76) in the direction of Columbia, ending about 1 mile (1.6 km) beyond Tabscott. (If it continued along SR 605, it would meet SR 27 at Stage Junction.) The northernmost 1 mile (1.6 km) was added to the state highway system in 1930 as State Route 436, which was extended another 2.4 miles (3.9 km) in 1932. The road became SR 162 in the 1933 renumbering and was downgraded to secondary in 1943 as an extension of existing SR 605.

== SR 163 ==
State Route 163
- Location: US 60-Roxbury
- Existed: 1930–1942

State Route 163 extended south from US 60 to the Roxbury area along what is now SR 106 and SR 609. The south end was located about 1/4 mile (0.40 km) east of the center of Roxbury, where SR 106 and SR 609 intersect. The road became State Route 424 in 1930 and SR 163 in the 1933 renumbering, and was downgraded to secondary in 1942 as an extension of existing SR 602 (now SR 609). In 1987, most of the former SR 163 returned to the primary system as an extension of SR 106.

== SR 336 ==
State Route 336
- Location: Richmond Deepwater Terminal
- Existed: 1938–1942

State Route 336 extended along Commerce Road from the old Richmond city limits (at Joplin Avenue) south to the Richmond Deepwater Terminal. It was added to the primary state highway system in 1938 as a 4.2 miles (6.8 km) route, which would place the southern end at the modern city limits, where Commerce Road now ends. Richmond annexed the road and surrounding land at the beginning of 1942, which would normally result in maintenance going to the city, but the state legislature allowed the state to complete ongoing construction. The route stopped appearing on state maps by 1944, but in 1953 the city requested that the state four-lane the road (then known as Ninth Street Road), citing the 1942 law and the possibility of incorporating it into the proposed Richmond-Petersburg Turnpike (which was instead built just to the east).

The part of former SR 336 north of Bellemeade Road was part of SR 416, a "primary extension" eligible for special funding from the state to the city, from 1981 to 1988. In 1994 a short piece farther to the south became part of SR 161.
