= Richmond–Petersburg Turnpike =

Highway in Virginia

Richmond–Petersburg Turnpike

Route information
- Length: 35 mi (56 km)
- Existed: 1955–1992
- Component highways: I-85 from southern terminus to Downtown Petersburg; I-95 from Downtown Petersburg to northern terminus

Location
- Country: United States
- State: Virginia

Highway system
- Virginia Routes; Interstate; US; Primary; Secondary; Byways; History; HOT lanes

The Richmond–Petersburg Turnpike was a controlled-access toll road located in the Richmond-Petersburg region of central Virginia, United States.

After World War II, major traffic congestion occurred in the area around Richmond and Petersburg along U.S. Route 1 (US 1) and US 301. This was particularly true where these two major routes shared the same roadway for much of the distance between the two cities, as well as bridges across the James River and Appomattox River.

To help alleviate the problems, in 1955 the Virginia General Assembly created a political subdivision, the Richmond Petersburg Turnpike Authority. The authority was administered by a board of directors. Its members were appointed by the local governing bodies of the jurisdictions through which the turnpike passed, one member from each locality. It was given the mission to sell toll revenue bonds to build and operate a new toll highway parallel to the existing US 1 and US 301 between Henrico County just north of Richmond and Dinwiddie County just south of Petersburg, with new bridges over the two major rivers. Opened in 1958, and funded through toll revenue bonds, it was conceived prior to the creation of the Interstate Highway System.

Tolls were removed completely in 1992. Today, the former Richmond–Petersburg Turnpike forms 30 miles (48 km) of Interstate 95 (I-95) in central Virginia as well as the northernmost 5 miles (8.0 km) of I-85 in Petersburg and Dinwiddie County. The 4 miles (6.4 km) of I-64 which overlap I-95 in Richmond were also part of the turnpike.

== History ==
In 1826, a privately operated toll road known as the Manchester and Petersburg Turnpike opened that extended through Chesterfield County between Richmond and Petersburg. At some point it became known as the Richmond and Petersburg Turnpike. In 1922 much of that route was renamed Jefferson Davis Highway and in 1926 was also designated U.S. Routes 1 and 301. Some Chesterfield County and Colonial Heights land deeds still reference the name Richmond–Petersburg Turnpike for properties along Jefferson Davis Highway. Historical accounts of 1864 Civil War events mention that name as well.

=== Richmond-Petersburg Turnpike Authority ===
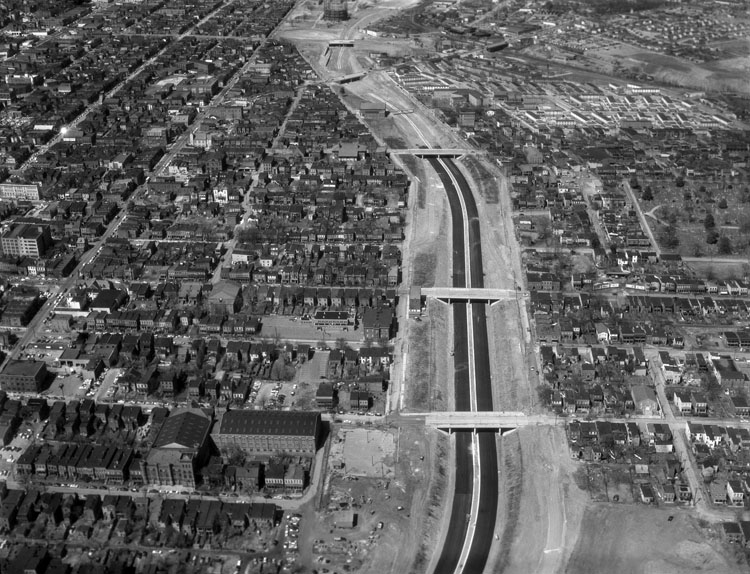
The Richmond-Petersburg turnpike under construction, as it passes through Jackson Ward.

After World War II, the busy north–south corridor in central Virginia shared by US 1, US 301 and the Jefferson Davis Memorial Highway through the cities of Richmond, Colonial Heights and Petersburg and along the Jefferson Davis Highway between the cities was heavily developed commercially. With only four traffic lanes and long stretches of undivided roadway, it became a major area of traffic congestion, as well as the site of occasional spectacular and deadly head-on collisions.

In 1955, prior to the creation of the U.S. Interstate Highway System, the Virginia General Assembly created the Richmond–Petersburg Turnpike Authority as an independent state agency to administer (design, finance, acquire right-of-way, construct, operate, collect tolls, and maintain) the new Turnpike of the same name. The new toll road was planned with only 15 exits, and most of these were well away from the highly developed commercial areas along parallel US 1 and US 301.

Funded with proceeds from toll revenue bonds sold by the authority, the 34.7-mile (55.8 km)-long road cost $76.7 million to build, including new bridges over the James River in Richmond and the Appomattox River between Colonial Heights and Petersburg. It featured six lanes from the northern entrance to just south of the new James River Bridge in Richmond, and four lanes from that point south. At Petersburg, the new Turnpike split into two branches, one leading to US 301 south towards Emporia and Weldon, North Carolina, and the other to US 1 south, which led to South Hill and Raleigh, North Carolina.

The new expressway opened on July 1, 1958, and in August, the State Highway Commission designated it as part of Interstate 95. A piece near Petersburg was designated Interstate 85, and the turnpike became a grandfathered part of the Interstate Highway System even though no federal aid was used to build it. The new roadway achieved the intended diversion of long-distance traffic. As earlier feared, hotels, motels, tourist homes and cabins, and restaurants along the bypassed highways suffered tremendous loss of business, and many failed. However, due to the relatively high rate of tolls on the Turnpike, the blow was softened by a continually increasing traffic flow and patronage of motorists wanting to avoid the tolls, who continued to use the old roads. This practice of avoiding roads and bridges with tolls is known as "shunpiking".

=== Jackson Ward ===
The construction of the Richmond–Petersburg Turnpike in the 1950s led to the destruction of many blocks of homes and businesses in Jackson Ward, Richmond's oldest historically African-American community. The highway bisected the neighborhood and has had irreparable effects on its fabric. As was common in mid-century planning practices, lower class or black neighborhoods were often targeted and destroyed, such as the Hayti community of Durham North Carolina. This highway, along with the construction of Richmond's Downtown Expressway, were large factors in the decline and subsequent decay in many urban areas of the city.

=== Expansion ===
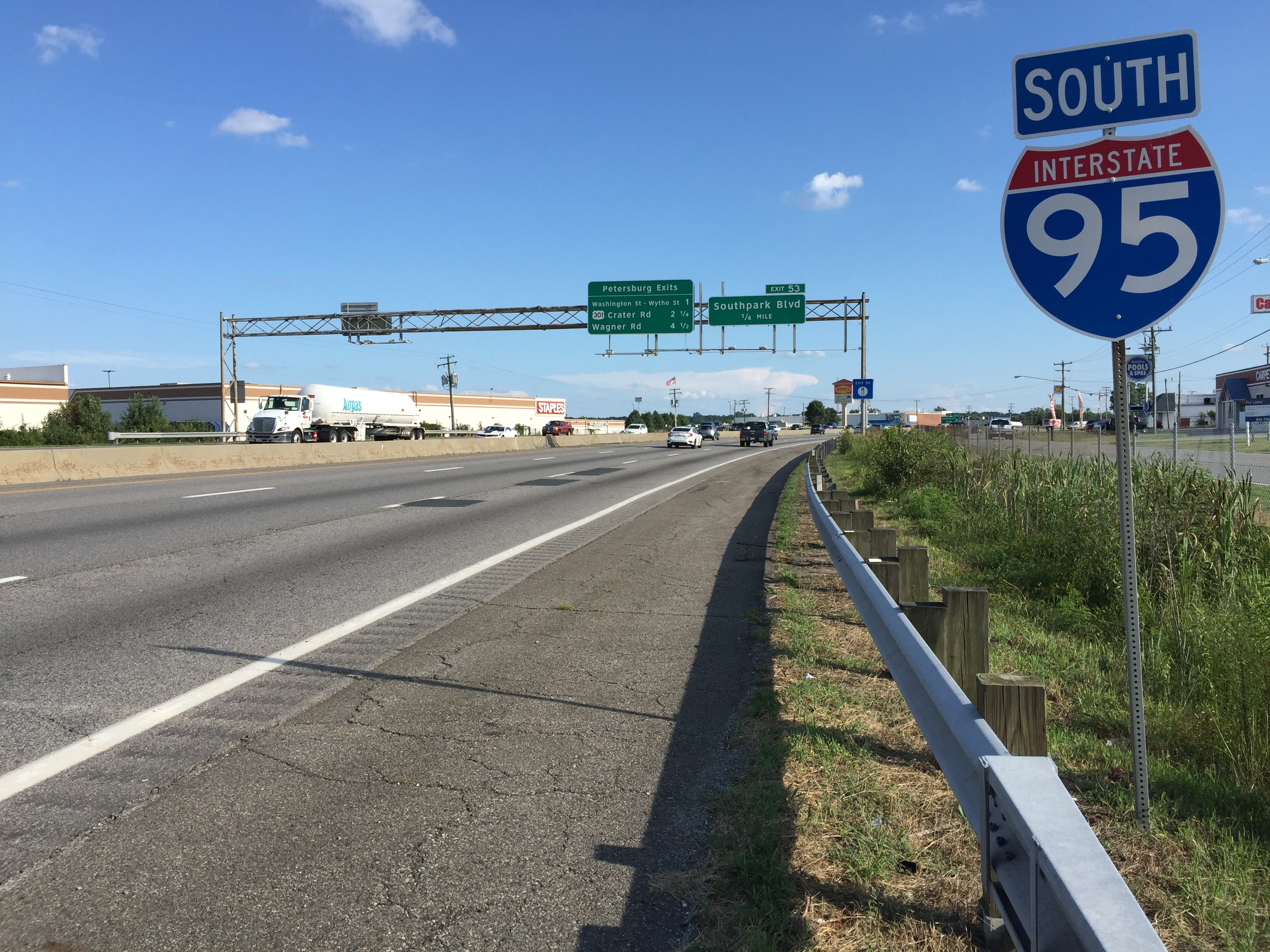
View south along the former Richmond-Petersburg Turnpike in Colonial Heights

The original toll revenue bonds were retired in 1975. However, in 1973, the General Assembly passed legislation which transferred the authority's duties to the Virginia Department of Highways, the predecessor agency to the Virginia Department of Transportation (VDOT). The authority as an independent entity ceased to exist and the Board of Directors disbanded. In December 1973, additional bonds were issued to provide much-needed improvements to the heavily traveled highway. Unlike the original toll revenue bonds which were backed only by toll revenue, the new bonds were backed by the Commonwealth of Virginia. They were still funded by toll revenue but the bondholders had more security with state backing and thus offered lower interest rates. A primary factor in turning the turnpike over to the Virginia Department of Highways was to obtain full state control since the state was taking the risk on the bonds.

The improvements included widening to six lanes of 22 miles (35 km) from just south of the James River Bridge at Richmond and complete reconstruction of the I-85 and I-95 interchange in downtown Petersburg. Several other major interchanges including Chester/Hopewell and Broad Street at downtown Richmond were also reconstructed.

Once the bonds were paid off, toll revenue funded safety improvements on the entire turnpike which included sign and guardrail replacements as well as replacing most of the median guardrail with Jersey style concrete median barriers. Toll money was also spent on nearby road projects such as the Temple Avenue extension (State Route 144). Since interstate travelers were paying most of the tolls that was then being spent on other projects, toll removal became a local political issue that the General Assembly eventually decided to approximately coincide with the opening of the parallel Interstate 295.

=== Tolls removed, modernization ===
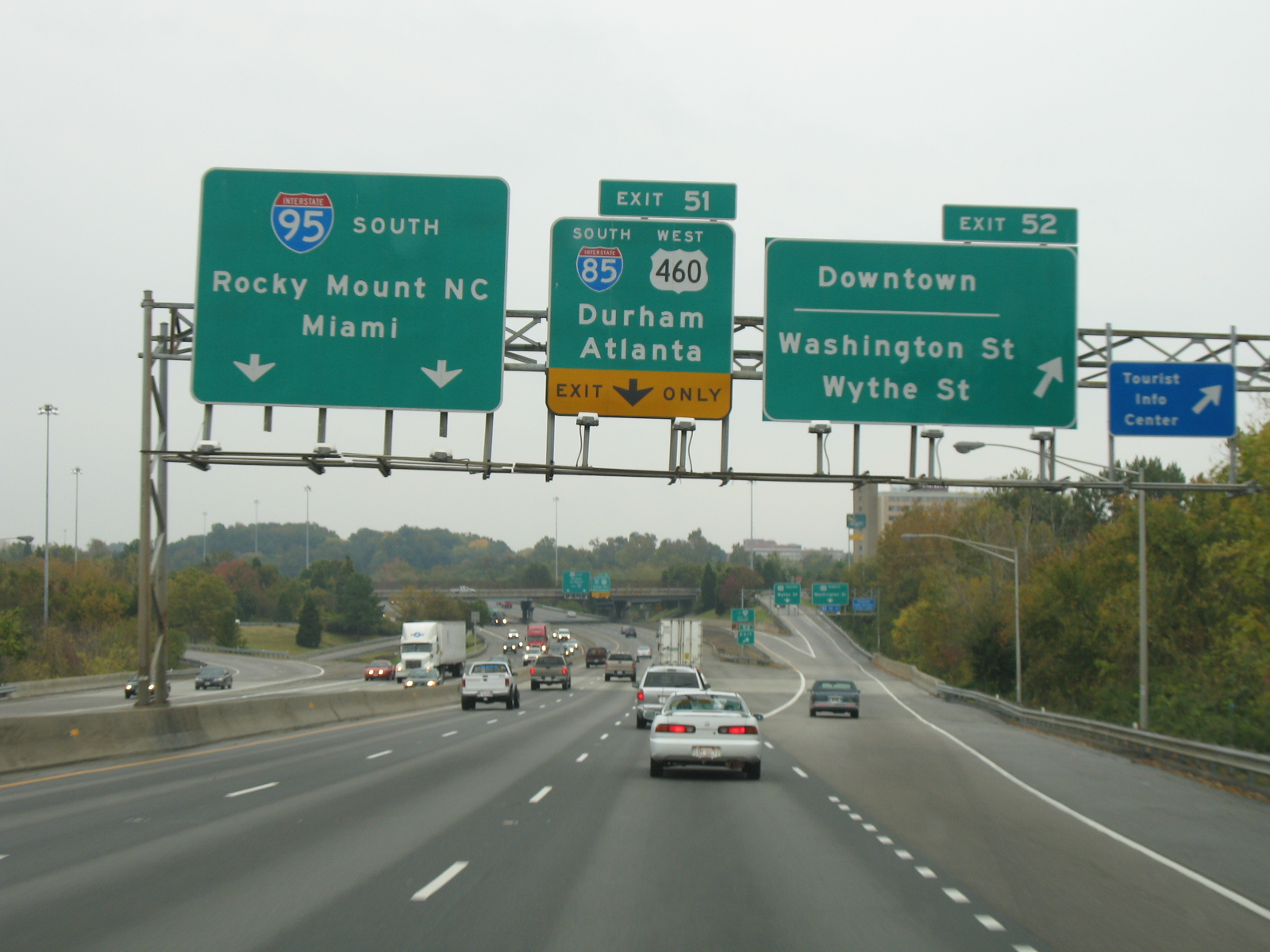
Signage on the southbound (former) Turnpike near Petersburg is aimed at long-distance travelers. The distant destinations of Miami (Florida) and Atlanta (Georgia) are signed.

Tolls were removed from all portions of the former Richmond–Petersburg Turnpike in 1992, although the road now connects with several newer locally oriented toll facilities, including Richmond Metropolitan Authority's Downtown Expressway (State Route 195) which interchanges with the former Turnpike on the I-95 James River Bridge, and the Pocahontas Parkway (State Route 895) which connects I-95 at exit 67 with Interstate 295 and the Richmond International Airport.

The original office building with the iconic "Richmond Petersburg Turnpike" lettering was located at exit 61A on southbound Interstate 95 and was used by VDOT until it was demolished in 2021 during improvements to the interchange.

Today, the former Richmond–Petersburg Turnpike with the I-95 designation, and parallel Interstate 295 (which forms an eastern bypass of Richmond and Petersburg) carry some of the heaviest traffic flows of any portion of the busy eastern U.S. corridor between Florida and New England.

== Exit list ==
County	Location	mi	km	Old exit	New exit	Destinations	Notes
Dinwiddie				1	63	US 1 (US 460 Bus.)	Signed as exits 63A and 63B
Dinwiddie				Former Dinwiddie County barrier toll			
City of Petersburg					65	Squirrel Level Road	
City of Petersburg				2	68	I-95 south / US 460 east – Rocky Mount, Norfolk I-85 ends	Northern end of I-85 concurrency; southern end of I-95 concurrency; northern end of US 460 concurrency; Turnpike takes exit 51 from I-95 south
City of Petersburg				3	69	Wythe Street / Washington Street (US 301 / US 460 Bus.) — Downtown	Exit 52 southbound
City of Petersburg					52	Bank Street	Northbound exit only
City of Colonial Heights					53	Southpark Boulevard	
City of Colonial Heights				4	54	SR 144 (Temple Avenue)	Former Colonial Heights barrier toll between the exit and entrance ramps
Chesterfield				5	58	SR 746 (Ruffin Mill Road) / SR 620 (Woods Edge Road)	Signed as exits 58A and 58B southbound; interchange was originally named Walthall
Chesterfield	Chester			6	61	SR 10 – Hopewell, Chester	Signed as exits 61A and 61B (old 6E and 6W; originally 6 with only one exit)
Chesterfield	Chester			6	62	SR 288 / Powhite Parkway – Chesterfield	
Chesterfield				6A	64	SR 613 (Willis Road)	
Chesterfield	Bensley				67A	SR 895 east	
Chesterfield	Bensley			7	67B	SR 150 north (Chippenham Parkway) to US 60 / US 360 west	Formerly exit 67; former Falling Creek barrier toll between the exit and entrance ramps
City of Richmond				8	69	SR 161 (Bells Road)	
City of Richmond				9	73	Maury Street; Commerce Road	
City of Richmond				9A	74A	SR 195 to I-195 north – Downtown Expressway to Powhite Parkway	
City of Richmond				10A	74B	Franklin Street	Southbound exit only
City of Richmond				10	74C	US 33 / US 250 (Broad Street)	
City of Richmond				11	75	I-64 east – Williamsburg, Norfolk, Virginia Beach; 7th Street	Southern end of I-64 concurrency
City of Richmond				12	76A	US 1 / US 301 (Chamberlayne Avenue)	Northbound exit and southbound entrance
City of Richmond				13	76B	US 1 / US 301 (Belvidere Street)	No northbound exit
City of Richmond				Former Belvidere barrier toll			
City of Richmond				14	78	Boulevard (SR 161)	
City of Richmond				15A	79	I-64 west / I-195 south / Powhite Parkway – Charlottesville	Northern end of I-64 concurrency
City of Richmond				15	80	SR 161 / Hermitage Road / Lakeside Avenue	Northbound exit and southbound entrance
Henrico	Brook Hill			16	81	US 1	Northbound exit and southbound entrance
Henrico				17	82	US 301 / SR 2 (Chamberlayne Avenue)	
1.000 mi = 1.609 km; 1.000 km = 0.621 mi: Concurrency terminus; Incomplete access
