= VA195 =

VA-195 or VA 195 may refer to:

- Strike Fighter Squadron 195, a unit of the United States Navy
- State Route 195 (Virginia), a road in the Commonwealth of Virginia
