= Smart Tag =

American toll collection system

Smart Tag is the former name of a transponder-based electronic toll collection system implemented by the Virginia Department of Transportation (VDOT). It was launched as Fastoll on April 15, 1996. Fastoll was rebranded as Smart Tag in 1998, and was placed under the umbrella of Smart Travel. In November 2007, the Smart Tag brand name was retired in favor of E-ZPass Virginia, several years after the Smart Tag system became a part of the E-ZPass network.

Originally, Smart Tag only operated at certain toll roads and crossings in Virginia. The system became interoperable with the E-ZPass toll collection system on October 27, 2004, although Richmond Metropolitan Authority owned toll roads—Boulevard Bridge, the Downtown Expressway, and the Powhite Parkway (excluding the extension)—did not begin accepting E-ZPass until August 3, 2005; E-ZPass integration had been delayed due to damages from Tropical Storm Gaston. Smart Tag branded transponders operate throughout the E-ZPass network, and E-ZPass branded transponders operate at all E-ZPass Virginia (formerly Smart Tag) toll collection points.

Roads and crossings that accept Smart Tag/E-ZPass Virginia/E-ZPass:

- Dulles Toll Road from Falls Church to Dulles International Airport (DC suburbs).
- Dulles Greenway, a privately owned highway from Dulles to Leesburg.
- Downtown Expressway in Richmond.
- Powhite Parkway and Powhite Parkway Extension in Richmond and Chesterfield County.
- Boulevard Bridge (the "Nickel Bridge", though it costs 45 cents now) in Richmond
- Pocahontas Parkway in Chesterfield and Henrico County.
- Chesapeake Expressway in Chesapeake.
- George P. Coleman Bridge, across the York River near Newport News (U.S. Highway 17).
- Chesapeake Bay Bridge-Tunnel
- Any road or crossing in the E-ZPass network.
