= VA147 =

VA-147 has a number of meanings:

- VFA-147 Argonauts (formerly VA-147), a US Navy attack aircraft squadron
- Virginia State Route 147
