= Jefferson, Virginia =

Jefferson, Virginia may refer to:

- Jefferson, Powhatan County, Virginia
- the former name for West Falls Church, Virginia
