= Morven =

Morven may refer to:

== Places ==
=== Australia ===
- Morven, New South Wales
- Morven Parish, New South Wales
- Morven, Queensland
  - Morven railway station
- Electoral district of Morven, Tasmania, 1856–1886

=== Canada ===
- Morven, Loyalist, Ontario

=== New Zealand ===
- Morven, Waimate District, Canterbury Region

=== Scotland ===
- Morven, Caithness, a mountain
- Morven, Aberdeenshire, a mountain
- Morrone, sometimes known as Morven, a mountain
- Morven, a historic spelling of Morvern, a traditional district and peninsula in the western Highlands

=== United States ===
==== Settlements ====
- Morven, Georgia
- Morven, Indiana
- Morven, North Carolina
- Morven Township, Anson County, North Carolina
- Morven, Virginia
- Morven Park, Leesburg, Virginia

==== Historic homes ====
- Morven (Princeton, New Jersey)
- Morven, Fairlington, Arlington, Virginia
- Morven (Cartersville, Virginia)
- Morven (Markham, Virginia)
- Morven (Simeon, Virginia)

== People ==
- Morven le Gaëlique, pseudonym of Max Jacob (1876–1944), French poet, author, and painter
- Morven Livingstone, Lady Heller (born 1940), British philanthropist and wife of Sir Michael Heller
- Morven Christie (born 1981), Scottish actress

== See also ==
- Duchess of Morven, nickname of Annis Boudinot Stockton (1736–1801), American poet
- Maclean baronets, of Morvaren (or Morvern) in the County of Argyll, Scotland
