= Powhite Parkway Bridge =

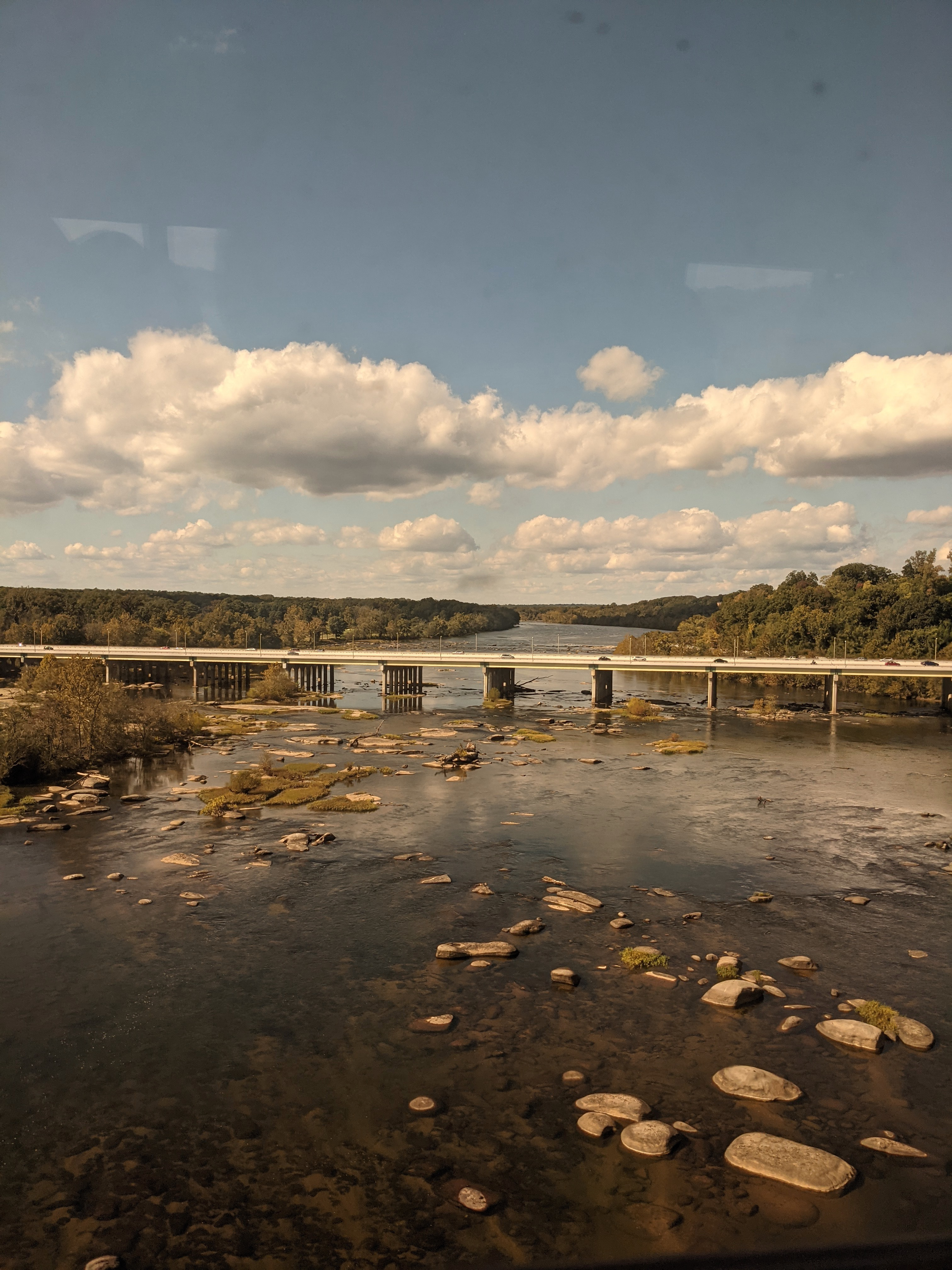
- Powhite Parkway Bridge viewed from a distance, in 2021.
- Coordinates: 37°32′21″N 77°29′46″W
- Carries: Powhite Parkway
- Crosses: James River
- Locale: Richmond, Virginia
- Owner: Richmond Metropolitan Authority

Statistics
- Toll: None

Location
- Interactive map of Powhite Parkway Bridge

Powhite Parkway Bridge crosses the James River in the independent city of Richmond, Virginia. It carries the Powhite Parkway, also known as Virginia State Route 76. The bridge is owned and maintained by the Richmond Metropolitan Authority, and was funded with revenue bonds which are repaid from user tolls. There is no bridge toll to cross the Powhite Parkway Bridge, however the toll plazas located south of the bridge prohibit drivers from crossing the bridge without paying a Powhite Parkway toll.
