= Old Town Manchester =

Neighborhood of Richmond, Virginia

Coordinates: 37°31′21″N 77°25′50″W

Old Town Manchester is a neighborhood in Richmond, Virginia's Southside quadrant. The neighborhood is where downtown Manchester, Richmond, Virginia, United States, was situated before the city merged with Richmond in 1910. The area is heavily industrialized, but has gone through a period of gentrification. Several lofts and art galleries have opened in the area.

== See also ==
- Manchester, Richmond, Virginia
- Neighborhoods of Richmond, Virginia
- Southside (Richmond, Virginia)
