= Morven, Virginia =

Unincorporated community in Virginia, United States

- Unincorporated community
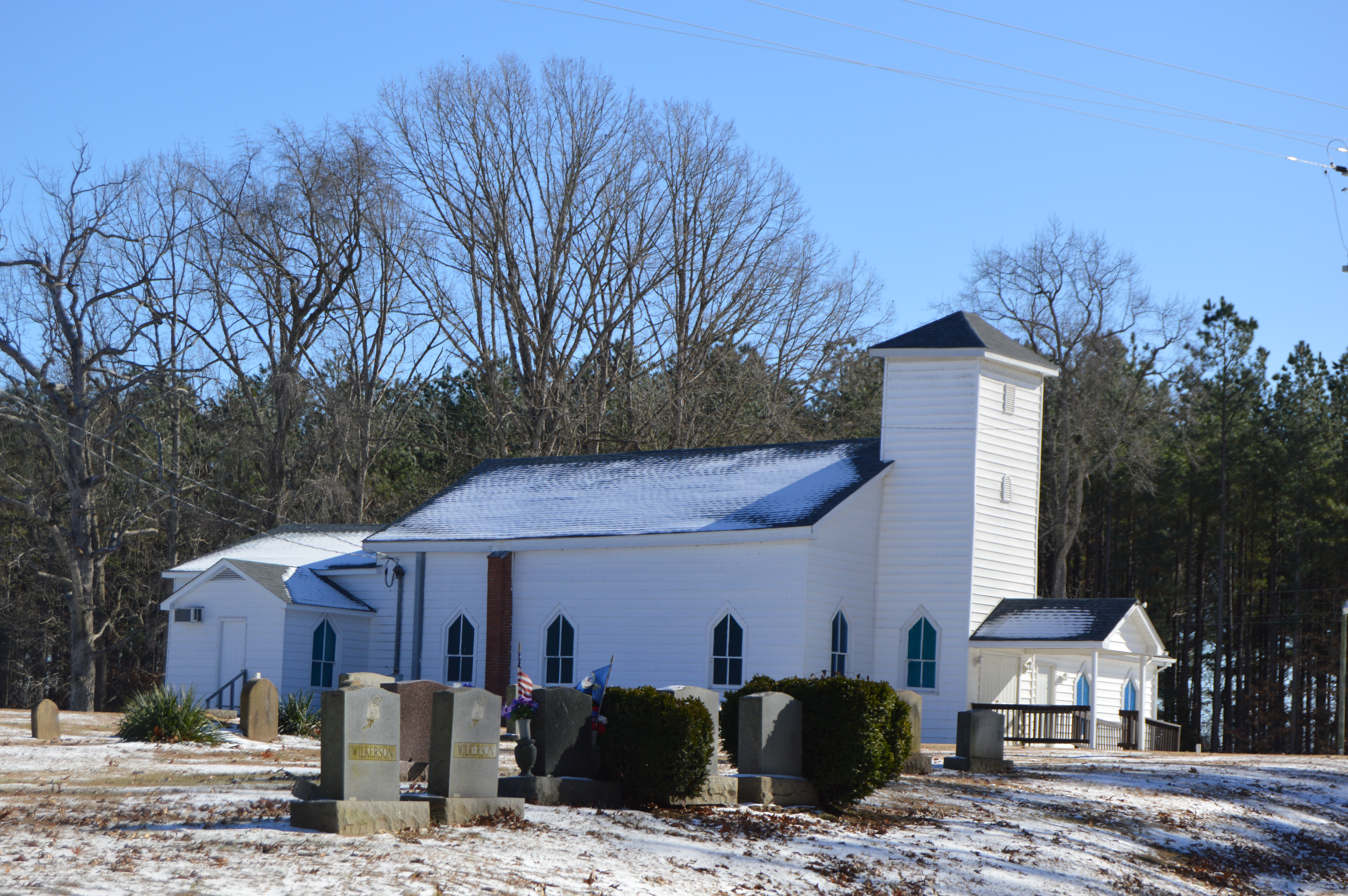
- Little Union Baptist Church, Morven

- Location within the Commonwealth of Virginia Morven, Virginia (the United States)
- Coordinates: 37°25′06″N 78°04′33″W
- Country: United States
- State: Virginia
- County: Amelia
- Elevation: 403 ft (123 m)
- Time zone: UTC−5 (Eastern (EST))
  - Summer (DST): UTC−4 (EDT)
- ZIP code: 23002
- Area code: 804
- FIPS code: 51-53320
- GNIS feature ID: 1477555

Morven is a rural unincorporated community in northwestern Amelia County just south of the Appomattox River in the U.S. state of Virginia. It is located in Leigh District at the intersection of SR 681 (Clementown Road) and SR 616 (S. Genito Road), northwest of Flat Creek. The name sometimes appears as "Moryen", probably a misspelling. A portion of the segment of U.S. Bicycle Route 1 that runs southwest from Richmond follows SR 616 through Morven.

== History ==
=== Name and origins ===
The precise origin of the name is uncertain, although it likely was borrowed from one or more of several features in Scotland, as "Morven" has a lengthy and varied history of use as a place-name in other areas settled by Scots, especially in Virginia. The name was given to a large Amelia County estate just north of the crossroads before it was used for the town itself. The hamlet, originally noted as Eanes (or Eenes) Crossroads, was a post village by the mid-1800s; by 1855, its post office was listed as Morven. The name was well-established at the turn of the 20th century, and the Morven post office appeared in gazetteers at least as late as the 1920s – although apparently it had closed before then, one of the thousands of small "fourth class" facilities that were shut down in the early 1900s after the advent of rural free delivery. The area is now served by the post office 10 miles southeast at the county seat, Amelia Court House, ZIP code 23002.

=== Civil War ===
On April 5, 1865, during the final days of the Civil War, as General Robert E. Lee and his exhausted, hungry, and depleted Army of Northern Virginia continued their westward retreat, Union cavalry intercepted and destroyed a Confederate wagon train that had just traveled through Morven. The wagons, carrying desperately needed supplies sent from Richmond for the Rebels, had been delayed because wet weather had rendered the Appomattox uncrossable at the Genito bridge, forcing the caravan to take a longer route to the north and cross the river at Clement Town. The engagement was one of the few, if not the only one, to involve Black Confederate troops. The surrender to Ulysses S. Grant took place at Appomattox Court House on April 9.

=== Former highway designations ===
During the first part of the 20th century, a segment of SR 38 (earlier SR 49) extended from Amelia Court House to Tobaccoville via Morven; this section of Highway 38 was downgraded to SR 681 in 1954 (see Virginia State Route 38: History). Former Virginia primary highway 149 ran from Morven to Masons Corner; it too was reduced to secondary status, in 1942.

=== Morven School ===
Morven School was built as a one-room public schoolhouse circa 1915. Located on Route 616, with two acres of land, it was among several public school properties in Amelia County put up for auction in the late 1960s. Although all the properties advertised were of similar description and most are documented to have been Rosenwald Schools, it is unclear whether Morven School was itself a Rosenwald. During the early 20th century, the Rosenwald project was a collaborative effort that constructed thousands of facilities across the South primarily to improve the education of African American children. After desegregation, the Rosenwald model became obsolete, and many former Rosenwald properties were demolished or sold.

=== Historic structures ===
Existing historic structures around Morven include:

- Shrum House, 2/3 mile south on Route 681, built just after the American Revolution and restored around the late 1960s.
- Union Baptist Church & Cemetery, established 1833 and a prominent local landmark by the time of the Civil War, on modern-day Route 616 halfway between Morven and Paineville.
- Little Union Baptist Church (pictured), established 1874, on Route 681 just north of the crossroads.
- Haw Branch plantation, 4 miles east of Morven, added to the National Register of Historic Places in 1973.
