= Smoky Ordinary, Virginia =

Unincorporated area in Virginia, US

Coordinates: 36.8287594°N 77.7380468°W

Smoky Ordinary is an unincorporated area in Brunswick County, Virginia, United States.

== History ==
The ordinary that stood on this site catered to travelers on the north–south stage road as early as 1750. During the American Revolution, local warehouses were burned by British Colonel Tarleton, and legend says that it was from that occurrence that the ordinary derived its name.

During the Civil War, the post office (1832–1964) and inn were spared when a Union officer recognized the inn's owner, Dr. George M. Raney, as being a former classmate at the University of Pennsylvania.

"Ordinary" is sometimes used to refer to a tavern or a place where food is sold to the public. The name of this location was sometimes spelled as "Smokey Ordinary". A post office called Smokey Ordinary was established in 1832, and remained in operation until 1964. The town's first name was "Ordinary", but after it burned during the Revolutionary War, the name was prefixed with "Smok(e)y".
