= Virginia State Route 288 =

State highway in Virginia, United States

State Route 288
- World War II Veterans Memorial Highway

Route information
- Maintained by VDOT
- Length: 31.77 mi (51.13 km)

Major junctions
- South end: I-95 near Chester
- US 1 / US 301 near Chester; US 360 near Brandermill; US 60 near Midlothian; US 250 near Short Pump
- North end: I-64 near Short Pump

Location
- Country: United States
- State: Virginia
- Counties: Chesterfield, Powhatan, Goochland

Highway system
- Virginia Routes; Interstate; US; Primary; Secondary; Byways; History; HOT lanes
← SR 287	→ SR 289

State Route 288 is a primary state highway in the U.S. state of Virginia. It is a freeway-standard partial beltway around the southwest side of the Richmond, Virginia metropolitan area in portions of Goochland, Powhatan, and Chesterfield counties. SR 288 was officially dedicated as the World War II Veterans Memorial Highway in 2004.

== Route description ==
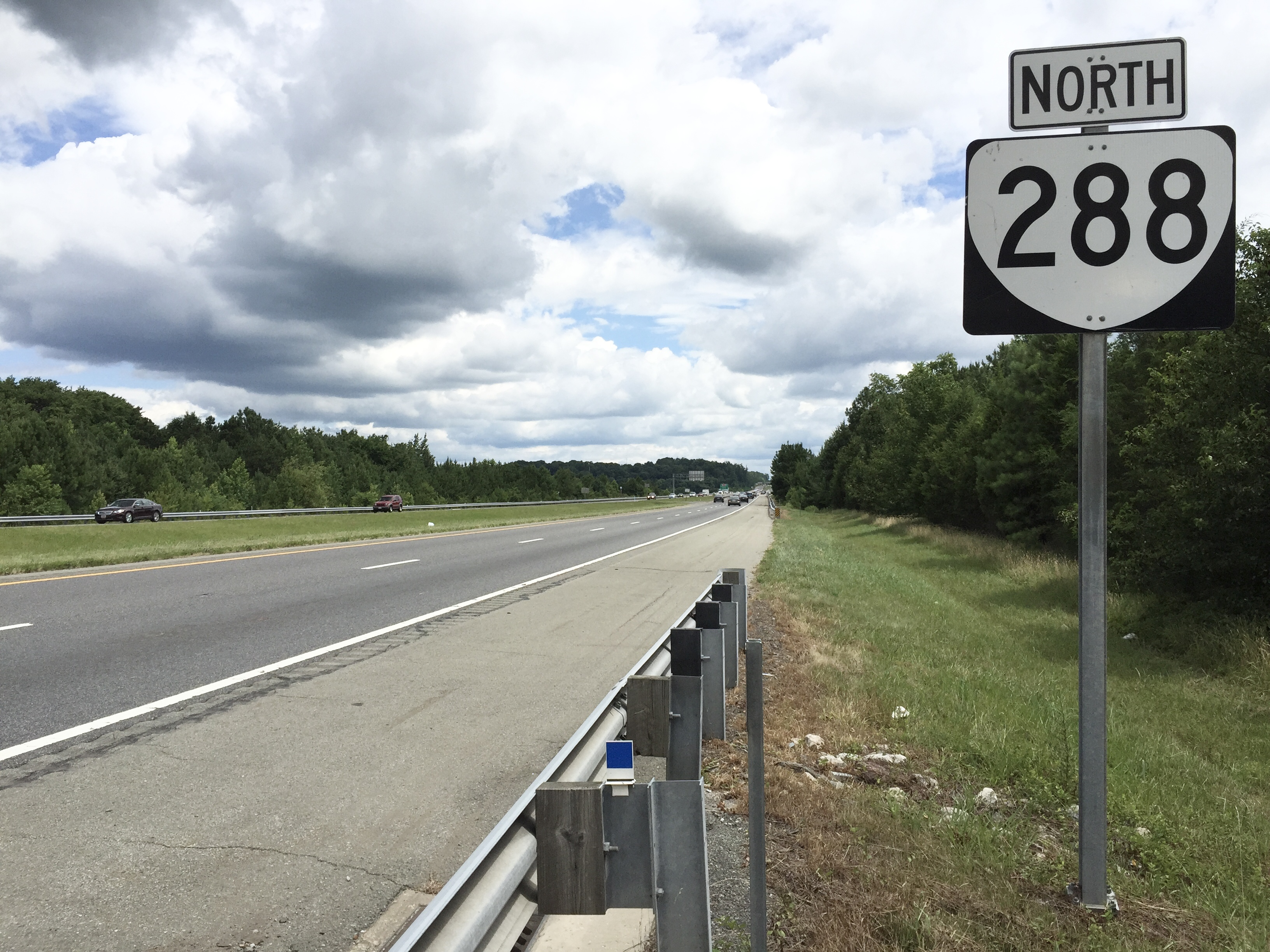
View north along SR 288 north of SR 711 in Powhatan County

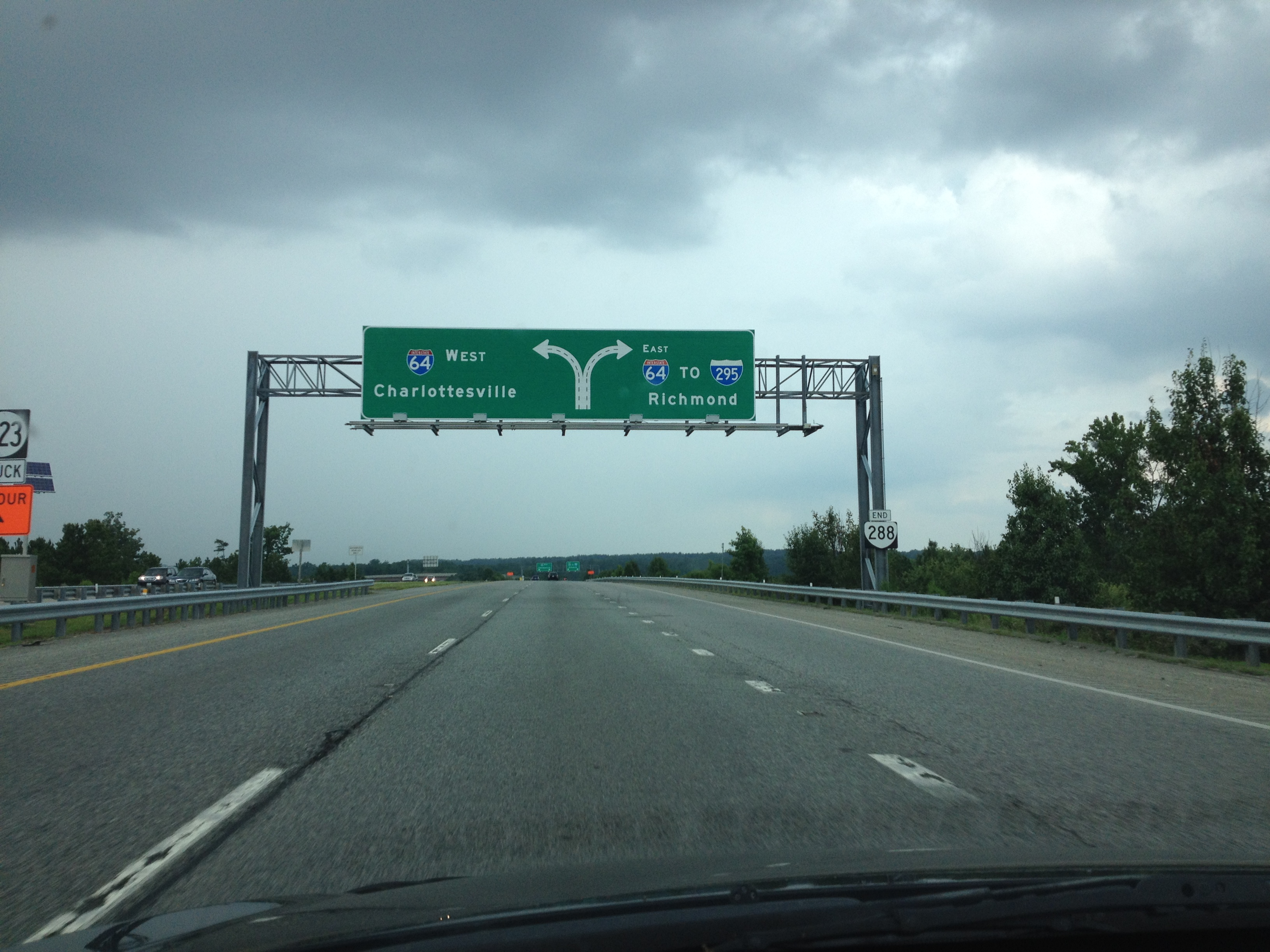
The northern terminus of SR 288 at I-64 near Short Pump

SR 288 may be thought of as the southwestern portion of an "outer beltway" of Richmond, although there is no such roadway formally designated. The route begins at Interstate 95 north of Chester, and extends northwesterly through Chesterfield County and Powhatan County. It crosses the James River on the World War II Veterans Memorial Bridge into Goochland County in Richmond's Far West End area, where it terminates at Interstate 64 near Short Pump, near the northern terminus of Interstate 295.

The highway has been built entirely to Interstate standards.

== History ==
In 1968, Congress passed the Federal-Aid Highway Act of 1968, which expanded the Interstate Highway System by 1,500 miles (2,400 km). The Commonwealth Transportation Board (CTB) resolved in its August 1968 meeting to apply to the American Association of State Highway and Transportation Officials (AASHTO) for approval of five new stretches of Interstate. Three of these – the future I-195 and I-664 plus an expansion of the Berkley Bridge on I-264 – were submitted and approved. The other two presumably received no further action because they are not in AASHTO's records; these are today SR 288 and SR 164.

Sections of the road were built over a period of more than 15 years. During that time, the planned routing of the northern portion was changed substantially, and not without some conflict within the communities. The 17.4-mile-long southern portion of SR 288 in Chesterfield County (from Interstate 95 to State Route 76 near Midlothian) was completed in 1989.

Initially, the highway was planned to continue north and west of this temporary terminus to connect with Interstate 64 at Interstate 295, creating a seamless straight connection between SR 288 and I-295. This would have formed a partial beltway (I-295 north of I-64 and east of I-95, and SR 288 in the southwest quadrant).

However, this planned corridor and a river crossing into Henrico County west of Richmond was abandoned in 1988. This was due to a peculiarity in the varying powers and abilities of local governments to control growth and preserve rights-of-way resultant from the Byrd Road Act of 1932. While Henrico County had been able to preserve its corridor, there had been development of residential neighborhoods and homes along and within the intended path in Chesterfield County during the years after initial planning. Despite opposition by both Henrico County and the City of Richmond, a more westerly alignment north of SR 76 was selected. Much of the planned section in Henrico County became the John Rolfe Parkway corridor there.

Instead, a more westerly alignment was selected through Powhatan and Goochland Counties, causing a break in what would have been a continuous loop between SR 288 and I-295 at their northern juncture. In 2004, construction of this "western alignment" as it became known was completed, including a new crossing of the James River known as the World War II Veterans Memorial Bridge.

Henrico County was able to preserve its planned corridor for Route 288 from development while Chesterfield County was not. This was partially because Henrico and Arlington County are the only two counties in Virginia which control and maintain their own secondary highways and streets. VDOT handles this for Chesterfield and all other counties, but has little control of residential development.

== Exit list ==
All exits are unnumbered.

County	Location	mi	km	Destinations	Notes
Chesterfield		0.00	0.00	I-95 – Richmond, Petersburg	Southern terminus; exit 62 (I-95); trumpet interchange
Chesterfield		0.48	0.77	US 1 / US 301 (Jefferson Davis Highway)	Cloverleaf interchange
Chesterfield	Centralia	2.01	3.23	SR 145 (Chester Road) – Chester	Diamond interchange
Chesterfield		5.89	9.48	SR 10 (Iron Bridge Road) – Chesterfield, Richmond	Cloverleaf interchange
Chesterfield	Five Forks	8.84	14.23	SR 604 (Courthouse Road)	Diamond interchange Former VA 106
Chesterfield				SR 2055 (Commonwealth Centre Parkway)	no northbound exit
Chesterfield		12.93	20.81	US 360 (Hull Street Road) – Amelia, Richmond	Cloverleaf interchange
Chesterfield		15.72	25.30	SR 76 (Powhite Parkway) / Old Hundred Road (SR 652) – Richmond	Cloverleaf interchange with collector-distributor lanes
Chesterfield				SR 720 (Lucks Lane)	Diamond interchange
Chesterfield		18.47	29.72	SR 668 (Woolridge Road)	Diamond interchange
Chesterfield				SR 667 (Otterdale Road) / Watkins Centre Parkway	Southbound access only
Chesterfield		20.24	32.57	US 60 (Midlothian Turnpike) – Powhatan, Midlothian	Cloverleaf interchange with collector-distributor lanes
Chesterfield				Watkins Centre Parkway (SR 7225)	Southbound access only
Powhatan		23.70	38.14	SR 711 (Huguenot Trail / Robious Road)	Diamond interchange; former SR 44
James River		25.24	40.62	World War II Veterans Memorial Bridge	
Goochland		26.81	43.15	SR 6 (Patterson Avenue) – Goochland, Richmond	Cloverleaf interchange; no direct access from SR 288 south to SR 6 west
Goochland		27.45	44.18	SR 1250 (West Creek Parkway) to SR 6 west	Partial cloverleaf interchange
Goochland		29.13	46.88	SR 740 (Tuckahoe Creek Parkway) / Capital One Drive	Cloverleaf interchange; flyover ramps from southbound SR 288 to Capital One Drive and from Capital One Drive to northbound SR 288
Goochland		30.92	49.76	US 250 (Broad Street)	interchange
Goochland		31.77	51.13	I-64 to I-295 – Charlottesville, Richmond	Northern terminus; exit 175 (I-64); semi-directional T interchange
1.000 mi = 1.609 km; 1.000 km = 0.621 mi: Incomplete access

== See also ==
- Transportation in Richmond, Virginia
- Interstate 295
- State Route 150
- State Route 895
