= Stage Junction, Virginia =

Unincorporated community in Virginia, United States

Coordinates: 37°47′28″N 78°09′12″W

Stage Junction is an unincorporated community in Fluvanna County, Virginia, United States.
