= Edgerton, Virginia =

Unincorporated community in Virginia, United States

Coordinates: 36°46′45″N 77°46′39″W

Edgerton is an unincorporated community located in Brunswick County, in the U.S. state of Virginia.
