= Virginia State Route 147 =

State highway in Virginia, US

State Route 147

Route information
- Maintained by VDOT
- Length: 13.13 mi (21.13 km)
- Existed: 1933–present

Major junctions
- West end: US 60 / SR 653 in Midlothian
- SR 150 in Richmond; SR 197 in Richmond; I-195 / SR 76 / SR 195 in Richmond; SR 161 in Richmond; US 1 / US 301 in Richmond
- East end: US 60 / US 360 in Richmond

Location
- Country: United States
- State: Virginia
- Counties: Chesterfield, Henrico, City of Richmond

Highway system
- Virginia Routes; Interstate; US; Primary; Secondary; Byways; History; HOT lanes
← SR 146	→ SR 148

State Route 147 (SR 147) is a primary state highway in the U.S. state of Virginia. The state highway runs 13.13 miles (21.13 km) from U.S. Route 60 (US 60) in Midlothian east to US 60 in Richmond. In various places, it is known as Huguenot Road, River Road, Cary Street Road and Main Street. SR 147 connects Midlothian with the West End of Richmond via the Huguenot Memorial Bridge across the James River. Within Richmond, the state highway follows Cary Street, a major thoroughfare that connects the city's two major universities, the University of Richmond and Virginia Commonwealth University, with Downtown Richmond.

== Route description ==
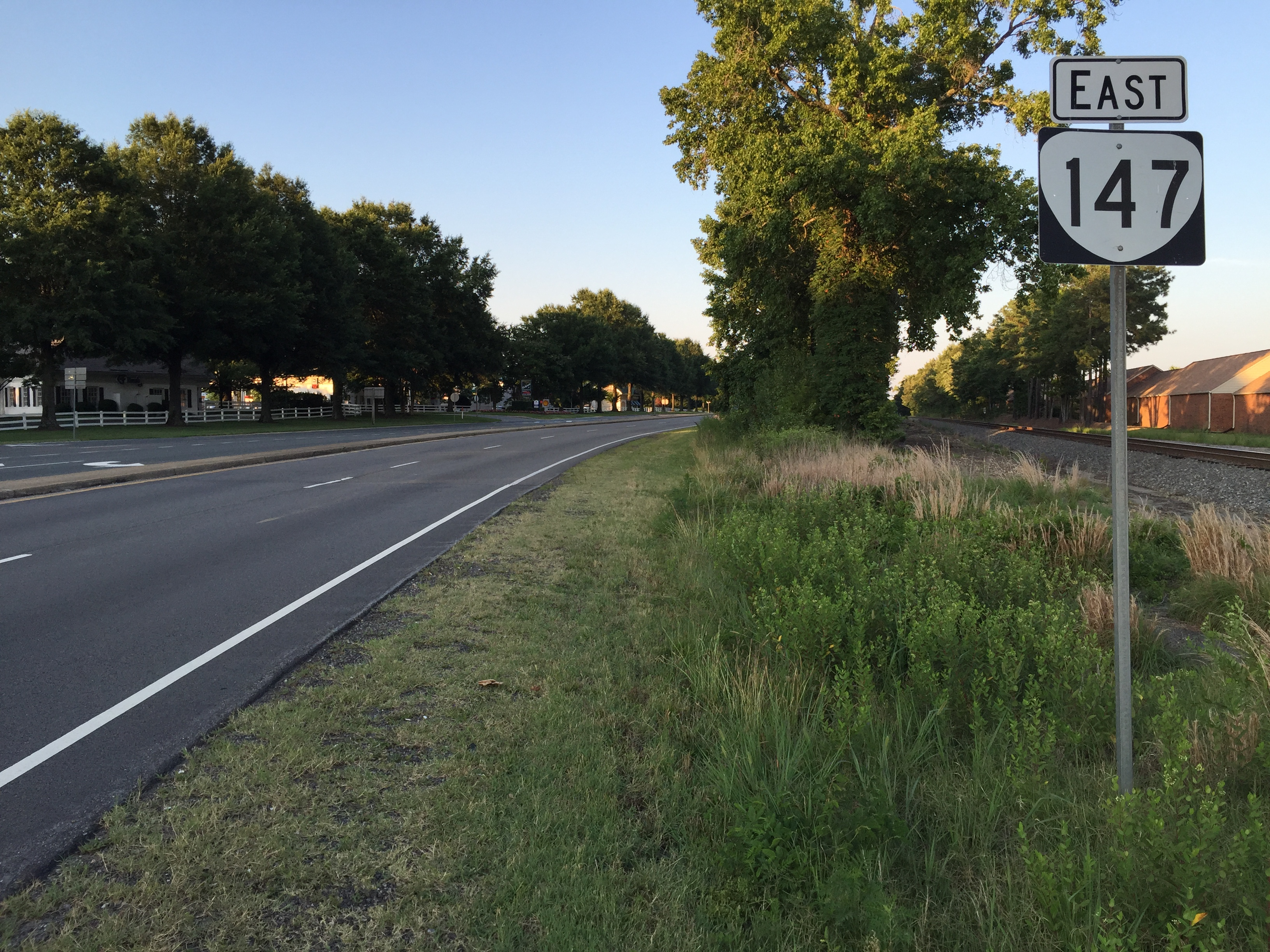
View east along SR 147 at Robious Road in Bon Air

SR 147 begins at an intersection with US 60 (Midlothian Turnpike) in Midlothian. The south leg of the intersection is SR 653 (Courthouse Road), which heads south toward Chesterfield Court House. SR 147 heads north as Huguenot Road, a four-lane divided highway that heads north through the expansive commercial area that surrounds the SR 147–US 60 intersection. The state highway veers northeast and intersects SR 711 (Robious Road) at the hamlet of Robious. The intersection also includes Norfolk Southern Railway's Richmond District rail line, which passes through the center of the junction at-grade. SR 147 parallels the railroad east, then veers northeast through the Bon Air sections of Chesterfield County. The state highway enters the independent city of Richmond just south of its partial cloverleaf interchange with SR 150 (Chippenham Parkway).

SR 147 passes through the Southampton neighborhood of Richmond's Southside before meeting Riverside Dr at a partial cloverleaf interchange at the south end of the Huguenot Memorial Bridge, where the highway reduces to a two-lane undivided road. The bridge crosses the James River, CSX's Rivanna Subdivision, and the defunct James River and Kanawha Canal east of the remnants of the Westham Bridge, SR 147's original crossing of the river. The state highway enters Henrico County at the south shore of the James River. At the north end of the bridge, SR 147 expands to a four-lane divided highway that curves east and intersects River Road just west of the Richmond city limit. River Road provides access to the University of Richmond, including the University of Richmond School of Law and the university's athletic complex, which includes Malcolm U. Pitt Field, the Robins Center, and E. Claiborne Robins Stadium.

SR 147 continues east as two-lane undivided River Road through Richmond's West End. The state highway becomes Cary Street at its intersection with Three Chopt Road in the center of the Rio Vista neighborhood, whose riverfront contains the Wilton House Museum. SR 147 continues southeast through the affluent Windsor Farms neighborhood, which contains the historic, imported homes Agecroft Hall and Virginia House. West of its junction with the western end of SR 197 (Malvern Avenue), the state highway expands to four lanes, which it maintains east to its freeway interchange and crossing of CSX's North End Subdivision just west of Thompson Street. The interchange includes ramps to and from southbound SR 76 (Powhite Parkway), eastbound SR 195 (Downtown Expressway), and via Thompson Street, northbound Interstate 195 (I-195) (Beltline Expressway).

At Thompson Street, SR 147 becomes a one-way pair, with eastbound following Cary Street and westbound following Ellwood Avenue through the Carytown neighborhood, which features the historic Byrd Theatre, the site of the annual VCU French Film Festival. The westbound street's name changes to Main Street east of the street's intersection with SR 161 (Boulevard). As SR 147 passes through the Fan district, Cary Street is paralleled one block to the south by SR 195. The state highway veers east to pass through the campus of Virginia Commonwealth University, then veers southeast into downtown Richmond at its intersections with US 1 and US 301 (Belvidere Street) on the south side of Monroe Park. SR 147 passes through the Commonwealth Club Historic District and by the historic Jefferson Hotel, the Ellen Glasgow House, and the Barret House before reaching its eastern terminus at US 60 two blocks west of the Virginia State Capitol. US 60 enters downtown from the Manchester Bridge on 8th and 9th Streets and turns southeast onto Cary Street and Main Street to pass through Shockoe Slip.

== Major intersections ==
County	Location	mi	km	Destinations	Notes
Chesterfield	Midlothian	0.00	0.00	US 60 (Midlothian Turnpike) / SR 653 (Courthouse Road) – Richmond, Midlothian, Lexington	Western terminus
Chesterfield	Robious			SR 675 / SR 711 (Robious Road)	former SR 44 west
City of Richmond		5.10	8.21	SR 150 (Chippenham Parkway) / to Stony Point Parkway / to Parham Road / to Powhite Parkway	interchange
City of Richmond				Riverside Drive	interchange
James River		6.34	10.20	Huguenot Memorial Bridge	
Henrico				River Road - University of Richmond	
City of Richmond				Three Chopt Road	former SR 197 north
City of Richmond				SR 197 east (Malvern Avenue)	
City of Richmond		9.96	16.03	I-195 to I-64 east / I-95 south / SR 150 (via SR 76 west)	interchange
City of Richmond		10.73	17.27	SR 161 (South Boulevard)	
City of Richmond		12.32	19.83	US 1 / US 301 (South Belvidere Street)	
City of Richmond		13.07	21.03	US 60 west (South 8th Street)	
City of Richmond		13.13	21.13	US 60 east (East Cary Street)	Eastern terminus
1.000 mi = 1.609 km; 1.000 km = 0.621 mi

< SR 417	District 4 State Routes; 1928–1933	SR 419 >
