= Jefferson, Powhatan County, Virginia =

Unincorporated community in Virginia, US

Coordinates: 37°36′49″N 77°54′17″W

Jefferson, Powhatan County is an unincorporated community in Powhatan County, in the U.S. state of Virginia. The ZIP Code used is 23139.
