= Virginia State Route 76 =

State highway in central Virginia, US

State Route 76
- Powhite Parkway

Route information
- Maintained by VDOT and Richmond Metropolitan Authority
- Length: 13.04 mi (20.99 km)
- Existed: 1973–present

Major junctions
- South end: SR 652 near Midlothian
- SR 288 near Midlothian; US 60 in Midlothian; SR 150 near Midlothian; SR 195 Toll in Richmond
- North end: I-195 in Richmond

Location
- Country: United States
- State: Virginia
- Counties: Chesterfield, City of Richmond

Highway system
- Virginia Routes; Interstate; US; Primary; Secondary; Byways; History; HOT lanes
← SR 75	→ I-77

State Route 76 (SR 76) is a controlled-access toll road in the U.S. state of Virginia. Known as the Powhite Parkway (first word officially pronounced /ˈpaʊ.haɪt/, similar to Powhatan), the state highway runs 13.04 miles (20.99 km) from SR 652 near Midlothian north to Interstate 195 (I-195) in Richmond. SR 76 connects SR 288, U.S. Route 60 (US 60), and SR 150 in Chesterfield County with I-195 and SR 195 west of Downtown Richmond. The highway includes a pair of mainline barrier toll plazas and ramp toll plazas at most interchanges, all of which accept E-ZPass. SR 76 is maintained by the Virginia Department of Transportation (VDOT) in Chesterfield County and the Richmond Metropolitan Authority in the city of Richmond. The Richmond section of the freeway was constructed in the early 1970s; the highway was extended to its current terminus in Chesterfield County in the late 1980s.

== Route description ==
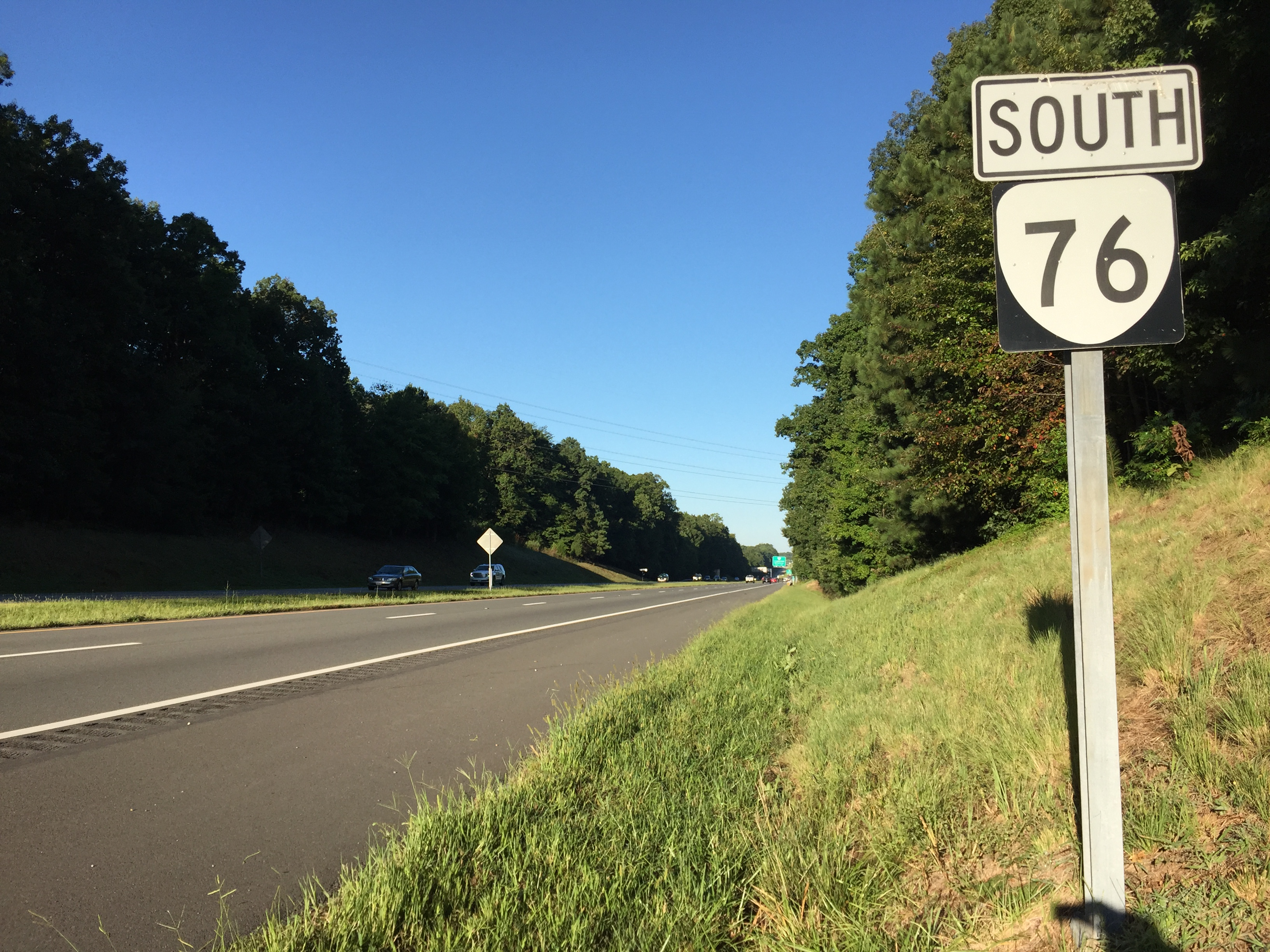
View south along SR 76 at Courthouse Road in Chesterfield County

SR 76 begins at an arbitrary point just east of an intersection with Brandermill Parkway, the main street through the Brandermill planned community. The road continues west as SR 652 (Old Hundred Road) toward Roseland. SR 76 heads east as a divided highway with three lanes northbound and two lanes southbound. The state highway becomes a freeway at its intersection with SR 754 (Charter Colony Parkway). East of SR 754, the highway carries two lanes in each direction. SR 76 has a cloverleaf interchange with the SR 288 freeway, east of which the highway becomes a toll road and crosses Falling Creek. The state highway has its first toll plaza just west of its diamond interchange with SR 653 (Courthouse Road). The northbound exit ramp and southbound entrance ramp for SR 653 diverge from the highway just west of the toll plaza and pass through the barrier separately before intersecting the crossing highway. The southbound exit ramp and northbound entrance ramp each have a ramp toll plaza before rejoining SR 76.

SR 76 veers northeast and meets US 60 (Midlothian Turnpike) at a cloverleaf interchange with collector-distributor lanes. The southbound entrance ramp has a right-in/right-out interchange with SR 953 (Arboretum Parkway), which serves a business park. The collector-distributor lanes each have a ramp toll plaza at their northern ends, where the toll freeway begins to follow Powhite Creek and passes by its impoundment, Rock Creek Park Lake. SR 76 has partial cloverleaf interchanges with SR 686 (Jahnke Road) and SR 150 (Chippenham Parkway) next to Powhite Park. The interchange with SR 150, which is on the boundary between Chesterfield County and the independent city of Richmond, includes a flyover ramp from southbound SR 76 to southbound SR 150 and does not have ramps from northbound SR 76 to southbound SR 150 and from northbound SR 150 to southbound SR 76. The missing movements are provided via SR 686. North of SR 150 are staggered toll plazas for each direction, each with three Express E-ZPass lanes in addition to standard toll plaza lanes. East of the toll plazas SR 76 passes under Norfolk Southern Railway's Richmond District and has a partial interchange with Forest Hill Avenue; this interchange has ramp toll plazas and provides access to and from the north.

SR 76 heads north from Forest Hill Avenue as a ten-lane road that crosses the James River and CSX's Rivanna Subdivision on the Powhite Parkway Bridge just south of the mouth of Powhite Creek. Two lanes from each direction split northeast onto SR 146, which serves as extended ramps from northbound SR 76 to and to southbound SR 76 from SR 195 (Downtown Expressway), an east–west toll road that connects SR 76 and I-95 in Downtown Richmond. Within that partial interchange, the northbound roadway passes under CSX's North End Subdivision tracks, which begin to run in the median of the freeway. North of SR 146, SR 76 has a partial cloverleaf interchange with Douglasdale Road and McCloy Street that lacks a ramp to southbound SR 76 and provides access to City Stadium; the ramps to and from the north have ramp toll plazas. A pair of ramps to and from the south that lead to SR 147 (Cary Street) and SR 6 (Patterson Avenue) split from the freeway just south of its northern terminus at I-195 (Beltline Expressway). The interchange with I-195 is a partial interchange, providing access between SR 76 and I-195 to the north toward I-95 and I-64.

== Tolls ==
As of 2023, toll rates for automobiles on the Richmond section of SR 76 are $1.00 at the mainline toll plaza and at the Forest Hill ramp plazas, and 50 cents at the Douglasdale Road ramp plazas. As of 2005, toll rates on the Chesterfield County section of the freeway are 75 cents for through traffic at the mainline toll plaza, 25 cents for traffic exiting onto SR 653 at the mainline toll plaza, 50 cents at the SR 653 ramp toll plazas, and 25 cents at the US 60 ramp toll plazas.

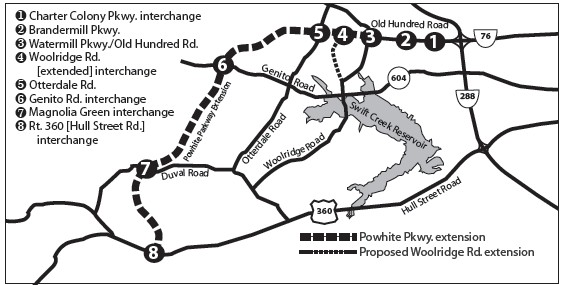
Proposed Powhite extension connecting with Hull Street, Duval, Genito, and Woolridge Road.

== History ==
The original section of Powhite Parkway from I-195 to SR 150 within the city of Richmond was constructed by the Richmond Metropolitan Authority and opened in January 1973. The toll road's extension southwest beyond SR 288 in Chesterfield County was constructed by VDOT and opened in November 1988. Electronic toll collection began on the Powhite Parkway in 1999 when the Smart Tag system began operating at the highway's toll plazas. The freeway became E-ZPass accessible when Smart Tag was absorbed into the E-ZPass system in 2005. The Richmond mainline toll plaza was reconstructed with staggered plazas for each direction and Express E-ZPass lanes in 2008. Long-term plans exist for an extension of Powhite Parkway to US 360 near Skinquarter.

== Exit list ==
County	Location	mi	km	Destinations	Notes
Chesterfield		0.00	0.00	SR 652 (Old Hundred Road)	Southern terminus
Chesterfield				To Charter Colony Parkway (SR 754) / US 60 / US 360	At-grade intersection
Chesterfield		1.29	2.08	SR 288 to I-64 / I-95 / US 60 / US 360 – Midlothian, Amelia, Chesterfield	Cloverleaf interchange
Chesterfield				Toll plaza	
Chesterfield		3.29	5.29	SR 653 (Courthouse Road)	Diamond interchange
Chesterfield				SR 955 (Arboretum Parkway)	Westbound exit and entrance
Chesterfield	Bon Air	6.36	10.24	US 60 (Midlothian Turnpike) – Midlothian, Richmond	Cloverleaf interchange
Chesterfield	Bon Air	8.78	14.13	SR 686 (Jahnke Road) to SR 150 south	
Chesterfield	Bon Air	9.60	15.45	SR 150 (Chippenham Parkway) to SR 147	no direct access from SR 76 north to SR 150 south or SR 150 north to SR 76 south
City of Richmond		10.83	17.43	Forest Hill Avenue	Southbound exit and northbound entrance; former SR 417
City of Richmond				Toll gantry	
City of Richmond				Powhite Parkway Bridge over James River	
City of Richmond		12.10	19.47	SR 195 Toll east (Downtown Expressway via SR 146) to I-64 east / I-95 south – Petersburg, Norfolk, Richmond International Airport	Northbound exit and southbound entrance
City of Richmond		12.10	19.47	Douglasdale Road / McCloy Street – City Stadium	
City of Richmond		13.04	20.99	SR 147 (Cary Street) / Floyd Avenue	Northbound exit and southbound entrance
City of Richmond		13.04	20.99	I-195 north to I-64 west / I-95 north – Charlottesville, Washington	Northern terminus
1.000 mi = 1.609 km; 1.000 km = 0.621 mi: Incomplete access; Tolled
