= Richmond Metropolitan Transportation Authority =

The Richmond Metropolitan Transportation Authority is an independent authority and political subdivision which serves the Richmond, Virginia metropolitan area. Created by an act of the Virginia General Assembly in 1966, then called the Richmond Metropolitan Authority, the RMTA was originally tasked with building and maintaining a toll expressway system for the Richmond area. Since then, the role of the RMTA has been expanded, and it currently owns and operates other facilities, including a number of parking decks. The RMTA built and previously owned The Diamond, home stadium of the Richmond Braves minor league baseball team until 2008, and the current home of the Richmond Flying Squirrels. The Authority also operates historic Main Street Station on behalf of the City of Richmond.

Facilities operated by the RMTA include:

- Downtown Expressway
- Powhite Parkway
- Boulevard Bridge
- Main Street Station
