= Interstate 195 (Virginia) =

Highway in Virginia

Interstate 195
- Beltline Expressway
- I-195 highlighted in red

Route information
- Auxiliary route of I-95
- Maintained by VDOT
- Length: 3.24 mi (5.21 km)
- Existed: c. 1970–present
- NHS: Entire route

Major junctions
- South end: SR 146 / SR 195 Toll in Richmond
- SR 76 in Richmond; SR 147 in Richmond; US 33 / US 250 in Richmond
- North end: I-64 / I-95 in Richmond

Location
- Country: United States
- State: Virginia
- Counties: City of Richmond, Henrico

Highway system
- Interstate Highway System; Main; Auxiliary; Suffixed; Business; Future; Virginia Routes; Interstate; US; Primary; Secondary; Byways; History; HOT lanes
← SR 194	→ SR 195

Interstate 195 (I-195) is an auxiliary Interstate Highway in the US state of Virginia. Known as the Beltline Expressway, the highway runs 3.24 miles (5.21 km) from State Route 195 (SR 195), a toll road that continues south into Downtown Richmond, north to I-64 and I-95 on the northern edge of Richmond. I-195 passes through the West End of Richmond and connects I-64 and I-95 with US Route 33 (US 33) and US 250, which follow Broad Street, and with SR 76, a toll road that links Richmond with the Southside of the metropolitan area.

== Route description ==
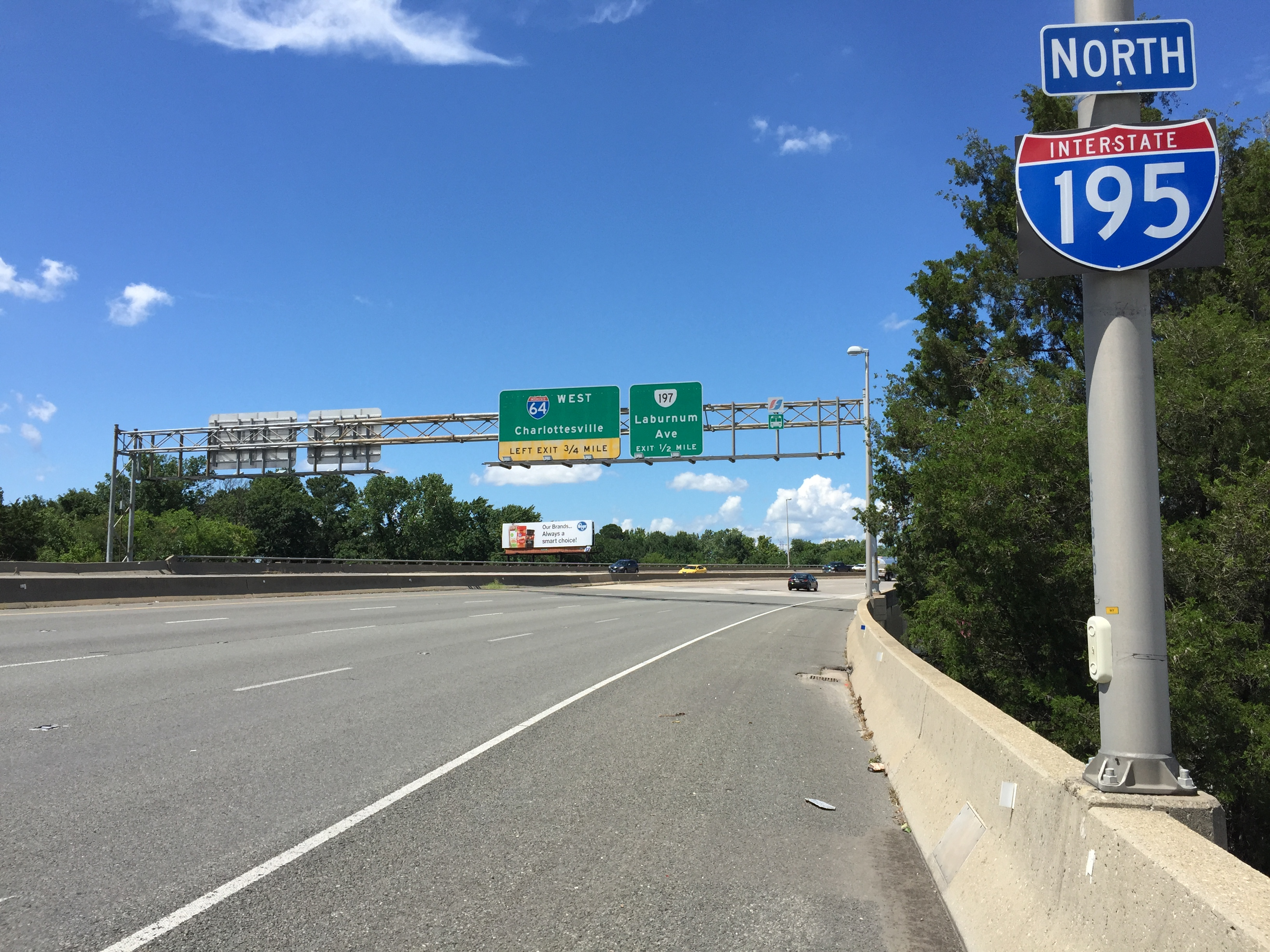
View north along I-195 near SR 197 in Richmond

I-195 begins as a continuation of SR 195 (Downtown Expressway), a toll road that connects I-195 with I-95 in Downtown Richmond. The transition between the Interstate and the state-numbered highway occurs just east of the McCloy Street overpass south of the Carytown district of Richmond. The four-lane freeway gains a pair of lanes just west of the transition where there is a southbound exit ramp for Rosewood Avenue, which leads to City Stadium, and a northbound entrance ramp from Idlewood Avenue. Northbound I-195 has an exit for SR 147 (Cary Street) and Floyd Avenue, while a ramp from SR 147 joins the southbound Interstate as the highway curves north on a pair of two-lane flyover ramps to join the six lanes of SR 76 (Powhite Parkway) that join the Interstate at that toll road's northern terminus.

I-195 continues northeast as a six-lane freeway; its median is occupied by CSX Transportation's two-track North End Subdivision, which is also used by Amtrak. The southbound I-195 has an exit ramp to Hamilton Street, which parallels the highway to the west, to serve SR 147 and Grove Avenue. A short distance to the north, northbound I-195 has exit and entrance ramps to and from Thompson Street, which parallels the Interstate to the east, to access SR 6 (Patterson Avenue) and Grove Avenue. North of Monument Avenue, from which the southbound direction receives a ramp, I-195 has a multipart interchange with Broad Street, which carries US 33 and US 250. The southbound freeway receives a ramp from Hamilton Street, and the northbound freeway has an exit ramp to Clay Street north of the Broad Street overpass. After the overpass, northbound I-195 crosses over the North End Subdivision, and both directions pass under Hamilton Street, with which the freeway has a half diamond interchange that allows access to US 33 and US 250 from the north.

I-195 passes through an industrial area in which the highway crosses over SR 197 (Westwood Avenue) and CSX Transportation's Acca Yard just north of its wye junction with the North End Subdivision. While on the viaduct, the Interstate briefly enters Henrico County. North of the S-curved viaduct, I-195 has a three-quarter diamond interchange with the western end of Laburnum Avenue, which provides access to SR 197. The interchange's north-facing ramp is from eastbound I-64 within the Bryan Park Interchange, a three-level stack interchange with multiple flyover ramps where I-195 reaches its northern terminus at I-64 and I-95 south of Bryan Park at the northernmost point in the city of Richmond. Ramps to southbound I-195 converge and ramps from northbound I-195 diverge for westbound I-64 toward Charlottesville, northbound I-95 toward Washington, and eastbound I-64 and southbound I-95 (Richmond–Petersburg Turnpike) toward Downtown Richmond, where the Interstates diverge toward Norfolk and Petersburg, respectively.

== Exit list ==
County	Location	mi	km	Destinations	Notes
City of Richmond		0.00	0.00	SR 195 Toll east / I-64 to I-95 south – Downtown Richmond SR 146 ends	Southern terminus; I-195 continues south as SR 195; eastern terminus of SR 146
City of Richmond		0.00	0.00	Rosewood Avenue – City Stadium	Southbound exit and northbound entrance
City of Richmond				SR 147 (Cary Street) / Floyd Avenue / Grove Avenue	No northbound entrance
City of Richmond		0.48	0.77	Powhite Parkway (SR 76 south) to SR 150 / US 60 / US 360	Southbound exit and northbound entrance
City of Richmond		1.27	2.04	SR 6 (Patterson Avenue) / Grove Avenue	No southbound exit
City of Richmond		1.68	2.70	US 33 / US 250 (Broad Street) / Hamilton Street	
Henrico	No major junctions				
City of Richmond		2.62	4.22	SR 197 (Laburnum Avenue)	Northbound exit and southbound entrance
City of Richmond		3.50	5.63	I-64 / I-95 – Charlottesville, Washington, Norfolk, Petersburg	Northern terminus; I-64 exit 186; I-95 exit 79
1.000 mi = 1.609 km; 1.000 km = 0.621 mi: Incomplete access
