= Virginia State Route 195 =

State highway in the City of Richmond, Virginia, US

State Route 195 Toll
- Downtown Expressway

Route information
- Maintained by Richmond Metropolitan Transportation Authority
- Length: 3.39 mi (5.46 km)
- Existed: 1976–present

Major junctions
- West end: I-195 / SR 146 in Richmond
- US 1 / US 301 in Richmond; US 60 in Richmond
- East end: I-95 in Richmond

Location
- Country: United States
- State: Virginia
- Counties: City of Richmond

Highway system
- Virginia Routes; Interstate; US; Primary; Secondary; Byways; History; HOT lanes
| ← I-195 | → SR 196 |

State Route 195 (SR 195) is a controlled-access toll road in the U.S. state of Virginia. Known as the Downtown Expressway, the state highway runs 3.39 miles (5.46 km) from Interstate 195 (I-195) east to I-95 within the independent city of Richmond. SR 195 connects the West End of Richmond with Downtown Richmond. In conjunction with another toll road, SR 76, the state highway also connects the Southside suburbs of the metropolitan area with downtown. SR 195 has a mainline barrier toll plaza and ramp toll plazas at its interchanges with U.S. Route 1 and US 301 and with US 60, all of which accept E-ZPass. The state highway was constructed in the mid- to late 1970s and is maintained by the Richmond Metropolitan Transportation Authority.

== Route description ==
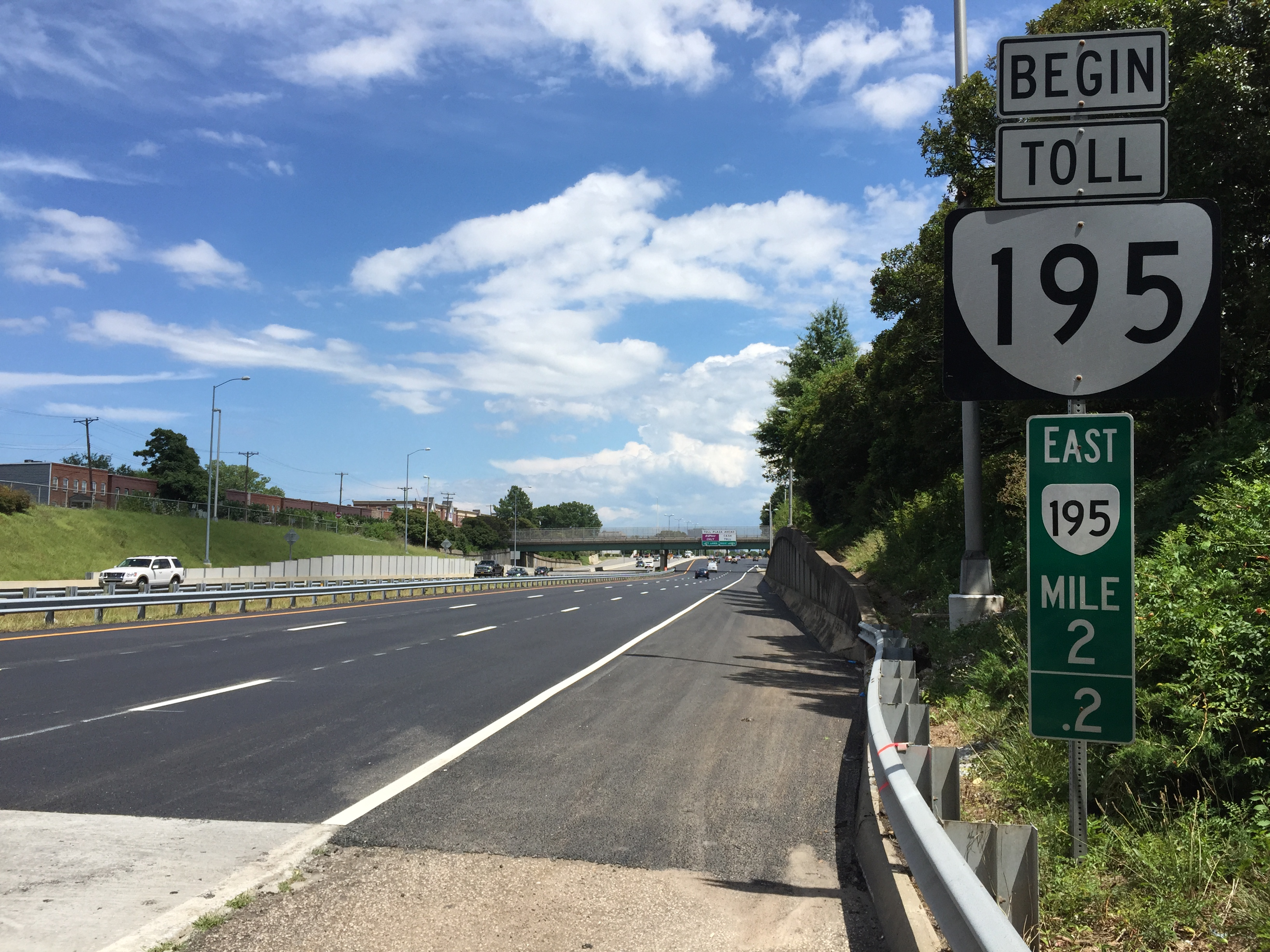
View east at the west end of SR 195 at I-195 and SR 146 in Richmond

SR 195 begins as a continuation of I-195, an Interstate Highway that connects SR 195 and SR 76 with I-95 and I-64 at the northern edge of the city of Richmond. The transition between the Interstate and the state-numbered highway occurs just east of the McCloy Street overpass south of the Carytown district of Richmond. Four-lane SR 195 passes under Idlewood Avenue and has a partial interchange with SR 146, which comprises extended ramps between SR 195 and SR 76 (Powhite Parkway). The freeway expands to six lanes at its interchange with SR 146 which, like its interchange with SR 161 (Boulevard) immediately to the east, allows access to and from the direction of Downtown Richmond. SR 195 is paralleled by Grayland Avenue to the south and Parkwood Avenue to the north and has another partial interchange with Meadow Street before reaching the 12-lane Downtown Expressway Toll Plaza.

SR 195 has an eastbound exit and westbound entrance for US 1 and US 301 (Belvidere Street); the ramps merge to and from Idlewood Avenue and Cumberland Street, a one-way pair that parallels the south and north sides, respectively, of the freeway and connect the ramps with the U.S. Highways. At the Belvidere Street overpass, SR 195 curves southeast and drops to four lanes at an eastbound exit and westbound entrance for a new pair of paralleling streets, Byrd Street to the south and Canal Street to the north, that connect with 2nd Street. Underneath 2nd Street, there is a westbound exit and eastbound entrance to the paralleling streets that connect US 1 and US 301 with the freeway toward Downtown Richmond; both ramps have a ramp toll plaza. SR 195 passes under Kanawha Plaza in a pair of tunnels. On either end of the tunnel, there are half-diamond interchanges that connect with US 60 (9th Street); the half-interchange over 11th Street east of the tunnels has ramp toll plaza. There is also an entrance ramp westbound from Canal Street and 12th Street. East of 12th Street, SR 195 ascends onto a two-level viaduct—eastbound on the upper level and westbound on the lower level—east to its directional interchange with I-95 (Richmond–Petersburg Turnpike) at the north end of James River Bridge just east of the railroad Triple Crossing at the southeastern corner of Downtown Richmond.

== Tolls ==
As of 2023, the toll rate for automobiles at the Downtown Expressway Toll Plaza is $1.00. Toll rates for the 2nd Street (US 1 and US 301) and 11th Street (US 60) ramps are 50 cents. All toll plazas accept E-ZPass.

== History ==
The first section of SR 195 opened from I-195 to 7th Street in February 1976. The remainder of the toll road and its ramps to I-95 in the direction of Washington were completed in August 1976. The ramps between SR 195 and I-95 in the direction of Petersburg opened in September 1976.

== Criticism ==
The Downtown Expressway has been criticized for a lack of urban sensitivity ever since the project was proposed in the early 1970s. Its construction destroyed hundreds of homes in Oregon Hill among other neighborhoods like the Historically Black neighborhood of Randolph, and cuts off pedestrian traffic to the river front. The lack of mixed use urban activation along the downtown Richmond riverfront and surrounding the highway in general has been linked to the expressway. Some have even suggested a removal or renovation in the manner of San Francisco's Embarcadero or Boston's Big Dig.

== Exit list ==
The entire route is in Richmond.

| mi | km | Destinations | Notes |
|---|---|---|---|
| 0.00 | 0.00 | I-195 north to I-64 / I-95 – Charlottesville, Washington | Western terminus; SR 195 continues as I-195 |
| 0.27 | 0.43 | Powhite Parkway (SR 76 south via SR 146) to SR 150 / US 60 / SR 288 | Westbound exit and eastbound entrance |
| | | SR 161 (Boulevard) | Westbound exit and eastbound entrance |
| | | Meadow Street | Westbound exit and eastbound entrance |
| | | Toll plaza | |
| 2.37 | 3.81 | US 1 / US 301 (Belvidere Street) | |
| | | Byrd Street / 2nd Street | Eastbound exit and westbound entrance |
| | | US 60 (9th Street) / 7th Street | Eastbound exit and westbound entrance |
| | | To US 60 / Canal Street | Westbound exit and eastbound entrance |
| 3.39 | 5.46 | I-95 to I-64 – Washington, Charlottesville, Norfolk, Petersburg, Richmond International Airport | Exit 74 (I-95) |
1.000 mi = 1.609 km; 1.000 km = 0.621 mi: Incomplete access; Tolled
