= Bon Air Presbyterian Church =

Historic church in Bon Air, Virginia, United States

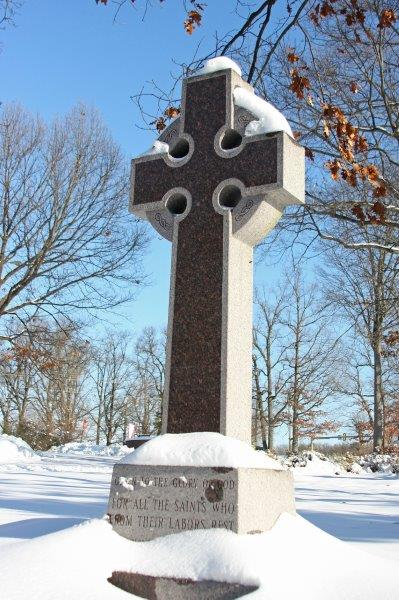
Snow-covered Celtic cross

Bon Air Presbyterian Church (PCUSA), which began in 1884, is an historic Presbyterian church and preschool located on Huguenot Road in Bon Air, Virginia, a census-designated place (CDP) in Chesterfield County, Virginia, in the United States. The church and its location are thought to be named after the French term for "good air". The name choice may have been influenced by the 18th century settlement in the region of religious refugee French Huguenots and by the later popularity of the settlement as a summer resort and park accessible by streetcar from Richmond. Bon Air Presbyterian Church first began worshiping in a little Victorian Gothic building known as the “Union Chapel", located on Buford Road, south of the James River in the Southside of Richmond. "Union Chapel" served the Bon Air Presbyterian congregation until 1963. The number of members grew, and a new church building was erected at 9201 West Huguenot Road in North Chesterfield, Virginia to meet the needs of the larger congregation.

== History ==
=== Original site ===
In early 1882 the Bon Air development company erected the small frame "Union Chapel" north of the Bon Air Hotel on Buford Road. Originally an ecumenical nondenominational church for worship by residents and visitors, the little chapel became Bon Air Presbyterian Church in 1884. Reverend James K. Hazen served as minister from 1885 until his death in 1902.

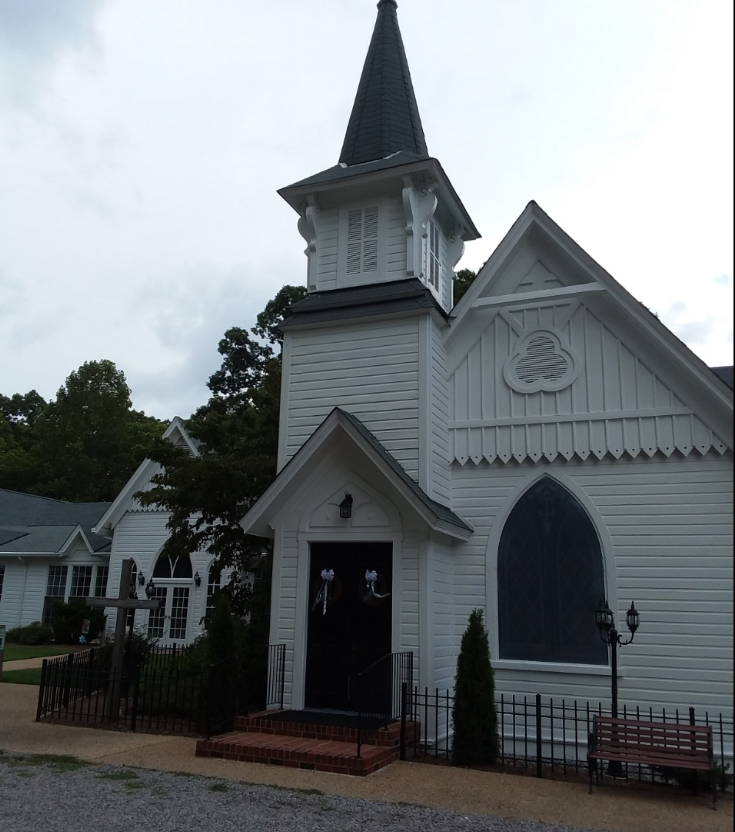
2017-10-27 0951 Original Buford Road site of Bon Air Presbyterian Church as it looks in the 21st century

The Victorian Gothic church building "originally was a long rectangular structure with a steep gable roof adorned with iron cresting and topped by a small open belfry. Small gables were positioned above side windows and the front gable was embellished with vertical boards with decoratively sawn ends, stick gable trusses, and a trefoil window or vent." Most of the features of the original structure remain, but a "tall bell tower with louvered belfry and steeple and a rear transverse addition sympathetic to the original building were added in 1890" by master carpenter Jacob Fraker, a resident of Bon Air. In 1905, Dr. Edwin Brown McCluer became pastor of Bon Air Presbyterian Church. Pastor McCluer was the editor of The Presbyterian Publication of the South before coming to Bon Air.

=== Bethany Home ===
In 1889, a 165-acre tract of land and an old farmhouse were purchased by J.R.F. Burroughs, originally of Lynchburg in Campbell County, and his wife Lucy. They were a childless couple, and a few years later the Burroughs opened an orphanage on the property. Originally called "The Home for Friendless Children", the orphanage was incorporated in 1898. Religiously devout, the couple never solicited for funds for the orphanage, but there are tales of the support they received anyway. When Mr. Burroughs died in 1915, he was buried at a site now surrounded by neighboring apartments, where his tombstone reads "Faithful unto Death". Burroughs Street in Bon Air was named for the couple. After Burroughs' death, "The Home for Friendless Children" was taken over by others, and became known as the "Bethany Home for Friendless Children", possibly named after Bethany Home in Ireland.

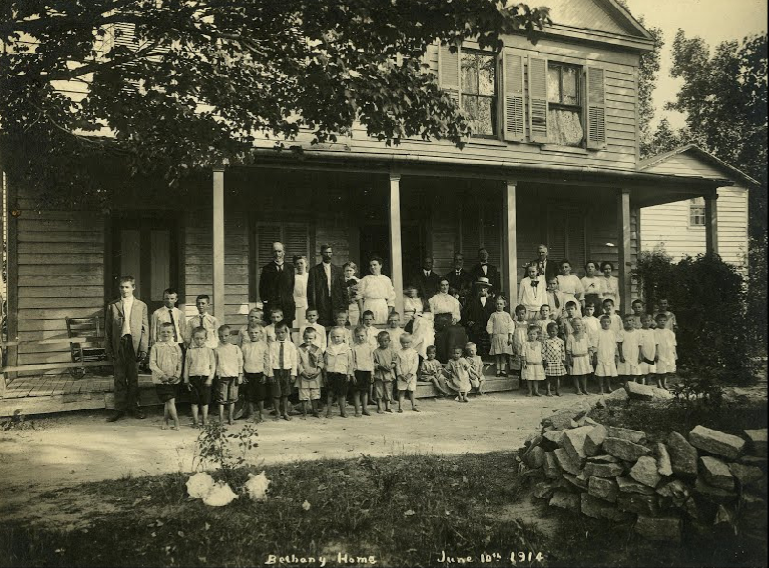
2017-08-08 1150 Bethany Home, June 10, 1914

The orphanage was supported by the community, notably including Bon Air Presbyterian Church, until it closed during the 1940s. A 1936 newspaper article in the Richmond Times-Dispatch stated that over a thousand children had known the farm as "home", maintaining an average of 50 boys and girls at a time. One of the buildings of the Bethany Home survived into the second half of the twentieth century and was long used as an adult home for the elderly and disabled.

In the 1970s BAPC supported the Bon Air School for Girls, a home for juvenile girls, and in the 20th century members volunteered time and social support to boys and girls at the Bon Air Juvenile Correctional Center. During the COVID-19 pandemic in 2020, the Bon Air Juvenile Correctional Center experienced cases of juvenile inmates testing positive for COVID-19.

The oldest lending Library in Chesterfield County was built in 1902 by the Bon Air Association as a memorial to Dr. James K. Hazen, the first minister of Bon Air Presbyterian Church and a literary and educational leader of the community. In 1967 Chesterfield County began to operate the Bon Air Public Library and moved its location in 1975, according to a plaque on the historic old original Hazen Library building.

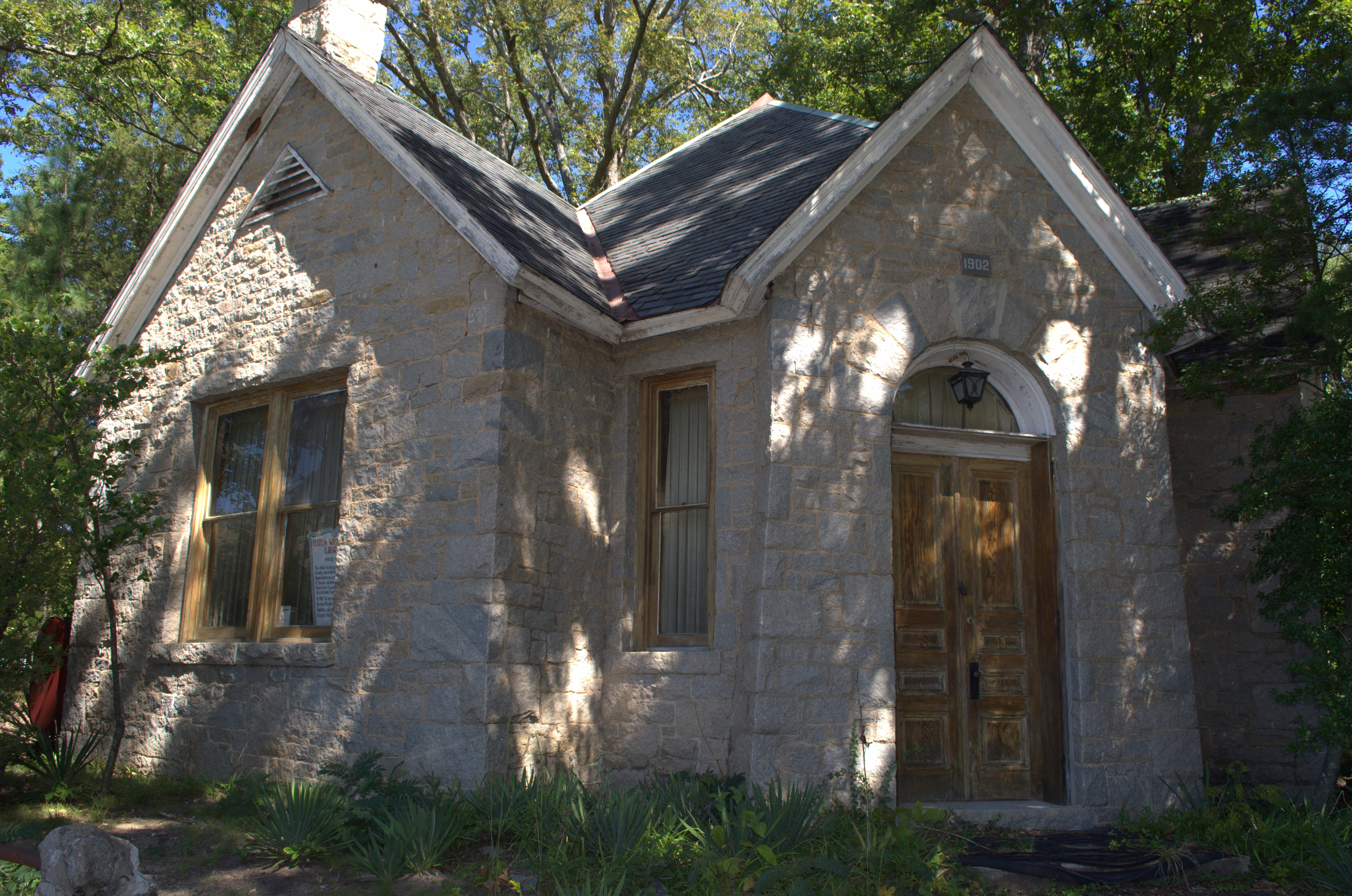
Bon Air Library named for Rev. Dr. James K. Hazen

=== Move to Huguenot Road ===
On Palm Sunday in 1963, the Bon Air Presbyterian Church held its first service in their new church, and the little original Presbyterian chapel became the place of worship for the Bon Air Christian Church. By 1995, the new Bon Air Presbyterian Church building was expanded to include a larger sanctuary, fellowship hall, kitchen, classrooms, and a redesigned roof that covered all of the church’s additions. In 2018 a lengthy architectural renovation and updating to make the building safer and more handicapped-accessible was completed. Improvements included adding Wi-Fi and updating audio-visual projectors, screens, and sound systems.

== Church government and administration ==
The history of the Presbyterian Church in the United States has been a record of divisions and mergers mainly over doctrinal issues such as slavery, science, and modern philosophy within the church . The Presbyterian Church of the United States of America's “Book of Order” provides information concerning the PCUSA beliefs. The Bon Air Presbyterian Church is a member of the Presbyterian Church (U.S.A.), which is the largest part of the overall Presbyterian denomination. The Presbyterian Church (U.S.A.) was formed in 1983 when the Presbyterian Church in the U.S. (PCUS) and the United Presbyterian Church in the U.S.A. (UPCUSA) merged. Its national offices are located in Louisville, Kentucky. BAPC is part of the James Presbytery and the Mid-Atlantic Synod. The theory of governance at BAPC follows that developed in Geneva under John Calvin and was introduced to Scotland by John Knox after his period of exile in Geneva. It is associated with French, Dutch, Swiss, English and Scottish movements of the Protestant Reformation.

Pastors of the BAPC church have included Rev. James K. Hazen, Dr. Edwin Brown McCluer, John Marion (1950-1955), Richard Perkins (1960-1967), Rev. Dr. Robert Richardson (1968-1973) Rev. Robert Busey (1974-1992), Rev. Dr. Charles Grant (1994-2010), Rev. Dr.Janet Winslow, Senior Pastor(2012-2020 ), and Rev. Lauren Ramseur, Covenant Pastor.

== Education, missions, and community outreach ==
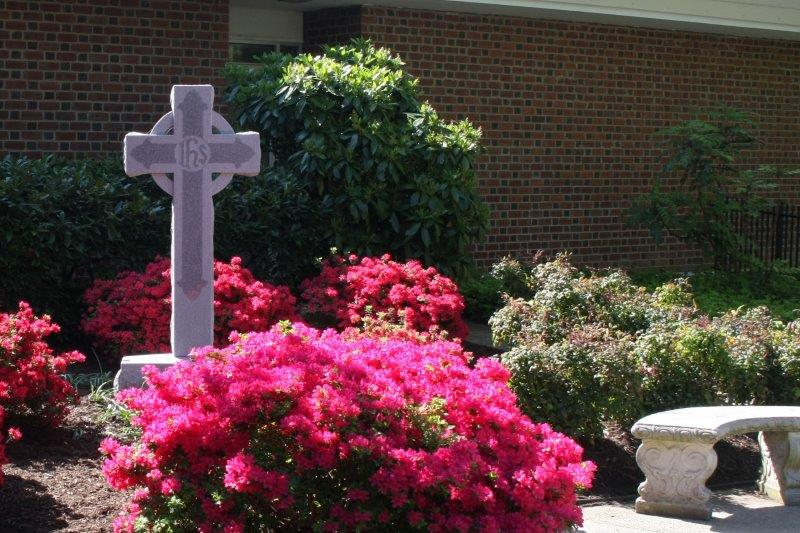
Celtic cross with azaleas in Memorial Garden at BAPC

Union Theological Seminary & Presbyterian School of Christian Education, founded by the Presbyterian Church, is located in north-side Richmond, Virginia, across the James River, and is a major educational, ministerial, and collaborative resource for Bon Air Presbyterian Church (BAPC).

A "children's conversation" is part of the regular Sunday Services at BAPC, and Communicants' classes are offered. Youth of BAPC attend the Presbyterian Camp Hanover in Hanover County, Virginia. BAPC members often go to Montreat, North Carolina, a small town named with a portmanteau for the words "mountain" and "retreat." In 1907 the management of the Mountain Retreat Association (MRA) passed to the Presbyterian Church in the US, and has long served as the site of religious conferences, mainly Presbyterian, organized as worshipful retreats. A members' newsletter Outreach, with both a print and online version, is published monthly by BAPC.

Former BAPC youth director Jeff Kellam, an ordained Presbyterian minister, maintained a radio “Showcase,” winning a national award in 1972. His radio programs became the prototype of the syndicated “Celebration Rock,” "combining rock music with a gentle gospel message." He also served BAPC as an associate minister.

=== Preschool ===
Bon Air Presbyterian Preschool (BAPP) uses the Reggio Emilia approach to education and is committed to the creation of conditions for learning that will enhance and facilitate children’s construction of “his or her own powers of thinking through the synthesis of all the expressive, communicative and cognitive languages” (Edwards and Forman, 1993).

=== Community meeting center ===
The church serves as a meeting center for such activities as church women's circles, GRIVA (Genealogical Research Institute of Virginia), Alcoholics Anonymous, Caritas, Yoga, American Association of University Women, Camp Hanover Art and Music Academy Summer Camp for children, and running exercise classes for adults.

A stage with a screen in the Fellowship Hall accommodates theatrical, musical, and educational presentations with an adjoining kitchen for preparing Wednesday Night Suppers and meals for other church events.

=== Charitable services ===
Community services by BAPC members include filling Salvation Army Christmas stockings after choosing recipients specified by age and gender and their wish list. Members of BAPC knit prayer shawls which are dedicated during a chosen Sunday dedication service to be given for comfort to members of the congregation, and others who are in crisis. Some of the shawls are also given to McGuire Veterans Hospital in Richmond. During a morning worship service, congregants have the opportunity to come forward to the altar, touch the shawls, and offer prayers of healing.

The church's prison ministry has involved assistance to the Bon Air Juvenile Correctional Center which is a placement facility serving a coed population of males age 14-18 and females age 11-20 who have been committed by the juvenile court. The Voices of Jubilee, Gospel Choir & Ministry in Bon Air Juvenile Correction Center was started by Revs. Lauren Cogswell Ramseur and Ashely Diaz Mejias in 2019.

In summer of 2017 a group of BAPC church members went to West Virginia to help re-build areas damaged by flood waters. In 2019, a disaster relief team from BAPC worked to repair homes in Wilmington, North Carolina.

As part of its Interfaith programs, a group of BAPC members contribute to RISC (Richmonders in Service to the Community) with their time, active participation in leadership roles, and financial support of that interfaith community service group.

=== Interdenominational activities ===
Bon Air Presbyterian Church has sponsored and participated in several series of interdenominational trialogues uniting discussion groups of churches of Abrahamic religious faiths. Bon Air Presbyterian Church engages in interfaith trialogues and community programs with St. Edward Catholic Church, Bonay Kodesh Congregation, Or Ami Congregation, Bon Air Baptist Church, Huguenot Road Baptist Church, and the Islamic Center of Virginia which launched its 10th Annual Interfaith Dialogue in 2017. The participants chose as the 2017 topic “Encountering the Other: Living out our Faith Imperatives.” The aim of the gatherings is to deepen mutual understanding and appreciation between the three Abrahamic religious communities. CARITAS (Congregations Around Richmond Involved To Assure Shelter) was organized in the early 1980s to respond to the huge unmet need for emergency shelter for homeless adults in cold winter months. BAPC actively participates in the Shelter program run by Caritas every year.

Theater director Bruce Miller, an Elder of Bon Air Presbyterian Church served a three-year term as moderator of the church's Christian Education team. Miller has written and produced a number of faith-based and social justice plays and study guides for Barksdale Theatre, Virginia Repertory Theatre, Theatre IV, and the November Theatre. Miller has also worked on theater projects for the blind, pursuing his goal of making theater experiences accessible to all. During the COVID-19 pandemic, when BAPC members could not congregate, Miller taught a Bible study group series of classes via Zoom.

In 2019, a group of BAPC members visited the Holy Land, worshiping in both Palestine and Israel. Some of those from BAPC making this pilgrimage were baptized in the Jordan River and walked the Stations of the Cross on the Via Dolorosa.

== Worship ==
The Sacrament of Holy Communion is offered on the first Sunday of each month and on other feast days and special occasions. All baptized persons are welcome at the Lord’s Table. A music minister of BAPC was Steve Henley. Henley sometimes was a guest organist at Bruton Parish Church in Williamsburg. The hymnal used for congregational singing from the pews is the Presbyterian hymnal Glory to God: The Presbyterian Hymnal (2013) . Handbells are often rung as part of the worship service. BAPC's Second Sunday South of the James Concert Series in 2009 presented The Commonwealth Brass Ensemble, Organ & Timpani. Both the Cornel Zimmer pipe organ with digital augmentation installed in April 2013 replacing the original 1981 Schantz pipe organ and the piano in the sanctuary at Bon Air Presbyterian Church are prized by members and professional guest musicians who play them. Francis L. Church was a Richmond News Leader editor and classical music critic from 1976 until his retirement in 1991. Francis Church was a BAPC choir member and a cellist, and he led the successful drive for purchase of the original pipe organ at the Huguenot Road location of the church. A candlelight Ash Wednesday communion service with a labyrinth leading to the communion table was used at BAPC in 2020. In 2019 BAPC received a grant from the Allan Blank and Margot Blank Foundation for support of the Second Sunday South of the James musical programs.

"Second Sunday South of the James" and The Richmond Chamber Players are two popular concert series at the church. In 2017 the Richmond Chamber Players presented a concert at BAPC honoring American composer Allan Blank, who before his death sometimes attended performances of his compositions at the church. A SSSJ concert in 2017 was Yin Zheng, piano and Aleksandr Haskin, flute. Other musicians have been the Greater Richmond Children's Choir in the Second Sunday South of the James Concert Series, and all Bon Air Presbyterian Church choirs and visiting featured soloists. Each year Handel's Messiah is performed by the church choir and guest musicians during the Christmas season. For its 2019–2020 season, BAPC received a grant from the Allan Blank and Margot Blank Foundation to sponsor that year's SSSJ series.

The church's Covenant Pastor Lauren Ramseur is the youth pastor and has taken groups from BAPC to Montreat Conference Center in North Carolina and has helped to begin and staff a choir program for youth at a correctional center in Bon Air. During Sunday worship services she conducts the "Conversation with Children."

In October 2017, during the 500th anniversary of the Protestant Reformation, Pastor Rev. Dr. Janet Winslow led a group of members on a tour of Scotland to study the history of the Scottish Reformation, with particular attention to the impact of the Protestant reformer John Knox on the Protestant Reformation in general and the Presbyterian faith and creed in particular. The Bon Air Presbyterian Church calendar observes the religious holy days and seasons of Lent, Palm Sunday, Maundy Thursday, Good Friday, Easter, Advent, and Christmas.
