= Bruce Miller =

Bruce Miller may refer to:

- Bruce Miller (producer), American television writer and producer
- Bruce Miller (politician), politician in Alberta, Canada
- Bruce Miller (soil scientist) (1922–2022), New Zealand soil chemist and scientific administrator
- Bruce Miller (diplomat) (born 1960), Australian ambassador
- Bruce Miller (soccer) (born 1957), retired Canadian soccer player
- Bruce Miller (baseball) (born 1947), infielder for the San Francisco Giants baseball team
- Bruce Miller (American football) (born 1987), American football fullback
- Bruce Granville Miller, professor of anthropology
- Bruce Miller (theater director), stage director and producer
