= George C. Gregory =

American lawyer

George Craghead Gregory (July 17, 1878 – August 25, 1956) was an American attorney, businessman, historian, and author. He lived with his wife and seven children at "Granite Hall", an estate located near Granite in northwestern Chesterfield County about 8 miles (13 km) west of Richmond, Virginia.

In 1932, he discovered the foundation of the first brick statehouse (capitol) building (circa 1646) of the Colony of Virginia at Jamestown Island. In 1936, he founded the Jamestowne Society, a lineage organization.

== Birth, education ==
Gregory was born in Granville County, North Carolina on July 17, 1878, to Lucy Jane Brodie and Archibald Hatchett Gregory (1840–1897). His father was born in Lunenburg County, Virginia, and was one of the Virginia Military Institute (VMI) cadets who were ordered by the Governor of Virginia Henry A. Wise to stand guard at the hanging of John Brown at Harper's Ferry in 1859 under the command of VMI Majors William Gilham and Thomas J. "Stonewall" Jackson. During the American Civil War, Captain Gregory was with the Confederate North Carolina Infantry, and was wounded and imprisoned during the war.

One of 10 children, George graduated from the University of Virginia School of Law in 1902. Gregory became a prominent attorney, businessman and land developer in Richmond, Virginia, where he was an officer of Guaranty Trust Company, a predecessor of the modern Bank of America.

== Marriage, family ==
Following her debutante year, 1909–1910, in Richmond, on September 1, 1910, he married Constance Adela Heath (1890–1982) of California at Sonning-on-Thames, England. They made their home at "Granite Hall", which was located near the south side of the James River in Chesterfield County, Virginia, where he had a large mansion erected. It was faced with granite quarried nearby. They had seven children.

Among the children of Constance Adela (née Heath) Gregory and George Craghead Gregory was Edward Meeks "Pope" Gregory (1922–1995). Born at Granite Hall on September 30, 1922, he became an Episcopalian priest in Richmond. He was associated with Christ Church School, Christ-Church, Virginia; St. Mark's Episcopal Church, Richmond, and lastly, St. Peter's Episcopal Church in Richmond. During the era of Massive Resistance and the desegregation crisis post-Brown v. Board of Education in Virginia, when Prince Edward County’s public schools were closed, Gregory raised money for black students to attend private schools from 1959 to 1964. Reverend Meeks held the first gay marriage ceremony in Virginia, on the lawn of St. Peter's Church in Richmond, in August 1978. In 1979, while serving on Richmond'’s Human Relations Commission, Gregory became a big proponent, albeit unsuccessfully, of adding sexual orientation to the city code's nondiscrimination policies.

== Developer: bridging the James River ==
Gregory led the successful effort to build the privately funded Westham Bridge, a toll-bridge, which was completed in 1911. Linking western Henrico and Chesterfield counties, the bridge was located between Bosher's Dam and Williams Island Dam just west of the 7 miles of rapids and falls which constitute the fall line of the James River at Richmond. The Westham Bridge was located just west of the Huguenot Bridge, which was built in 1949 and replaced it. Piers, abutments at each side, and power lines still marked the path in the early 20th century.

Gregory was also involved in a scheme to extend streetcar service from Westhampton Lake (now part of the campus of the University of Richmond) across the Westham Bridge to the suburban resort community of Bon Air. Although grading was done and some roadbed was actually prepared, the plans never materialized. This was possibly due to either weight considerations involving the Westham Bridge or a right-of-way issue in Henrico County, or both. A portion of the graded pathway planned for the streetcar rising from the river survives as Southampton Road. Another stretch became Mohawk Drive in Bon Air.

== Historical activity ==
Gregory and his wife were active in the Virginia Historical Society. He is credited in 1932 with discovering the foundation of the first brick statehouse (capitol) building circa 1646 at Jamestown, Virginia. In 1936, he founded the Jamestowne Society for descendants of stockholders in the Virginia Company of London and the descendants of those who owned land or who had domiciles in Jamestown or on Jamestown Island prior to the year 1700.

== Death ==
Gregory died on August 25, 1956, at a hospital in Richmond. He was buried in Hollywood Cemetery.

== Heritage, memoriam ==
The land surrounding the Gregory family estate, Granite Hall, became the site of a golf course of the Bon Air Country Club after World War II, and a subdivision beginning in 1958. The granite stone manor house remains, fronting on Piney Branch Road, and is occupied as a private residence. Nearby, Granite Hall Avenue winds through the subdivision, now located within the city limits of the independent city of Richmond.

== Books and publications by George C. Gregory ==
- United nations of the world 1906 ISBN B00088HAT8
- Sir Thomas West, 2nd Lord De La Warr 1926 ISBN B0008960OI
- The Ransom work box 1933 ISBN B0008BTR7S
- Nicolas and Jane Martiau, ancestors of Washington 1934 ISBN B0008BU25Y
- Jamestown, first brick state house 1935 ISBN B0008BU2C2
- Log house at Jamestown, 1607 1936 ISBN B0008BU59W
- Parents, uncles and aunts 1992 ISBN B0006P9K82
