= Richmond Boys Choir =

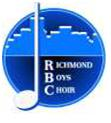
- Formation: 1996 in Richmond, Virginia
- Type: Youth organization
- Legal status: Non-profit organization
- Purpose: "Building a richer humanity for male youth through personal, academic and musical excellence."
- Headquarters: Richmond, Virginia
- Location(s): 200 South 3rd Street Richmond, VA 23219
- Region served: United States
- Key people: Donald Knight II (Chairman); Craig Matthews (Artistic Director)
- Parent organization: Theatre IV and Boys & Girls Clubs of Richmond
- Website: richmondboyschoir.org

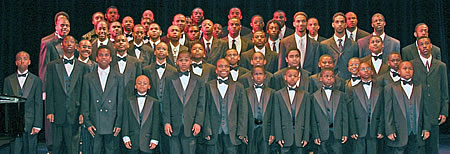
The choir at the 2007 Coming Up Taller Awards.

The Richmond Boys Choir (or RBC) is a boys' choir and non-profit organization in Richmond, Virginia. RBC is funded by donations, sponsorships and federal and state grants.

== History ==
The Richmond Boys Choir was founded in 1996 in Richmond, Virginia, as a collaboration between Theatre IV and the Boys & Girls Club of Richmond. In the fall of 1996 the RBC conducted its first citywide auditions. As a result, approximately 25 boys were chosen for membership. By 1997 RBC became an independent, non-profit 501(c)3. The choir was recognized in 2011 by the Virginia General Assembly as "Richmond's Ambassadors' of Song."

== Performance awards ==
The choir passed its 20th season in 2016 and regularly performs in the community of Richmond and on tour throughout the United States. The choir has also appeared on the nationally syndicated program The Today Show. In 2007, the choir was named a finalist in the National Endowment for the Arts Coming Up Taller Awards. The August 2015 edition of Richmond Magazine names the Richmond Boys Choir the city's best youth choir.
