= Edward Gregory =

Edward Gregory may refer to:

- Edward John Gregory (1850–1909), British painter
- Edward Meeks Gregory (1922–1995), Episcopal priest in Richmond, Virginia
- Ned Gregory (1839–1899), Australian cricketer
- Eddie Gregory (born 1952), boxer
- Ed Gregory (born 1931), basketball player

== See also ==
- Ted Gregory (born 1965), American football player
