= Cooperation Without Submission: Indigenous Jurisdictions in Native Nation–US Engagements =

2021 book by Justin B. Richland

- Cover
- Author: Justin B. Richland
- Language: English
- Subject: Native American law, tribal sovereignty, and US–Tribal relations
- Publisher: University of Chicago Press
- Publication date: September 2021
- Publication place: United States
- ISBN: 978-0-226-60876-1

Cooperation Without Submission: Indigenous Jurisdictions in Native Nation–US Engagements is a 2021 book by American anthropologist Justin B. Richland. Richland investigates the language used during consultations between Native American Tribes and the United States government. Drawing on meetings that show differing views of sovereignty, the book discuss how Tribes assert their nation-to-nation relationships while federal representatives rely on interpretations of federal authority.

== Background ==
In a 2021 interview to the CaMP Anthropology blog, Richland described how the book's genesis stemmed from a series of seemingly unrelated projects involving Tribal governance, alongside his observations about federal consultation regulations. He explained that an inflection point came with the Dakota Access Pipeline protests, which brought into focus the tensions between lengthy government "listening sessions" and Tribal perceptions of not being genuinely heard. Reflecting on the Hopi principle of "cooperation without submission", he underscored the idea that Native participation in official meetings can function simultaneously as a critical stance against settler colonial structures and as a provisional, necessary collaboration with them. He also discussed his method of taking Indigenous norms and knowledge as an analytic framework—rather than an object of inquiry—and highlighted how, in his view, many policy frustrations arise because the United States treats Tribal ways of governing as data to be evaluated rather than sovereign systems in their own right.

== Summary ==
Richland studies how Native American Tribes engage with United States government agencies in a manner that both acknowledges interdependency and preserves Tribal sovereignty. The author traces the historical and contemporary practices through which Tribes insist on their authority, even within the confines of federal regulations. He draws extensively on firsthand observations, transcripts of meetings, and Hopi concepts of interclan coordination to illuminate what he terms "cooperation without submission".

In its opening sections, the book establishes how Native Nations and their representatives have grappled with federal policies meant to shape or limit their self-governance. It places these encounters in the broader context of colonial power structures, describing how many well-intentioned regulations or consultations end up obscuring Indigenous perspectives and legal traditions. The author, then, covers the Hopi theories of sociopolitical order, and explains how these community-specific principles of mutual respect and decentralized authority influence the Tribe's interactions with outside agencies.

The narrative then turns to examples of how Hopi officials, in everyday governmental work, operate on a theory of "juris-diction" that centers Tribal norms, knowledge, and relationships. Richland shows how these practices are sometimes misread or rendered unrecognizable by non-Native institutions, leading to failures in effective policymaking and to persistent misunderstandings of Tribal goals. He then discusses how the management of cultural property, as well as taxation and financial arrangements, become flashpoints that reveal how differently the Hopi and federal authorities conceive of legal authority and consultation. Richland concludes by reflecting on the stakes of ongoing Native Nation–US relationships. He suggests that the genuine recognition of Indigenous jurisdiction can generate fairer and more collaborative outcomes.

== Reviews ==
In his review, Bruce Granville Miller said that the author's theoretical approach, drawn from Hopi concepts, revealed how these encounters supported a decentralized form of authority. Miller noted that the research relied on extensive data, including ethnographic evidence from a Tribal cultural preservation office and federal recognition processes. He judged the book as both compelling and timely.

American historian Hayden L. Nelson observed that the author built on concepts borrowed from Hopi legal and cultural frameworks to propose a method of improving governmental relations. Nelson noted that such an approach encouraged non-Native policymakers to acknowledge Indigenous legal orders rather than view them as subordinate. He also remarked on the longstanding challenges faced by Native groups when outsiders fail to see them as sovereign. "The true marvel of this book", Nelson wrote, "is its assertion of Indigenous sovereignty in the legal landscape." Nelson emphasized that the examination of everyday legal discourse shed light on how Native and non-Native actors understood one another, and he suggested that the analysis could be especially relevant to recent controversies surrounding Plains nations.

Patricia Sekaquaptewa described the publication as a "valuable decoder ring" for non-Native officials seeking to engage meaningfully with Indigenous governments. Sekaquaptewa stressed the text's argument that certain agency practices resulted in "making Indigenous cooperation in these moments unrecognizable" to outsiders. She said that the book supported a deeper understanding of how respect for Indigenous perspectives could improve official policy and relations.
