= The Shops at Willow Lawn =

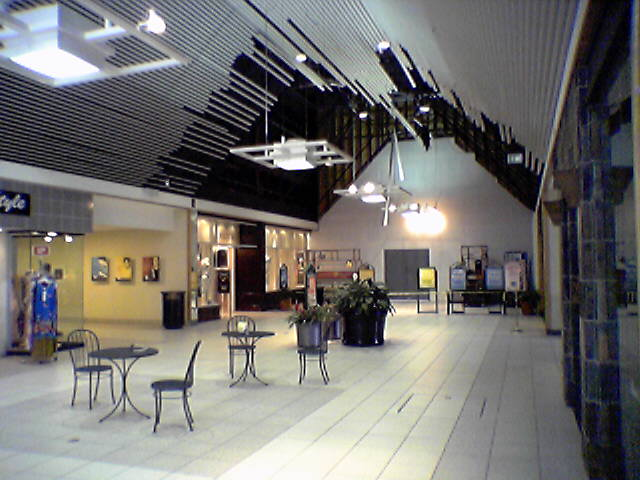
- Remodeling in 2005. The enclosed mall area beyond this point was in the process of being demolished and made into an outdoor shopping center, while the remainder of the mall was remodeled.
- Location: Richmond, Virginia, U.S.
- Coordinates: 37°34′53″N 77°29′51″W
- Opened: 1956 (original indoor mall); 2012 (current outdoor shop)
- Closed: 2011 (original indoor mall)
- Demolished: 2011-2012
- Previous names: Willow Lawn Shopping Center
- Manager: Federal Realty Investment Trust
- Owner: Federal Realty Investment Trust
- Num. of stores: 60
- Num. of anchor tenants: 3 (original indoor mall and current outdoor shop)
- Floor area: 623,000 sq ft
- Floors: 1
- Public transit: GRTC
- Website: www.willowlawn.com

The Shops at Willow Lawn is a shopping center located slightly outside the city limits of Richmond, Virginia in unincorporated Henrico County. It is the first shopping center in the Richmond area. Currently, the center is entirely a strip mall now, the remaining enclosed portion having been demolished and rebuilt. The center features over 60 stores and several restaurants. Federal Realty Trust owns the shopping center.

== History ==
The center, originally called Willow Lawn Shopping Center, opened in 1956. Originally, the center was anchored by G.C. Murphy, Giant Food, JCPenney, Peoples Drug, Safeway, and Woolworth. Safeway later re-located to the former Giant Food space; the original Safeway was torn down for Hess's. This Hess's store, over time, was renamed to Leggett, and then to Belk, which closed in 1998.

In 1986, Federal Realty Trust acquired the shopping center. The middle section of the mall was enclosed that year, creating a hybrid strip mall/enclosed mall. The enclosed portion featured several more stores, as well as a food court. Miller & Rhoads closed in 1988, and was sub-divided into smaller stores and offices.

Through the 1980s, Willow Lawn lost many of its key stores as other malls opened nearby. JCPenney closed in the late 1990s and was replaced with a Hannaford Bros. Co. supermarket, until that chain sold its Richmond locations to Kroger. Peoples Drug became CVS/Pharmacy, which it is to this day. G.C. Murphy and Woolworth also closed; these stores later became Barnes & Noble and Tower Records, respectively.

In 1996, Barksdale Theatre, Central Virginia's leading professional theatre, made The Shops at Willow Lawn its new home. The theatre still presents its Signature Season there today. Theatre IV, the Children's Theatre of VA, occasionally performs at the theatre. Dillard's opened at Willow Lawn in 1998, replacing the former Belk. This Dillard's did not last long, however, and was closed by 2004. The former Dillard's was soon replaced with Gold's Gym and Ross Dress For Less. Barnes & Noble, which opened in the 1990s, moved out in 2000 and was replaced with Staples.

Federal Realty began a renovation of the mall in 2005, taking a portion of the enclosed mall and returning it to an open-air strip. Also in 2005, Ben Franklin Crafts (which was formerly an outparcel) and K & G Fashion Superstore moved into the mall, the latter replacing most of the food court. Tower Records closed in 2006 due to Chapter 11 Bankruptcy liquidation.

In 2011, Willow Lawn began another renovation, demolishing the remnants of the enclosed mall and food court. In 2012, the central section of Willow Lawn is set to reopen with new stores and an open-air courtyard. Old Navy and a few other tenants relocated to stores in other central parts of the existing complex.
