= Bruce Miller (theater director) =

American stage director and dramatist

Bruce Miller (theater director) is a stage director and producer living and working in Richmond, Virginia. In 2017 he received a lifetime achievement award from the Virginia Theatre Association for his work with the Barksdale Theatre, Theatre IV, and Virginia Repertory Theatre.

== Barksdale Theatre ==
Miller served as the artistic director of the Barksdale Theatre. Miller's Barksdale acting credits include Red Hot and Cole and Diamond Studs (Phoebe Award, Best Supporting Actor). Other credits include Arnold in The Boys Next Door, Berenger in Rhinoceros, Clov in Endgame, Tom in The Glass Menagerie, and Yank in The Hasty Heart. Miller's Richmond directing credits include Barksdale’s productions of The Lark, Anything Goes, Annie Get Your Gun, The Crucible, and The Little Foxes. In 2012, Barksdale and Theatre IV merged to become Virginia Repertory Theatre, which Miller co-founded with Phil Whiteway.

== Theatre IV ==
In 1975, along with Phil Whiteway, Miller co-founded Theatre IV as Virginia’s first professional theatre for young audiences, frequently collaborating with his wife, artist and set designer Terrie Powers and creating the Acts of Faith series of plays for multiple Richmond venues. Miller was a founding director and founding producer of Theatre IV and Virginia Repertory Theatre, working with Phil Whiteway whom he met when they were both student actors at the University of Richmond. With Theatre IV Miller wrote and produced Hugs and Kisses, a touring play. "Many people are surprised to learn that Hugs and Kisses, Virginia’s principle child sexual abuse prevention program, is implemented by Theatre IV, the touring arm of Richmond-based Virginia Repertory Theatre," wrote Susan Davenport for Richmond Family Magazine in 2012. In 1986 Theatre IV purchased and occupied the building which had been the Empire Theater on Richmond's Broad Street.

== Virginia Repertory Theatre ==
Virginia Rep, a non-profit organization, was formed in 2012 with the merger of Theatre IV and Barksdale Theatre and grew to be the second largest touring children's theater in the United States, performing in 33 states. In 1975, along with Phil Whiteway, he co-founded Theatre IV as Virginia’s first professional theatre for young audiences, frequently collaborating with his wife, artist and set designer Terrie Powers. He worked with the Acts of Faith series as a founding producer and receiving Phoebe awards. "Bruce Miller is the Founding Artistic Director of Virginia Rep and Founding Artistic Director of Theatre IV. His work as a director has been seen around the country at prominent theatres including the Kennedy Center and the Paper Mill Playhouse." His last show before retiring in July 2016 was Tennessee Williams' 1948 play Summer and Smoke. Miller retired after 41 years with Virginia Repertory Theatre. After 41 years as the Founding Artistic Director, Bruce Miller transitioned to Founding Producer of Virginia Rep in 2016. He co-produced the world premieres of Rules of the Lake by Irene Ziegler, Four Part Harmony by Marcus Fisk and Douglas Minerd, War Story by Bo Wilson and Songs from Bedlam by Douglas Jones. He produced Having Our Say, Frankie and Johnny in the Clair de Lune, and Do Lord Remember Me. Other producing credits include James Joyce’s The Dead, Proof, How I Learned to Drive, Beehive, Of Mice and Men, My Children! My Africa!, and Quilters. In the final two decades of the Phoebe Awards, Bruce’s productions earned Best Play or Best Musical of the Year 20 times. A performing arts study guide about Harriet Tubman was developed by Miller and Whiteway for children in grades four to six, and Miller also wrote a study guide and dramatization of the life and activism of Martin Luther King Jr.

== Biography ==
Bruce Miller's work as a director has been seen around the country at prominent theatres including the Kennedy Center and the Paper Mill Playhouse. He has received six Phoebe Awards as Best Director of the Year. For TV and radio, he directed The Ugly Duckling released nationally by PBS, and a production of folk stories broadcast internationally over Radio Free Europe. He is co-author of Hugs and Kisses, the child sexual abuse prevention play that maintained more than 25 years of a record-breaking run. His play Buffalo Soldier was selected by the Pentagon as a morale booster after 9/11, becoming the first professional play in history to be performed within the Pentagon’s walls. For the Acts of Faith Series at Virginia Rep Children's Theatre, Miller wrote I Have a Dream about Dr. Martin Luther King Jr., who inspired by Christianity and Hinduism, developed his nonviolent civil rights movement protests.

Miller served as a site reporter for three years with the National Endowment for the Arts, and as a professional theatre panelist with the Lila Wallace-Reader's Digest Fund in New York City. He is an alumnus of the University of Richmond, and is privileged to credit three teachers as mentors: Jack Welsh, and the late Marion Waymack and Bernard Schutte. He also thanks those who taught by example: Pete and Nancy Kilgore, Muriel McAuley, Buddy and Betty Callahan, and Lou and Fran Rubin.

In the spring of 1999, STYLE Weekly honored Bruce and Phil Whiteway by selecting them as two of the "100 Most Influential Richmonders of the Century." In 2008 Virginia Governor Timothy M. Kaine announced his selection along with Phil Whiteway of a Governor's Awards for Arts. which have only been awarded three times before - in 1979, 1985 and in 2000. Bruce Miller and Phil Whiteway share an award with Richmond's Theatre IV as the first professional children's theatre in Virginia, which has performed live for audiences totaling 28 million. Upon Bruce Miller's retirement and after a national search, Tony Award winner Nathaniel Shaw was selected to succeed founding producer Bruce Miller as artistic director at Virginia Rep and began his inaugural season in July 2016.

Bruce Miller is married to artist and stage designer Terrie Powers Miller, and they have two children—a daughter, Hannah Powers Miller, born in 1990, and a son, Curtis Wayne Miller, born in 1994. He is an ordained Presbyterian elder and was the moderator of the Christian Education Ministry at Bon Air Presbyterian Church.

The Chesterfield Observer and Richmond Magazine announced in February 2019 that Bruce Miller was chosen to head a new arts center for Chesterfield County, Virginia. Groundbreaking for the Baxter Perkinson Center for the Arts began in June 2019, with Bruce Miller as its executive director.
