= Hanover Tavern =

Historic commercial building in Virginia, United States

- U.S. Historic district – Contributing property
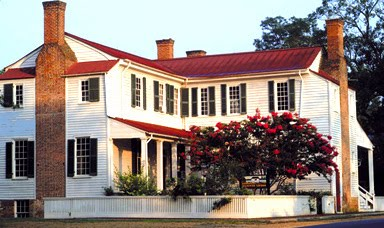
- A view looking across Route 301 from the courthouse green to the Hanover Tavern. Patrick Henry stayed at a predecessor tavern when he argued his famous Parson's Cause at the Hanover Courthouse.

- Location within Virginia Location within the United States
- Nearest city: Hanover, Virginia
- Coordinates: 37°45′43″N 77°22′1″W
- Part of: Hanover County Courthouse Historic District (ID71000980)
- Designated CP: September 22, 1971

The Hanover Tavern is a community center, theatre, and recreational tavern located in Hanover, Virginia. Originally built in 1733, it is one of the oldest taverns in the United States.

== History ==
The first tavern at this site was licensed in 1733 and has continued service without interruption. The inn initially provided food, drink and stable services for travelers.

The Hanover County Courthouse is still an operating courthouse, the third oldest in use in the United States. Located along what is now historic U.S. Route 301, its site was adjacent to the original Shelton Tavern. Founding Father Patrick Henry, married Sarah Shelton, the daughter of John and Eleanor Parks Shelton, the owners of the Tavern from 1750–1764. Henry assisted his father-in-law by greeting and serving guests, tending bar, and entertaining with his fiddle playing. Working at the tavern exposed Henry to the legal world and in April 1760 at the age of 24, he obtained a license to practice law.

During the Revolutionary War, French officers Marquis de Lafayette, Marquis de Chastellux, and Rochambeau visited the Tavern. Chastellux referred to the tavern as a "Tolerable handsome inn, with a large salon and covered portico." In his diary, General George Washington twice refers to dining and lodging at Hanover Courthouse.

In 1800, seven people who were enslaved at Hanover Tavern took part in the planning of a failed slave insurrection known as Gabriel's Rebellion.

During the Civil War the Tavern was used as a home for Confederate refugees fleeing the Union Army.

Notable guests such as Chief Justice John Marshall, Edgar Allan Poe, P. T. Barnum, Charles Dickens, Union General Fitz John Porter, and Confederate generals J.E.B. Stuart and Wade Hampton visited the tavern.

The present tavern building, restored by the Hanover Tavern Foundation, dates from 1791 with early 19th century and late 20th century additions and is listed on the Virginia Landmarks Register and the National Register of Historic Places. The original 1733 tavern building, having fallen into disrepair, was torn down after the construction of the 1822 section. In 1953, a group of actors from New York bought the building and 3.5 acres with the intention of starting a dinner theater. The tavern was adapted as the first dinner theatre in America; Barksdale Theatre. It was the first performing arts organization in Virginia to seat integrated audiences. Barksdale Theatre merged with Theatre IV in 2012 to become Virginia Repertory Theatre.

In 1990, the non-profit Hanover Tavern Foundation bought the Tavern and 3.5 acres from the Barksdale Theatre owners and began to raise the needed money to stabilize and restore the aging building. The Foundation's goal was to restore, preserve and utilize the Tavern as an historical, educational, community and cultural resource center for the general public. The Foundation raised funds, restored historic buildings, and expanded the facility with restrooms, kitchens, and a refurbished theater. The complex reopened to the public in 2005.

Currently, Tavern offered student field trips, educational history programs, historical exhibits, heritage musical events, lecture series, and Virginia Repertory Theatre performances.
