= Powhite Creek =

River in Virginia, United States

Coordinates: 37°32′19.53″N 77°29′58.95″W

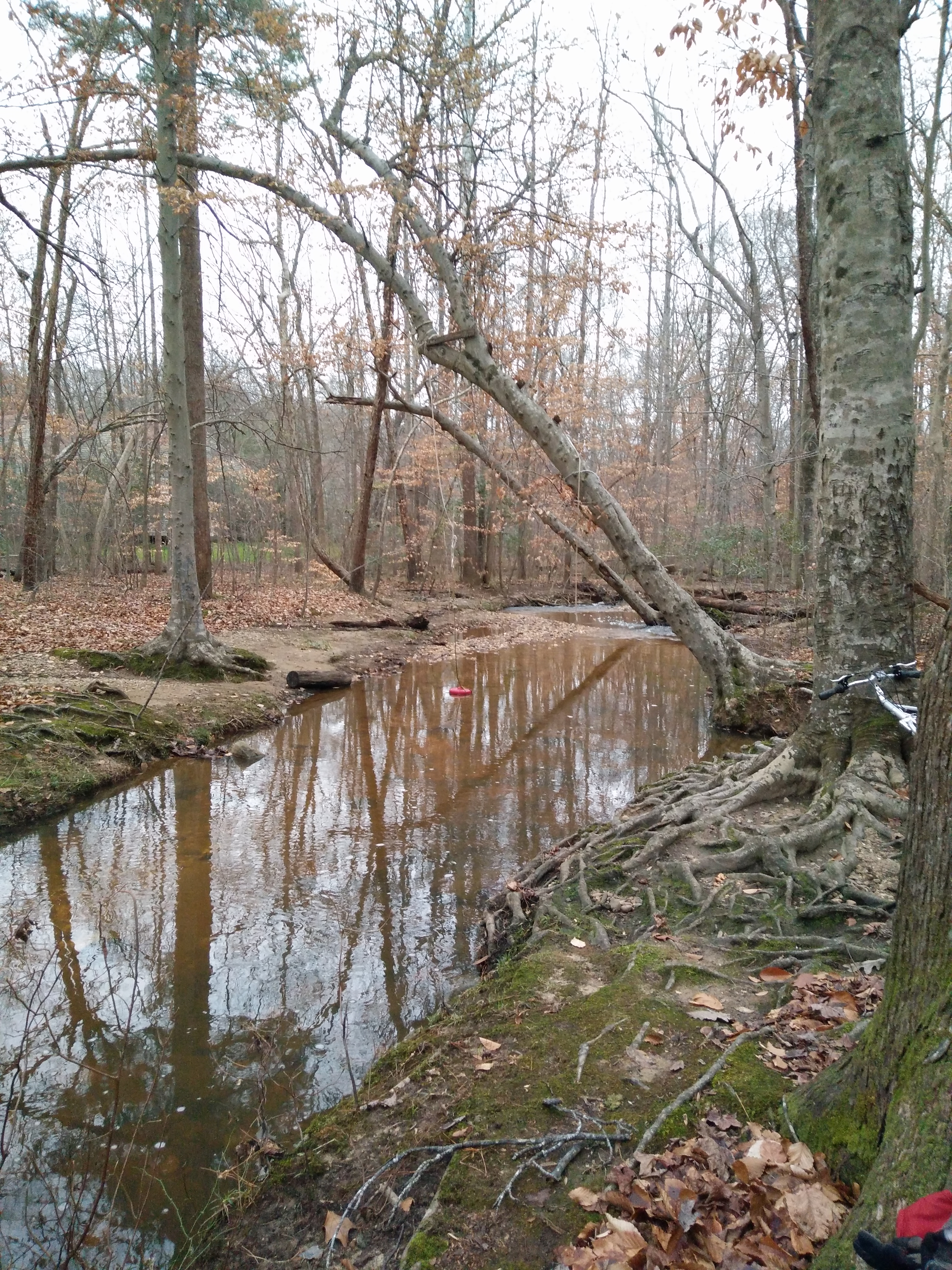
Powhite Creek

Powhite Creek is an 8.0-mile-long (12.9 km) stream rising near the unincorporated community of Bon Air in Chesterfield County and flowing into the independent city of Richmond in central Virginia. The creek empties into the James River in the region of the Fall Line, where the rapids of the James are located upstream from the head of navigation.

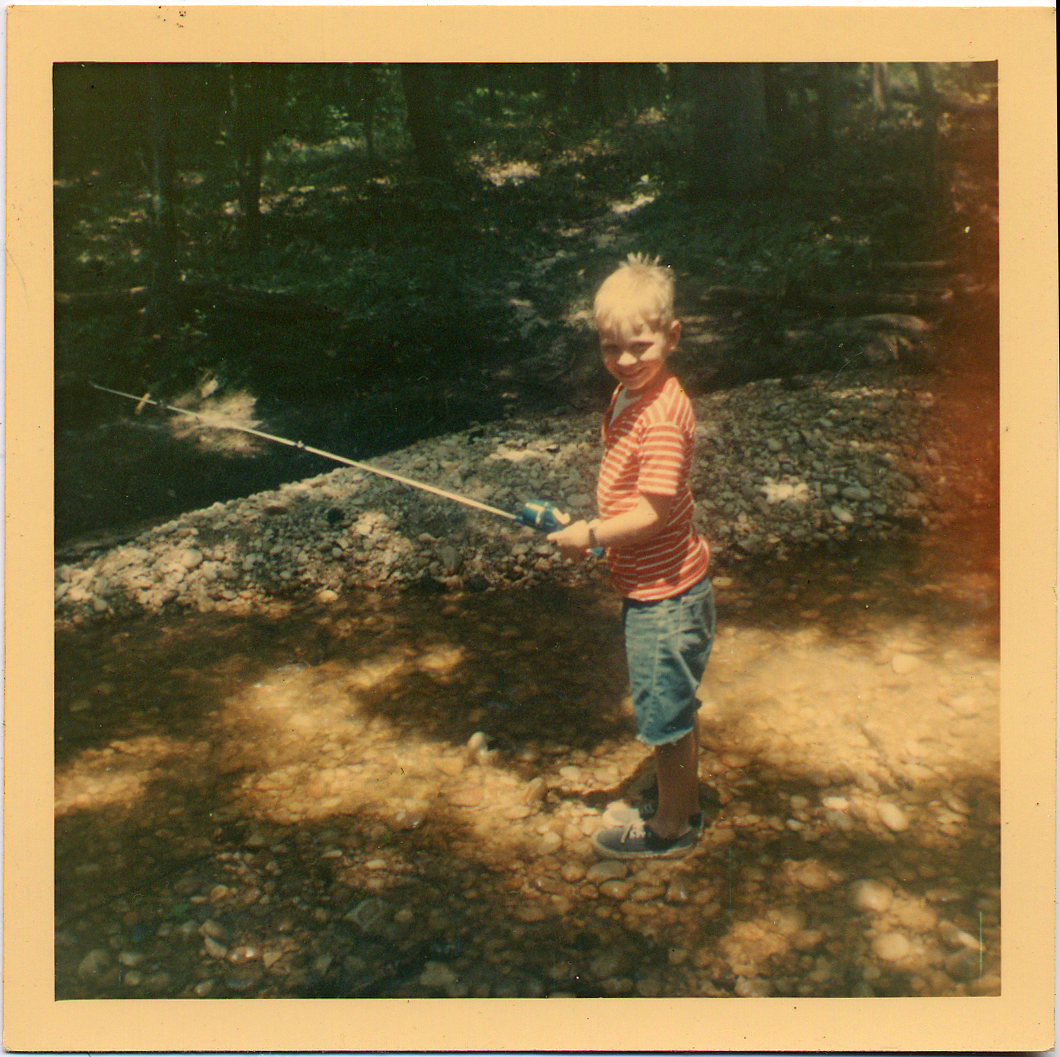
Boy fishing in Powhite Creek, 1969, Bon Air, Virginia

The name is usually pronounced "PO-White" by area residents although it is alternatively pronounced "Pow-Hite." References to Powhite Creek are included in the Vestry Book of Henrico Parish, Virginia, 1730–1773, and in Chesterfield County records of the latter time period. It is mentioned in land records as early as 1687, according to research on the Bratcher family (Margaret Bradshaw).

The nearby Powhite Parkway of the Richmond Metropolitan Authority (RMA) was named for the creek. The toll road (Virginia State Route 76) crosses over the creek and under the Norfolk Southern Railway near the former unincorporated town of Granite. About a mile north, the toll road crosses the river on a bridge just downstream from the mouth of the creek.

== See also ==
- List of rivers of Virginia
