= Allan Blank =

American composer (1925–2013)

- Born: December 27, 1925; New York City, US
- Died: November 12, 2013 (aged 87); Bon Air, Virginia, US
- Education: Juilliard School of Music; Washington Square College; University of Minnesota; University of Iowa
- Occupation: Composer
- Spouse: Margot Blank (died before 2013)

Allan Blank (December 27, 1925 – November 12, 2013) was an American composer who has more than 60 published works. He attended the Juilliard School of Music (1945–47) and obtained a bachelor's degree from Washington Square College (1948). He received a master's degree from the University of Minnesota (1970) and also studied at the University of Iowa. He was a violinist in the Pittsburgh Symphony Orchestra (1950–52). He taught composition at Western Illinois University (1966–68), Paterson State Teachers College (1968–70), Lehman College (1970–77), and at Virginia Commonwealth University (1978–96). In 1990 he was awarded a grant from the Virginia Commission for the Arts to commission his "Concerto for Clarinet and String Orchestra." The concerto was premiered by David Niethamer with the Richmond Symphony Orchestra, George Manahan, conductor. It was recorded on MMC Recordings (2053) in 1994 by Niethamer, performing with the Silesian Philharmonic Orchestra, Jerzy Swoboda, conductor.

Blank became a professor emeritus at VCU and was listed in the New Groves Dictionary of Music and Musicians.

In 1985 he received a commission from the New York State Council on the Arts' Presenting Organization to compose "Quintet for Clarinet and String Quartet" for the Roxbury Chamber Players. Other awards mentioned in his University of Akron Bierce Library Archives composer profile are: First Prize in the George Eastman Competition (1985) sponsored by the Eastman School of Music for his Duo for Bassoon & Piano, and a grant (1985) from the National Endowment for the Arts to support his one-act opera, The Magic Bonbons. The Virginia Shakespeare Festival at Williamsburg commissioned Blank to write music for their production of Measure For Measure.

Blank died at the age of 87 on November 12, 2013, due to complications from the effects of a brain tumor. He was predeceased by his wife, artist Margot Blank, a Holocaust survivor, whose papers are archived at the Virginia Holocaust Museum in Richmond. In 2017 Old Dominion University honored composer Blank with a concert. The composition notebooks of Allan Blank are archived at Old Dominion University.

In 2017 the Richmond Chamber Players performed a concert of music by Sergei Rachmaninoff and Dmitri Shostakovich at Bon Air Presbyterian Church. This concert was dedicated to the memory of Allan Blank, one of the most prolific of Richmond's composers. Violinist Susy Yim and pianist John Walter played Blank's Duo for violin (2011). Blank was a violinist "and his familiarity with the instrument and the technical feats a capable violinist can achieve are audible throughout this short piece." The Richmond Chamber Players' 2017 summer series of four concerts at Bon Air Presbyterian Church was sponsored by the Allan and Margot Blank Foundation and featured a harpsichord on loan from the University of Richmond. The Second Interlude, as the second of the series was called, was in celebration of 300th anniversary of Johann Sebastian Bach's years at Cöthen (1717–1723). Instrumentalists included: Joanne Kong playing the harpsichord; Karen Johnson, violinist; Brandon George, flute; Catherine Cary, violin; and Neal Cary, cello.

== Selected works ==
- Fanfare & Offering (1972), for carillon
- Four Poems by Emily Dickinson, for soprano, flute and clarinet in A
- Ring Out (1972), for carillon
