= Granite, Virginia =

Coordinates: 37°31′59″N 77°30′26″W

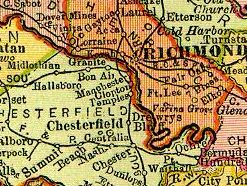
In 1895, Granite was located on the Southern Railway about 5 miles west of Manchester and 3 miles east of Bon Air in Chesterfield County, Virginia

Granite was an unincorporated community in Chesterfield County, Virginia. It was originally located along the Richmond and Danville Railroad five miles west of Manchester and about a mile south of the rapids of the James River along Powhite Creek. Most of the Granite area of Chesterfield County was annexed by the independent city of Richmond on January 1, 1970.

== A community in the stone industry ==
According to documents on file at the Library of Virginia, in April 1872, notice was published in Petersburg that Mathew Hall had been appointed postmaster of a new U.S. Post Office at Granite.

Granite was named for the granite rock formations which underlie the rapids of the river at the geological fall line which begin downstream from the current Williams Island Dam. Mining this granite was the basis for quarries which were located on both sides of the river in the vicinity. Granite stone quarried nearby was used to construct the State, War and Navy building in Washington, D.C., and to build the 3-foot granite walls of Richmond's Gothic City Hall at 10th and Capitol Streets which was completed in 1894. (It became known as "Old City Hall" when replaced in 1972 with a new structure). However, some quarrying operations had already been active in the area since the early 18th century.

Descendants of slaves lived in Granite where they were a substantial labor source for the nearby quarries. Black churches were established, but only a few remnants are indications of the existence of the town and former residents. In the 20th century, they had mostly been displaced by gentrification from the expanding City of Richmond with new roads and residential suburbs such as Stratford Hills and Southampton.

Quarries and companies which operated near Granite were listed in Mineral Resources of Virginia by Thomas Leonard Watson, Ray Smith Bassler, Heinrich Ries, and Roy Jay, published in 1907 as:

- Granite Development Company Quarry
- Hawkins Quarry
- Krim Quarries
- McIntosh Quarries
- Middendorf Quarries
- Netherwood Quarries
- Old Dominion Granite Company's quarries

At that time (1907), Granite Station was located on the Southern Railway (successor to the Richmond and Danville Railroad) and the McIntosh Quarry had a spur track. The McIntosh Quarry furnished the stone used in the approaches and steps in the renovation and expansion of the Virginia State Capitol which had recently been completed (1904–06).

== Suburban growth reaches Granite ==
Manchester merged with Richmond in 1910 and the combined city grew rapidly. Soon Granite was not a remote place. As the land around the Granite area was developed with new streets and housing after World War II, Granite lost its separate identity as suburban growth overtook it. A portion of modern-day Forest Hill Avenue was earlier named Granite Road, and extended from Westover Hills into Chesterfield County, ending at Bon Air.

Most of the Granite area of Chesterfield County was annexed by the independent city of Richmond on January 1, 1970. The neighborhoods in the city in the area of Granite include Granite Acres and Willow Oaks. Nearby, Netherwood Drive was named for the former quarry at its western end. Since 1959, Granite Recreation Corporation has occupied the former site of the Granite Development Company Quarry. The entrance driveway off Glyndon Lane has a private grade crossing of the railroad.

== See also ==
- Former counties, cities, and towns of Virginia
