= Polk Miller =

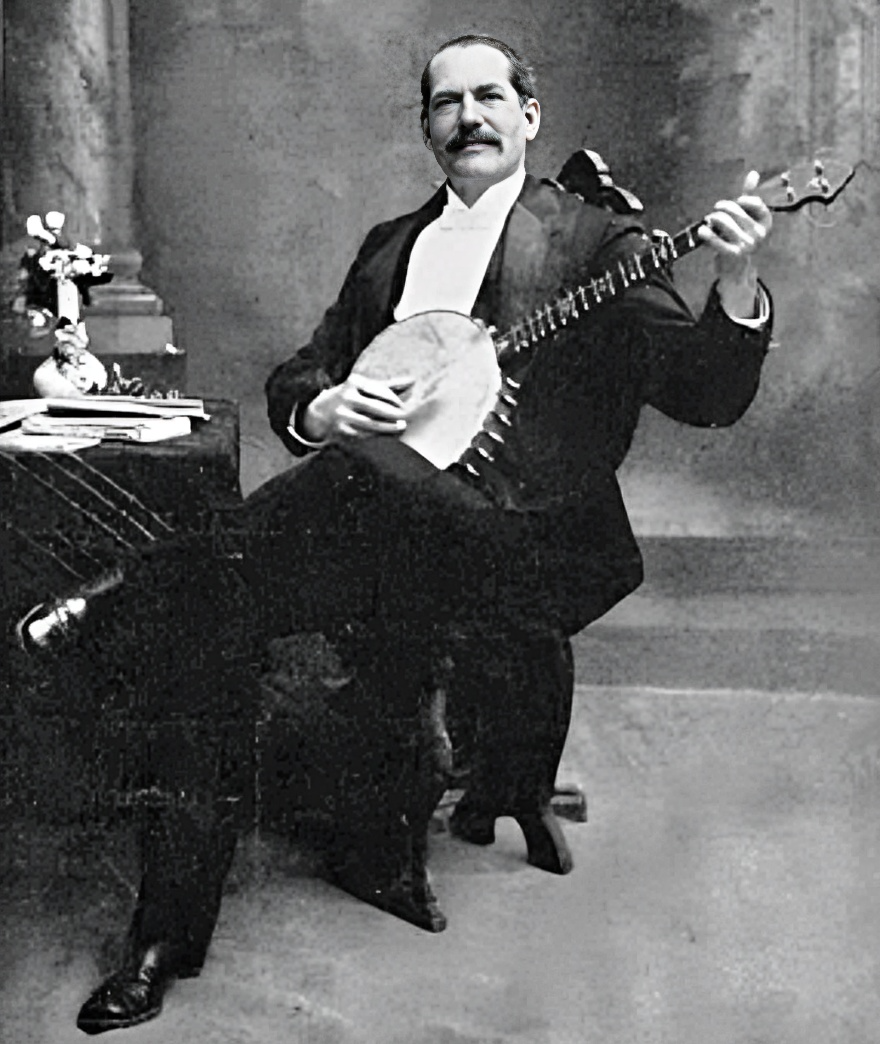

Background information
- Born: August 2, 1844; Prince Edward County, Virginia, United States
- Died: October 20, 1913 (aged 69)
- Occupations: Pharmacist; musician
- Instruments: Banjo; Vocals

Polk Miller (August 2, 1844 – October 20, 1913) was a musician and entertainer from Richmond and Bon Air, Virginia. He was also a pharmacist and the founder of Sergeant's Pet Care Products, Inc.

== Early life ==
Polk Miller was born in Prince Edward County, Virginia, in August 1844. While growing up, he learned to play the banjo from slaves on his father's plantation. He became a druggist in Richmond in 1860. During the American Civil War, he served as a Confederate artilleryman.

At his drugstore in Richmond, Miller began making remedies for Sergeant, his favorite hunting dog. His friends soon found that these remedies worked for their dogs as well. In 1868, began selling the products in the drugstore. This was the beginning of Sergeant's Pet Care Products, Inc. The tradename was established in 1886. By 2007, over 400 pet care products were sold under the Sergeant's trade name. Sergeant's remained an independent company until it was acquired by Perrigo in 2012.

== Musician ==
In 1892, he began performing music professionally. Through the 1890s he had a solo act in which he played banjo, sang songs and told stories. Already comfortably well-off from his drugstore business, Polk Miller had little need to earn money from such appearances, using them to raise funds for church repairs, Confederate monuments and Confederate veterans, while broadcasting his apologist views. In his own words: "As an entertainer, it has been my aim to vindicate the slave-holding class against the charge of cruelty and inhumanity to the negro of the old time."

Polk Miller and his "Old South Quartette" had a variety show of "Stories, Sketches and Songs" depicting African American life before the Civil War. Miller was white, and the four members of the quartet were black. Until recently, only two of the 20 or so black singers that sang in the quartet were widely known: James L. Stamper and Randall Graves. However, further research has identified the names of five others: Anderson Epps, first or lead tenor; Archie Johnson, baritone; Clarence Smith, second tenor; Alphonso DeWitt, basso; and Walter Lightfoot, baritone. They gained national prominence and toured between 1900 and 1911, stopping out of concern for the dangers of touring a racially integrated group.

At one performance, Mark Twain introduced Polk Miller at Madison Square Garden. He was known to perform in blackface and sometimes billed himself as "The Old Virginia Plantation Negro" performing spirituals and pop and folk tunes such as James A. Bland's "Carry Me Back to Old Virginny". Miller and his quartet played colleges and military schools, as well as the "most exclusive social clubs" in New York, Boston, Baltimore, Washington, Pittsburgh, and Cleveland. Polk Miller and the Old South Quartette also performed at African American churches.

Polk Miller's and the Old South Quartette were featured on some of Thomas Edison's earlier phonograph recordings.

In 2008, Tompkins Square issued seven 1909 Edison cylinder records and seven 1928 QRS/Broadway disc recordings in the compilation Polk Miller & His Old South Quartette.

== Death, legacy ==
Polk Miller died on October 20, 1913. He was buried in Richmond's Hollywood Cemetery.

Polk Miller's scrapbook is now in the archives of the Valentine Museum at Richmond. It is notable in that it recorded the problems with racial discrimination the five faced in both the northern and southern portions of the United States as the group traveled and toured.

A few miles west of Richmond, Bon Air was founded by principals of the Richmond and Danville Railroad as a Victorian resort. Polk Street there was named in honor of Polk Miller. Bon Air Elementary was the inspiration for a series of children's books about the kids of the Polk Street School, by Patricia Reilly Giff.

Miller's recorded renditions of the traditional gospel song "Old-Time Religion", the Confederate marching song "The Bonnie Blue Flag", and the song "Watermelon Party" are featured in the 2013 video game BioShock Infinite.
