= Edward Meeks Gregory =

Edward Meeks "Pope" Gregory (September 30, 1922 – January 25, 1995) was an Episcopal priest in Richmond, Virginia. He held the first gay marriage ceremony in Virginia at St. Peter's Church in Richmond in August 1978.

== Biography ==
Edward Meeks Gregory was born the fifth of seven children of Constance Adela (née Heath) Gregory (1890–1982) and George Craghead Gregory (1887–1956) at "Granite Hall", the family estate in northwestern Chesterfield County, Virginia, on September 30, 1922. His father was a prominent attorney, businessman and historian.

He became an Episcopal priest in Richmond, Virginia. He served Episcopal High School in Alexandria, Virginia; Christchurch School in Christchurch, Virginia; St. Mark's Episcopal Church in Richmond, Virginia; and lastly, St. Peter's Episcopal Church also in Richmond. During the era of Massive Resistance and the desegregation crisis post-Brown v. Board of Education in Virginia, when Prince Edward County’s public schools were closed, Gregory raised money for black students to attend private schools from 1959 to 1964. He conducted the first gay marriage ceremony in Virginia at St. Peter's Church in Richmond in August 1978. In 1979, while serving on Richmond'’s Human Relations Commission, Gregory became a big proponent, albeit unsuccessfully, of adding sexual orientation to the city code's nondiscrimination policies. He served as president of the Richmond-Petersburg Council on Human Relations and the Richmond Area Council on Human Relations. Gregory also helped found the Daily Planet, which services the needs of the homeless, and was the clerical advisor and member of the Richmond branch of Dignity/Integrity, the lesbian, gay, transgender, and bisexual caucuses of the Roman Catholic and Episcopal Church in the United States.

He died in 1995. His tombstone in Richmond’s Hollywood Cemetery bears the Latin inscription Pontificeamus (“Let us build bridges.”).

The annual Edward Meeks Gregory Service Award at Christchurch School is given to a worthy student each year. On January 22, 2007, a stained glass window honoring the Rev. Edward Meeks "Pope" Gregory was dedicated in the Chapel of Richmond Hill, an ecumenical Christian fellowship and residential community in a former monastery in Richmond, Va. The Reverend Edward Meeks Gregory Papers are open for research at James Branch Cabell Library of Virginia Commonwealth University.
