= Barksdale Theatre =

Coordinates: 37°34′56″N 77°29′53.2″W

Barksdale Theatre

Barksdale Theatre merged with Theatre IV in 2012 to become Virginia Repertory Theatre.

Barksdale Theatre in Richmond, Virginia, United States, is Central Virginia’s first nonprofit professional performing arts organization, founded in 1953 at the historic Hanover Tavern by Tom Carlin, Stewart Falconer, David 'Pete' Kilgore, Priscilla Kilgore, Muriel McAuley and Pat Sharp. Before the merger, Barksdale presented season at two home locations: Barksdale Theatre at Hanover Tavern and Barksdale Theatre at The Shops at Willow Lawn. Barksdale is recognized as Central Virginia's leading professional theatre. It continues on as Virginia Repertory Theatre's Barksdale Season at Hanover Tavern under the leadership of Artistic Directors Rick Hammerly, Todd D. Norris, and Desiree Roots.

== History ==
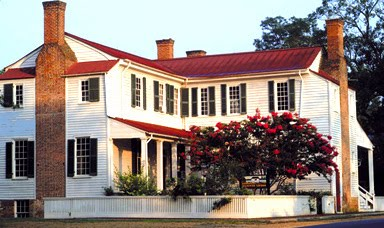
The historic Hanover Tavern

On August 1, 1953, six actors, two children, a dog and two pigs moved into a historic ruin called Hanover Tavern. The transplanted New Yorkers founded Central Virginia’s first professional theatre, and named the company in memory of a deceased college friend, Barbara Barksdale. When they learned that their new neighbors looked forward to eating on evenings out, they combined favorite recipes and created the nation’s first dinner theater. They lived upstairs, performed downstairs, and served hearty meals in the historic rooms that fell in between.

During the first six years, four of the original founders moved on, leaving Pete Kilgore, Muriel McAuley and newcomer (and newly-wed) Nancy Kilgore firmly in charge. In the seasons that followed, Pete, Muriel and Nancy produced Greater Richmond’s first professional productions of plays by Tennessee Williams, Arthur Miller, Eugene O’Neill, George Bernard Shaw, Noël Coward, Thornton Wilder, William Inge and Edward Albee.

They also became dynamic civic leaders. In defiance of Jim Crow laws., Barksdale was Virginia’s first performing arts organization to open its doors to integrated audiences. Barksdale launched Greater Richmond’s first “studio season,” converting an old country store into an experimental theatre. Barksdale conducted Virginia’s first professional theatre classes for children. In 1973, Barksdale produced Virginia’s first professional play based on African American experience, Lorraine Hansberry’s To Be Young, Gifted and Black.

In support of their theatrical mission, Pete, Muriel and Nancy continued the endless task of restoring the Tavern. In 1990, the Tavern was sold to the Hanover Tavern Foundation. In 1993, Pete, Muriel and Nancy retired after 40 years of exemplary service. John Glenn was named Artistic Director. In 1996, to accommodate a full restoration of its beloved home, Barksdale left the Tavern for new facilities at Willow Lawn. In 1997, John Glenn left to pursue other opportunities, and Randy Strawderman was hired to replace him.

In 2001, leadership was transferred to Bruce Miller and Phil Whiteway, Artistic Director and Managing Director, respectively. Under their leadership, the company’s reputation for artistic excellence continued to grow. Subscriptions increased by 700%, and after a ten-year separation, Barksdale returned theatrical programming to Hanover Tavern in January 2006, initiating a four-play Country Playhouse Season designed to complement its five-play Signature Season at Willow Lawn.

Bruce and Phil had also held the positions of Founding Artistic Director and Founding Managing Director at Theatre IV since 1975. After the leadership of Barksdale was transferred to them in 2001, Barksdale Theatre and Theatre IV shared a common staff.

In 2012, Barksdale Theatre and Theatre IV merged to become Virginia Repertory Theatre.

== Past productions ==
For the full list of Barksdale Theatre productions from 1953 to the most recent post-merger seasons as Virginia Repertory Theatre's Barksdale Season at Hanover Tavern, see Virginia Repertory Theatre: Past Productions

The seasons leading up to the merger of Barksdale and Theatre IV included the following:

2011–2012 Signature Season
Presented at Willow Lawn and the Empire Theatre (now known as the November Theatre)
Lend Me a Tenor, by Ken Ludwig (September 9 - October 16, 2011)
My Fair Lady, music by Frederick Loewe, lyrics & book by Alan Jay Lerner (November 25, 2011 - January 8, 2012) - presented at the historic Empire Theatre in celebration of its 100th Anniversary
God of Carnage, by Yasmina Reza, translated by Christopher Hampton (February 3 - March 11, 2012)
Scorched Earth, by David Robbins, WORLD PREMIERE (April 13 - May 20, 2012)
Spring Awakening, book & lyrics by Steven Sater, music by Duncan Sheik (June 15 - July 22, 2012) - presented at the Empire Theatre

2011–2012 Hanover Tavern Season
Becky's New Car, by Steven Dietz (September 23 - November 6, 2011)
Blue Ridge Mountain Christmas, by Bruce Craig Miller, musical arrangements by H. Drew Perkins, WORLD PREMIERE (November 25, 2011 - January 8, 2012)
Always...Patsy Cline, written and originally directed by Ted Swindley, based on a true story (January 20 - March 25, 2012)
Relatively Speaking, by Alan Ayckbourn (July 13 - August 12, 2012)

2010–2011 Signature Season

Shipwrecked!, by Donald Margulies (September 17 - October 24, 2010)
White Christmas, music and lyrics by Irving Berlin, book by David Ives and Paul Blake (November 19 - January 9, 2011) - presented at the Empire Theatre
Legacy of Light, by Karen Zacarias (February 4 - March 13, 2011)
Circle Mirror Transformation, by Annie Baker (April 15 - May 22, 2011)
Dirty Rotten Scoundrels, music & lyrics by David Yazbek, book by Jeffrey Lane (June 17 - August 7, 2011) - presented at the Empire Theatre

2009–2010 Signature Season

Boleros for the Disenchanted, by José Rivera (September 18 – October 25, 2009)
The 25th Annual Putnam County Spelling Bee, by Rachel Sheinkin and William Finn (November 20 – January 17, 2010)
The Grapes of Wrath, by Frank Galati (February 12 – March 21, 2010)
Is He Dead?, by Mark Twain (April 16 – May 23, 2010)
The Sound of Music, music by Richard Rodgers, lyrics by Oscar Hammerstein II and a book by Howard Lindsay and Russel Crouse (June 4 – July 4, 2010) - presented at the Empire Theatre

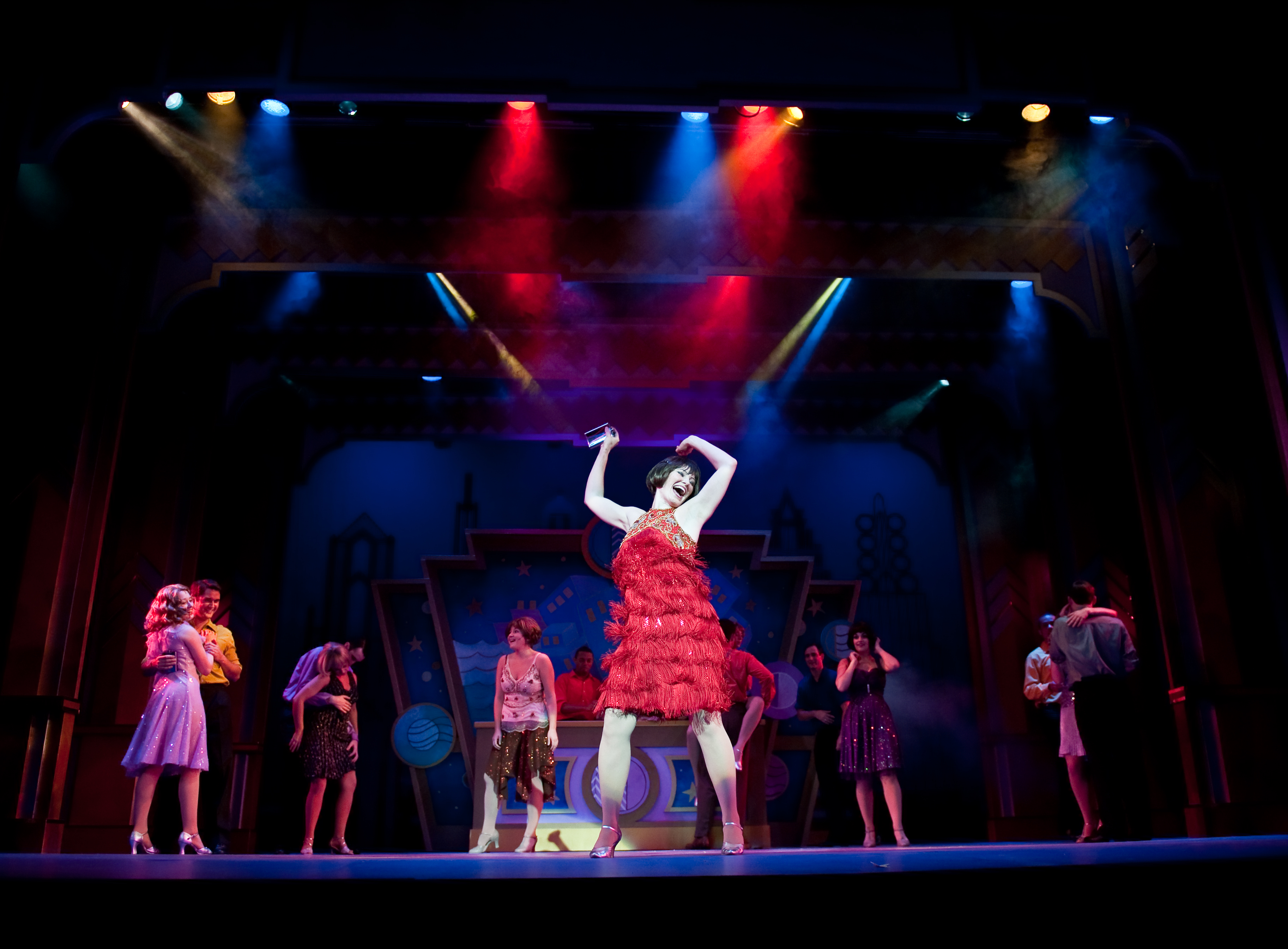
Thoroughly Modern Millie, Summer 2009

2008–2009 Signature Season

The Clean House, by Sarah Ruhl (September 26 – November 2, 2008)
The Wonderful Life, by Steve Murray, conceived by Mark Setlock (November 28 – January 11, 2009)
Children of a Lesser God, by Mark Medoff (February 6 – March 22, 2009)
Well, by Lisa Kron (April 17 – May 24, 2009)
Thoroughly Modern Millie, book by Richard Henry Morris, music by Jeanine Tesori, new lyrics by Dick Scanlan (June 19 – August 2, 2009) - presented at the Empire Theatre

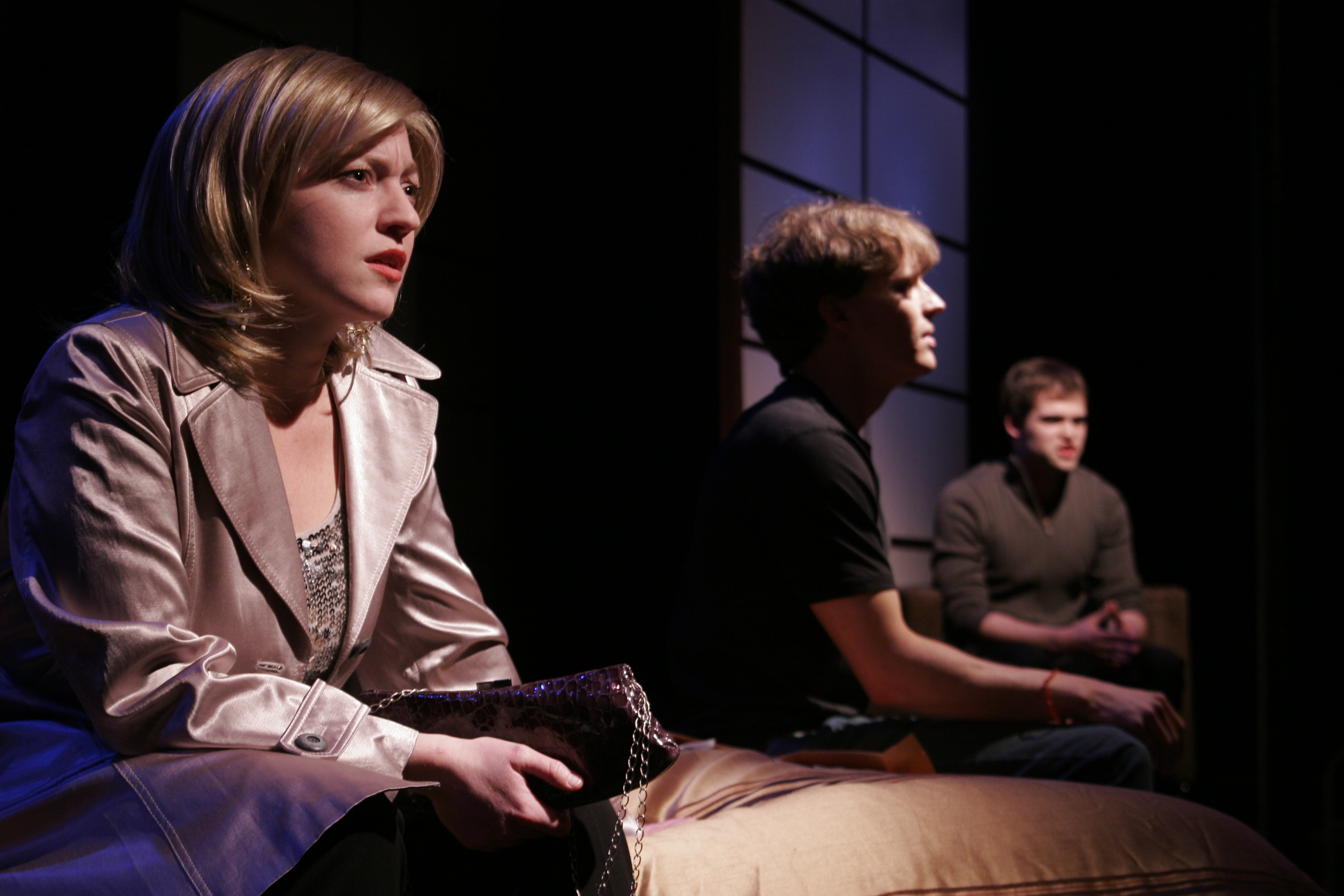
The Little Dog Laughed, Spring 2008

2007–2008 Signature Season

The Member of the Wedding, by Carson McCullers (September 21 – October 28, 2007)
Moonlight and Magnolias, by Ron Hutchinson (November 23 – January 20, 2008)
Doubt, by John Patrick Shanley (February 15 – March 16, 2008)
The Little Dog Laughed, by Douglas Carter Beane (April 11 – May 18, 2008)
Guys and Dolls, by Frank Loesser (June 13 – August 17, 2008) - presented at the Empire Theatre

2006–2007 Signature Season

The Constant Wife, by Somerset Maugham (September 22 – October 29, 2006)
Mame, book by Jerome Lawrence and Robert E. Lee, music and lyrics by Jerry Herman (November 17 – January 28, 2007)
Brooklyn Boy, by Donald Margulies (February 16 – March 25, 2007)
Intimate Apparel, by Lynn Nottage (April 13 – May 20, 2007)
Into the Woods, book by James Lapine, music and lyrics by Stephen Sondheim (June 15 – August 12, 2007)

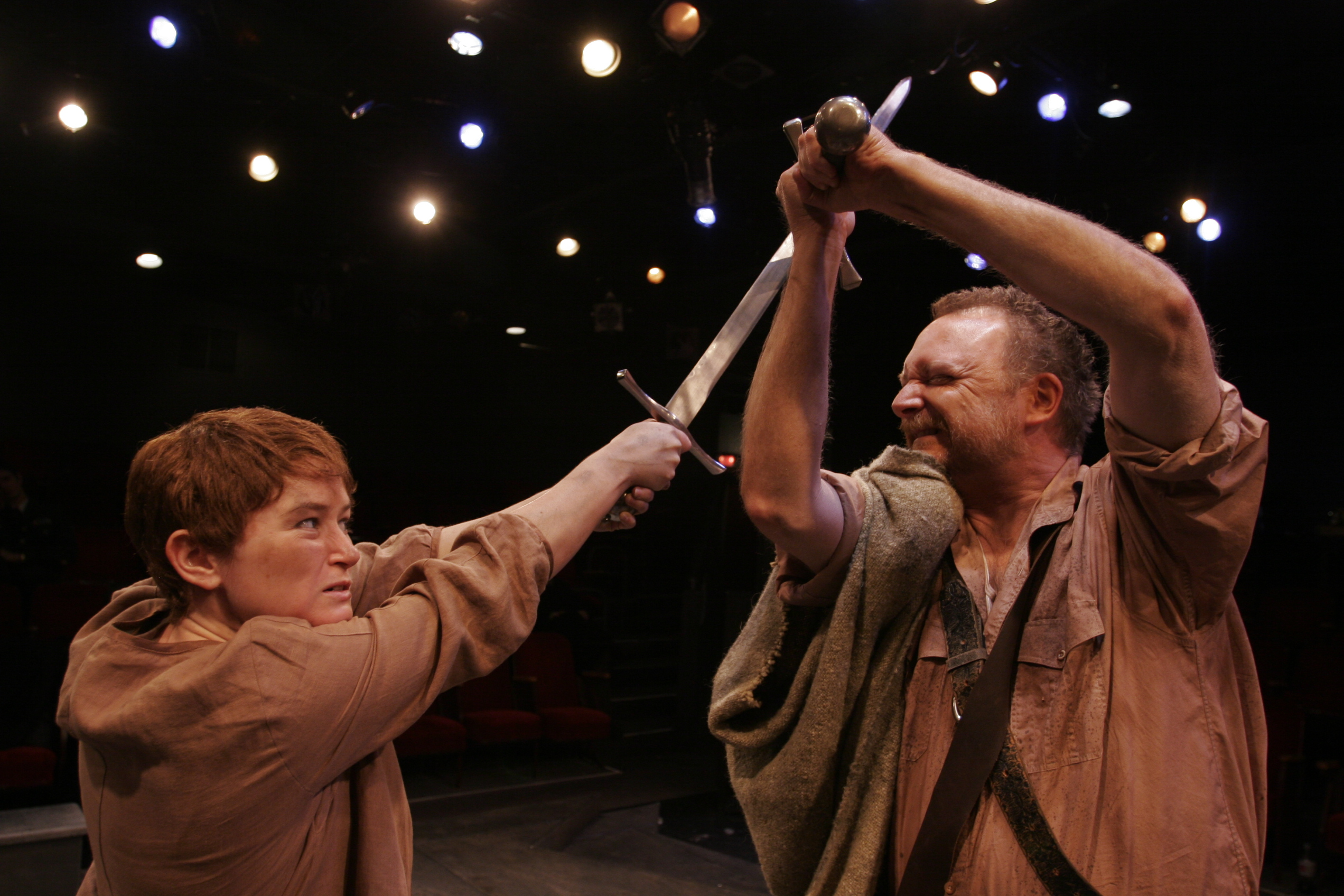
The Lark, Spring 2006

2005–2006 Signature Season

The Drawer Boy, by Michael Healey (September 23 – November 6, 2005)
Scapino!, adapted by Frank Dunlop and Jim Dale (November 25 - January 22, 2006)
The Lark, by Jean Anouilh, adapted by Lillian Hellman (February 10 – April 2, 2006)
The Syringa Tree, by Pamela Gein (April 21 – Mary 21, 2006)
The Full Monty, book by Terrence McNally, music and lyrics by David Yazbek (June 9 – August 13, 2006)

Since the Hanover Tavern re-opened in 2006, Barksdale has also offered a series of shows presented at the Hanover Tavern, in addition to its Signature Season. These seasons include:

2011 Hanover Season

A Thousand Clowns by Herb Gardner
Boeing, Boing, by Marc Camoletti, translated by Beverley Cross
Becky's New Car, by Steven Dietz
Blue Ridge Mountain Christmas, (world premiere) by Bruce Craig Miller, musical arrangements by H. Drew Perkins

2010 Hanover Season

First Baptist of Ivy Gap by Ron Osborne
Butterflies Are Free, by Leonard Gershe
On Golden Pond, by Ernest Thompson
Smoke on the Mountain Homecoming, by Connie Ray, conceived by Alan Bailey, musical arrangements by Mike Craver
Nunsense, book, music and lyrics Dan Goggin

2009 Hanover Season

Mona’s Arrangements (world premiere), book by Bo Wilson, music by Steve Liebman, lyrics by Steve Liebman and Bo Wilson (February 27 – April 19, 2009)
I Ought To Be In Pictures, by Neil Simon (May 15 – June 28, 2009)
Fully Committed, by Becky Mode (July 24 – August 30, 2009)
Souvenir, by Stephen Temperley (September 25 – November 1, 2009)
Bus Stop, by William Inge (November 27 – January 10, 2010)

2008 Hanover Season

Greater Tuna, by Jaston Williams, Joe Sears, and Ed Howard (March 28 – June 15, 2008)
Shirley Valentine, by Willy Russell (July 11 – August 24, 2008)
Driving Miss Daisy, by Alfred Uhry (September 19 – October 26, 2008)
Sanders Family Christmas, book by Connie Ray, conceived by Alan Bailey, musical Arrangements by John Foley and Gary Fagin (November 21 – March 1, 2009)

2007 Hanover Season

Smoke on the Mountain, by Connie Ray (February 23 – April 25, 2007)
The Odd Couple, by Neil Simon (June 29 – August 12, 2007)
Deathtrap, by Ira Levin (September 14 – October 21, 2007)
Swingtime Canteen, by Linda Thorsen Bond, William Repicci and Charles Busch (November 16 – January 6, 2008)

2006 Hanover Season

Barefoot in the Park, by Neil Simon (January 27 - March 12, 2006)
No Sex Please, We're British, by Anthony Marriott and Alistair Foot (April 28 - June 18, 2006)
The Mousetrap, by Agatha Christie (September 8 - October 29, 2006)
Over the River and Through the Woods, by Joe DiPietro (November 16, 2006 - January 7, 2007)
