= Bruce Granville Miller =

Canadian academic

Bruce Granville Miller is a Canadian academic. He currently serves as a Professor of Sociocultural Anthropology and was Graduate Program Chair of the Anthropology Graduate Studies Committee (AGSC) in the Department of Anthropology at the University of British Columbia.

He received his PhD from Arizona State University in 1989. His research concerns Indigenous peoples and their relations with the state in its various local, national, and international manifestations. In recent years, his work has particularly overlapped with scholars in archaeology and in law.

Miller became a fellow of the Canadian Anthropology Society (CASCA) in 2017 and received the Weaver-Tremblay Award for Applied Anthropology in 2020.
