= Virginia Repertory Theatre =

Professional theatre company in Richmond, Virginia

The November Theatre and Theatre Gym at Virginia Rep Center
- Strand Theatre, Booker T., Empire Theatre and Little Theatre
- Address: 114 West Broad Street; Richmond, Virginia; United States
- Owner: Virginia Repertory Theatre
- Capacity: November Theatre: 608; Theatre Gym: 80
- Current use: Flagship performance space for Virginia Repertory Theatre

Construction
- Opened: Dec. 25, 1911
- Architects: Scarborough & Howell

Website
- http://www.va-rep.org/
- The November Theatre and Theatre Gym
- U.S. Historic district – Contributing property
- Part of: Broad Street Commercial Historic District (Richmond, Virginia) (ID87000611)
- Designated CP: April 09, 1987

Virginia Repertory Theatre is a professional theatre company based in Richmond, Virginia. It was created in 2012 when Barksdale Theatre and Theatre IV, which had shared one staff for over a decade, merged to become one company. With an annual budget of over $5 million, the theatre employs over 240 artists annually and presents seasons at the November Theatre (formerly the Empire Theatre) which includes a Theatre Gym, the Virginia Rep Center for Arts and Education, as well as productions at the Hanover Tavern. It is currently run under the co-leadership of Artistic Director Rick Hammerly and Managing Director Klaus Peter Schuller.

In 2012, Sara Belle and Neil November made a $2 million gift for restoration, and the Empire Theatre was renamed the Sara Belle and Neil November Theatre.

== History ==
Virginia Repertory Theatre was created by the merger of Barksdale Theatre and Theatre IV in July 2012 to form one of the largest performing arts organizations in Central Virginia.

=== Barksdale Theatre's history ===
On August 1, 1953, six actors founded Central Virginia's first professional theatre, and named the company in memory of a deceased college friend, Barbara Barksdale.

Barksdale was Virginia's first performing arts organization to open its doors to integrated audiences. In 1973, Barksdale produced Virginia's first professional play based on African American experience, Lorraine Hansberry's To Be Young, Gifted and Black.

In 1990, the Tavern was sold to the Hanover Tavern Foundation.

Barksdale Theatre and Theatre IV began sharing a single staff in 2001, but operated as two separate nonprofit theatres. After a ten-year separation, Barksdale returned theatrical programming to Hanover Tavern in January 2006, renting the space from the Hanover Tavern Foundation to complement its five-play Signature Season at Willow Lawn.

=== Theatre IV's history ===
Theatre IV was founded in 1975 as Virginia's first professional theatre for young audiences. It focused on four areas: the arts, education, children's health and safety, and community leadership.

Over the years Theatre IV produced many educational plays to address social issues. In 1983, in partnership with the Virginia Department of Social Services and Prevent Child Abuse Virginia, Theatre IV created and began touring Hugs and Kisses, Virginia's principal child sexual abuse prevention program. Since that time, Hugs and Kisses has been presented to over 1.5 million children in every school district statewide. Over 15,000 Virginia children have come forward for more information or help after seeing a performance of Hugs and Kisses.

In 1985 Theatre IV produced Do Lord Remember Me based on the oral histories of former slaves interviewed during the Federal Writer's Project, and received the Award of Excellence from Branches of the Arts for "The most outstanding play relating to African-American experience."

In 1986, Theatre IV purchased and renovated the historic November Theatre (formerly the Empire), one of Richmond's two Broadway style houses. This historic theater opened in 1911 for stock and vaudeville performances. In 1915 it changed its name from the Empire to the Strand and continued under that name until damaged by fire in 1927. It reopened in 1933 as the "Booker T," and for many years served as the leading black movie house when Richmond was segregated. It closed in 1974 and was idle until real estate developer Mitchell Kambis rescued and renovated it. Kambis restored the Empire name and in 1979 leased it to Keith Fowler, artistic director of the American Revels Company.

Revels restored live professional theater to downtown Richmond. Revels was succeeded by Theatre IV in 1984. On its 100th anniversary in 2011 the theater was further restored when Sara Belle and Neil November made a $2 million gift to Theatre IV and Barksdale. The November now serves as Virginia Rep's headquarters.

Barksdale returned theatrical programming to Hanover Tavern in January 2006, renting the space from the Hanover Tavern Foundation

In 2002 the Pentagon selected Theatre IV's production of Buffalo Soldier as a morale booster after September 11. Theatre IV became the first professional theatre in the nation to perform within the Pentagon walls.

With a budget of $5 million, four distinct venues, 3 seasons, an educational program, and an annual audience over 80,000, Virginia Rep is the largest professional theatre and one of the largest performing arts organizations in Central Virginia.
