= Williams Island Dam =

Dam in Virginia, US

Coordinates: 37°33′31″N 77°31′35.4″W

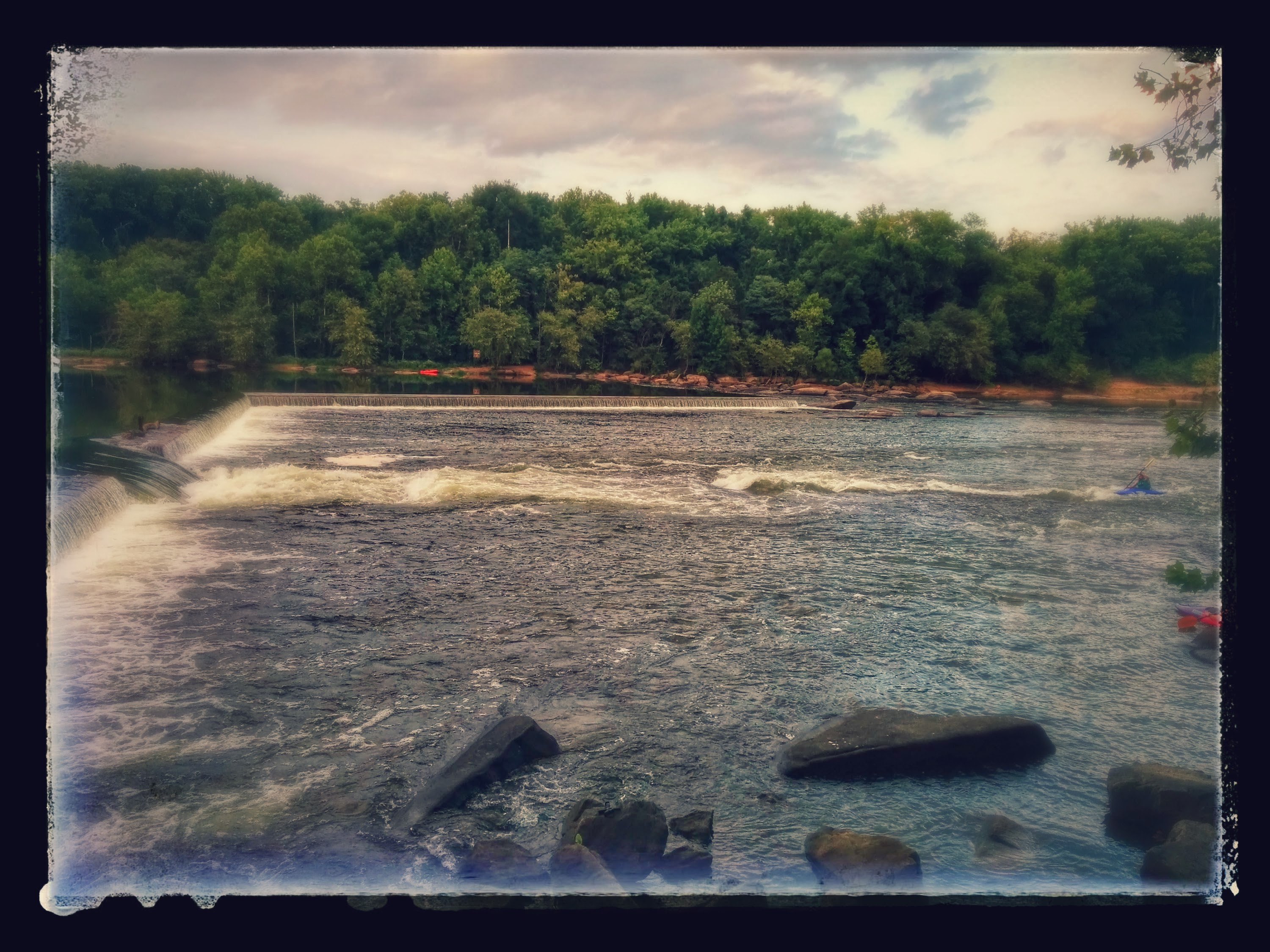
Williams Island Dam pictured in an old photo.

Williams Island Dam is located on the James River in the independent city of Richmond, Virginia. Just below the dam, seven miles (11 km) of rapids mark the descent of the river downstream through the geological Fall Line region to the navigable tidal portion below Richmond, which extends southeast to Hampton Roads.

Williams Island Dam was built in 1905 as part of a drinking water project of the City of Richmond which made use of a portion of the former James River and Kanawha Canal along the north shore of the river west of Richmond. A gravity dam, its height is 7 feet (2.1 m). Its normal storage capacity is estimated to be 50 acre-feet (62,000 m^{3}). It was connected with an early waterworks building which is located on Pumphouse Drive just west of the city's Boulevard Bridge.

Williams Island Dam is wholly located within the city's James River Park System. Williams Island, which separates the two sections of the dam, is a 95-acre (380,000 m^{2}) wildlife preserve and has the nest of a bald eagle. According to the James River Park website, Richmond is the only capital city in the lower 48 states to have an eagle nesting inside the corporate limits.
