= Theatre IV =

For information about the professional theatre company in Richmond, see Virginia Repertory Theatre.

Theatre IV (now Virginia Repertory Theatre) merged with Barksdale Theatre in 2012 to become Virginia Repertory Theatre. In 1975, Theatre IV was founded by Bruce Miller and Phil Whiteway, becoming the state's first professional theatre for young audiences. It began as a touring company, performing around the nation at elementary schools and recreation centers and became the second largest children's theatre in the nation and the largest in-school touring theatre company in the nation.

== Programs and initiatives ==
- 1975 Theatre IV was founded by Bruce Miller and Phil Whiteway, becoming Virginia's first professional theatre for young audiences.
- 2009 Theatre IV, in partnership with Barksdale Theatre, continues to perform live before nearly 600,000 theatre lovers each year, presenting acclaimed home seasons in Richmond, and touring extensively throughout Virginia, 34 additional states plus the District of Columbia, on an annual budget of $5.3 million.
- 2012 Theatre IV merges with Barksdale Theatre to become Virginia Repertory Theatre.

== Awards ==
- 1978 Theatre IV received the first Sara Spencer Award, presented by the Southeastern Theatre Association in recognition of "the most outstanding contribution to children's theatre in the Southeastern United States."
- 1985 Theatre IV produced Do Lord Remember Me based on the oral histories of former slaves interviewed during the Federal Writers' Project and received the Award of Excellence from Branches of the Arts for "The most outstanding play relating to African-American experience."
- 1988 Theatre IV received the Concern for Kids Award from the Virginia Federation of Women's Clubs, recognizing Theatre IV's "outstanding service to Virginia's children."
- 1990 Managing Director Phil Whiteway received the Outstanding Young Citizen of the Year Award from the Richmond Jaycees for "outstanding contributions to the Richmond community."
- 1991 Theatre IV received the Award of Distinguished Service from Handicaps Unlimited of Virginia, honoring "commitment to the principles of inclusion and service to Virginia's disabled citizens."
- 1993 Theatre IV received the Outstanding Service Award presented by the Central Richmond Association for "exemplary civic leadership in service to downtown Richmond."
- 1993 Bruce Miller received the Commissioner's Award from the U. S. Department of Health and Human Services, presented by Commissioner Donna Shalala, honoring his "outstanding national contribution to the field of child abuse and neglect."
- 1996 Theatre IV received the Together for Children Award presented by Prevent Child Abuse Virginia for "exceptional contributions to the well being of Virginia's children and families."
- 1996 Theatre IV's production of Buffalo Soldier, written and directed by Artistic Director Bruce Miller, was booked into the Kennedy Center. Subsequently, it was voted one of the 12 Best American Plays for Young Audiences by the membership of ASSITEJ USA, the national organization of theatre professionals working in the TYA field.
- 1999 STYLE Weekly selected Bruce Miller and Phil Whiteway as two of the 100 Most Influential Richmonders of the 20th Century.

== Honors and other recognitions ==
- 1988 The nation of Israel adopted Hugs and Kisses as a model program, and Bruce Miller and Phil Whiteway visit Tel Aviv with Governor Gerald Baliles to meet with the Israel Department of Social Services and Israel's leading professional touring theatre for young audiences.
- 1990 Theatre IV's James Madison and the Bill of Rights is the only arts program in the nation to be selected for funding by the U. S. Bicentennial Commission for touring to schools throughout the United States.
- 1995 Theatre IV was selected as the only theatre in the nation to be included in PART of the Solution – Creative Alternatives for Youth, a publication of the U. S. Dept. of Justice, the U. S. Dept. of Health and Human Services, and the National Assembly of State Arts Agencies, showcasing the twelve most proactive youth arts programs in the nation.
- 2006 Theatre IV's The Jamestown Story was one of only two arts programs statewide to be selected for funding by the Jamestown 2007 Commemoration Commission for touring to Virginia's schools.
