= List of crossings of the James River =

This is a list of bridges and other crossings of the James River in the U.S. state of Virginia, from the Chesapeake Bay upstream to its source.

== Crossings ==
Crossing	Carries	Location	Built	Coordinates	Image	Notes
Hampton Roads Bridge-Tunnel	I-64 / US 60	Hampton Roads to Norfolk	1957	36°59′14″N 76°18′20″W		Replaced ferries from Willoughby Spit to Old Point Comfort and Pine Beach to Small Boat Harbor
Monitor-Merrimac Memorial Bridge-Tunnel	I-664	Suffolk, Virginia to Newport News, Virginia	1992	36.940837°N 76.401672°W		
James River Bridge	US 17 / US 258 / SR 32	Isle of Wight County, VA to Newport News, VA	1982	36.9910°N 76.4836°W		
Jamestown Ferry	SR 31	Jamestown		37.183°N 76.8786°W		
Benjamin Harrison Memorial Bridge	SR 106 / SR 156	Hopewell	1966	37°19′08″N 77°13′26″W		Replaced Hopewell Ferry
Ferry	SR 827 (Allied Road) at Bermuda Hundred; SR 608 (Shirley Plantation Road) at Shirley					Abandoned
Woodson Ferry	SR 746 (Enon Church Road) at Meadowville; Varina Road at Varina					Abandoned
Varina-Enon Bridge	I-295	Henricus, just East of	1990	37°22′47″N 77°20′47″W		
Hatcher Island Bridge	Private road	Chester, just North East of		37.385314°N 77.374070°W		Wooden bridge to privately-owned island crosses a side-channel of the James River. The main shipping channel lies to the south in the Aiken Swamp-Dutch Gap Cutoff
Cox's Ferry	SR 615 (Coxendale Road) at Osborne's Landing; Cox's Landing					Abandoned
Vietnam Veterans Memorial Bridge	SR 895	Bensley to northwest of Varina	2002	37°26′31″N 77°25′22″W		
Interstate 95 James River Bridge	I-95	Richmond	1958	37°31′41″N 77°25′45″W		
CSX Bellwood Subdivision James River Bridge	Bellwood Subdivision	Richmond		37°31′53″N 77°25′54″W		
Mayo Bridge	US 360	Richmond	1913	37°31′45″N 77°26′03″W		
Norfolk Southern James River Bridge	Richmond District (Norfolk Southern)	Richmond		37°31′49″N 77°26′11″W		
Manchester Bridge	US 60	Richmond	1972	37°31′54″N 77°26′35″W		
Richmond and Petersburg Railroad Bridge (demolished)	Richmond and Petersburg Railroad	Richmond	1838-1882	37°31′56″N 77°26′37″W		
Atlantic Coast Line Railroad Bridge (demolished)	Atlantic Coast Line Railroad	Richmond	demolished 1969	37°31′56″N 77°26′37″W		
Robert E. Lee Memorial Bridge	US 1 / US 301	Richmond	1934	37°31′48.75″N 77°27′2.19″W		
Boulevard Bridge	SR 161	Richmond	1925	37°31′54″N 77°29′2″W		
CSX A-Line Bridge	North End Subdivision	Richmond	1919	37°32′11″N 77°29′38″W		
Powhite Parkway Bridge	SR 76	Richmond		37°32′21″N 77°29′46″W		
Huguenot Memorial Bridge	SR 147	Henrico	1950	37°33′42″N 77°32′38″W		
Edward E. Willey Bridge	SR 150	Richmond, just west of	1989	37°33′34″N 77°34′17″W		
World War II Veterans Memorial Bridge	SR 288	Henrico County and Powhatan County	2004	37.574630°N 77.680410°W		
State Farm Bridge	SR 616	Powhatan County and Goochland County				
Bridge	US 522	Goochland				
Bridge	SR 45	Cartersville, East of Goochland				
Bridge		Columbia				
BBRR Rail Bridge	Buckingham Branch Railroad	Bremo Bluff and New Canton				
John H. Cocke Memorial Bridge	US 15	Bremo Bluff and New Canton				
Bridge	SR 20	Scottsville				
Hatton Ferry		Scottsville		37.758371°N 78.512305°W		
Bridge	SR 602	Howardsville				
Bridge	SR 56	Wingina				
Bridge	US 60	Bent Creek				
CSX Railroad Bridge	CSX Transportation	Joshua Falls				
N&W Railroad Bridge - abandoned	Norfolk and Western Railway	Lynchburg, East of				
Monacan Bridge	US 29	Lynchburg, East of				
Pedestrian Bridge	Blackwater Creek Nature Trail	Lynchburg				
Carter Glass Memorial Bridge	US 29 Bus. (Lynchburg Expressway)	Lynchburg	1954	37°24′40″N 79°08′01″W		
Pedestrian Bridge	Blackwater Creek Nature Trail	Lynchburg				
John Lynch Memorial Bridge	SR 163	Lynchburg	1918-1987	37°25′09″N 79°08′20″W		
NS Railroad Bridge	Norfolk Southern Railway	Lynchburg				
Private Road Bridge	Georgia-Pacific	Big Island				
Harry Flood Byrd Memorial Bridge	Blue Ridge Parkway	Big Island, West of Monroe		37°33'19.2"N 79°22'02.0"W		
Snowden Bridge	US 501	Snowden				
CSX Railroad Bridge	CSX Transportation	Snowden				
Historic James River Foot Bridge	Appalachian Trail	Snowden				
Bridge	SR 759	Natural Bridge Station				
NS Railroad Bridge	Norfolk Southern Railway	Natural Bridge Station				
Bridge	SR 614	Arcadia				
Bridge	US 11	Buchanan				
Bridge	I-81	Buchanan				
Bridge	SR 630	Springwood				
CSX Railroad Bridge	CSX Transportation	Lyle (1st crossing)		37.577853°N 79.742745°W		
CSX Railroad Bridge	CSX Transportation	Lyle (2nd crossing)		37.580220°N 79.745774°W		
Bridge	James Street	Eagle Rock				
Bridge	US 220	Eagle Rock				
CSX Railroad Bridge	CSX Transportation	Baldwin				
Bridge	Bridge Street	Glen Wilton				
Bridge	US 220	Iron Gate, South of		37.776621°N 79.778740°W		
Head at confluence of Jackson and Cowpasture rivers	No crossing	Iron Gate, East of		37.784534°N 79.775842°W		
