= Reusens Dam =

- Location within Virginia
- Location: Amherst County, Virginia, U.S.
- Coordinates: 37°27′47.68″N 79°11′10.44″W
- Purpose: Power
- Status: In use
- Opening date: 1903
- Owner: Eagle Creek Renewable Energy
- Operator: Eagle Creek Renewable Energy

Dam and spillways
- Type of dam: Concrete gravity and concrete arch
- Impounds: James River
- Height: 24 ft (7.3 m)
- Length: 416 ft (127 m)

Power Station
- Operator: Eagle Creek Renewable Energy
- Turbines: 5
- Installed capacity: 12.5 MW

The Reusens Dam is a 12.5 MW hydroelectric generation facility on the James River near the city of Lynchburg, Virginia, United States. The project includes a concrete gravity dam spanning the left side of river which incorporates eight 16 3/4-foot-high flood gates, a 125 feet long by 25 feet tall concrete arch dam segment with 7 1/4-foot-high flashboards, and two separate power houses towards the right bank which contain hydroelectric generation equipment. The A and B power houses have installed capacities of 7.5 MW with three turbines and 5.0 MW with two turbines, respectively. The plant is used in a peaking capacity. The dam is located downstream of the smaller Holcomb Rock Dam and upstream of the Scotts Mill Dam. The typically submerged Bosher Dam near Richmond lies further downstream.

During the year ending September 30, 2014, the project did not produce any electricity.
