= Big Island Dam =

- Location within Virginia
- Location: Bedford County, Virginia / Amherst County, Virginia, U.S.
- Coordinates: 37°32′10.39″N 79°21′24.71″W
- Purpose: Hydroelectric
- Status: In use
- Opening date: 1850
- Owners: GP Big Island, LLC (Georgia Pacific Corporation)
- Operators: GP Big Island, LLC (Georgia Pacific Corporation)

Dam and spillways
- Type of dam: Gravity
- Impounds: James River
- Height: 15 ft (4.6 m)
- Length: 657 ft (200 m)

Power Station
- Operators: GP Big Island, LLC (Georgia Pacific Corporation)
- Hydraulic head: 18 ft (5.5 m)
- Installed capacity: 480 KW
- FERC Number: P-2902

The Big Island Dam is a hydroelectric generation facility on the James River near the community of Big Island, Virginia. The project includes a gravity dam spanning the left side of river and a power house on the right bank which contain hydroelectric generation equipment. The dam is located adjacent to and integrated with the large Georgia Pacific paper mill at this location.

The dam is located downstream of the nearby Bedford Hydropower Project and is the last in a series of three dams within the span of five miles as the river crosses the Blue Ridge Mountains.
