= Looney Creek (James River tributary) =

Tributary of the James River

Coordinates: 37°31′07″N 79°42′06″W

Looney Creek is a 2.7-mile long (4.345 km) Appalachian Mountain stream and major tributary of the James River located in Botetourt County, Virginia. The historic town of Buchanan sits on the banks of this stream within the James River basin which is part of the larger Chesapeake Bay watershed.

== Watershed and course ==
The mountain stream is formed by the confluence of Mill Creek and Back Creek where the creeks merge to form Looney Creek north of Lithia Rd. and west of Back Creek Ln. The tributary then conjoins the James River where the river skirts the base of Purgatory Mountain at Interstate 81 and along the north-side of the Limestone Campgrounds.

Looney Creek is one of two major tributary creeks of the James River originating in Botetourt County, the other being Catawba Creek. Craig Creek another James River tributary creek passes through Botetourt County but rises in Montgomery County. Cowpasture River and Jackson River, two tributary rivers also flow through Botetourt County, coming together to form the James River.

== History ==
The creek is named after European settler Robert Looney. After settling in Virginia in 1740, he was granted 250 acres of land on the James River and in 1742, was granted Looney Creek, located in what is now known as Botetourt County, Virginia.
