= Catawba Creek =

Sstream in Botetourt County, Virginia, US

Coordinates: 37°36′23″N 79°47′05″W

Physical characteristics
- Length: 44 miles

Catawba Creek is a 44-mile long (70.81 km) mountain stream located in Botetourt County in the U.S. state of Virginia and a significant tributary of the James River. The creek originates in the foothills of the Catawba Mountains, just east of the North Fork Roanoke River. From its headwaters, it meanders through the scenic Catawba Mountain Trail, skirts the base of Cedar Ridge Mountain, and ultimately joins the James River north of Timber Ridge Mountain.

Catawba Creek is one of two major tributary creeks of the James River originating in Botetourt County, the other being Looney Creek. Craig Creek another James River tributary creek passes through Botetourt County but rises in Montgomery County. Cowpasture River and Jackson River, two tributary rivers also flow through Botetourt County, coming together to form the James River. Catawba Creek is primarily sustained by rainfall and underground water sources. Its flow patterns are shaped by several contributing streams, including Burke's Garden Run and Roaring Run. The creek also passes through a dam situated within the Catawba Mountain Wildlife Management Area. Seasonal variations show that water levels tend to rise during the spring and decrease during the fall and winter months. Catawba Creek is also a popular destination for fishing, kayaking and other water-sports.

== History ==
During the colonial era, the creek served as a vital travel corridor for settlers migrating southwestward. The early settlers often encountered conflicts with Native American groups in the region during the 1700s. The origin of the creek's name remains uncertain. Although it is named after the Catawba tribe, the Catawba people historically resided in what is now South Carolina, not Virginia, adding an element of mystery to the creek's nomenclature.
