= Virginia State Route 280 =

State highway in Virginia, United States

State Route 280

Route information
- Maintained by VDOT and city of Harrisonburg
- Length: 5.0 mi (8.0 km)
- Existed: 2011–present

Major junctions
- West end: SR 42 in Harrisonburg
- US 11 in Harrisonburg
- East end: US 33 in Massanetta Springs

Location
- Country: United States
- State: Virginia
- Counties: City of Harrisonburg, Rockingham

Highway system
- Virginia Routes; Interstate; US; Primary; Secondary; Byways; History; HOT lanes
← SR 279	→ SR 281

State Route 280 (SR 280) is a primary state highway in the U.S. state of Virginia. The highway runs 5.0 miles (8.0 km) from SR 42 in Harrisonburg east to U.S. Route 33 (US 33) in Massanetta Springs in central Rockingham County. SR 280 is a four-lane southern bypass of Harrisonburg that connects SR 42 and US 33 with US 11 and SR 253 outside of the city core.

== Route description ==
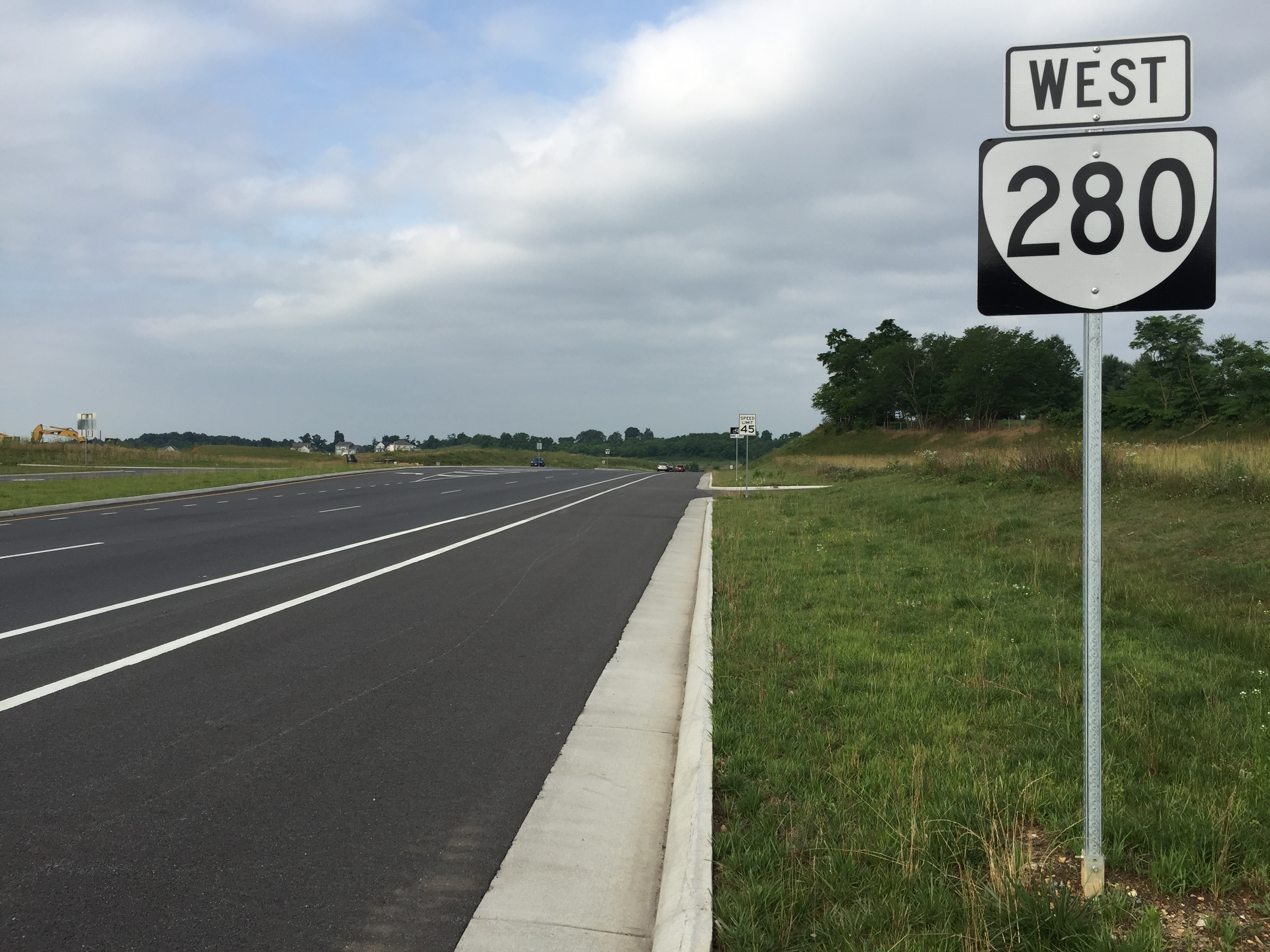
View west from the east end of SR 280 at US 33 in Massanetta Springs

SR 280 begins at a four-legged intersection with SR 42 (High Street) on the western edge of the independent city of Harrisonburg. The west leg of the intersection is unnumbered Erickson Avenue, which is the same name the state highway takes as it heads southeast as a four-lane divided highway. SR 280 intersects the Elkton–Dayton rail line of the Chesapeake Western Railway at grade, curves around a subdivision as an undivided highway, and regains a median before it intersects US 11 (Main Street). The state highway continues southeast as Stone Spring Road, which crosses over Black Run and the Harrisonburg–Pleasant Valley rail line of the Chesapeake Western Railway. SR 280 leaves the city limits of Harrisonburg and enters unincorporated Rockingham County shortly after it crosses over I-81 with no access. The highway curves east before its junction with SR 253 (Port Republic Road). SR 280 continues east through the unincorporated community of Massanetta Springs until it reaches its eastern terminus at US 33 (Spotswood Trail) south of Harrisonburg.

The city of Harrisonburg maintains SR 280 within the city limits. The Virginia Department of Transportation maintains the highway in Rockingham County.

== Major intersections ==
County	Location	mi	km	Destinations	Notes
City of Harrisonburg		0.0	0.0	SR 42 (High Street) / Erickson Avenue west – Dayton, Bridgewater	Western terminus
City of Harrisonburg		1.0	1.6	US 11 (Main Street) – Mount Crawford, Staunton	
Rockingham		3.2	5.1	SR 253 (Port Republic Road) – Harrisonburg, Port Republic	
Rockingham	Massanetta Springs	5.0	8.0	US 33 (Spotswood Trail) – Harrisonburg, Elkton	Eastern terminus
1.000 mi = 1.609 km; 1.000 km = 0.621 mi
