= Virginia State Route 253 =

State highway in Virginia, United States

State Route 253
- Port Republic Road
- Southern Rockingham County and the city of Harrisonburg with SR 253 highlighted in red

Route information
- Maintained by VDOT and City of Harrisonburg
- Length: 12.18 mi (19.60 km)
- Existed: 2005–present

Major junctions
- West end: US 11 in Harrisonburg
- I-81 in Harrisonburg; SR 276 at Cross Keys
- East end: US 340 / SR 659 near Port Republic

Location
- Country: United States
- State: Virginia
- Counties: City of Harrisonburg, Rockingham

Highway system
- Virginia Routes; Interstate; US; Primary; Secondary; Byways; History; HOT lanes
← SR 252	→ SR 254

State Route 253 (SR 253) is a primary state highway in the U.S. state of Virginia. Known as Port Republic Road, the state highway runs 12.18 miles (19.60 km) from U.S. Route 11 (US 11) in Harrisonburg east to US 340 near Port Republic. SR 253 is a northwest–southeast highway that connects Harrisonburg with Cross Keys and Port Republic in southeastern Rockingham County. The state highway also provides access to portions of James Madison University on either side of Interstate 81 (I-81). SR 253 is maintained by the Virginia Department of Transportation except for the portion in the independent city of Harrisonburg, which is municipally maintained.

A small portion of Port Republic Road through Port Republic was included in the state highway system by the late 1920s as part of the highway between Waynesboro and Elkton. This section was paved in the early 1930s and carried three different route numbers until it was transferred to the secondary system in the early 1940s. Port Republic Road was placed on its modern alignment through Port Republic in the mid-1950s, by which time almost all of the highway was paved. SR 659, which was assigned to Port Republic Road from Harrisonburg to near Cross Keys, was extended southeast through Port Republic by the mid-1970s. Port Republic Road was expanded to four lanes within Harrisonburg in the mid-1990s and mid-2000s and along a short stretch south from the city limits in the early 2010s. SR 659 was brought into the primary highway system as SR 253 in 2005.

== Route description ==
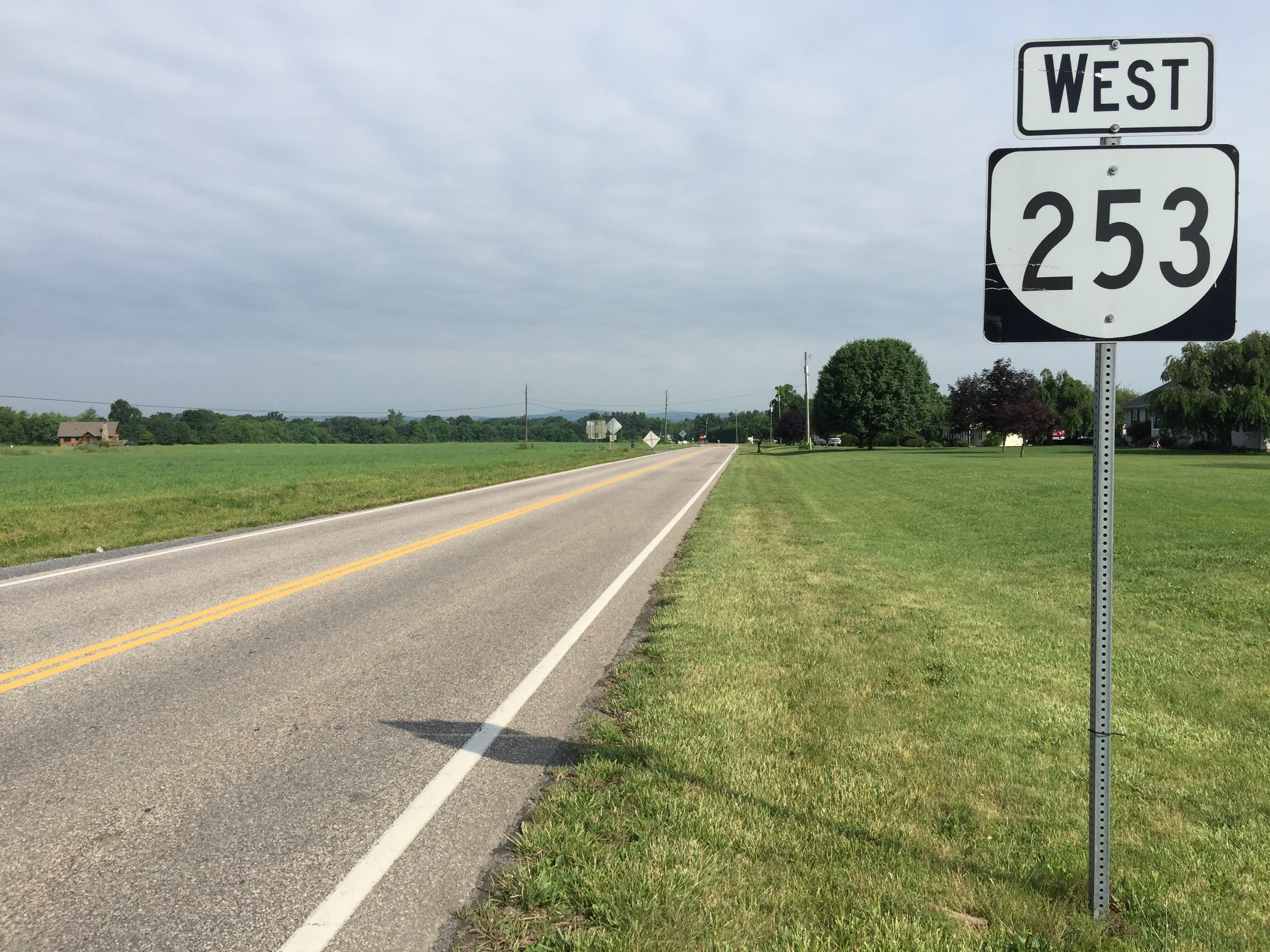
View west from the east end of SR 253 at US 340 near Port Republic

SR 253 begins at an intersection with US 11 (Main Street) south of downtown Harrisonburg and southwest of the campus of James Madison University. The highway heads southeast as a four-lane undivided highway that intersects Bluestone Drive, which heads north to the campus and Bridgeforth Stadium, just before meeting I-81 at a diamond interchange. SR 253's next intersection is with Forest Hill Road, which leads to the James Madison University Convocation Center, the Edith J. Carrier Arboretum, and the rest of the portion of James Madison University east of I-81. The highway gains a center left-turn lane at Devon Lane and passes several university athletic fields at Neff Avenue. SR 253's center left-turn lane ends and the road expands to a four-lane divided highway at the boundary between the independent city of Harrisonburg and Rockingham County. The highway intersects SR 280 (Stone Spring Road) next to Rockingham Memorial Hospital.

South of SR 704 (Boyer Road), SR 253 drops to two lanes and the surroundings transition from suburban to rural. The highway intersects SR 276 (Cross Keys Road) a short distance northeast of the village of Cross Keys and crosses Mill Creek east of the village. SR 253 curves southwest and crosses the North River into the village of Port Republic, then curves back southeast and exits the village by crossing the South River just west of the confluence of the two rivers to form the South Fork Shenandoah River. SR 253 has an intersection with the northern end of SR 825 (South River Road) and a level crossing of Norfolk Southern Railway's Roanoke District before reaching its eastern terminus at US 340 (East Side Highway); Port Republic Road continues as SR 659.

== History ==
The first portion of Port Republic Road to become a part of the state highway system was from Main Street (now SR 605) in Port Republic north to Pineville Road (now SR 672). That highway, SR 809, ran from Greenville through Waynesboro and Grottoes to SR 17 (now US 33) at Montevideo between Harrisonburg and Elkton by 1928. In 1930, the state highway was relocated to the east side of the South River from Grottoes to Port Republic along South River Road (now SR 825). SR 809 was not paved along Port Republic Road until 1932. As of 1932, the remainder of Port Republic Road followed highways maintained by the city of Harrisonburg and Rockingham County. These included county route (CR) 31 from Harrisonburg through the junction with CR 12 (now SR 276) near Cross Keys to Goods Mill Road (now SR 708), on which CR 31 continued. Port Republic Road continued along CR 214 to Battlefield Road (then CR 7, now SR 679). The road continued along CR 7 to the junction with SR 809. CR 31 was paved from Harrisonburg to about the modern city limits of Harrisonburg, and CR 7 was paved from SR 809 to the Battlefield Road split. By July 1933, after the passage of the Byrd Road Act that established Virginia's secondary highway system and transferred maintenance responsibility for local highways from the county to the state, all of Port Republic Road's route numbers changed. SR 807 became part of SR 340, which became SR 12 in 1936. After the East Side Highway, the modern route of US 340, was completed from Grottoes to Elkton in 1941, SR 12 was moved to the new highway by 1944; the old highway became SR 865.

SR 865's modern bridges across the South River and North River and their approaches were constructed in 1955 and 1956. These bridges were upstream from the old bridges. SR 865's bridge across Mill Creek and its approaches were constructed in 1956 and 1957. By 1958, Port Republic Road consisted of SR 659 from Harrisonburg to Goods Mill Road, SR 675 south from there to Battlefield Road, SR 679 from there to SR 865 (Pineville Road), SR 865 through Port Republic, and SR 629 from SR 865 just south of the South River to beyond US 340 (East Side Highway). The county highways were all paved except for SR 675, which was gravel. Port Republic Road's interchange with I-81 was completed when the Interstate was completed between interchanges with US 11 on either side of Harrisonburg in 1961. By 1974, SR 659 was extended southeast so that all of Port Republic Road was one route number. Port Republic Road was relocated at its intersection with SR 680 (Oak Ridge Road) in 1971. The intersection had formerly been a T intersection that required a turn to remain on Port Republic Road. SR 659 was reconstructed from SR 689 (Spaders Church Road) to just south of I-81 by 1978. The highway's intersections with SR 708 and SR 679 were revised and SR 659 was reconstructed between them by 1987.

Port Republic Road was widened by the city of Harrisonburg to four lanes from US 11 to I-81 in 1994, from I-81 to Neff Avenue in 2004, and from Neff Avenue to the city limit by 2006. Port Republic Road in the city of Harrisonburg and SR 659 in Rockingham County from the city to US 340 were transferred from the secondary system to the primary highway system as SR 253 by a resolution passed by the Commonwealth Transportation Board on March 17, 2005. The transfer was supported in part by the planned relocation of Rockingham Memorial Hospital from north of the James Madison University campus in the city to southeast of the city in Rockingham County, a process that began in 2004 and was completed when the hospital opened in 2010. SR 253 was expanded to a four-lane divided highway from SR 704 (Boyers Road) north to the city limit, thus connecting with the four-lane highway built by the city, starting in early 2010. The expansion project was completed in early 2012, although the new divided highway opened to traffic in June 2011. The project included construction of a small piece of SR 280— the Southeast Connector, which connects SR 42, US 11, SR 253, and US 33 south of Harrisonburg—at its intersection with SR 253 next to Rockingham Memorial Hospital.

== Major intersections ==
County	Location	mi	km	Destinations	Notes
City of Harrisonburg		0.00	0.00	US 11 (South Main Street) to Maryland Avenue / SR 42 – Historic Downtown, Eastern Mennonite University	Western terminus
City of Harrisonburg		0.48	0.77	I-81 – Winchester, Staunton	I-81 exit 245
Rockingham		2.40	3.86	SR 280 (Stone Spring Road)	
Rockingham		5.68	9.14	SR 276 (Cross Keys Road) to US 33 – Weyers Cave	
Rockingham		12.18	19.60	US 340 (East Side Highway) / SR 659 (Port Republic Road) – Elkton, Grottoes	Eastern terminus
1.000 mi = 1.609 km; 1.000 km = 0.621 mi
