= Coleman Falls, Virginia =

Unincorporated community in Virginia, United States

- Unincorporated community
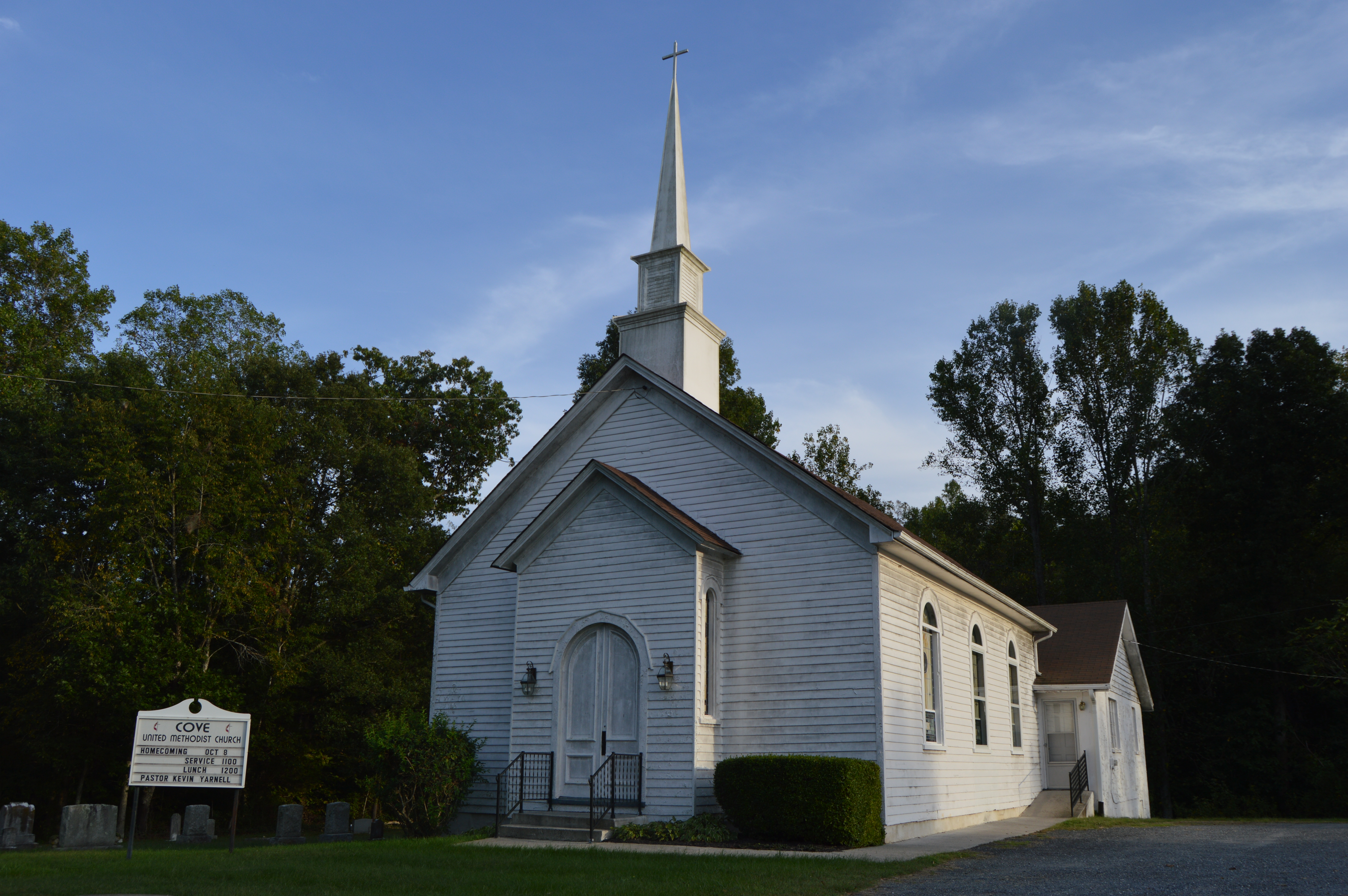
- Cove United Methodist Church

- Location within Virginia Location within the United States
- Coordinates: 37°30′06″N 79°18′13″W
- Country: United States
- State: Virginia
- County: Bedford
- Elevation: 682 ft (208 m)
- Time zone: UTC-5 (Eastern (EST))
  - Summer (DST): UTC-4 (EDT)
- ZIP Code: 24503 (Lynchburg); 24526 (Big Island); 24536 Coleman Falls
- Area code: 434
- GNIS feature ID: 1492790

Coleman Falls is an unincorporated community in northern Bedford County, Virginia, United States. The community is located along the James River and U.S. Route 501, between Big Island and Boonsboro. It is part of the Lynchburg Metropolitan Statistical Area.

== History ==
The community was named after a family from the area in 1923.

== Geography ==
The community is approximately 10.75 miles (17.30 km) northwest of Lynchburg.

== Government ==
The United States Postal Service operates the Coleman Falls Post Office within the community. The post office has the ZIP Code of 24536. Big Island and Lynchburg Zip Codes are used for some properties in the community.

== Education ==
The community is served by Bedford County Public Schools. Public school students residing in Coleman Falls are zoned to attend either Big Island Elementary School, Liberty Middle School, and Liberty High School or Boonsboro Elementary School, Forest Middle School, and Jefferson Forest High School.

The closest higher education institutions are located in Bedford and Lynchburg.

== Infrastructure ==
The Coleman Falls Dam, operated by the Georgia-Pacific Corporation, is located in the community.

Law enforcement is provided by the Bedford County Sheriff's Office. Fire protection is provided by the Big Island Volunteer Fire Company and Boonsboro Volunteer Fire and Rescue Company. Emergency medical services are provided by the Bedford County Department of Fire and Rescue, Big Island Emergency Crew, and Boonsboro Volunteer Fire and Rescue Company.

=== Transportation ===
The Lynchburg Regional Airport is the closest airport with commercial service to the community.

U.S. Route 501 (Lee Jackson Highway) passes through Coleman Falls.

The CSX operated James River Subdivision runs through the community. The closest passenger rail service is located in Lynchburg.
