= Carter Glass Memorial Bridge =

- Coordinates: 37°24′40″N 79°08′01″W
- Carries: US 29 Bus.
- Crosses: James River
- Locale: Lynchburg, Virginia
- Named for: Carter Glass

History
- Constructed by: T. A. Loving Company
- Opened: 1954

Location
- Interactive map of Carter Glass Memorial Bridge

Carter Glass Memorial Bridge crosses the James River between the independent city of Lynchburg and Amherst County, Virginia, Lynchburg Expressway. The bridge carries U.S. Route 29 Business (US 29 Bus.), and it was named in 1949 in honor of former U.S. Senator Carter Glass (1858–1946) of Lynchburg. The bridge was constructed in 1953–1954.

== See also ==
- List of crossings of the James River
