= Virginia State Route 281 =

State highway in Henrico County, Virginia, US

State Route 281
- Airport Drive

Route information
- Maintained by VDOT
- Length: 1.60 mi (2.57 km)
- Existed: 2013–present

Major junctions
- South end: SR 895 near Varina
- North end: Charles City Road / Airport Drive near Richmond Int'l Airport near Sandston

Location
- Country: United States
- State: Virginia
- Counties: Henrico

Highway system
- Virginia Routes; Interstate; US; Primary; Secondary; Byways; History; HOT lanes
← SR 280	→ SR 283

State Route 281 (SR 281) is a primary state highway in the U.S. state of Virginia. Known as Airport Drive, the highway runs 1.60 miles (2.57 km) from SR 895 near Varina north to Charles City Road near Sandston in eastern Henrico County. SR 281 provides access to Richmond International Airport from the south. These connections are made via SR 895 from Interstate 295 (I-295) to the east and I-95 to the west.

== Route description ==
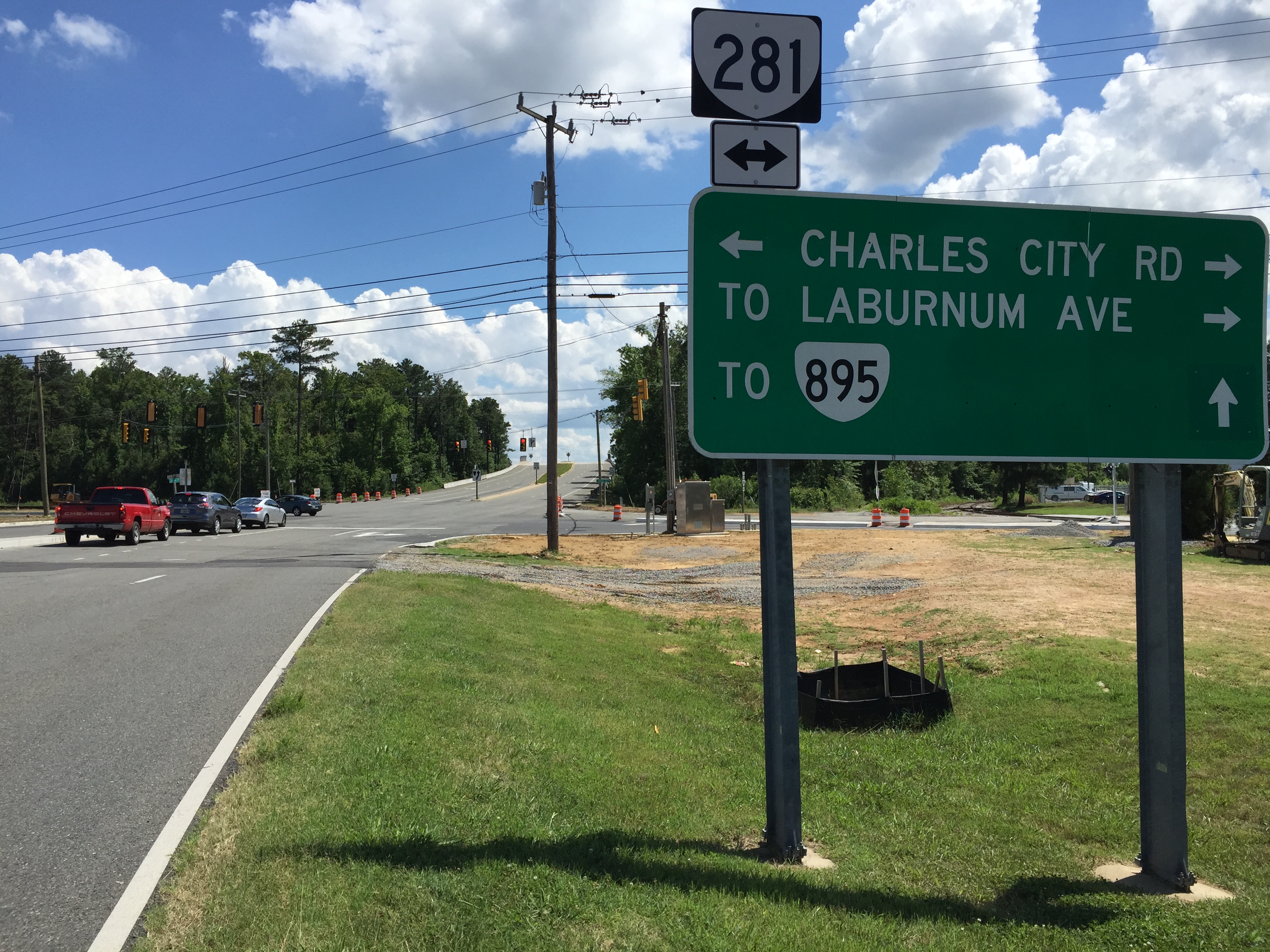
View south along SR 281 in Sandston (sign incorrectly notes SR 281 goes left and right, but it actually continues straight ahead)

SR 281 begins at a trumpet interchange with SR 895 (Pocahontas Parkway) north of Varina. Vehicles to and from SR 895 pay a toll either further west toward I-95 or at one-lane toll plazas on the ramps to and from SR 895 in the direction of I-295. SR 281 heads north as four-lane divided Airport Drive. The highway has one intermediate intersection, with 7 Hills Drive next to an industrial park. SR 281 crosses over Sprouse Drive and CSX's Peninsula Subdivision rail line then reaches its northern terminus at Charles City Road south of Sandston. Airport Drive continues north as an unsigned highway along the west side of Richmond International Airport, providing access to the airport terminal and parking, before intersecting U.S. Route 60 and SR 156, the latter of which retains the name Airport Drive and provides access to I-64.

== Major intersections ==
The entire route is in Henrico County.

Location	mi	km	Destinations	Notes
	0.00	0.00	SR 895 (Pocahontas Parkway) to I-95 / I-295	Southern terminus
	1.60	2.57	Charles City Road / Airport Drive north – Richmond International Airport	Northern terminus
1.000 mi = 1.609 km; 1.000 km = 0.621 mi
