= Robert E. Lee Memorial Bridge =

Bridge across the James River in Richmond, VA, US

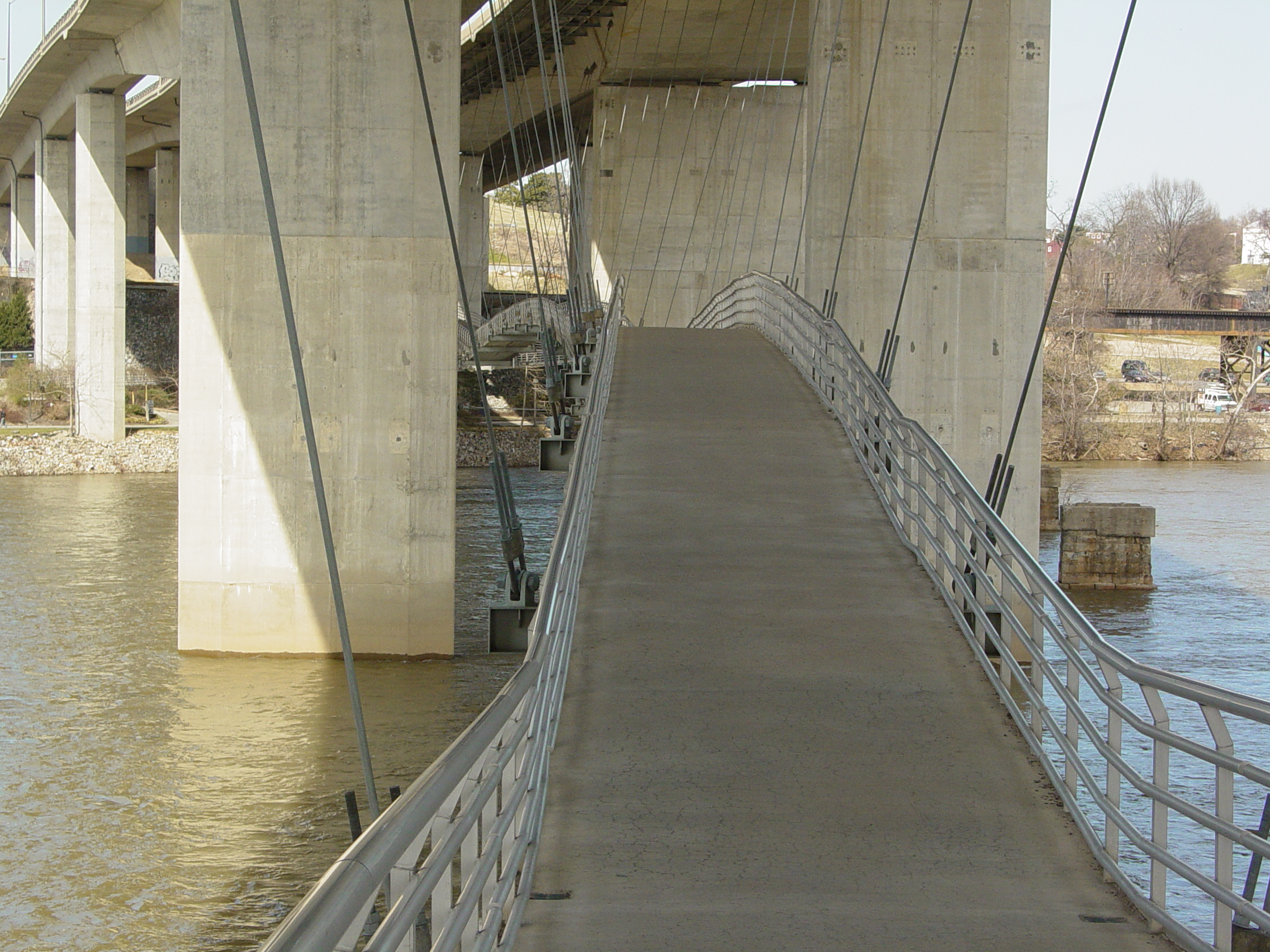
- Robert E. Lee Memorial Bridge viewed from underneath, showing footbridge to Belle Isle.
- Coordinates: 37°31′49″N 77°27′02″W
- Carries: US 1 / US 301
- Crosses: James River
- Locale: Richmond, Virginia
- Official name: Robert E. Lee Memorial Bridge
- Other name: Lee Bridge

Location
- Interactive map of Robert E. Lee Memorial Bridge

The Robert E. Lee Memorial Bridge in Richmond, Virginia carries U.S. Route 1 and U.S. Route 301 across the James River at the Fall Line.

The city acquired the original bridge from Richmond Bridge Corp in 1933, and it was named the James River Bridge but was later renamed for the Confederate general. However, in light of the George Floyd protests in 2020, the Richmond City Council began the process of reverting its name to the James River Bridge. It was originally constructed as a four lane toll facility and opened in 1934. In the 1980s, a replacement structure was built including a substantial realignment of the approach roadways at the south end. Work was completed in 1989. It is toll-free and includes 3 lanes in either direction. An on-ramp and an off-ramp for South 2nd Street connects to the bridge over the north shore of the James River. The Virginia War Memorial is located adjacent to its northern end.

A notable feature is a pedestrian footbridge which hangs below the road deck from Tredegar Street near the site of the Tredegar Iron Works on the north shore over to Belle Isle in the middle of the river.

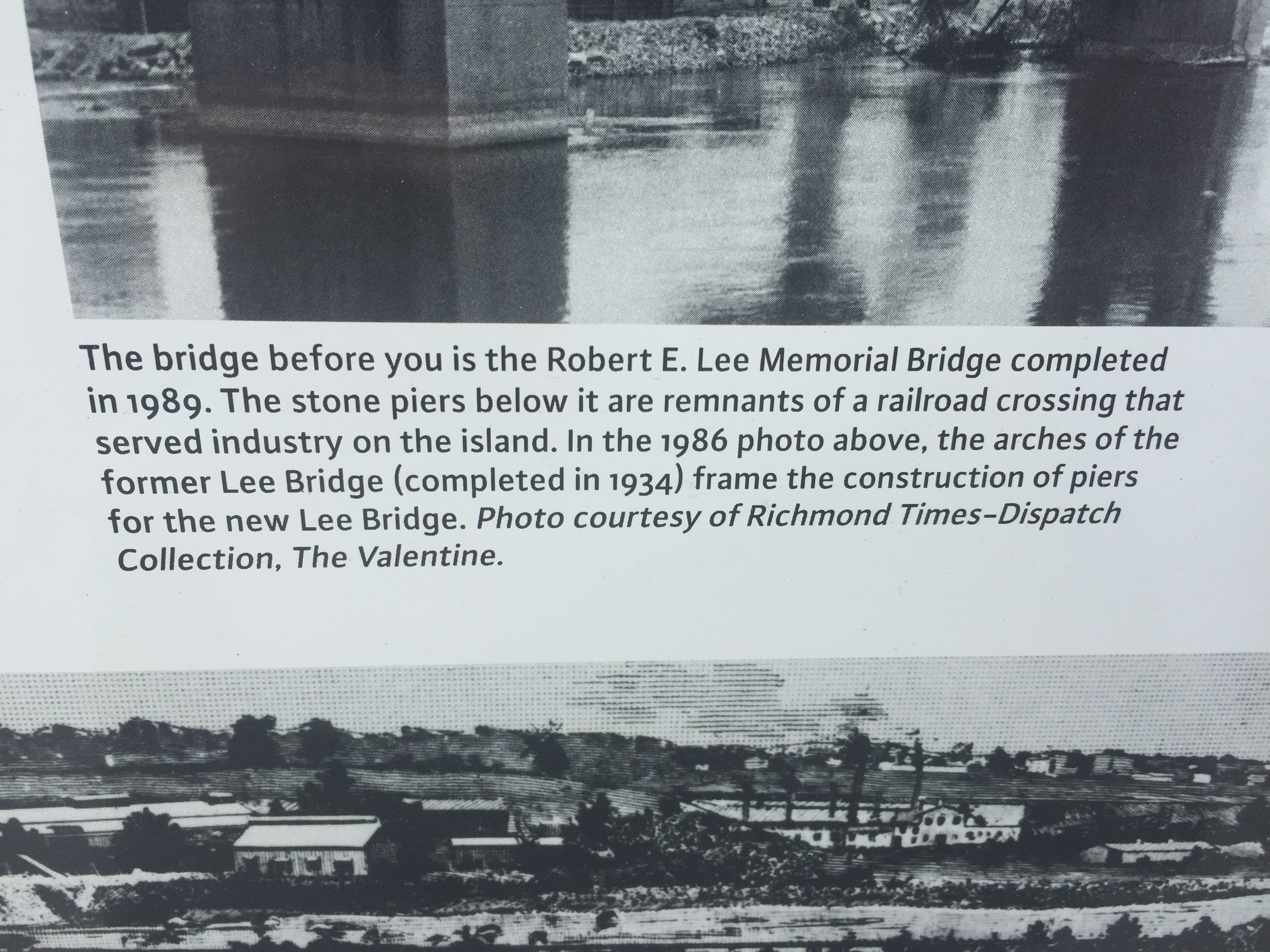
Historical Marker located on the entrance of the bridge

== See also ==
- List of crossings of the James River
