= Bedford Hydropower Project =

- Location within Virginia
- Location: Bedford County, Virginia / Amherst County, Virginia, U.S.
- Coordinates: 37°34′24.85″N 79°22′17.53″W
- Purpose: Hydroelectric, Recreation, Fish and Wildlife Pond
- Status: In use
- Owner: Town of Bedford, Virginia
- Operator: Town of Bedford, Virginia

Dam and spillways
- Type of dam: Concrete gravity
- Impounds: James River
- Height: 19.6 ft (6.0 m)

Power Station
- Operator: Town of Bedford, Virginia
- Turbines: 2
- Installed capacity: 4.5 MW
- Annual generation: 12,284.7 MWH (2018)
- FERC Number: 5596

The Bedford Hydropower Project (Snowden) is a hydroelectric generation facility on the James River near the community of Big Island, Virginia. The project includes a low head structure completely spanning the river; river flow is split into a concrete canal leading to the hydroelectric generation facility and the natural river course.

Dam and hydroelectric plant are located approximately one mile downstream of the larger Cushaw Hydroelectric Project; the address of the project is 7443 Elon Road (Virginia Route 130), Big Island, Virginia. This dam is the middle of three dams in rapid succession; the Big Island Dam is located several miles downstream.

The project consists of a canal along the left bank of the river leading to the buttressed power plant structure and an adjacent run of the river bypass of natural riverbed past the low head dam. A public fishing area is located at the Project upstream of the canal headgates; a canoe portage is also provided.

The project is operated by the Town and is staffed at least two hours per day, seven days a week. Additionally, the plant is monitored remotely and an automated call system alerts town personnel of abnormal conditions.
