= John Lynch Memorial Bridge =

- Coordinates: 37°25′09″N 79°08′20″W
- Carried: Personal and Commercial cars and trucks
- Crossed: James River
- Locale: Madison Heights, Virginia
- Named for: John Lynch
- Preceded by: An old toll bridge built during Civil War Reconstruction
- Followed by: Carter Glass Memorial Bridge

History
- Construction start: 1916
- Construction end: 1918
- Collapsed: 1987
- Closed: 1987
- Replaced: An old roll road

Statistics
- Toll: None

The John Lynch Memorial Bridge crosses the James River as a link between Madison Heights, Virginia (Amherst County) and downtown Lynchburg, Virginia. Prior to the construction of the Carter Glass Memorial Bridge, the John Lynch Memorial Bridge was the only bridge connecting the two areas.
