= Coleman Falls Dam =

- Location within Virginia
- Location: Bedford County, Virginia / Amherst County, Virginia, U.S.
- Coordinates: 37°30′8.55″N 79°17′59.90″W
- Purpose: Hydroelectric, Recreation, Fish and Wildlife Pond
- Status: In use
- Opening date: 1851
- Owner: Georgia Pacific Corporation
- Operator: Georgia Pacific Corporation

Dam and spillways
- Type of dam: Gravity
- Impounds: James River
- Height: 20 ft (6.1 m)
- Length: 562 ft (171 m)

Power Station
- Operator: Georgia Pacific Corporation
- Hydraulic head: 18 ft (5.5 m)

The Coleman Falls Dam is a hydroelectric generation facility on the James River near the community of Coleman Falls, Virginia. The project includes a gravity dam spanning the left side of river and a power house on the right bank which contain hydroelectric generation equipment.

The dam is located upstream of the smaller Holcomb Rock Dam.
