= Scotts Mill Dam =

- Location within Virginia
- Location: Lynchburg, Virginia, U.S.
- Coordinates: 37°25′27.26″N 79°8′29.90″W
- Purpose: Water supply
- Status: In use
- Opening date: 1839
- Owner: Luminaire Technologies
- Operator: Luminaire Technologies

Dam and spillways
- Type of dam: gravity and arch
- Impounds: James River
- Height: 20.5 ft (6.2 m)
- Length: 925 ft (282 m)

The Scotts Mill Dam, also known as the Lynchburg Dam or Scots Mill Dam, is a dam across the James River at the south end of Daniel Island in the city of Lynchburg, Virginia. The project includes a gravity dam spanning the left side of river and a small arch dam portion towards the right bank. The facility is used for water supply, there is no hydroelectric production. The dam is located adjacent to the Griffin Pipe Products mill at this location. The facility once included a canal or lock structure, ruins are still visible on the right bank, for hydropower or river boat transportation; this feature is no longer in use.
