= Cushaw Hydroelectric Project =

- Location within Virginia
- Location: Bedford County, Virginia / Amherst County, Virginia, U.S.
- Coordinates: 37°35′34.25″N 79°22′52.97″W
- Purpose: Hydroelectric, Recreation, Fish and Wildlife Pond
- Status: In use
- Construction began: 1928
- Opening date: 1930
- Owner: Cushaw Hydro LLC
- Operator: Cushaw Hydro LLC

Dam and spillways
- Type of dam: Reinforced concrete gravity
- Impounds: James River
- Height: 27 ft (8.2 m)
- Length: 1,550 ft (470 m)
- Elevation at crest: 656 ft (200 m)
- Spillway type: weir

Power Station
- Operator: Cushaw Hydro LLC
- Turbines: 5
- Installed capacity: 7.5 MW

The Cushaw Hydroelectric Project is a 7.5 megawatt (MW) dam and power house facility owned and operated by Cushaw Hydro LLC.

The project is located on the James River, a navigable waterway of the United States, in Bedford and Amherst Counties, Virginia. The project occupies federal lands administered by the U.S. Forest Service. Nearby communities include Snowden and Big Island, Virginia. The town of Glasgow, Virginia lies just northwest of the Cushaw Project pool.

The project was constructed and began generating electric power in 1930 at the site of a former dam constructed in the 1820s and reconstructed in the 1850s known as Cushaw Falls Dam. The Cushaw Project consists of a 1,550-foot-long, 27-foot-high reinforced concrete dam, with a 1,500-foot-long spillway extending diagonally across the James River. The dam impounds a 138-acre reservoir with a surface elevation of 656 feet mean sea level (msl) at normal operating pool. The project’s powerhouse is integral with the dam and contains five generating units with a total installed capacity of 7,500 kilowatts. Project power is transmitted through a 2.3-kilovolt (kV) underground cable connected to a substation. Dominion Energy previously operated the project remotely from its Bath County Pumped Storage project. Dominion Energy sold the project (the oldest one in their fleet) to Cushaw Hydro LLC in late 2018.

There are no designated recreation areas at the project, but the owner cooperates with the Virginia Department of Game and Inland Fisheries in maintaining a boat ramp known as Rocky Row Run, which is located on the project impoundment approximately 0.8 mile upstream from the Cushaw dam. In addition, the Appalachian National Scenic Trail Foot Bridge, constructed in 2000 on the pilings of a former railroad bridge, crosses the reservoir about 0.5 mile upstream from the dam.

A railroad bridge constructed by the Chesapeake & Ohio Railway, now used by successor CSX, crosses the upstream impoundment. Approximately one mile downstream of the dam lies the smaller Bedford Hydropower Project owned and operated by the Town of Bedford, Virginia.

Cushaw Hydro LLC operates the project in a run-of-river mode whereby flows through the turbines and/or over the spillway crest (elevation 656 feet msl) equal inflow to the project reservoir, as follows. Through use of a level probe equipped with an alarm and a video camera, Cushaw Hydro LLC ensures that a continuous veil of flow occurs over the 1,500-foot-long spillway. When river flows are between the maximum and minimum hydraulic capacity of the powerhouse [4,150 cubic feet per second (cfs) maximum and 700 cfs minimum], plant operators increase or decrease flows through the turbines to maintain spill over the spillway. When river flow reaches 7,000 cfs, the units are taken off line and all inflow passes over the spillway because the head is insufficient to generate energy due to the increased tailrace elevation. Similarly, when inflow is less than 700 cfs, all inflow passes over the spillway.
