= Holcomb Rock Dam =

- Location within Virginia
- Location: Bedford County, Virginia / Amherst County, Virginia, U.S.
- Coordinates: 37°30′36.15″N 79°15′57.11″W
- Purpose: Power
- Status: In use
- Opening date: 1850
- Owner: Holcomb Rock Company
- Operator: Holcomb Rock Company

Dam and spillways
- Type of dam: Concrete gravity
- Impounds: James River
- Height: 39 ft (12 m)
- Length: 644 ft (196 m)
- Spillway type: weir

Power Station
- Operator: Holcomb Rock Company
- Hydraulic head: 18

The Holcomb Rock Dam is a concrete dam across the James River near Lynchburg, Virginia. The project consists of a concrete dam across the river, an earthen embankment canal on the right bank, and a power house where water is discharged to generate electricity. Per the 2008 annual generation report, the project generated 6,089,209 KW-hours.

The dam is located downstream of the larger Coleman Falls Dam.
