= Vietnam Veterans Memorial Bridge (Richmond) =

- Coordinates: 37°26′31″N 77°25′22″W
- Carries: Motor vehicles
- Crosses: James River

Characteristics
- Total length: 1,475 feet (450 m)
- Longest span: 672 feet (205 m)
- Clearance below: 145 feet (44 m)

Statistics
- Toll: $5.20 for a two-axle vehicle

Location
- Interactive map of Vietnam Veterans Memorial Bridge

Vietnam Veterans Memorial Bridge carries the Pocahontas Parkway, signed as State Route 895, across the James River between the independent city of Richmond and Henrico County. Crossing the southernmost extremity of Richmond, it provides a connection between Henrico and the southern end of Chippenham Parkway near U.S. Route 1 in Chesterfield County, Virginia.

It is the tallest bridge in the Richmond Metropolitan Area. It is also the most expensive toll bridge in the area.

== Bridge features ==
The 1,475-foot-long (450 m), high-level fixed bridge features a 672-foot (205 m) main span with 145 feet (44 m) of vertical clearance for marine traffic using Richmond's deepwater port. The bridge also includes nearly 3,500 feet (1,100 m) of high-level approach spans and three new, high-level ramp structures that connect to Interstate 95. The high-level bridge cost $111 million.

== Public-private partnership ==
The bridge and the accompanying 8.8-mile (14.2 km) Pocahontas Parkway are toll facilities. They were built through a public-private partnership. Though the road had been planned for many years, sufficient state and federal construction funds were not available when the road was finally desired.

In 1995, the Virginia General Assembly passed the Public-Private Transportation Act allowing private entities to propose solutions for designing, constructing, financing and operating transportation improvements. A proposal for the Pocahontas Parkway and the Vietnam Veterans Memorial Bridge was submitted jointly by Fluor Daniel and Morrison-Knudsen, and an agreement was reached. At the end of the designated period, under the agreement, the ownership of both the bridge and the parkway will be turned over to the Commonwealth of Virginia.

== See also ==
- Pocahontas Parkway
