= Virginia State Route 895 =

State highway in Virginia, United States

State Route 895 Toll
- Pocahontas Parkway
- SR 895 highlighted in red

Route information
- Maintained by VDOT
- Length: 8.52 mi (13.71 km)
- Existed: 1990s–present

Major junctions
- West end: I-95 / SR 150 near Bensley
- SR 5 near Varina
- East end: I-295 near Varina

Location
- Country: United States
- State: Virginia
- Counties: Chesterfield, Henrico

Highway system
- Virginia Routes; Interstate; US; Primary; Secondary; Byways; History; HOT lanes
← I-664	→ US 1

State Route 895 (SR 895), also known as the Pocahontas Parkway and Pocahontas 895, is a controlled-access toll road in the U.S. state of Virginia. It connects the junction of Interstate 95 and State Route 150 in Chesterfield County with Interstate 295 near Richmond International Airport in Henrico County, forming part of a southeastern bypass of Richmond. Due to a quirk in the evolution of the road, the long-planned designation of Interstate 895 could not be used. (Another former I-895 is now a boulevard in The Bronx, New York, signed as New York State Route 895.)

Richmond is located on the Fall Line of the James River. The 8.8-mile (14.2 km) roadway features the costly high-level Vietnam Veterans Memorial Bridge over the shipping channel of the navigable portion of the tidal James River downstream from the deepwater Port of Richmond to allow ample clearance for ocean-going vessels to pass under. Two people were killed in accidents during the construction of the bridge.

The toll collection facility features the Richmond area's first high-speed open lanes, allowing vehicles to travel through the toll facility at highway speeds with an E-ZPass (formerly Smart Tag) electronic toll collection transponder.

== Route description ==
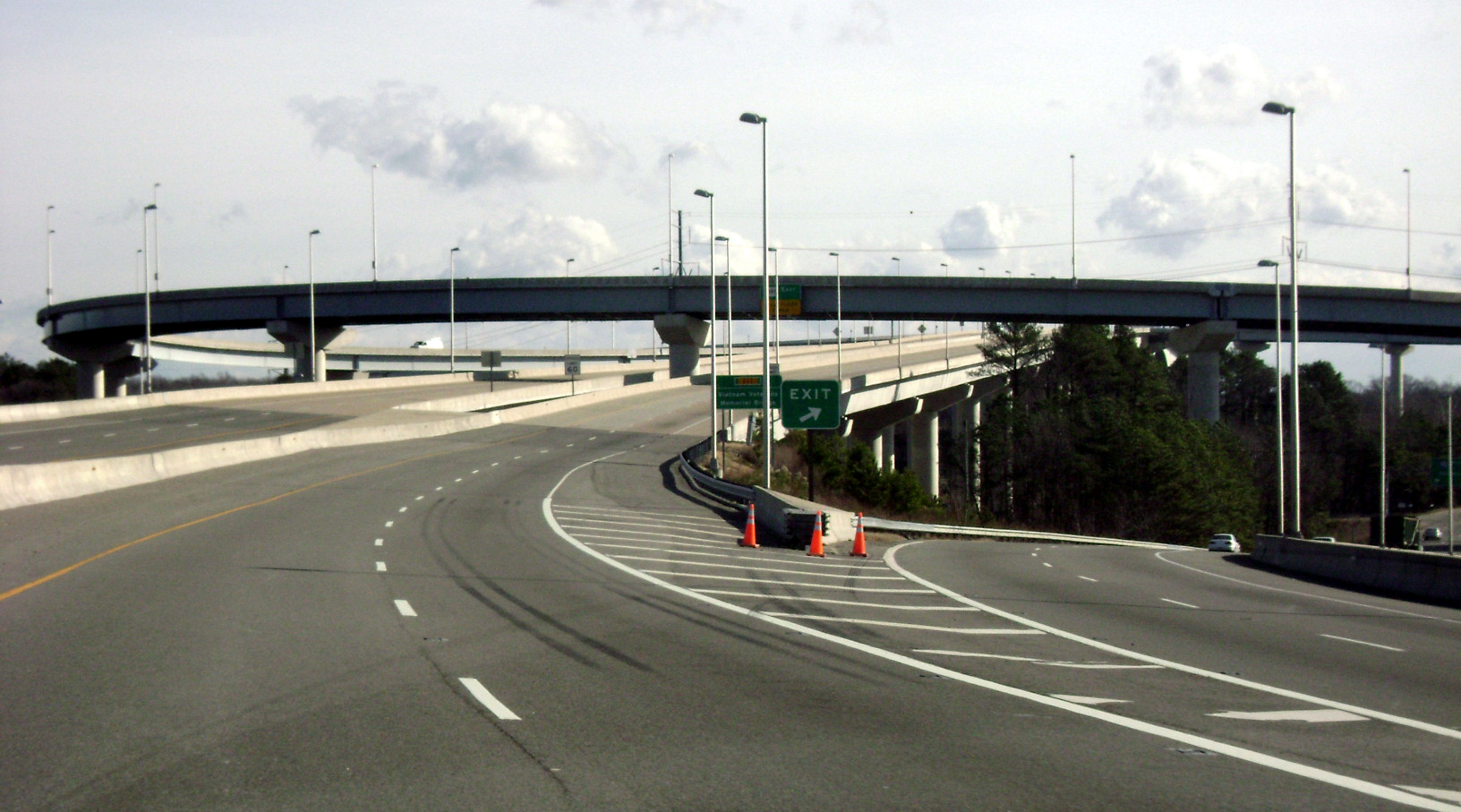
Beginning of SR 895 at the massive interchange with I-95 and SR 150

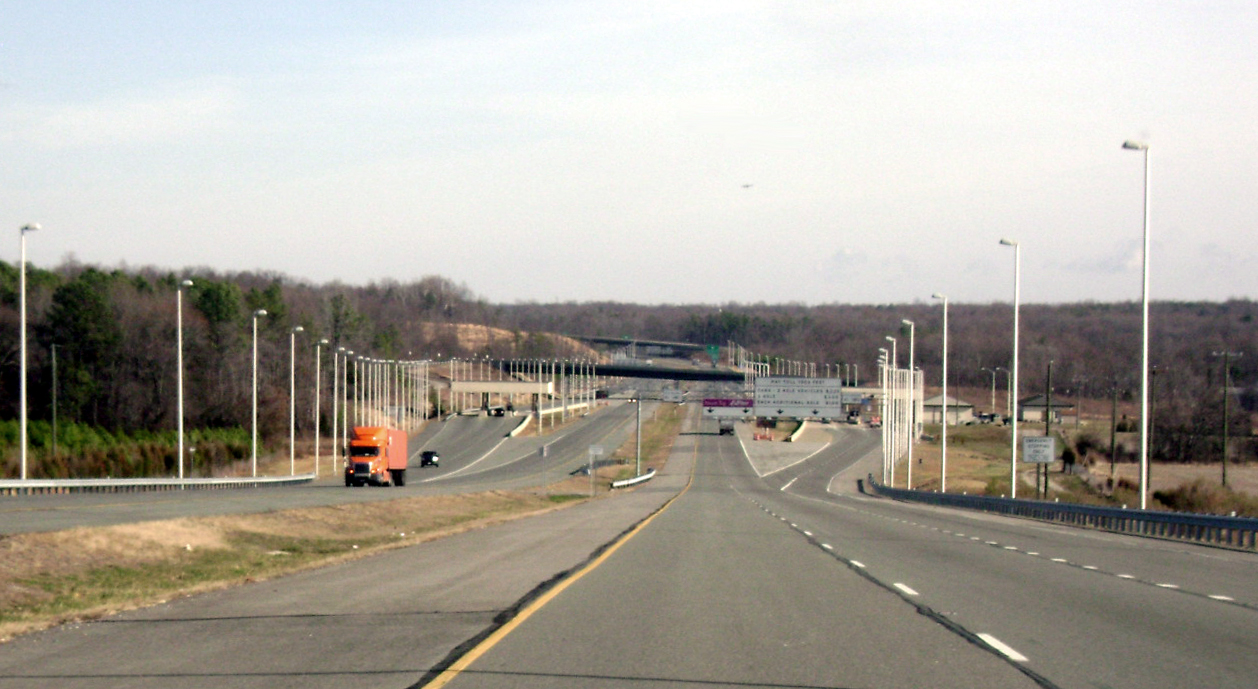
Eastbound SR 895 approaching the highway's single toll plaza

SR 895 begins as a continuation of SR 150, also known as the Chippenham Parkway, in Bensley. From SR 150's southern terminus, SR 895 begins to rise in elevation to a massive interchange between SR 895, SR 150, and I-95. Most movements between the three roads can be made by this interchange, but there is no ramp directly connecting I-95 southbound with SR 895 eastbound. At the highway's highest point, the road leaves Chesterfield County and enters Henrico County and crosses the James River on the Vietnam Veterans Memorial Bridge. The high vertical clearance is needed for marine traffic on the James River heading to the Port of Richmond therefore negating the need for a drawbridge. As the highway descends to ground, it curves to the northeast and approaches the one toll plaza on the route. Two lanes head straight through the plaza serving as open road toll lanes for E-ZPass customers; three booths to the right serve cash and credit card users.

Past the toll plaza, SR 895 has a trumpet interchange with South Laburnum Avenue. South Laburnum Avenue connects to SR 5 (New Market Road) about 0.6 miles (0.97 km) from this interchange. Nearly three miles (4.8 km) past this interchange, the highway curves to the east southeast and has another trumpet interchange, this time with Airport Drive, a connector to the Richmond International Airport. The Airport Drive interchange is also the only interchange along SR 895 with a signed exit number, in this case, exit 3. The highway ends at a trumpet interchange with I-295, an eastern bypass of Richmond. This route is often called the "Pocahontas Parkway".

Route mileposts are typically numbered by starting at the western end and increasing to the east, but SR 895's mileposts begin at the eastern end at I-295 and increase heading west.

== History ==
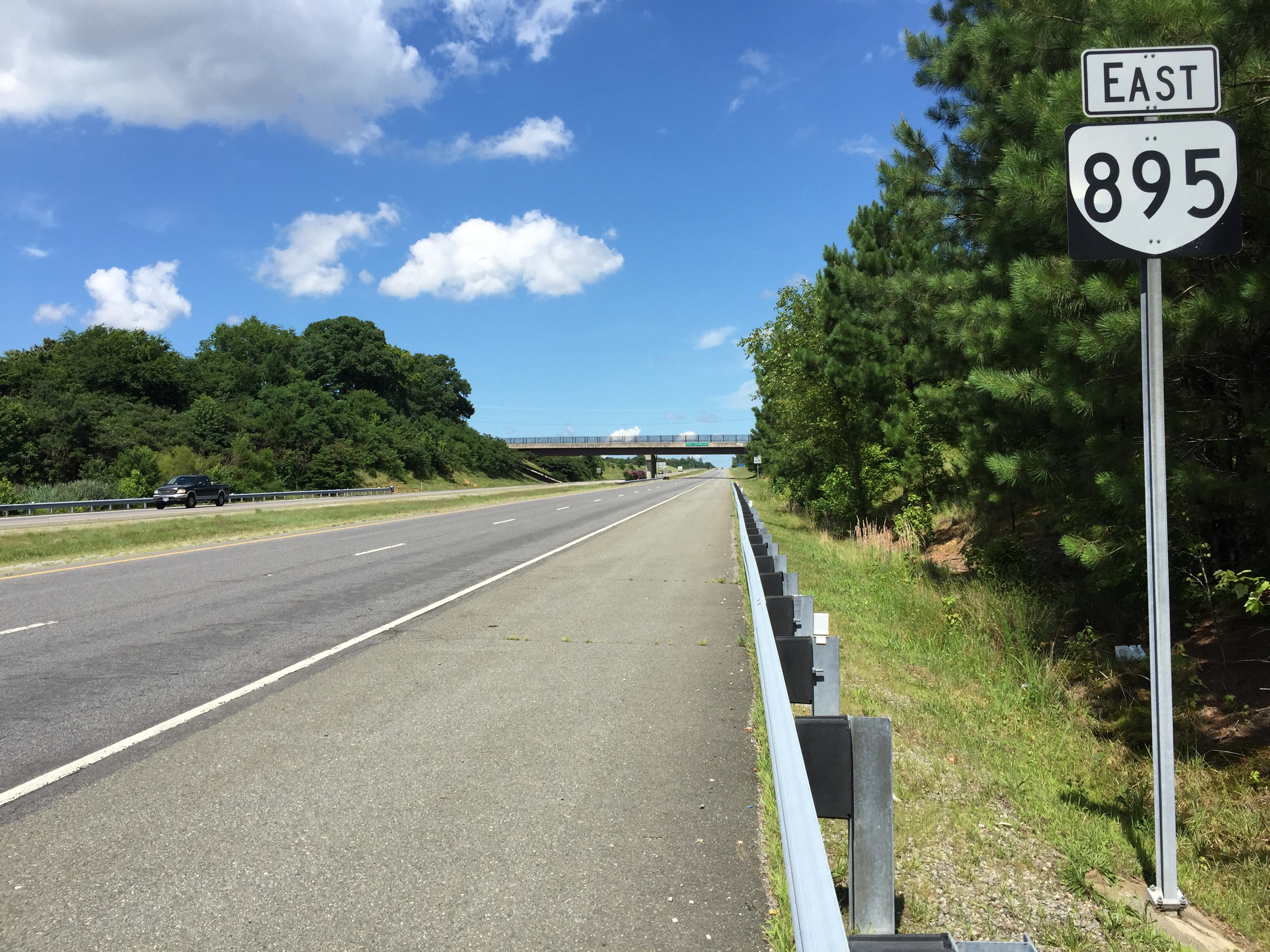
View east along SR 895 just east of Laburnum Avenue in Henrico County

=== Public-private construction ===
The highway was built without the use of toll revenue bonds through a public-private partnership. Though the road had been planned for many years, sufficient state and federal construction funds were not available when the road was finally desired. In 1995, the Virginia General Assembly passed the Public-Private Transportation Act allowing private entities to propose bids for designing, constructing, financing and operating transportation improvements. The selected proposal was submitted jointly by Fluor Daniel and Morrison-Knudsen, and an agreement was reached.

=== Interstate designation ===
Interstate 895
- Location: Richmond, Virginia
- Length: 8.8 mi (14.2 km)
- Existed: 1996–2002

The road was originally planned as Interstate 895. However, in January 2002, when the Virginia Department of Transportation sought the Interstate designation from the Federal Highway Administration, it was informed that the expressway was not qualified for such a designation, as federal statute 23 USC 129(a)(1)(A) provides that federal funds may not be used for a tolled Interstate. Thus, toll roads using no federal funds and free roads of any funding source are eligible for Interstate designation, but toll roads that use federal funds are not. In this case, $9.28 million of the preliminary engineering (out of a total $324 million cost) was funded by the federal government, and the project ultimately opened as a toll road, disqualifying the road as a bearer of an Interstate shield.

SR 895 is one of only two routes that violates Virginia's numbering convention, in which primary state highways are numbered below 600. The other such route is the unsigned SR 785, planned as Interstate 785.

=== Acquisition by Transurban ===
In May 2006, the Pocahontas Parkway was acquired by Transurban, an Australian corporation that runs toll roads. Transurban, which owns and operates the CityLink tollway in Melbourne and the M2 Hills Motorway toll road in Sydney, said that it had agreed to acquire a 99-year concession on the Pocahontas Parkway for a total cost of US$611 million (A$815 million).

=== Write-off and transfer to creditors ===
In June 2012, Transurban wrote off its 75% stake in the roadway, and reportedly considered bankruptcy. Later, in June 2013, it was announced that earnings for the road did not cover debt service, and that Transurban was planning to relinquish ownership to the consortium of European banks that provided over $300 million in financing for the project. Despite the de facto bankruptcy, normal operations for the road are expected as current revenue is sufficient to cover operating costs. On May 15, 2014, nearly a year after Transurban walked away, the toll road was transferred to DBi Services, based in northern Pennsylvania.

Acquisition by Globalvia

In December 2016, the Pocahontas Parkway was acquired by Globalvia, a Spanish multinational transport infrastructure company that operates in 11 countries across three continents.

=== Criteria to be built successfully as toll road ===
Since there are non-toll alternative routes available, certain criteria were considered before determining that the road could be successfully built and financed through tolls.

1. The relatively short road had high construction costs due principally to the requirement for a high-level bridge across the James River.
2. Of local motorists, the principal beneficiaries are businesses and residents of Chesterfield County, although very little of the roadway is actually located within that county. Thus, agreement among the regional local governments to spend limited resources on a costly roadway which primarily benefits only a single jurisdiction was problematic.
3. The new road saves considerable time and mileage for many users, allowing a cost/benefit decision by users to make use of the new road and payment of tolls more likely.
4. Planned better access to the Richmond International Airport via an additional exit will increase usage in the future.
5. The newer toll collection technology reduced operating costs and enhanced the time saving aspect for users.

=== Problems ===
Several unforeseen problems impacted the project.

1. The loss of Interstate designation. This may have ended up becoming marginal, as the major volume is local users, many of whom were long aware of the high costs in time and mileage of alternative routing.
2. The soil on the south side of the James River included shrink-swell clay which necessitated deeper foundations than originally planned.
3. In a final design phase, officials of the City of Richmond (city limits are just north of the bridge) protested the lack of access to and from I-95 in the direction of the city. With the prospect of airport access from Route 895, Richmond feared losing tourist business. A compromise reached provided a costly ramp for traffic headed toward the city, but not one for return traffic.

== Exit list ==
The exit list is listed from east to west.

County	Location	mi	km	Exit	Destinations	Notes
Henrico		0.00– 0.72	0.00– 1.16		I-295 to I-95 – Washington, Hopewell, Rocky Mount, NC	Exit 25 (I-295); eastern terminus
Henrico		2.9	4.7	3	SR 281 north (Airport Road) – Richmond International Airport	Tolled westbound exit and eastbound entrance
Henrico		5.66	9.11		SR 5 (New Market Road) / SR 197 / Laburnum Avenue	Tolled westbound exit and eastbound entrance
Henrico		7.4	11.9	Toll plaza		
James River				Vietnam Veterans Memorial Bridge		
Chesterfield	Bensley	7.88– 8.52	12.68– 13.71		I-95 / SR 150 north (Chippenham Parkway) – Petersburg, Richmond	Exit 67B (I-95); western terminus; no access from I-95 south to SR 895 east
1.000 mi = 1.609 km; 1.000 km = 0.621 mi: Incomplete access

== See also ==
- Public–private partnerships in the United States
