= Massanetta Springs, Virginia =

Massanetta Springs
- CDP
- Location of the Massanetta Springs CDP within the Rockingham County

- Location within the Commonwealth of Virginia
- Coordinates: 38°23′47″N 78°49′54″W
- Country: United States
- State: Virginia
- County: Rockingham

Population (2010)
  - Total: 4,833
- Time zone: UTC−5 (Eastern (EST))
  - Summer (DST): UTC−4 (EDT)
- ZIP codes: 22801
- FIPS code: 51-50020
- GNIS feature ID: 2629754

Massanetta Springs is a census-designated place in Rockingham County, Virginia, United States. As of the 2020 census, Massanetta Springs had a population of 6,384.

== Demographics ==
Historical population
Census	Pop.	Note	%±
2010	4,833		—
2020	6,384		32.1%
U.S. Decennial Census; 2010 2020

Massanetta Springs was first listed as a census designated place in the 2010 U.S. census.
