= James River =

River in Virginia

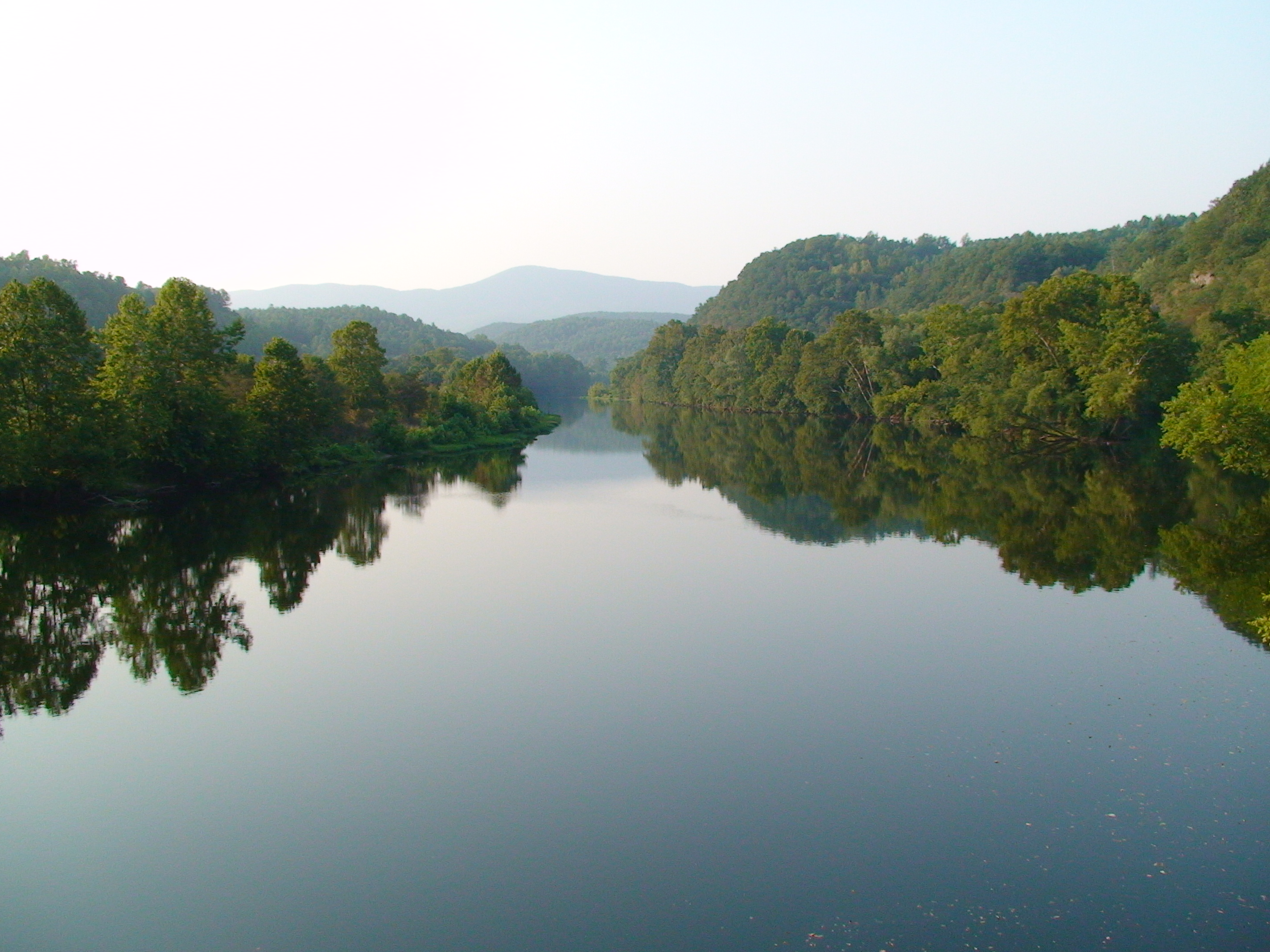
- James River at the crossing of the Blue Ridge Parkway

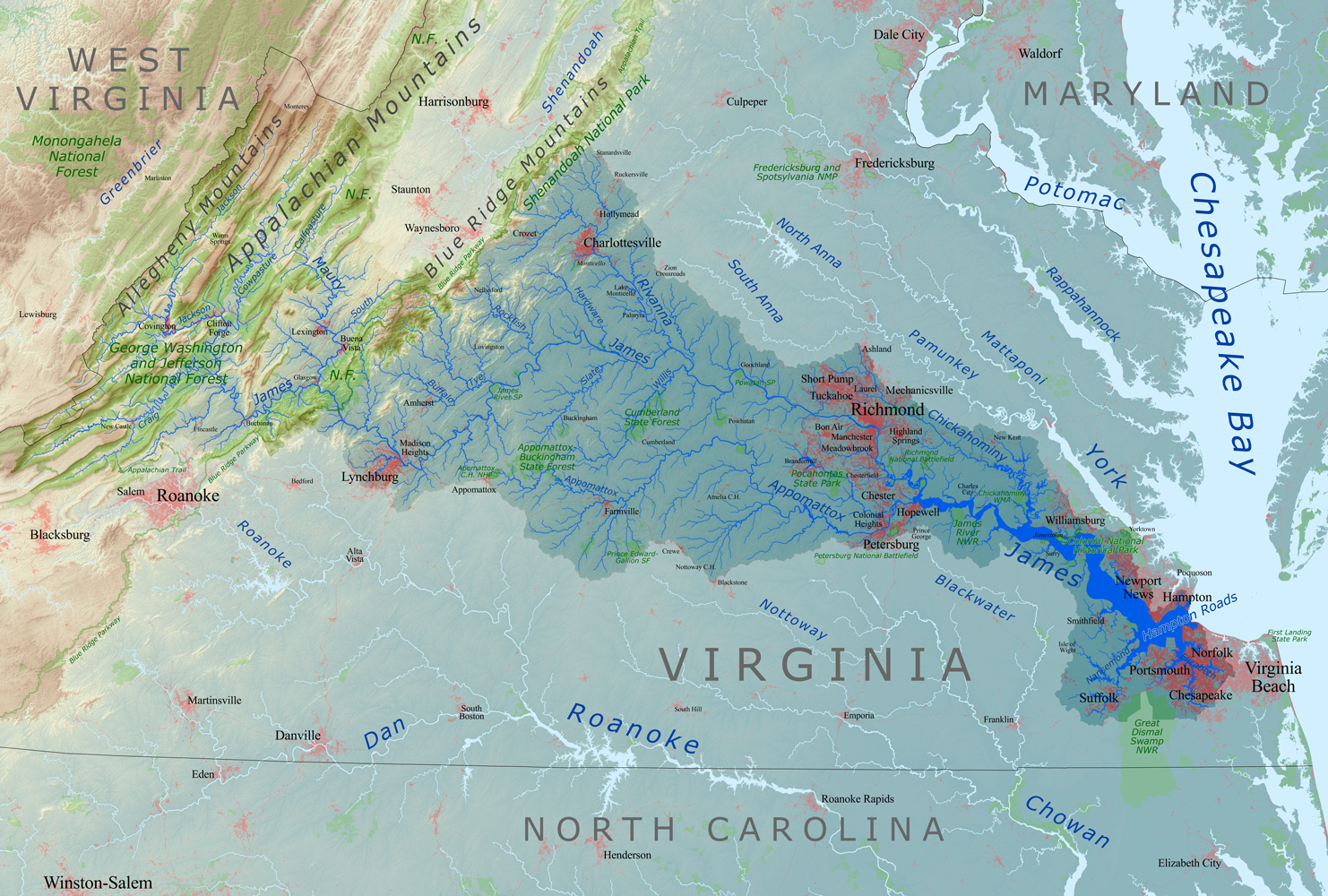
- A map of the James River drainage basin
- Etymology: King James VI and I
- Native name: Powhatan (Powhatan)

Location
- Country: United States
- State: Virginia

Physical characteristics
- Source: Confluence of Cowpasture River and Jackson River
  - location: Iron Gate, Allegheny Mountains, Virginia
  - coordinates: 37°47′4″N 79°46′33″W
- Mouth: Hampton Roads
  - location: Chesapeake Bay, Virginia
  - coordinates: 36°56′30″N 76°26′37″W
- Length: 348 mi (560 km)
- Basin size: 10,432 sq mi (27,020 km^{2})
- Discharge
  - average: 6,835 cu ft/s (193.5 m^{3}/s)
  - minimum: 10 cu ft/s (0.28 m^{3}/s)
  - maximum: 313,000 cu ft/s (8,900 m^{3}/s)

Basin features
- Tributaries
  - left: Chickahominy River
  - right: Appomattox River

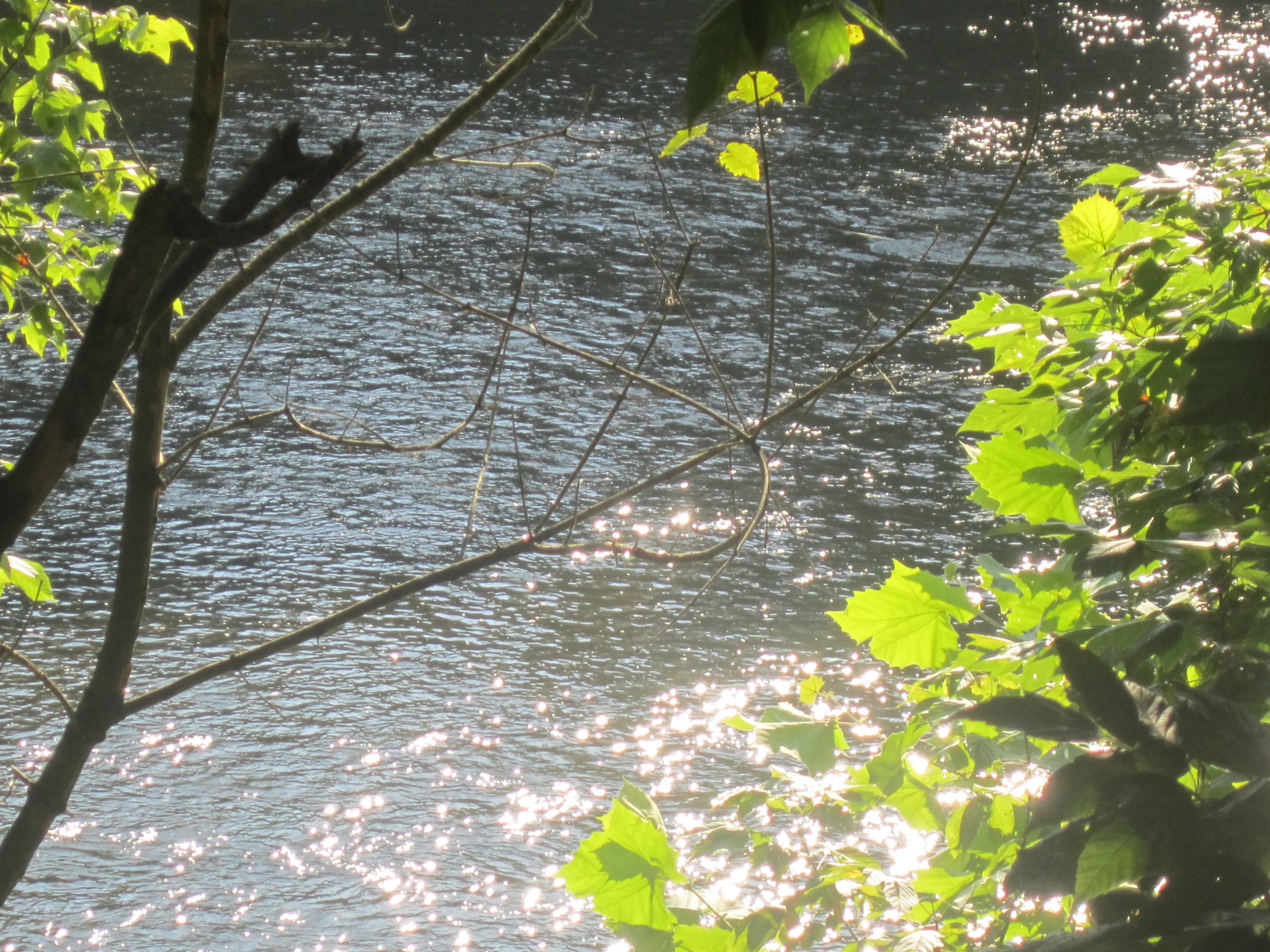
The James at Percival's Island Riverwalk in Lynchburg, Virginia

The James River is a river in Virginia that begins in the Appalachian Mountains and flows from the confluence of the Cowpasture and Jackson Rivers in Botetourt County 348 miles (560 km) to the Chesapeake Bay. The river length extends to 444 miles (715 km) if the Jackson River, the longer of its two headwaters, is included. It is the longest river in Virginia. Jamestown and Williamsburg, Virginia's first colonial capitals, and Richmond, Virginia's current capital, lie on the James River. The James River's watershed covers a large portion of the state of Virginia and impacts millions of residents. A major source of drinking water, the river is one of the most important natural resources in the state.

== History ==
The Native Americans who populated the area east of the Fall Line in the late 16th and early 17th centuries called the James River the Powhatan River, named for the Powhatans who occupied the area. The Jamestown colonists who arrived in 1607 named it "James" after King James I of England as they constructed the first permanent English settlement in the Americas along the banks of the river about 35 miles (56 km) upstream from the Chesapeake Bay.

The navigable portion of the river was the major highway of colonial Virginia during its first 15 years, facilitating supply ships delivering supplies and more emigrants from England. However, for the first five years, despite hopes of discovering gold ores, these ships sent little of monetary value back to the sponsors. In 1612, businessman John Rolfe successfully cultivated a non-native strain of tobacco which proved popular in England. Soon, the river became the primary means of exporting the large hogsheads of this cash crop from an ever-growing number of plantations with wharfs along its banks. This development made the proprietary efforts of the Virginia Company of London successful financially, spurring even more development, investments and immigration. Below the falls at Richmond, many James River plantations had their own wharves, and additional ports and/or early railheads were located at Warwick, Bermuda Hundred, City Point, Claremont, Scotland, and Smithfield, and, during the 17th century, the capital of the colony at Jamestown.

Navigation of the James River played an important role in early Virginia commerce and in the settlement of the interior, although growth of the colony was primarily in the Tidewater region during the first 75 years. The upper reaches of the river above the head of navigation at the fall line were explored by fur-trading parties sent out by Abraham Wood during the late 17th century.

Although ocean-going ships were unable to navigate beyond present-day Richmond, portage of products and navigation with smaller craft to transport crops other than tobacco was feasible. Produce from the Piedmont and Great Valley regions descended the river to seaports at Richmond and Manchester through such port towns as Lynchburg, Scottsville, Columbia and Buchanan.

=== James River and Kanawha Canal ===
The James River was considered a route for transport of produce from the Ohio Valley. The James River and Kanawha Canal was built for this purpose, to provide a navigable portion of the Kanawha River, a tributary of the Ohio River. For the most mountainous section between the two points, the James River and Kanawha Turnpike was built to provide a portage link for wagons and stagecoaches. However, before the canal could be fully completed, in the mid-19th century, railroads emerged as a more practical technology and eclipsed canals for economical transportation, ending the canal's progress at Eagle Rock. The Chesapeake and Ohio Railway (C&O) was completed between Richmond and the Ohio River at the new city of Huntington, West Virginia by 1873, dooming the canal's economic prospects. In the late-19th century, the Richmond and Alleghany Railroad was laid along the eastern portion of the canal's towpath, and became part of the C&O within 10 years. In modern times, this rail line is used primarily in transporting West Virginia coal to export coal piers at Newport News.

=== Kepone contamination ===
During the 1960s and 1970s, mishandling and dumping of the insecticide Kepone, the brand name for chlordecone, resulted in the contamination of large stretches of the James River estuary downstream of the Allied Signal Company and LifeSciences Product Company plants in Hopewell, Virginia. Because of the pollution, sections of the river were considered "dead" and unfit for human use, and many businesses and restaurants along the river suffered economic losses. In December 1975 Virginia Governor Mills Godwin Jr. shut down the James River to fishing for 100 miles, from Richmond to the Chesapeake Bay. This ban remained in effect for 13 years, until efforts to clean up the river began to show results. A decade's worth of accumulated silt, lying above the contaminated riverbed, helped to reduce levels of the chemical.

=== Clean-up ===
Since the 1970s, the health of the James River has improved substantially. The Chesapeake Bay Agreement of 1983, signed by the governors of Maryland, Virginia, and Pennsylvania, the mayor of the District of Columbia, and the EPA, established baseline environmental protections and promoted regional cooperation conducive to river clean-up. This original agreement has evolved as the Chesapeake Bay Program.

== Watershed and course ==
The James River drains a catchment comprising 10,432 square miles (27,020 km^{2}). The watershed includes about 4% open water and an area with a population of 2.5 million people (2000). The James River forms near Iron Gate on the border between Alleghany and Botetourt counties, from the confluence of the Cowpasture and Jackson rivers in the Appalachian Mountains. It flows into the Chesapeake Bay at Hampton Roads. Tidal waters extend west to Richmond at the river's fall line (the head of navigation). The fall line of the rivers shows the transition between the coastal plains region and the piedmont region. This is where the flow of the water shifts from fast paced currents, through rocky sections to slower paced, and wider tidal flows. This switch, played a significant role in settlement and development patterns in Virginia. Within this watershed, there is a large network of interconnected ecosystems and tributaries that play a role in the flow of the river, biodiversity of the river, and the water quality. This demonstrates the James River's role as a part of a larger environmental system.

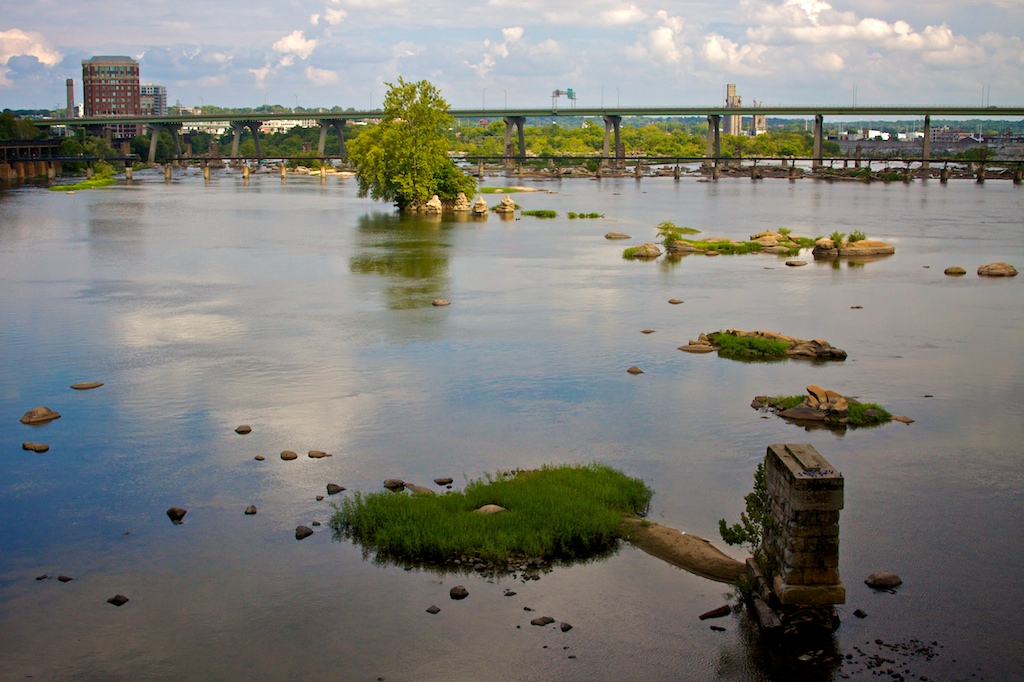
The James River through Richmond, Virginia

Larger tributaries draining to the tidal portion include the Appomattox River, Chickahominy River, Warwick River, Pagan River, and the Nansemond River.

At its mouth near Newport News Point, the Elizabeth River and the Nansemond River join the James River to form the harbor area known as Hampton Roads. Between the tip of the Virginia Peninsula near Old Point Comfort and the Willoughby Spit area of Norfolk in South Hampton Roads, a channel leads from Hampton Roads into the southern portion of the Chesapeake Bay and out to the Atlantic Ocean a few miles further east. Many boats pass through this river to import and export Virginia products.

=== Major tributaries ===
- Appomattox River
- Chickahominy River
- Warwick River
- Pagan River
- Nansemond River
- Looney Creek
- Cowpasture River
- Jackson River
- Craig Creek
- Catawba Creek
- Maury River

== Recreation ==
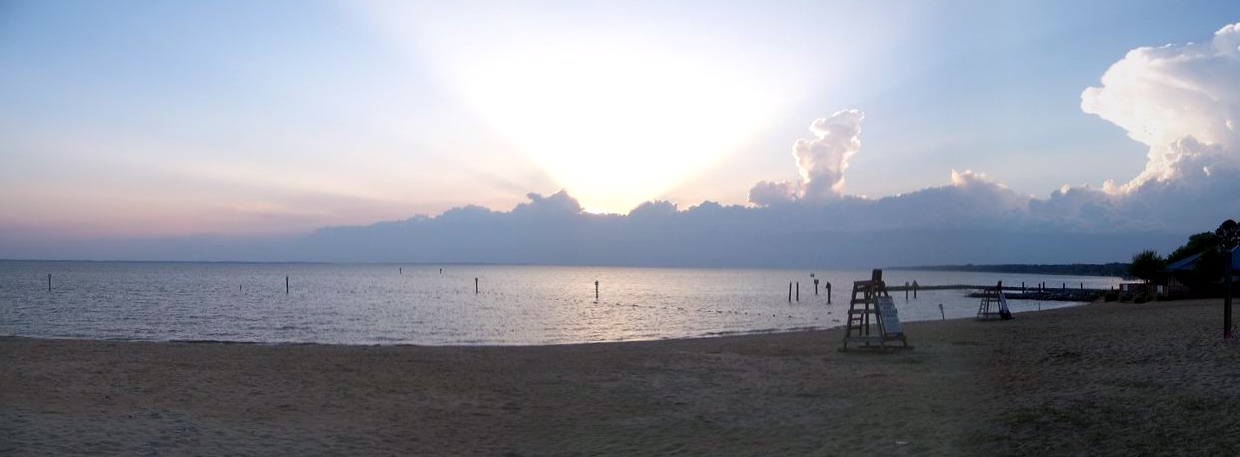
James River at Huntington Park Beach in Newport News

The James River contains many parks and other recreational attractions. Canoeing, fishing, kayaking, hiking, and swimming are some of the activities that people enjoy along the river during the summer. From the river's start in the Blue Ridge Mountains to Richmond, numerous rapids and pools offer fishing and whitewater rafting. The most intense whitewater stretch is a 2-mile (3 km) segment that ends in downtown Richmond where the river goes over the fall line. This is the only place in the country where extensive class III (class IV with above average river levels) whitewater conditions exist within sight of skyscrapers. Below the fall line east of Richmond, the river is better suited for water skiing and other large boat recreation. The river additionally plays a significant role in fishing industries, tourism, and other outdoor activities. These highlight how the James River has importance in not only its historical uses but also in the modern day. Here the river is known for its blue catfish, reaching average sizes of 20 to 30 pounds (9.1 to 13.6 kg), with frequent catches exceeding 50 pounds (23 kg). In the Chesapeake watershed, the James River is the last confirmed holdout for the nearly extirpated Atlantic sturgeon. In May 2007 a survey identified 175 sturgeon remaining in the entire river, with 15 specimens exceeding 5 feet (1.5 m).

== Dams ==
Due to its potential for generating mechanical power for rotating machinery such as grist mills, hydroelectric power, and as a water route for trade, many dams have been built across the James River since the time of European settlement of the region. While most of these dams have been removed or failed, several dams still exist along the upper course of the river. From the head of the river downstream to Richmond are found the following dams as identified by the current US Army Corps of Engineers National Inventory of Dams:

- The Cushaw Hydroelectric Project near Glasgow and Big Island.
- The Bedford Hydropower Project near Big Island.
- The Big Island Dam near Big Island.
- The Coleman Falls Dam in Coleman Falls
- The Holcomb Rock Dam near Lynchburg.
- The Reusens Dam near Lynchburg.
- The Scotts Mill Dam in Lynchburg.
- The Bosher Dam in Richmond.

The tallest dam is the Reusens Dam, which also has the greatest hydroelectric nameplate capacity and the greatest reservoir capacity. At 1,617 feet, the longest dam is the Cushaw Hydroelectric Project due to the highly angled path the dam takes across the river.

While not identified in the National Inventory of Dams, a very low head weir structure is found below Bosher Dam in Richmond on either side of Williams Island. Known as the "Z-Dam" for its zigzag course on the south side of the island, the current structure was built in 1932 and serves to direct water into Richmond's water treatment facility on the north bank. The less than 5 feet tall dam does not serve any power or navigation purpose.

== Bridges ==
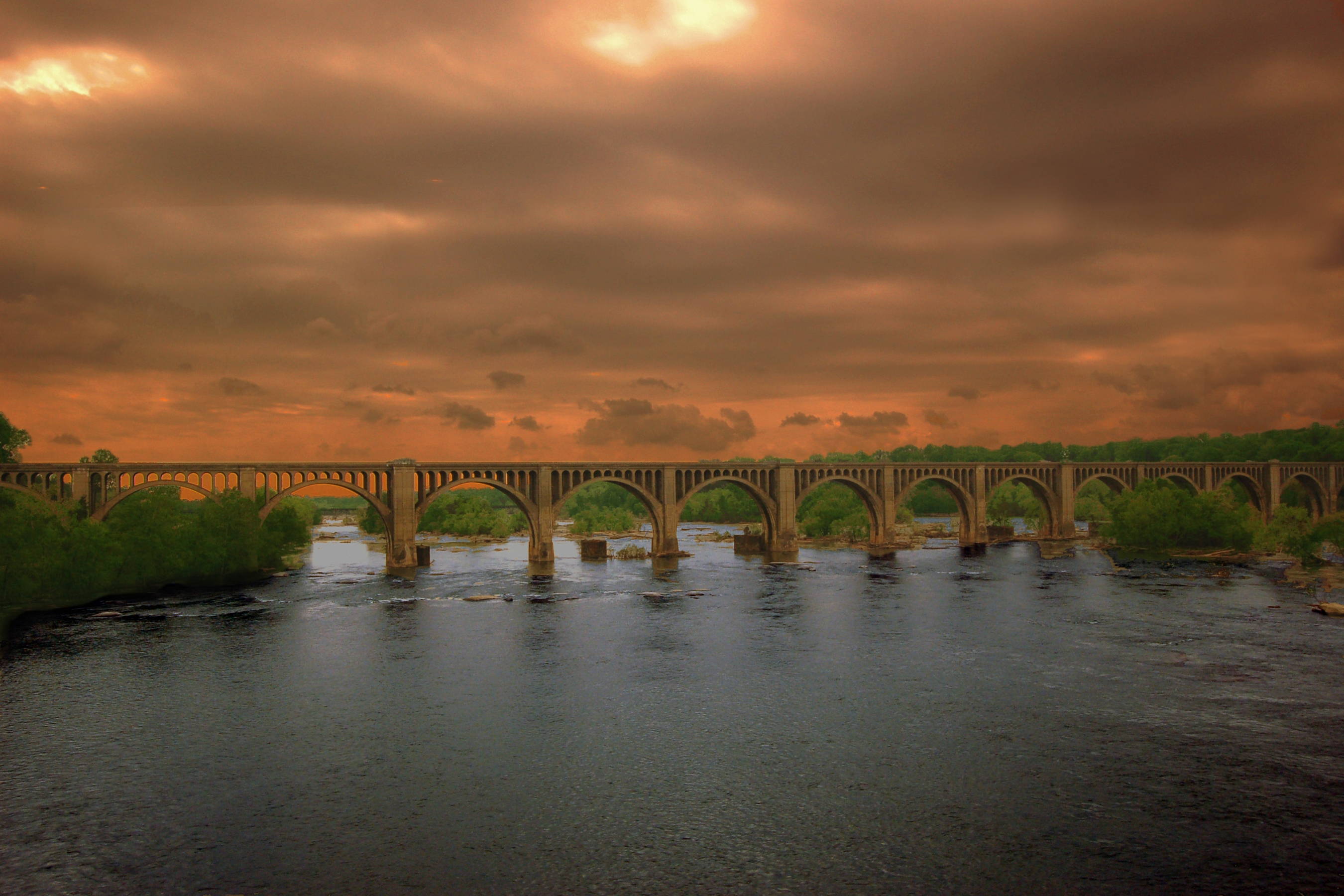
ACL Railroad crossing at the falls in Richmond.

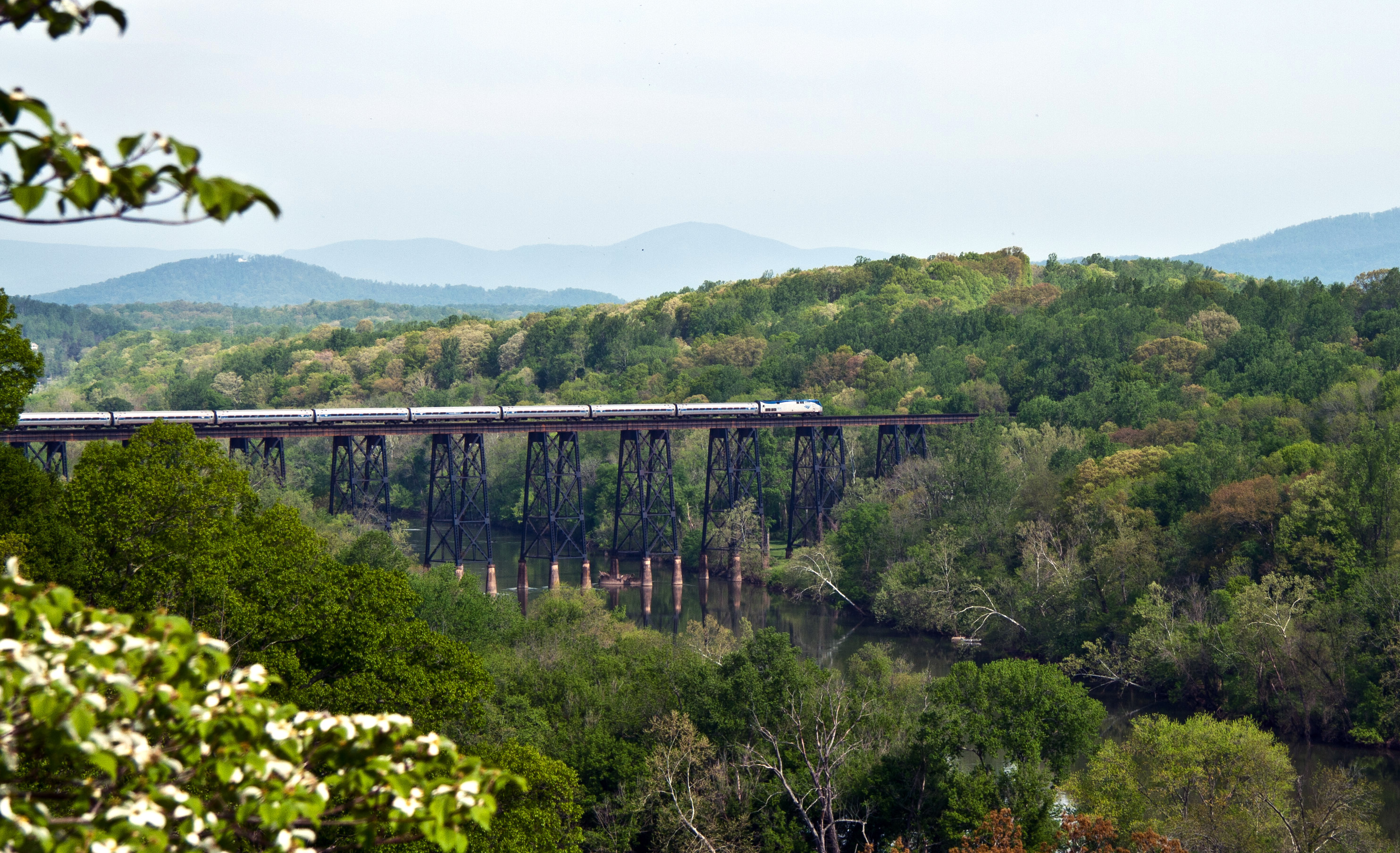
Amtrak's Northeast Regional crosses near Lynchburg.

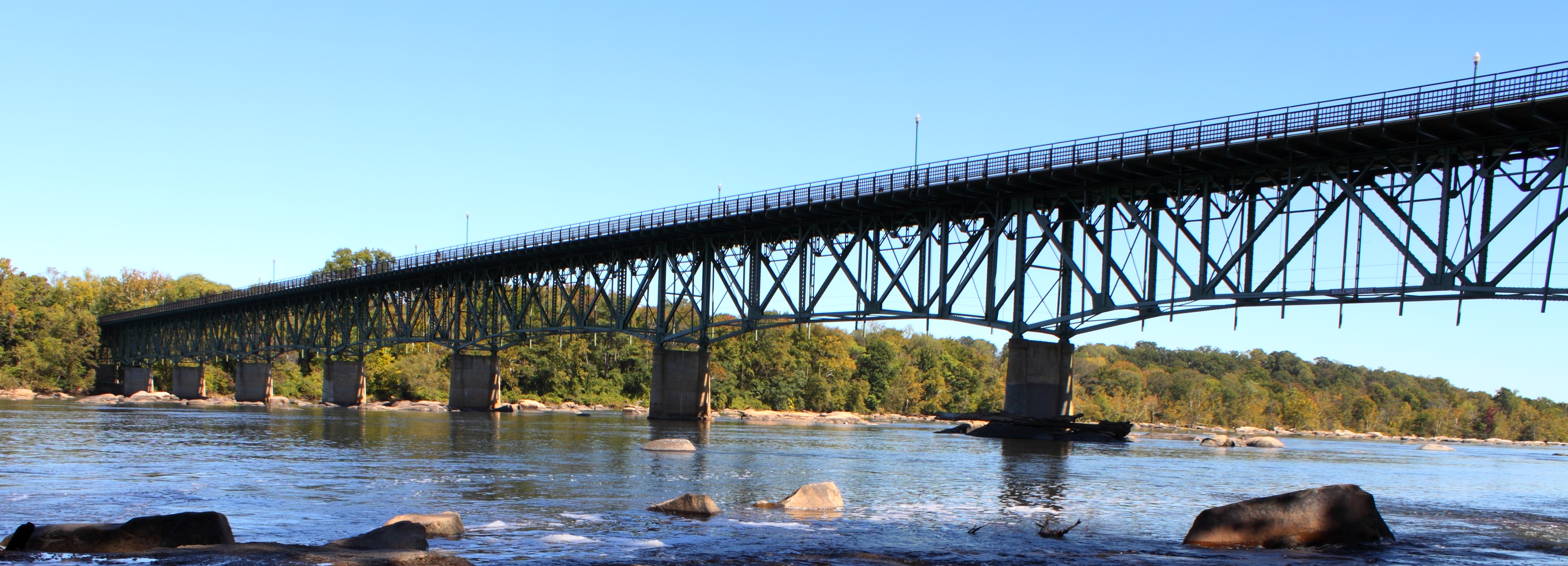
Boulevard Bridge in Richmond

=== Highway bridges below Richmond ===
In the Hampton Roads area, the river is as much as 5 miles (8.0 km) wide at points. Due to ocean-going shipping upriver as far as the Port of Richmond, a combination of ferryboats, high bridges and bridge-tunnels are used for highway traffic. Crossings east to west include:

- The Hampton Roads Bridge-Tunnel (I-64)
- The Monitor-Merrimac Memorial Bridge-Tunnel (I-664)
- The James River Bridge (US 17/ US 258/ VA 32)
- The Jamestown Ferry (VA 31) (toll-free)
- The Benjamin Harrison Memorial Bridge near Hopewell. This is a drawbridge on VA 106 / VA 156 which replaced ferry service in 1966. It was the site of a major collision of a ship in 1977.
- The Varina-Enon Bridge is a high cable-stayed bridge carrying I-295 which was the second of its type in the U.S. when it was completed.
- The Vietnam Veterans Memorial Bridge carries the Pocahontas Parkway (State Route 895) via a high-level bridge to connect to State Route 150 at Interstate 95.

The SR 895 high-level crossing is the last bridge east of the Deepwater Port of Richmond and head of ocean-going navigation at the fall line of the James River. West of this point, potential flooding is more of an engineering concern than clearance for watercraft.

=== Highway bridges at Richmond ===
The following is a list of extant highway bridges across the James River with one or both ends within the City of Richmond.

- Interstate 95 James River Bridge (I-95)
- Mayo Bridge (US-360)
- Manchester Bridge (US-60)
- Robert E. Lee Memorial Bridge (US-1, US-301 and U.S. Bicycle Route 1)
- Boulevard Bridge (VA-161) (toll bridge, restricted weights)
- Powhite Parkway Bridge (Powhite Parkway and VA-76) (toll bridge)
- Huguenot Memorial Bridge (VA-147)
- Edward E. Willey Bridge (VA-150)

=== Highway bridges west of Richmond ===
The following is a partial, incomplete list of extant highway bridges across the James River west of Richmond.

- World War II Veterans Memorial Bridge (SR 288)
- U.S. Route 522 near Maidens
- State Route 45 near Cartersville
- Columbia Road (Route 690) near Columbia
- U.S. Route 15 near Bremo Bluff
- State Route 602 at Howardsville
- State Route 20 near Scottsville
- State Route 56 near Wingina
- U.S. Route 60 at Bent Creek
- Monacan Bridge (U.S. Route 29 east of Lynchburg)
- Carter Glass Memorial Bridge (U.S. Route 29 Business at Lynchburg)
- John Lynch Memorial Bridge (Lynchburg)
- Blue Ridge Parkway near Big Island
- U.S. Route 501 at Snowden
- State Route 759 at Natural Bridge Station
- State Route 614 at Arcadia
- U.S. Route 11, State Route 43 and U.S. Bicycle Route 76 at Buchanan
- Interstate 81 at Buchanan
- State Route 630 at Springwood
- James Street at Eagle Rock connecting U.S. Route 220 and State Route 43
- U.S. Route 220 near Eagle Rock
- Bridge Street at Glen Wilton
- U.S. Route 220 near Iron Gate

=== Bicycles ===
The Monitor-Merrimac Memorial Bridge-Tunnel prohibits bicycles, but bicyclists may take the Jamestown Ferry. After a fatal accident on the Boulevard Bridge, the City of Richmond requires bicycles to travel on the sidewalk for the length of the bridge.

== James River Reserve Fleet ==
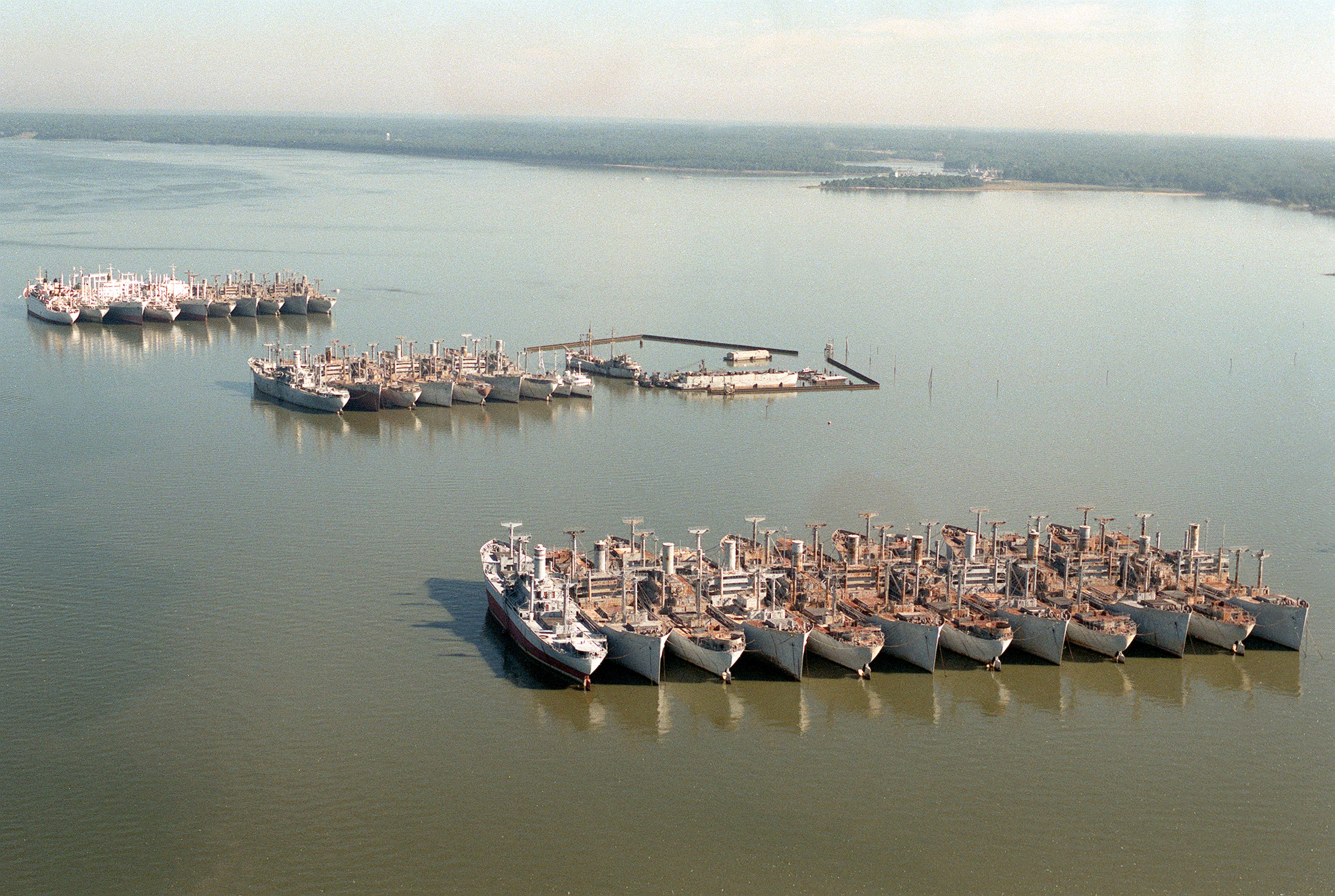
Part of the James River Fleet

The James River Reserve Fleet is the anchorage (37.120393°N 76.646469°W) for a large portion of the National Defense Reserve Fleet, called the "James River fleet" or the "ghost fleet", consisting of "mothballed" ships, mostly merchant vessels, that can be activated within 20 to 120 days to provide shipping for the United States during national emergencies, either military or non-military, such as commercial shipping crises. The fleet is managed by the U.S. Department of Transportation's Maritime Administration and is based in Fort Eustis, Virginia. It is a different entity from the United States Navy reserve fleets, which consist largely of warships.

== See also ==
- List of rivers of Virginia
- James River bateau
- James River Squadron
- Army of the James
- Atlantic Reserve Fleet, Norfolk
