= World War II Veterans Memorial Bridge (Virginia) =

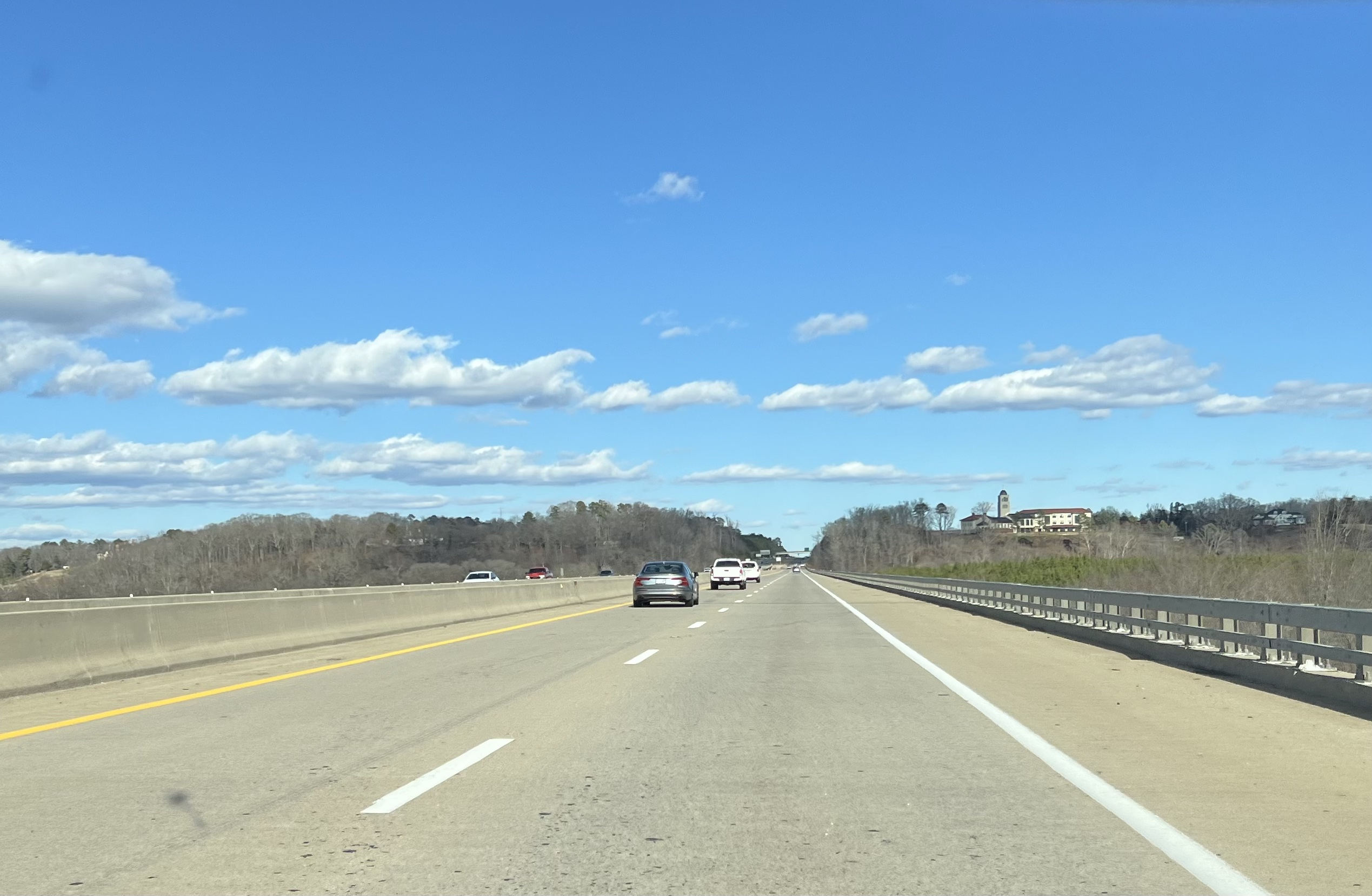
- Coordinates: 37.574630°N 77.680410°W
- Carries: Motor vehicles
- Crosses: James River
- Maintained by: Virginia Department of Transportation

Characteristics
- Total length: 3,642 feet (1,110 m)

History
- Opened: 2004

Location
- Interactive map of World War II Veterans Memorial Bridge

World War II Veteran's Memorial Bridge is a twin-span 3,642-foot-long (1,110 m) bridge which carries State Route 288 across the James River between Powhatan County and Goochland County in Virginia. State Route 288 forms a semi-circumferential beltway around the southwestern quadrant of the Richmond metropolitan area connecting with Interstate 95 on the southern end and Interstate 64 on the northern end.

The Virginia General Assembly proposed and passed the naming of the World War II Veterans Memorial Bridge in 2003. The Bridge was completed in 2004, and is owned by the Virginia Department of Transportation (VDOT).
