= Big Island, Virginia =

- Census-designated place
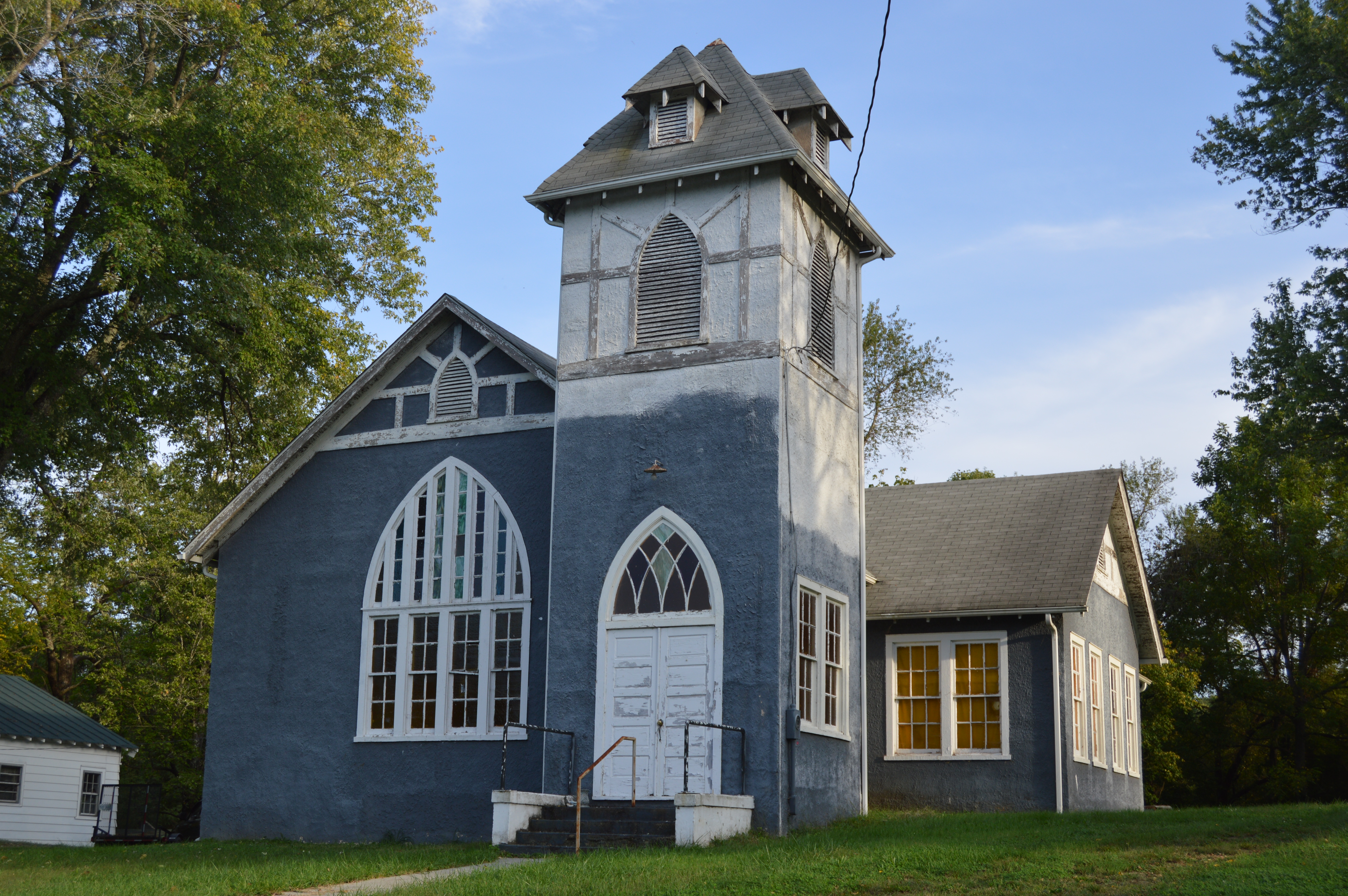
- Big Island United Methodist Church (former)

- Location within the Commonwealth of Virginia Big Island, Virginia (the United States)
- Coordinates: 37°32′3″N 79°21′43″W
- Country: United States
- State: Virginia
- County: Bedford

Area
  - Total: 0.830 sq mi (2.15 km^{2})
  - Land: 0.823 sq mi (2.13 km^{2})
  - Water: 0.007 sq mi (0.018 km^{2})
- Elevation: 839.6 ft (255.9 m)

Population (2020)
  - Total: 300
  - Density: 360/sq mi (140/km^{2})
- Time zone: UTC−5 (Eastern (EST))
  - Summer (DST): UTC−4 (EDT)
- ZIP Code: 24526
- Area code: Area code 434
- FIPS code: 51-07400
- GNIS feature ID: 2629017

Big Island is a census-designated place (CDP) in northern Bedford County, Virginia, United States. The population as of the 2020 United States census was 300. The CDP is located along the James River and U.S. Route 501, between Glasgow and Coleman Falls. It is part of the Lynchburg Metropolitan Statistical Area.

== History ==
The area is named for a large, uninhabited island in the river upstream from the community.

== Geography ==
According to the United States Census Bureau, the CDP has a total area of 0.830 square miles (2.15 km^{2}).

== Demographics ==
Historical population
Census	Pop.	Note	%±
2010	303		—
2020	300		−1.0%
U.S. Decennial Census; 2010

Big Island was first listed as a census designated place in the 2010 U.S. census.

=== 2020 census ===
As of the census of 2020, there were 300 people residing in the CDP. There were 153 housing units. The racial makeup of the CDP was 268 White people, 19 African American or Black, and 12 from two or more races. Only one resident was Hispanic or Latino of any race.

=== 2010 census ===
As of the census of 2010, there were 303 people residing in the CDP. There were 153 housing units. The racial makeup of the CDP was 95.4% White, 4.0% African American or Black, 0.3% American Indian, 0.0% Asian, 0.0% Pacific Islander, 0.0% from other races, and 0.3% from two or more races. Hispanic or Latino of any race were 0.3% of the population.

== Economy ==
The community is centered around a Georgia-Pacific paper mill that has been in operation for more than 125 years and is considered one of the longest continuously producing paper mills in the United States.

== Government ==
The United States Postal Service operates the Big Island Post Office within the CDP.

== Education ==
The CDP is served by Bedford County Public Schools. Public school students residing in Big Island are zoned to attend Big Island Elementary School, Liberty Middle School, and Liberty High School.

The closest higher education institutions are located in Bedford and Lynchburg.

== Infrastructure ==
The Bedford Hydropower Project and larger Cushaw Hydroelectric Project dams are located near Big Island and provide electricity to a portion of Bedford County, including the Town of Bedford.

=== Public safety ===
Fire protection is provided by the Big Island Volunteer Fire Company, which operates a fire station within the CDP. Emergency medical services are provided by the Big Island Emergency Crew. Law enforcement is provided by the Bedford County Sheriffs Office and Virginia State Police.

=== Transportation ===
==== Airports ====
The Lynchburg Regional Airport is the closest airport with commercial service to the CDP.

==== Roads ====
- US 501 (Lee Jackson Highway)
- SR 122 (Big Island Highway)
- Blue Ridge Parkway

==== Rail ====
The CSX operated James River Subdivision runs through the CDP. The closest passenger rail service is located in Lynchburg.
