= Lynchburg Expressway =

The Lynchburg Expressway is a freeway in Lynchburg, Virginia, United States. It carries portions of

- U.S. Route 29 Business
- U.S. Route 501
