= Mountain stream =

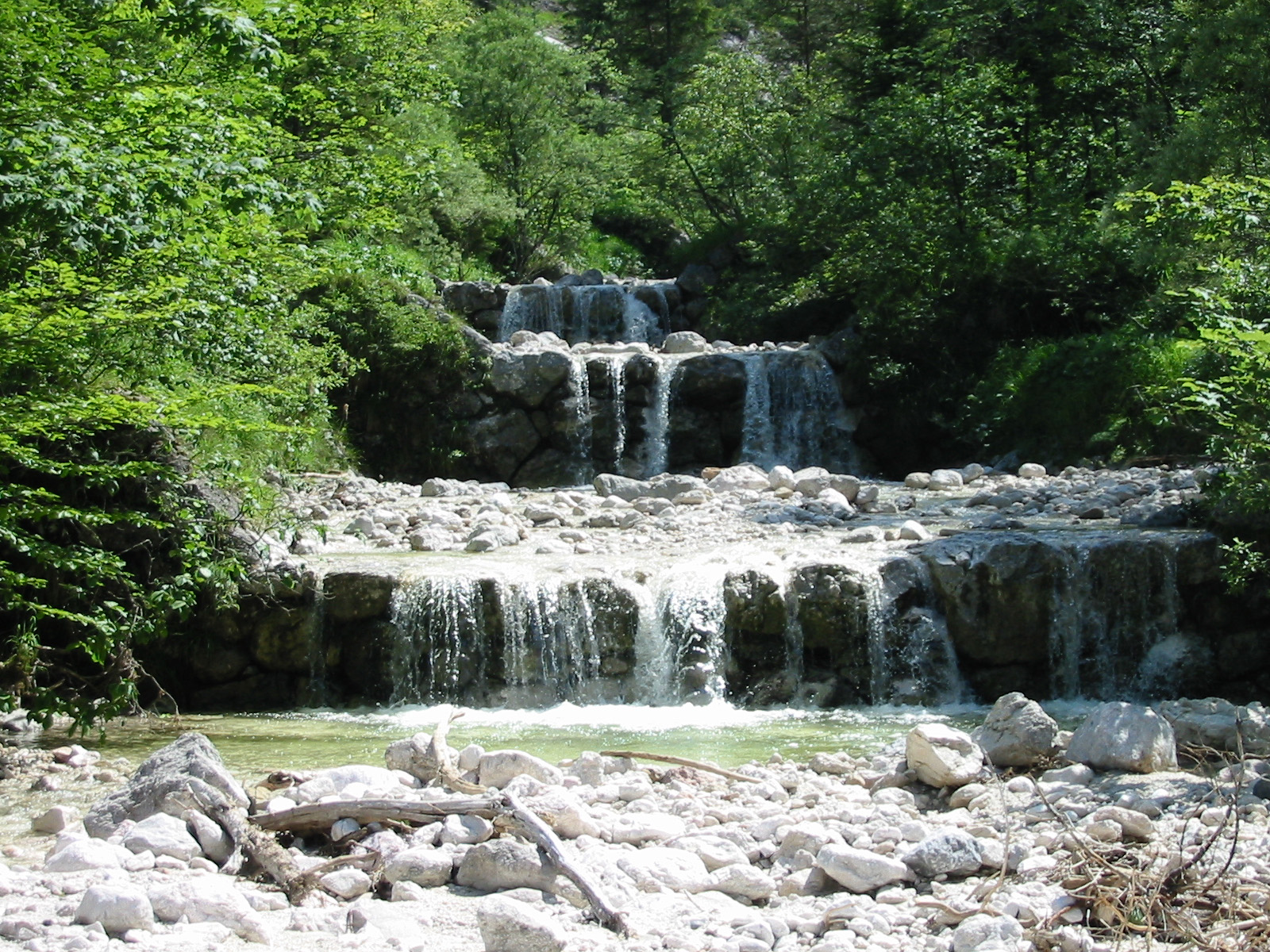
The Weißbach in the Latten Mountains

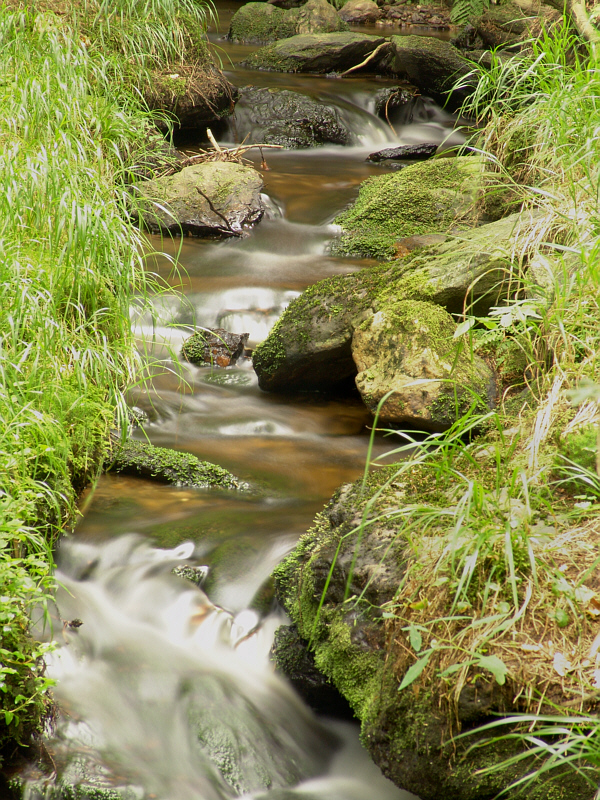
The Muglbach in the Upper Palatine Forest of Bavaria

A mountain stream is a brook or stream, usually with a steep gradient, flowing down a mountainside. Its swift flow rate often transports large quantities of rock, gravel, soil, wood or even entire logs with the stream. The main characteristic of mountain streams in the Alpine region is their steep gradient and sharply varying rates of flow within a short period of time, as a result of snowmelt and sudden storms. Streams of such nature are rarer in gently rolling countryside, although they may occur on scarp slopes where, although the height difference is not so great, they tend to have a larger catchment area than mountain streams.

Mountain streams may be broadly divided into three sections. In the "catchment funnel" (Sammeltrichter) high on the mountainsides, water and eroded soil, rock and gravel are gathered. The stream then flows at high speed through a "drainage channel" (Abflussrinne) into the "alluvial fan" where the transported debris is deposited.

In Austria a mountain stream or Wildbach is even defined in law.

== Dangers ==
The material transported by a mountain stream can present serious dangers to people, animals and cultural landscapes, for example:

- Serious erosion – scouring of the stream bed,
- Subsequent landslips,
- Endangering of mountain forest and protected forest,
- Formation of a gorge,
- Release of a mudflow,
- Creation of a narrow section and impoundment of the stream – endangering settlements when it empties,
- Excessive deposition of debris, sediment and coarse gravel – sometimes further downstream at a debris cone or alluvial fan,
- Movement of the stream bed.

To combat several of these dangers, measures such as a check dam may be implemented to guard against flooding.

Usually the regional forestry or conservation department is responsible for the management of mountain streams.
