= Southside (Richmond, Virginia) =

Neighborhood of Richmond, Virginia, United States

Coordinates: 37.4756°N 77.460°W

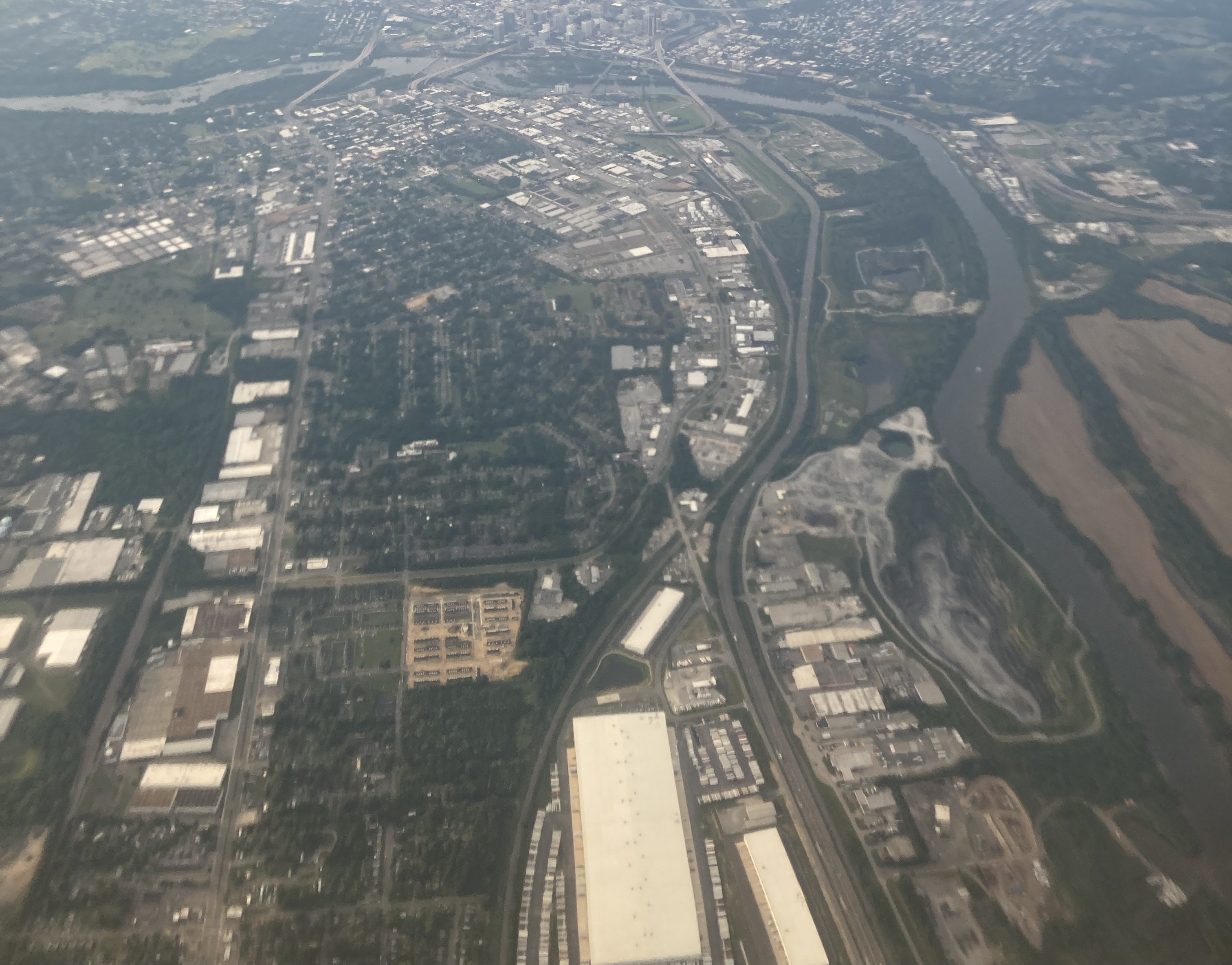
An aerial view of Southside, from a plane (2024).

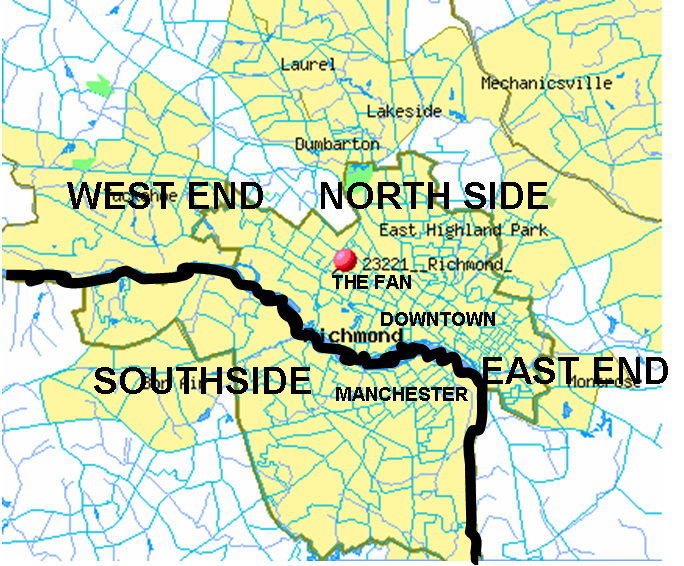
Richmond is often subdivided into North Side, Southside, East End and West End

The Chippenham Parkway (State Route 150) and Virginia State Route 288 are the main beltways through Southside Richmond, while the Powhite Parkway and I-95 are the primary limited-access highway routes into Downtown Richmond from Southside.

The Southside of Richmond is an area of the Metropolitan Statistical Area surrounding Richmond, Virginia. It generally includes all portions of the City of Richmond that lie south of the James River, and includes all of the former city of Manchester. Depending on context, the term "Southside of Richmond" can include some northern areas of adjacent Chesterfield County, Virginia in the Richmond-Petersburg region. With minor exceptions near Bon Air, the Chippenham Parkway forms the border between Chesterfield County and the City of Richmond portions of Southside, with some news agencies using the term "South Richmond" to refer to the locations in Southside located in the city proper.

== Definition ==
Since there is no one municipal organization that represents this specific region, the boundaries are loosely defined as being south of the James River and west of Interstate 95 (formerly Richmond-Petersburg Turnpike) with a southern border extending approximately to Chester, Virginia and extending west along Virginia State Route 288 beltway. Some portions of the Southside of Richmond closest to the downtown area north of the river are also considered part of Downtown Richmond.

== North Chesterfield ==
Southside generally comprises the area between the James River and SR 288. With minor exceptions, Chippenham Parkway (State Route 150) forms the border between the City of Richmond and the County of Chesterfield.

Several ZIP codes on the Southside have a preferred place name of "Richmond, Virginia" even though in some cases that land falls under the completely separate municipal authority of Chesterfield County. For example, the 23235 ZIP code (Bon Air) straddles the city-county boundary.

In 2011, the U.S. Postal Service approved Chesterfield County's request to refer to ZIP codes 23224, 23225, 23234, 23235, 23236 and 23237 as "North Chesterfield, VA," when they are in Chesterfield County, even though the Post Office's preferred place name for the entire ZIP code remains as "Richmond, Virginia." The rationale for this change was that some Chesterfield County residents were confused, and paying taxes to the City of Richmond given their street address included a Richmond ZIP code.

Chesterfield residents in the 23235 ZIP code continue to have the option of using "Bon Air" as their preferred place name, although they can also use "North Chesterfield, Virginia 23235" or "Richmond, Virginia 23235."

== History ==
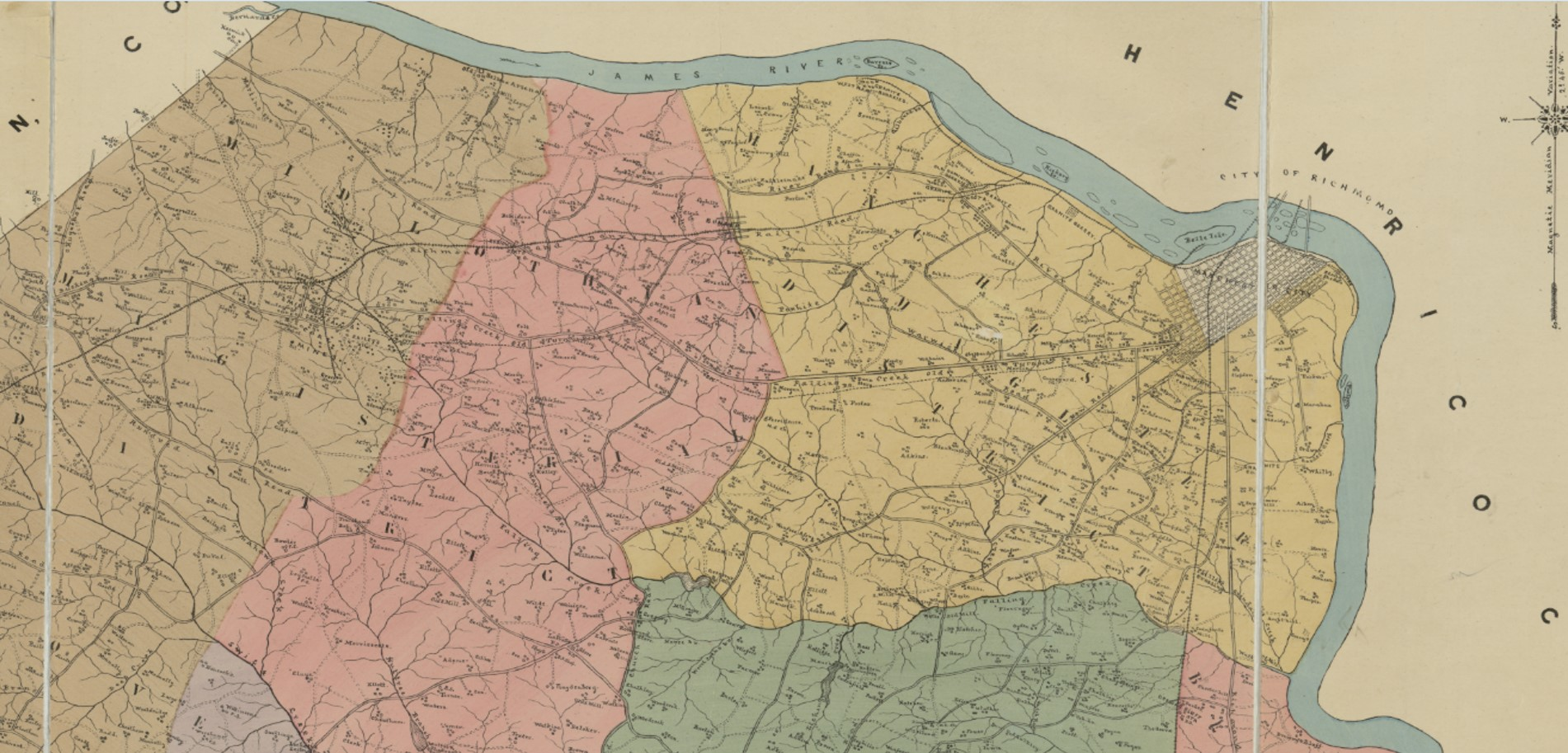
Before 1910, Chesterfield County was the municipal authority for most of what is today considered Southside. Before the Westham Bridge was built (near present day Huguenot Memorial Bridge in Bon Air) in 1911, Southsiders crossing the James River had to use a boat or travel to Manchester to cross a bridge.

=== Early settlements along the river ===
A primary feature defining the Southside of Richmond is the James River and the limited means to cross it to get to other parts of metro Richmond. The oldest bridge across the James River in Richmond was Mayo Bridge (1788). Before that, commerce was limited to individual enterprises passing their goods in boats, bateau, and ferries over the James River as well as to fixed port areas with tobacco inspection warehouses established north of the river at Shockoe's and south of the river at Warwick.

=== 1600s: Conflicts between English settlements and Native tribes ===
When the English arrived, there were two main groups of natives occupying Central Virginia, separated by the Fall Line of the James: (1) the Manakins controlled the southern Virginia Piedmont west of the fall line from Richmond to the Blue Ridge Mountains; and (2) the Powhatan Confederacy (led by leader named Wahunsonacock) who controlled land in the Richmond area below the Fall Line towards the Virginia Tidewater region.

The earliest European settlement in the Central Virginia area was in 1611 at Henricus, where the Falling Creek empties into the James River. In 1619, early Virginia Company settlers struggling to establish viable moneymaking industries established the Falling Creek Ironworks. Between 1622 and 1646, a series of generational Anglo-Powhatan Wars resulted in the death of Opchanacanough and the established boundaries on the Powhatan Confederacy. After Bacon's Rebellion in 1676, Cockacoeske signed the Treaty of 1677, and several central Virginia tribes accepted their de facto position as subjects of the British Crown, and gave up their remaining claims to their ancestral land, in return for protection from the remaining hostile tribes and a guarantee of a limited amount of reserved land. The Powhatan Confederacy effectively ended. By 1699, the Manakins/Monacans had abandoned their settlements, and English freely settled land claims in the entire Richmond area. In part to serve as a buffer, the English allotted a large portion of land for French Huguenot refugees to settle in the old Manakin village on the south side of the James River.

=== 1700s: Warwick and River Commerce ===
After completing prominent construction jobs at the state capitol in Williamsburg, Henry Cary built Ampthill plantation in 1730 near Warwick. From 1750 to 1781, his son Archibald operated Falling Creek Ironworks at Warwick. Owing to port traffic, Warwick Road became a major thoroughfare through Southside for the next two centuries, especially as it enabled passage around the falls at the James.

On the part of the James River west of the Fall Line, the descendants of the 1700 Huguenot refugee settlement in Manakintown began to intermingle with the English and settle across Powhatan and western Chesterfield county. They established family coal mining enterprises such as Black Heath. One of these Huguenot descendants, Abraham Salle, built Salisbury Plantation and, in 1777, sold it to the Randolph Family who lived across the river at Tuckahoe and used Salisbury as a hunting grounds. Patrick Henry rented Salisbury and lived there with his family during his second term as governor in 1786.

=== Early 1800s: The Rise of Manchester and Rail Lines to the Coal Mines ===
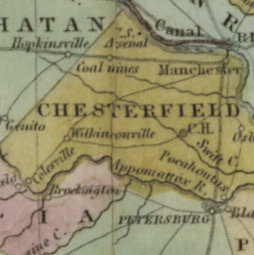
This 1834 maps depicts the Chesterfield Railroad rail line built in 1831 to transport coal from the coal mines in western Chesterfield County to the port of Manchester. The Richmond and Petersburg Railroad was built in 1838.

After the port of Warwick was destroyed by Benedict Arnold in the Revolutionary War, Warwick Road continued in use, but the port of Manchester took over Warwick's role as a major port. Further, water navigation to estates above the falls of the James River was enabled by the 1790 opening of the James River and Kanawha Canal that stretched from Richmond, Virginia to Westham, Virginia on the north side of the river and paralleling the James for 7 miles (11 km).

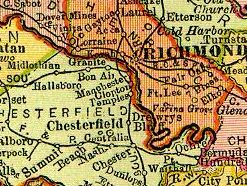
In 1895, Granite was located on the Southern Railway (formerly the Richmond and Danville Railroad) about 5 miles west of Manchester and 3 miles east of Bon Air in Chesterfield County, Virginia. Also shown is the East-West Brighthope Railway connecting Chester to Moseley.

In 1804, Virginia built the precursor to the Midlothian Turnpike from the port of Manchester headed westward to the mouth of the Falling Creek to access the coal mines at Midlothian. This enabled industrial sites such as the Black Heath coal mines and Bellona Arsenal to ship goods down the James river without having to go through Warwick.

Rail enabled the rapid export of coal from the coal mines in western Chesterfield County. The Clover Hill Railroad Company was chartered in 1841 by the Virginia General Assembly, enabling the Clover Hill Railroad to open in 1845 between Chester and the Clover Hill Pits near Winterpock.

== Late 1800s: Development along the rail lines ==
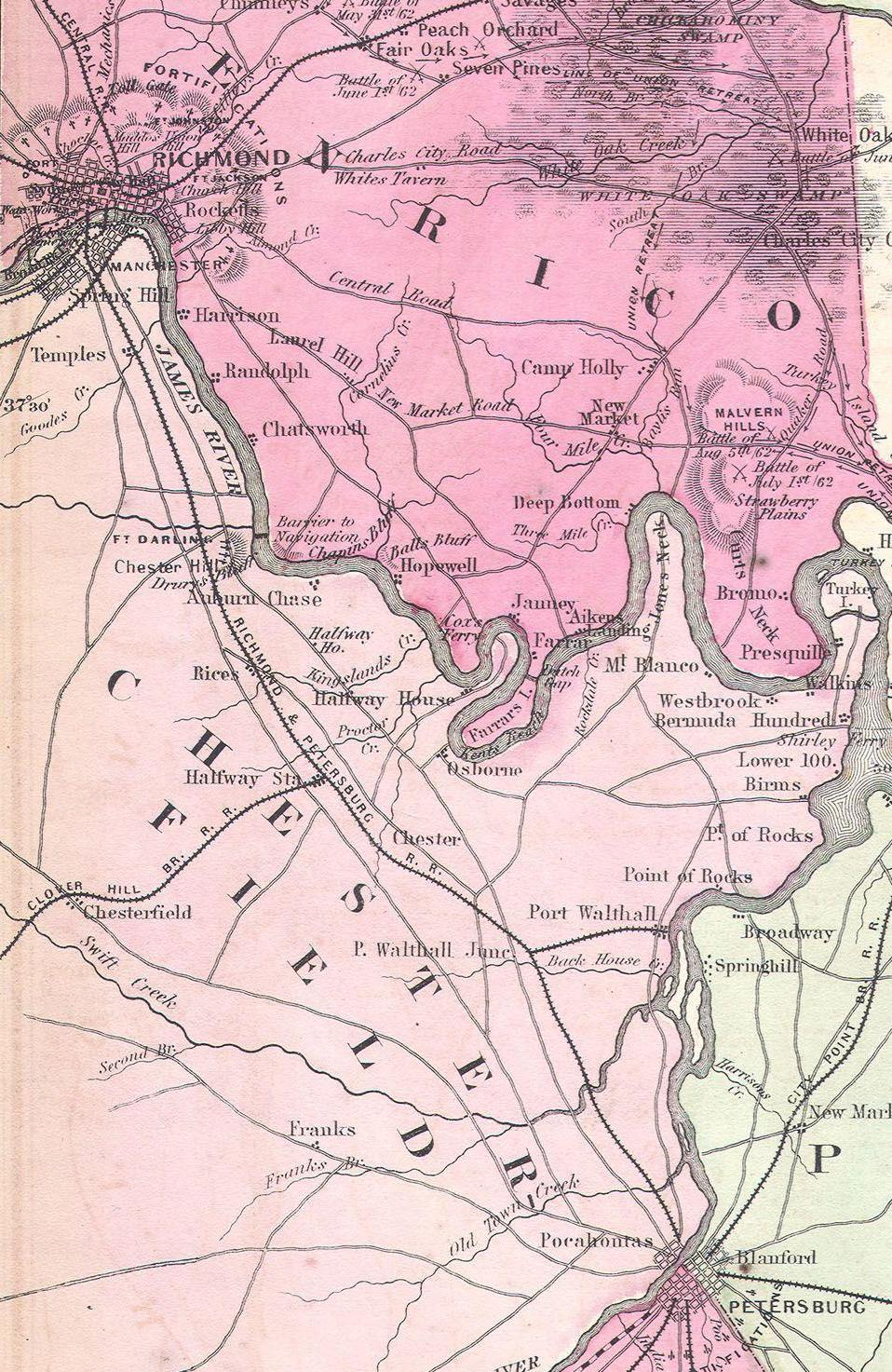
During the Civil War, the Confederacy was generally able to keep the Union troops east of the Richmond and Petersburg Railroad, with the main exception being the Bermuda Hundred Campaign of 1864.

During the Civil War, the Confederacy was generally able to keep the Union troops west of the Richmond and Petersburg Railroad, with the main exception being the Bermuda Hundred Campaign. Until the end of the war, Drewry's Bluff prevented the Union army from accessing Richmond over water.

While the Clover Hill Railroad went bankrupt in 1877, it was reconstituted in 1881 as the Brighthope Railway and operated until World War I when it was disassembled and sent to France for the World War I effort.

The city of Manchester rose to prominence through its 1831 Chesterfield Railroad and its 1853 successor the Richmond and Danville Railroad.

Suburban rail stations along the R&D led to development in Granite, Virginia (a mining quarry whose post office opened in 1872), Bon Air (the resort colony established 1877), Robious and Midlothian. These stops became industrial and residential centers in otherwise rural areas that often moved people and goods through Manchester and Richmond.

Manchester also benefited from being a station along the North-South Richmond and Petersburg Railroad. Manchester briefly served as the seat of Chesterfield County after the Civil War, from 1870 to 1876. In 1874, Manchester voted to become an independent City. In 1876, the Chesterfield County seat was moved to Chesterfield Courthouse.

=== 1900s: Development and Annexation in the Automobile Era ===
The slow decline of the Jeff Davis corridor began with the 1958 construction of the I-95 Richmond-Petersburg Turnpike, paralleling it approximately 1 mile to the east.

==== 1910 Annexation of Manchester ====
From its founding in 1750s to the late 19th century, Chesterfield County had been the municipal authority for all of what is today considered Southside. Manchester became an independent city in 1876 and then in 1910, Manchester agreed to be annexed by the City of Richmond. During annexation negotiation, Manchester demanded the condition that a free bridge be built to allow Manchesterians access to Richmond. This became known as the Manchester Bridge. Soon, as the automobile era began, other bridges were built to include Westham Bridge (1911), the Nickel Bridge (1925—a toll bridge) and the Lee Bridge (1933—also a toll bridge).

==== Automobile-based Development and 1942 Annexation of Jeff Davis Corridor ====
In 1922, Chesterfield annexed the Henricus site from Henrico County.

In 1927, after a decade of road improvements, the Jefferson Davis Highway officially opened as a major automobile thoroughfare.

These auto corridors attracted development. The DuPont Spruance plant opened in 1929 along the Jefferson Davis Highway and manufactured rayon, Cordura , and cellophane on the former site of the Ampthill Plantation.

Inter-state traffic along Jefferson Davis Highway and its James River toll bridge led to Belt Boulevard by 1933 that bypassed downtown and directed some traffic to the Nickel Bridge. This easier automobile access spurred development in Southside. By 1940, a Works Projects Administration guide to Virginia announced "South of Richmond U.S. 1 is lined with tourist cabins, garages, and lunchrooms swathed in neon lights that at night convert the road as far as Petersburg into a glittering midway."

During annexations in 1914 and 1942, Richmond appropriated more and more land from Chesterfield County to include Westover Hills and Forest Hill to the west, and The Port of Richmond (Built 1940) to the south.

==== Postwar growth: Bellwood, Southside Plaza, I-95 and Chippenham Pkwy ====
After WWII, Southside experienced a decade of massive growth. A large military supply center had been built for WWII in 1942 on the Bellwood property. The Bellwood Drive-In opened outside the city limits along the Jeff Davis corridor in 1948 and billed itself as the "largest and finest" drive-in theater in the South.

The Southside Plaza opened up in 1957-58 outside the city limits on Belt Boulevard in what was then Chesterfield County.

In 1958, after three years of construction, the limited access Richmond–Petersburg Turnpike tollway opened between Richmond and Petersburg. The Chippenham Parkway was built in 1967 and connected much of Southside from the Midlothian Turnpike to the Defense Supply Center, Richmond.

Prior to the construction of I-95, the Route 1/Jefferson Davis Highway corridor was the county’s main thoroughfare. I-95 and Chippenham Pkwy siphoned traffic off both the Jeff Davis Corridor and the Belt Boulevard.

==== 1970 Annexation of Midlo Tpke out to Chippenham Pkwy ====
During another annexation in 1970, Richmond took an additional 23 square miles from Chesterfield County all the way out to the Chippenham Parkway. The racial motivations behind this expansion led to a Supreme Court case City of Richmond v. United States and a moratorium on further annexations. As a part of the negotiations over the precise annexation, much of Bon Air to the west and the Ampthill property to the south (owned by DuPont) remained in Chesterfield County.

==== Powhite Parkway and Powhite Parkway Extension to outer beltway (288) ====
As suburban development progressed to the southwest along US-60, VA-76, and VA-150, the Southside Plaza (A) became overshadowed by Cloverleaf Mall (B) in 1972 and further eclipsed by the Chesterfield Mall (C) in 1978. In 1988 the Powhite Parkway Extension opened, enabling fast travel from the Chippenham Parkway out to the new Virginia State Route 288. The Stony Point Fashion Park (D) was built in 2003.

The Powhite Parkway opened in 1973, connecting downtown to the Chippenham Parkway. With newfound highway access, the Southside suburban population continued to explode. New shopping malls were built outside the city limits (Cloverleaf Mall in 1972 and Chesterfield Mall in 1978) as well as Brandermill residential development in 1977 along the Swift Creek Reservoir. Plans were drawn up to create a Powhite Parkway Extension that would extend the road from Chippenham out to Virginia State Route 288, which was completed in 1988. In 1973, Philip Morris USA opened a cigarette manufacturing plant along I-95 at Commerce Road. The McGuire VA Hospital opened in 1983.

=== 1988-2004: New bridges connect West End and Southside ===
Before 1988, the main way to get from the Southside to the West End was via the Huguenot Bridge or by crossing the James River inside the Richmond city limits. This led to a minor rivalry in the 1980s where the West End had a bumper sticker that said "West End -- For Members Only" and the Southside had a bumper sticker that said "South of the James -- By Invitation Only." This separation began to change as road infrastructure improved. In 1988, Southside was connected to Parham Road in the west end via a Chippenham extension and the new Edward E. Willey Bridge. In 1992, the state removed toll-booths on the I-95 Richmond–Petersburg Turnpike. In 1996, state leaders announced that the Chippenham Parkeway would be extended eastward in a bridge across the James river to enable faster access to Interstate 295 (Virginia) and the Richmond International Airport. The bridge and limited access toll highway opened in 2002 as Virginia State Route 895, aka the "Pocahontas Parkway."

=== Southside developments 2000 to present ===
In 2004, 288 was extended northwards from Brandermill through Powhatan and Goochland Counties, to cross the river at the World War II Veterans Memorial Bridge (Virginia) and complete the beltway around Richmond. This led to residential developments along a swath across Chesterfield County such as The Grove near Midlothian Mines Park, Winterfield, as well as a commercial development called Westchester Commons at Midlothian Turnpike and 288. Developments near Route 288 bridge include the Tarrington housing development near James River High School and the widening of the Robious Road Corridor.

Closer in towards Richmond, the Stony Point Fashion Park opened in 2003 (the same year as a similar outdoor mall concept called Short Pump Town Center opened in the West End of Richmond). Along the James River, Forest Hill Avenue has seen its own renaissance as some residents have preferred to stay in the city rather than move to the suburbs. Phenomena such as the South of the James farmer's market attract crowds every weekend in Forest Hill Park.

Farther west along the I-95 / Route 1 Corridor, city and county officials have contemplated how to revive the Jefferson Davis Corridor. While economically challenged, it has a robust immigrant population, particularly Latino. As Manchester has seen recent influx of historic tax credits used to redevelop old properties, the historically black Swansboro and Blackwell neighborhoods are now the subject of fierce debates about gentrification.

== Unincorporated towns and neighborhoods ==
- Adams Park
- Beaufont
- Bellemeade
- Belmont Woods
- Belt Center
- Blackwell
- Bon Air
- British Camp Farms
- Broad Rock
- Brookbury
- Brookhaven Farms
- Cedarhurst
- Cherry Gardens
- Chippenham Forest
- Cofer
- Cottrell Farms
- Cullenwood
- Davee Gardens
- Deerbourne
- Elkhardt
- Fawnbrook
- Forest Hill / Gravel Hill
- Forest Hill Park
- Forest Hill Terrace
- Forest View
- Granite
- Hickory Hill
- Hillside Court
- Hioaks
- Huguenot
- Jahnke
- Jeff Davis
- Old Town Manchester
- Maury
- McGuire
- McGuire Manor
- Meadowbrook
- Midlothian
- Murchies Mill
- Northrop
- Oak Grove
- Oxford
- Piney Knolls
- Pocoshock
- Powhite Park
- Reedy Creek
- Reservoir Heights
- South Garden
- Southampton
- Southwood
- Springhill
- Stony Point
- Stratford Hills
- Swansboro
- Swansboro West
- Swanson
- Walmsley
- Warwick
- Westlake Hills
- Westover
- Westover Hills
- Westover Hills West
- Willow Oaks
- Windsor
- Woodhaven
- Woodland Heights
- Worthington

== Industrial and commercial sites ==
- Defense Supply Center, Richmond (DSCR)
- Philip Morris USA manufacturing center
- Overnite Transportation (recently bought out by United Parcel Service)
- Deepwater Terminal (Port of Richmond)
- Chippenham Johnston Willis (CJW) Medical Center

== Commercial districts ==
- Stonebridge Shopping Center (formerly Cloverleaf Mall) and Spring Rock Green (Formerly Beaufont Plaza)
- Old Manchester
- Hull Street Corridor
- Midlothian Turnpike
- Westover Hills
- Stratford Hills
- Stony Point Fashion Park
- The Arboretum
- Bellwood flea market
- Bermuda Square
- Sycamore Square
- Oxbridge Square
- Chesterfield Meadows

== Parks and recreation ==
- James River Park System
- Forest Hill Park
- Canoe Run Park
- Powhite Park

== Transportation ==
=== Major streets and roads ===
- Interstate 95 (formerly Richmond-Petersburg Turnpike)
- Jefferson Davis Highway (U.S. Route 1 and U.S. Route 301)
- Forest Hill Avenue (short portion is U.S. Route 60)
- Semmes Avenue (U.S. Route 60)
- Belt Boulevard (State Route 161)
- Iron Bridge Road (State Route 10)
- Broad Rock Road (State Route 10)
- Huguenot Road (State Route 147)
- Courthouse Road (State Route 653)
- Hull Street (U.S. Route 360)
- Midlothian Turnpike (U.S. Route 60)
- Chippenham Parkway (State Route 150)
- Pocahontas Parkway (State Route 895)
- Powhite Parkway (State Route 76)
- State Route 288

=== Bridges over James River ===
- James River Bridge (Interstate 95)
- Mayo Bridge (U.S. Route 360)
- Manchester Bridge (U.S. Route 60)
- Robert E. Lee Memorial Bridge (U.S. Route 1 and U.S. Route 301)
- Boulevard Bridge (State Route 161)
- Powhite Parkway James River Bridge (State Route 76)
- Huguenot Memorial Bridge (State Route 147)
- Edward E. Willey Bridge (State Route 150)
- World War II Veterans Memorial Bridge (State Route 288)

== See also ==
- Neighborhoods of Richmond, Virginia
- Richmond, Virginia
- Manchester, Virginia
- Chesterfield Railroad
- Richmond and Danville Railroad
- Richmond and Petersburg Railroad
