= Parham Road =

Highway in Henrico County, Virginia

Route information
- Maintained by Henrico County and VDOT
- Length: 12.08 mi (19.44 km) SR 73 has a length of 0.78 miles (1.26 km) within Parham Road's course.

Major junctions
- West end: SR 150 in Tuckahoe
- SR 6 in Tuckahoe; I-64 near Tuckahoe; US 250 in Laurel; US 33 in Laurel; US 1 at Yellow Tavern; I-95 near Chamberlayne
- East end: US 301 / SR 2 in Chamberlayne

Location
- Country: United States
- State: Virginia
- Counties: Henrico

Highway system
- Virginia Routes; Interstate; US; Primary; Secondary; Byways; History; HOT lanes
← SR 72	→ SR 74

Parham Road is a circumferential highway in Henrico County in the U.S. state of Virginia. The highway runs 12.08 miles (19.44 km) from Virginia State Route 150 (SR 150) near Tuckahoe east to U.S. Route 301 (US 301) and SR 2 in Chamberlayne. Parham Road serves the northwestern suburbs of Richmond, including Tuckahoe, Laurel, and Chamberlayne. The four-lane divided highway intersects all of the major highways that extend northwest and north from the city, including Interstate 64 (I-64) and I-95. Parham Road is county maintained except for the portion that is State Route 73, a connector between US 1 and I-95. The Parham Road name was applied to a small portion of the current route by the early 20th century. SR 73 was constructed in the early 1960s. Most of Parham Road from SR 6 to US 1 was constructed as a new four-lane divided highway by Henrico County in the late 1960s; the existing sections were upgraded at the same time. The highway was extended east to its present terminus in the late 1970s. Parham Road was completed south to its present western terminus in 1990 concurrent with the extension of SR 150 across the James River from the Southside of Richmond to Henrico County.

== Route description ==
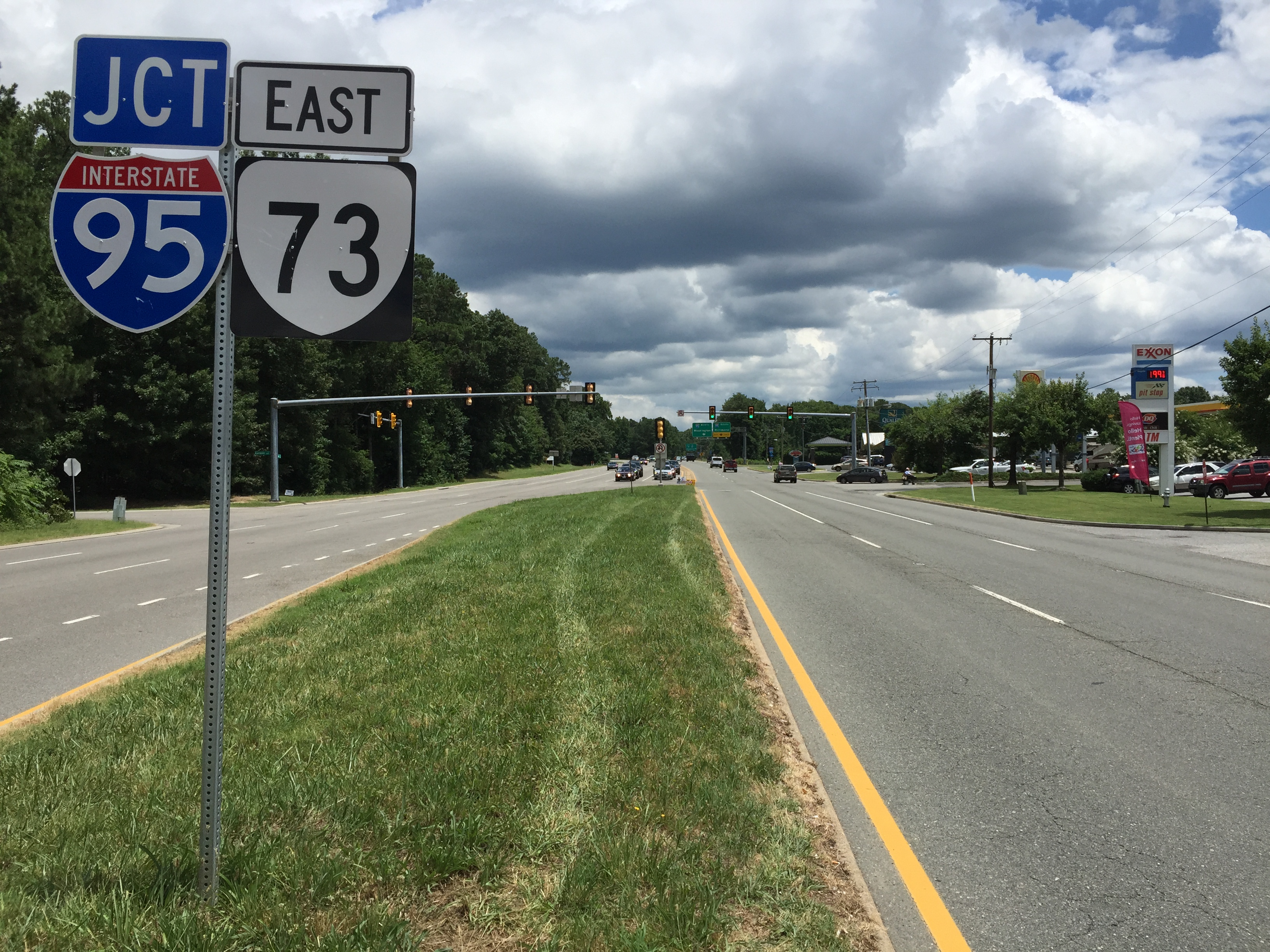
View east along the SR 73 section of Parham Road near Chamberlayne

Parham Road begins at the northern terminus of SR 150 (Chippenham Parkway) at an intersection with a connector to River Road, which crosses over SR 150 just south of the intersection. SR 150 heads south across the James River into Chesterfield County and serves the portion of Richmond south of the river. Parham Road heads north as a four-lane divided highway through the unincorporated area of Tuckahoe, where the highway intersects SR 6 (Patterson Avenue). The highway has a direct northbound ramp to Regency Square shopping mall just south of its intersection with Eastridge Road and Quioccasin Road. North of Three Chopt Road, Parham Road begins to curve to the east and meets I-64 at a six-ramp partial cloverleaf interchange. In the suburb of Laurel, the highway intersects US 250 (Broad Street) and Hungary Spring Road, east of which the highway passes the Henrico County Government Center, including the county courthouse.

Parham Road continues east, intersects US 33 (Staples Mill Road), and crosses over CSX's RF&P Subdivision rail line a short distance north of Amtrak's Richmond Staples Mill Road station. The highway intersects Woodman Road and passes by the Parham Road campus of J. Sargeant Reynolds Community College. The county highway becomes a state highway, SR 73, at US 1 (Brook Road) at Yellow Tavern, the site of an 1864 Civil War battle. Parham Road briefly expands to six lanes along its SR 73 section before the state designation ends at an asymmetrical cloverleaf interchange with I-95. Parham Road continues northeast along the northern edge of the suburb of Chamberlayne before curving south to its eastern terminus at US 301 and SR 2 (Chamberlayne Avenue) just west of the Chickahominy River, which forms the Henrico–Hanover county line, and those highways' interchange with I-295 in the adjacent county.

Parham Road is maintained by the Henrico County Department of Public Works except for the SR 73 segment, which as a state highway is maintained by the Virginia Department of Transportation. Parham Road is a part of the main National Highway System from its western terminus to I-95.

== History ==
Parham Road is named for Junius S. Parham, a Tennessee resident whose only connection to Henrico County is his acquisition of land known as the Parham tract through his marriage to Mary E. Smith in the mid-19th century. Between 1860 and 1879, Parham gradually sold off sections of this track along the eastern side of what was then known as New County Road, which extended from Three Chopt Road to Broad Street Road and was named for Parham by 1900. By 1958, Parham Road covered the same length as it had since 1900, although a portion of Ridge Road from south of SR 6 to south of Quioccasin Road followed the highway's current course. That same year, the Commonwealth Transportation Board deemed it necessary for there to be a connecting road in the primary highway system between US 1 and the proposed I-95; the proposed connector was designated SR 73. The Board approved funding for the highway, then named the Dover Street Connection, in 1959. SR 73 was completed in 1962 with a trumpet interchange at I-95.

By 1964, Henrico County was planning a circumferential highway in the western part of the county, and county officials requested state aid for the new Parham Road circumferential. Construction of the new Parham Road began between 1965 and 1967 and was completed in 1968. The work consisted of new construction from just south of Quioccasin Road to the intersection of Three Chopt Road and existing Parham Road and from just west of US 250 to the intersection of US 1 and SR 73. Existing Parham Road was expanded from Three Chopt Road to US 250; in addition, Ridge Road was expanded from the present Ridge Road–Parham Road intersection south of SR 6 to Quioccasin Road. Parham Road was extended south as a two-lane road from Ridge Road to River Road by 1971. On the opposite end of the highway, the highway was extended east from I-95 to US 301 and SR 2 and the I-95 interchange was expanded to a full cloverleaf in 1978. The Chippenham–Parham Connector was proposed as early as 1972. Its course from Forest Hill Avenue south of the James River to Parham Road at Ridge Road was approved in 1984; the section from River Road to the southern end of the four-lane portion of Parham Road would be constructed by Henrico County. The cross-James portion of SR 150 and the four-lane connecting portion of Parham Road were completed in 1990.

== Major intersections ==
The entire route is in Henrico County.

Location	mi	km	Destinations	Notes
Tuckahoe	0.00	0.00	SR 150 south (Chippenham Parkway) / River Road	Western terminus of Parham Road; northern terminus of SR 150; intersection with connector to River Road
Tuckahoe	1.91	3.07	SR 6 (Patterson Avenue)	
Tuckahoe	4.04	6.50	I-64 – Richmond, Charlottesville	I-64 exit 181
Laurel	5.26	8.47	US 250 (Broad Street)	
Laurel	6.83	10.99	US 33 (Staples Mill Road)	
Yellow Tavern	9.82	15.80	US 1 (Brook Road)	Western terminus of SR 73
Chamberlayne	10.60	17.06	I-95 – Richmond, Washington	I-95 exit 83; eastern terminus of SR 73
Chamberlayne	12.08	19.44	US 301 / SR 2 (Chamberlayne Road) to I-295	Eastern terminus of Parham Road
1.000 mi = 1.609 km; 1.000 km = 0.621 mi: Route transition
