= Warwick Road (Chesterfield County) =

Warwick Road in Chesterfield County, Virginia, was one of the older roadways in the area extending across the northern section of the county. Established in the 18th century in the Virginia Colony, the Warwick Road effectively provided a portage around the portion of the James River containing dams and rapids near the fall line in the area of the towns of Manchester and Richmond, Virginia, which were located along the south and north banks of the river respectively.

== Historical path from 18th-century port town ==
Warwick Road originated at its namesake, the former 18th century port town of Warwick which was located near the confluence of Falling Creek and the James River. Established around 1750 by Archibald Cary, Warwick was destroyed in 1781 by British General Benedict Arnold's troops during the American Revolutionary War.

The 18th-century roadway called "The Warwick Road" led through what is now the large DuPont Plant in Chesterfield County, crossed into areas of Chesterfield annexed by Richmond in 1944 and 1970 which are now part of South Richmond and returned into Chesterfield County in what is now the Bon Air, Virginia area. There, it intersected what was called the River Road, which ran closely along the south bank in a westerly direction. The Warwick Road and the River Road in combination formed a portage from the deep-water tidal James River around the falls, rapids, and dams near Manchester and Richmond to the river west of there, where it is more shallow. The upper James River was navigable with craft such as bateau boats for many miles to the west.

== 20th century ==
Although apparently not used for portage purposes after the destruction of Warwick in 1781, much of the original Warwick Road remained intact as a through route until around 1960 when Chippenham Parkway was built and severed it between Jahnke Road and Midlothian Turnpike near Bon Air. However, portions of the old pathway remain in use in 2007. From east to west, these include sections of modern Walmsley Boulevard, Warwick Road, and Old Warwick Road in South Richmond, and Brown Road and Belleau Drive in Chesterfield County.

Portions of Warwick Road were hard-surfaced after it became part of Virginia's Secondary Road System under the Byrd Road Act in 1932. During second half of the 20th century, portions of Warwick Road east of Chippenham Parkway became hazardous as the area became heavily developed with housing subdivisions and suburban growth, and the traffic volume increased greatly on the two-laned curving roadway, which had no shoulders and deep ditches along the narrow right-of-way which had been established many years before the invention of the automobile. Warwick Road became notorious for many fatal automobile crashes.

== Newer connector road in South Richmond ==
In the 1990s, a newer 4.5-mile-long four-lane connector route was built in the annexed area of the City of Richmond at a cost of $41 million US with funding from the Virginia Department of Transportation. It was built partially along the some sections of the original Warwick Road, and followed the alignment generally.

The connector route, most of which was assigned the historic name of Warwick Road, extends from the intersection of Bells Road and Belt Boulevard (State Route 161 across the CSX A-line (the former Atlantic Coast Line Railroad Richmond-Florida main line) via a new bridge through major intersections with Broad Rock Boulevard (State Route 10), Hull Street Road (U.S. Route 360} to an intersection with Midlothian Turnpike, which carries U.S. Route 60.

Several bypassed sections of the older roadway were renamed "Old Warwick Road".

== See also ==
- Warwick, Virginia (Chesterfield County)
- Falling Creek Ironworks
