= Warwick, Virginia (Chesterfield County) =

Unincorporated town and port in Chesterfield County, Virginia, United States

Coordinates: 37°27′33″N 77°25′22″W

Warwick was an unincorporated town and port in Chesterfield County, Virginia, located on the navigable portion of the James River about 5 miles south of downtown Richmond, Virginia (and east of the Fall Line). Due to a sandbar in the river, although the falls did not begin until the river reached Richmond and Manchester, Warwick was as far upriver as many ships of the day could safely navigate. Regarding navigation on the James River, in his Notes on the State of Virginia, written in 1781–82, then-Governor Thomas Jefferson stated "Vessels of 250 tons may go to Warwick"

In 1619, Falling Creek Ironworks was established in the Virginia Colony near the future site of Warwick. The first in what became the United States, the facilities were destroyed and most of the colonists there killed during the Indian massacre of 1622 on Good Friday, March 22, 1622.

Warwick, just west of where a local tributary, Falling Creek, has its confluence with the river, was in existence from 1730 to 1781. It was an important port and manufacturing center. During the American Revolutionary War, Warwick's craftsmen turned out clothing and shoes, and its mills ground flour and meal for the Continental troops stationed at Chesterfield Courthouse. It was also an important center for manufacturing of naval equipment for Virginia's Continental Navy fleet. On April 30, 1781, General Benedict Arnold's British troops burned the town, destroying ships, warehouses, mills, tannery storehouses, and ropewalks. The town of Warwick no longer exists, but its place in history is noted on a Virginia Historical Marker nearby.

In modern times, the Port of Richmond's facility known locally as Richmond Deepwater Terminal includes part of the former site of Warwick.

== Warwick Road ==
Portions of the original Warwick Road extended from the port town of Warwick through Colonel Archibald Cary's Ampthill Plantation (which is now part of the large DuPont Plant), annexed areas of Chesterfield which are now part of South Richmond, and back into Chesterfield County to reach the Bon Air area. Much of the original Warwick Road was intact as a through route until around 1960.

== See also ==
- List of ghost towns in Virginia
