= Virginia State Route 150 =

State highway in Virginia, United States

State Route 150
- Chippenham Parkway

Route information
- Maintained by VDOT
- Length: 15.19 mi (24.45 km)
- Existed: 1967–present

Major junctions
- South end: I-95 / SR 895 in Bensley
- US 1 / US 301 in Bensley; SR 10 in Meadowbrook; US 360 near Belmont; US 60 near Bon Air; SR 76 near Bon Air; SR 147 in Richmond
- North end: Parham Road / River Road near Tuckahoe

Location
- Country: United States
- State: Virginia
- Counties: Chesterfield, City of Richmond, Henrico

Highway system
- Virginia Routes; Interstate; US; Primary; Secondary; Byways; History; HOT lanes
← SR 149	→ SR 151

State Route 150 (SR 150) is a state highway in the U.S. state of Virginia. Known as Chippenham Parkway, the state highway runs 15.19 miles (24.45 km) from Interstate 95 (I-95) and SR 895 in Bensley north to Parham Road and River Road near Tuckahoe in Henrico County. SR 150 is a four- to six-lane circumferential highway that connects the Chesterfield County suburbs of Richmond with western Henrico County and, via SR 895, eastern Henrico County and Richmond International Airport. The highway is a freeway except for a short stretch east of SR 147 in Richmond. SR 150 has junctions with all of the radial highways south of the James River, including I-95, U.S. Route 1 (US 1), US 301, US 360, US 60, and SR 76.

== Route description ==
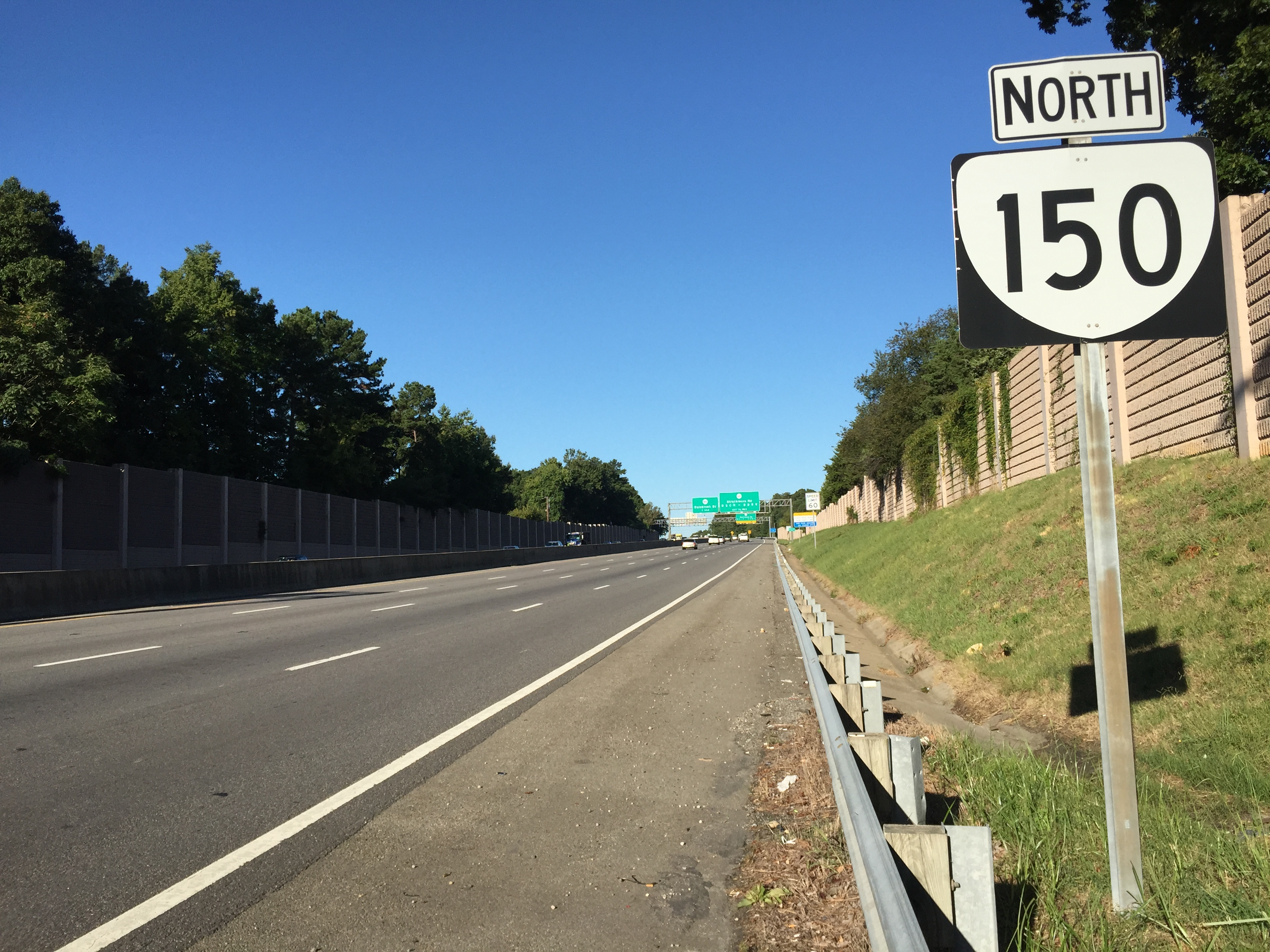
View north along SR 150 at US 1/US 301 in Bensley

SR 150 begins at an interchange with I-95 (Richmond–Petersburg Turnpike) and SR 895 (Pocahontas Parkway) in Bensley in eastern Chesterfield County. The interchange has two parts: SR 150 proper has a standard semi-directional three-way interchange with I-95. West of where the ramps from I-95 come together, the center four lanes of SR 150 continue east as SR 895, which crosses the James River on the Vietnam Veterans Memorial Bridge. SR 895 has three ramps of its own with I-95, all of them long and towering due to the bridge's height, necessary because the river is just east of I-95 at this point and is navigable. The ramps between I-95 and SR 150 and SR 895 merge as the freeway crosses CSX's Bellwood Subdivision. SR 150 heads west as a six-lane freeway that has a cloverleaf interchange with US 1 and US 301, which follow Jefferson Davis Highway.

West of the U.S. Highways, SR 150 crosses Falling Creek and has a pair of right-in/right-out interchanges with SR 1607 (Strathmore Road), which leads to Defense Supply Center, Richmond and the Aviation branch of the Defense Logistics Agency. The state highway crosses over SR 1607 and CSX's North End Subdivision and has another pair of right-in/right-out interchanges with SR 1601 (Dalebrook Drive), a discontinuous street within a pair of residential subdivisions. SR 150 curves northwest as it passes through its diamond interchange with SR 637 (Hopkins Road) in Meadowbrook. The state highway has a cloverleaf interchange with SR 10 (Iron Bridge Road) then crosses Falling Creek again and follows Pocoshock Creek through a partial cloverleaf interchange with SR 651 (Belmont Road) near Belmont.

North of SR 651, SR 150 forms the boundary between the independent city of Richmond and Chesterfield County. The state highway heads north through a partial cloverleaf interchange with US 360 (Hull Street Road) and a cloverleaf interchange with US 60 (Midlothian Turnpike) as the highway passes along the eastern edge of the suburb of Bon Air. SR 150 has partial cloverleaf interchanges with SR 686 (Jahnke Road) and SR 76 (Powhite Parkway), a toll radial freeway, next to Powhite Park. There is no direct access from northbound SR 150 to southbound SR 76 or from northbound SR 76 to southbound SR 150; those movements require using SR 686. The state highway continues north as a four-lane freeway that enters the city of Richmond at its crossing of Norfolk Southern Railway's Richmond District. SR 150 has a partial cloverleaf interchange with Forest Hill Avenue, then veers west and passes through several at-grade intersections in the Southampton Hills neighborhood of Richmond.

SR 150 becomes a freeway again at its partial cloverleaf interchange with SR 147 (Huguenot Road). The state highway's next two interchanges are with Stony Point Parkway and provide access to the Stony Point Fashion Park shopping center. The first interchange is a partial cloverleaf interchange; the second is a right-in/right-out interchange for southbound traffic. North of the Stony Point complex, SR 150 crosses the James River, CSX's Rivanna Subdivision, and the defunct James River and Kanawha Canal on a gradual S-curve via the Edward E. Willey Bridge just east of Bosher Dam. The state highway passes under River Road before reaching its northern terminus at an at-grade intersection with a connector road to River Road. The highway continues north as Parham Road, the primary circumferential arterial highway of Henrico County.

== Exit list ==
County	Location	mi	km	Destinations	Notes
Chesterfield	Bensley	0.00	0.00	I-95 / SR 895 east to I-295 – Richmond, Petersburg, Richmond International Airport	Exit 67 (I-95); southern terminus; western terminus of SR 895
Chesterfield	Bensley	1.35	2.17	US 1 / US 301 (Jefferson Davis Highway) – Petersburg, Richmond	
Chesterfield	Bensley			SR 1607 (Strathmore Road) – DSCR, DDRV	
Chesterfield	Meadowbrook			SR 1601 (Dalebrook Drive)	Right-in/right-out intersection; no access across SR 150
Chesterfield	Meadowbrook	3.32	5.34	SR 637 (Hopkins Road)	
Chesterfield	Meadowbrook	4.26	6.86	SR 10 (Iron Bridge Road) – Chesterfield, Richmond	
Chesterfield	Belmont	5.32	8.56	SR 651 (Belmont Road)	
Chesterfield		6.85	11.02	US 360 (Hull Street Road) – Amelia, Richmond	
Chesterfield		8.52	13.71	US 60 (Midlothian Turnpike) – Midlothian, Richmond	
Chesterfield		9.59	15.43	SR 686 (Jahnke Road) to SR 76 south	
Chesterfield	Bon Air	10.61	17.08	SR 76 (Powhite Parkway)	No direct access from SR 150 north to SR 76 south or SR 76 north to SR 150 south
City of Richmond		11.07	17.82	Forest Hill Avenue	interchange; north end of freeway; former SR 417
City of Richmond		12.56	20.21	SR 147 (Huguenot Road)	interchange; south end of freeway
City of Richmond				Stony Point Parkway – Stony Point Fashion Park	
City of Richmond				Stony Point Parkway – Stony Point Fashion Park	southbound access only
James River		14.07	22.64	Edward E. Willey Bridge	
Henrico	Tuckahoe	15.19	24.45	North Parham Road / River Road	interchange; northern terminus; north end of freeway
1.000 mi = 1.609 km; 1.000 km = 0.621 mi
