= Richard Randolph =

Colonial American politician (1691–1749)

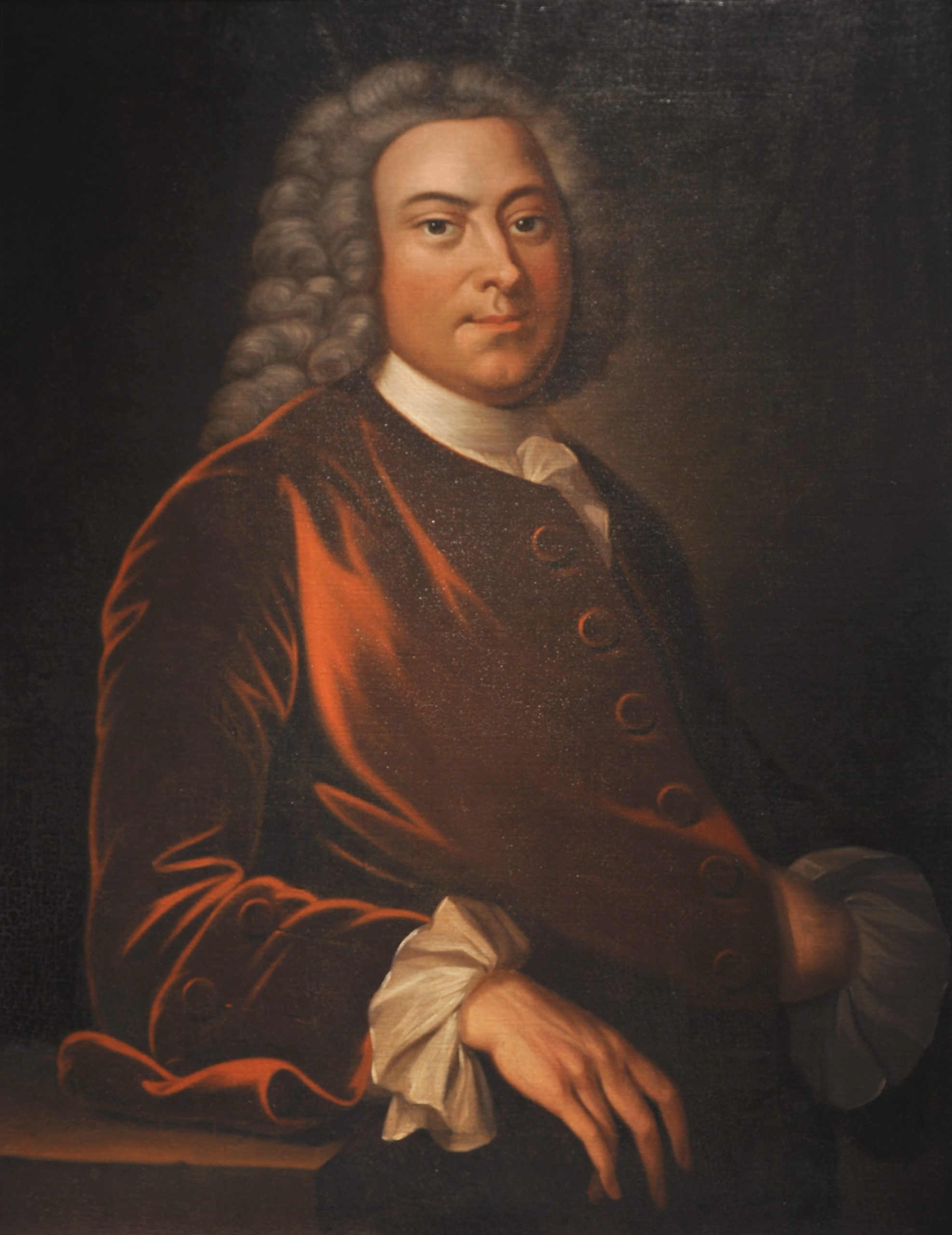

Member of the Virginia House of Burgesses
- In office 1727–1749

Personal details
- Born: c. 1691 Turkey Island Plantation, Henrico County, Virginia
- Died: 17 December 1748 (aged c. 57) Bath, Somerset, England
- Spouse: Jane Bolling (m. 1724)
- Children: 7
- Parent(s): William Randolph; Mary Isham

Richard Randolph (c.1691 – 1749), (Note: According to Page and Glenn, Richard Randolph was born on or "about May, 1686," but their sources are highly suspect. The best available records pinpoint his birth about 1691. According to Tyler, Randolph died in 1749. Robert Isham Randolph indicates that he lived from 1690–1742, however, this date of death contradicts the information provided by Tyler showing Randolph serving in the House of Burgesses after 1742.) also known as Richard Randolph of Curles, was a planter, merchant and politician in colonial Virginia. Richard served as a member of the Virginia House of Burgesses from 1727 until his death. Randolph was the fifth son of William Randolph and Mary Isham, as well as the grandfather of John Randolph of Roanoke. He was also recommended for appointment to the Governor's Council of Virginia four times but never received an appointment and through his marriage to Jane Bolling, his children were lineal descendants of Pocahontas.

== Biography and family ==
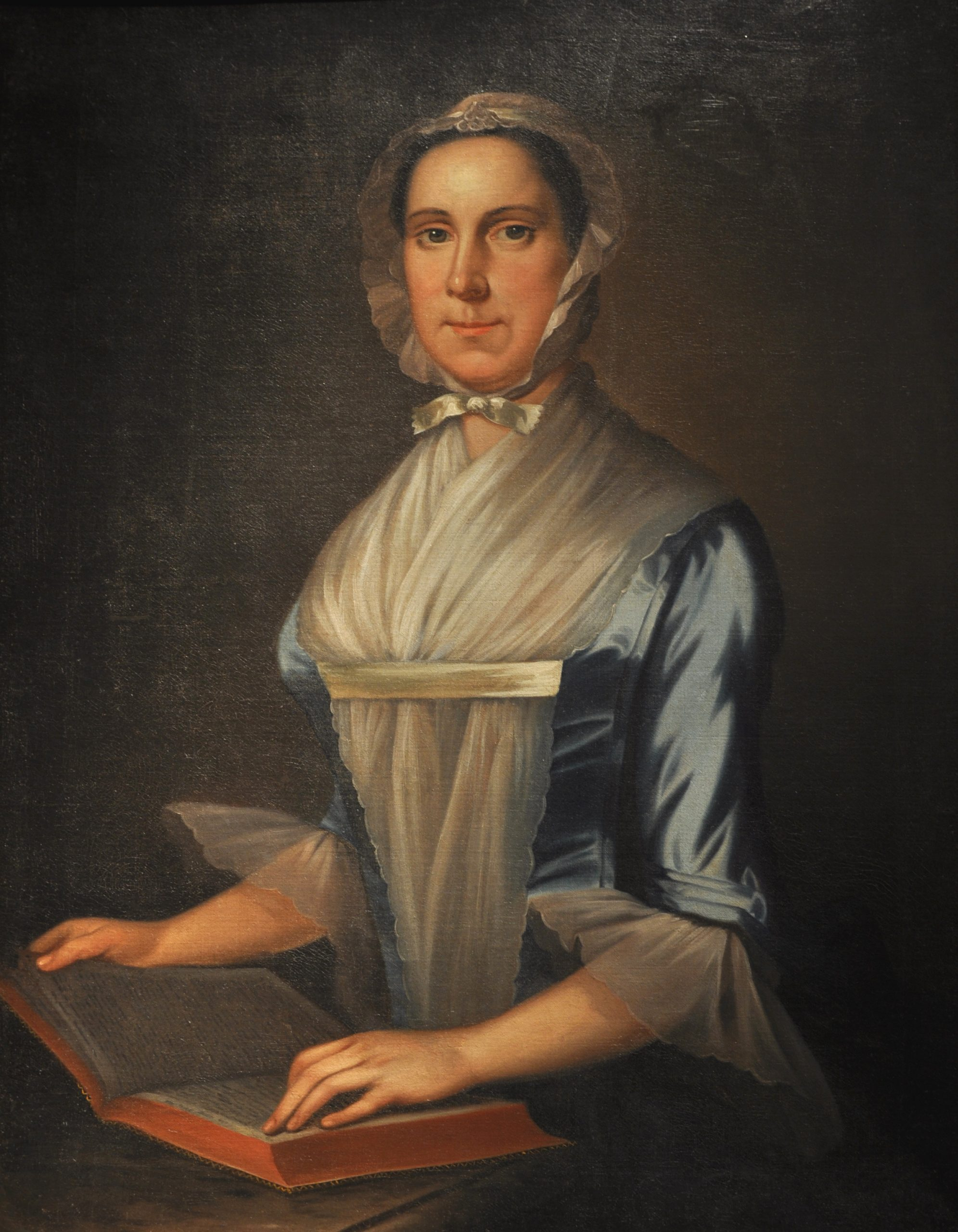
Jane Bolling Randolph

Coat of Arms of William Randolph

Randolph was born on the Turkey Island Plantation along the James River in Henrico County, Virginia around 1691. He married Jane Bolling (1703–1766), John Bolling's daughter, in 1724 and the couple had seven children who reached adulthood: (Note: Richard Randolph had at least two other children who died young; John Randolph was his sixth child.)

- Richard Randolph II (born c.1725), a slave trader and planter-merchant, married Anne Meade, the daughter of David Meade of Nansemond and had ten children. One child, Susanna, married Benjamin Harrison VI, son of Benjamin Harrison V, signer of the Declaration of Independence.
- Mary Randolph (born ~1727) married Archibald Cary on May 31, 1744.
- Jane Bolling Randolph (born ~1729) married Anthony Walke around 1750.
- Brett Randolph (born 1732) married Mary Scott.
- Ryland Randolph (1738–1784)
- John Randolph of Mattoax (born ~1737) married Frances Bland around 1769 and had four children, including Congressman John Randolph of Roanoke.
- Elizabeth Randolph married Richard Kidder Meade.

Randolph inherited the Curles Neck Plantation that adjoined the Turkey Island Plantation.

He was a great-uncle of United States President Thomas Jefferson.

John Bolling Jr.'s grandson, Colonel William Bolling married Richard Randolph II's daughter, Mary (1775–1863) on February 24, 1798.

Richard II and Anne/Nancy Meade's son, Richard III married Maria Beverley (1764–1824) of Blandfield on December 1, 1785. Her parents were Robert Beverley and Maria Carter (Landon Carter's daughter). Robert was Colonel William Beverley (1696–1756) and Elizabeth Bland's son.

Richard III's brother, Brett (1766–1828) married Maria's sister, Lucy (1771–1854) on November 21, 1789. They had eleven children, one son died as an infant. All of them moved to Oakleigh, Greensboro, Alabama. One of their children, Edward Brett Randolph (1792–1848) married Carter Beverley and Jane (née Wormeley) Beverley's daughter Elizabeth Bland Beverley (1804–1880). Edward Brett died at The Cedars in Columbus, Mississippi. They had an only child, a daughter, Virginia Beverley Randolph (1827–1865). Virginia married in 1850 George Wisner Sherman (1817–1865) from Burnt Hills, New York. They had Edward Randolph, Hugh Sutherland, George Wormeley, Beverley, and Virginia Randolph.

Brett and Lucy's son, Robert Carter Randolph married his cousin, Anne Tayloe Beverley (1808–1889) on June 12, 1826, in Mississippi. She was Robert Beverley and Maria Carter's granddaughter. Her interment was at Oakwood Cemetery in Sheffield, Alabama.

Brett's sister, Jane Randolph married John Bolling III's son, Archibald in 1774. They had a few children.

Richard Randolph III and Maria Beverley's son, Robert Beverley Randolph (1790–1869) married Eglantine Maria Beverley (1808–1886) on March 23, 1834. They resided in Washington, D.C. Her parents were Peter Randolph Beverley and Lovely St Martin (1790–1867).

== Ancestry ==
Ancestors of Richard Randolph

16. Robert Randolph
8. William Randolph
17. Rosa Roberts
4. Richard Randolph
18. Richard Lane
9. Dorothy Lane
19. Elizabeth Vincent
2. William Randolph
20. John Rilande
10. Richard Ryland
21. Maria Canning
5. Elizabeth Ryland
11. Elizabeth Harward
1. Richard Randolph
24. Sir Euseby Isham
12. William Isham
25. Anne Borlase
6. Henry Isham
26. William Brett
13. Mary Brett
27. Mary Toddington
3. Mary Isham
28. Christopher Banks
14. Christopher Banks
29. Alice Foxe
7. Catherine Banks
30. John Royall
15. Janet Royall
31. Angeline

== See also ==
- First Families of Virginia
- Randolph family of Virginia
