= Falling Creek (James River tributary) =

Creek in Midlothian, Virginia

Coordinates: 37.4364°N 77.4277°W

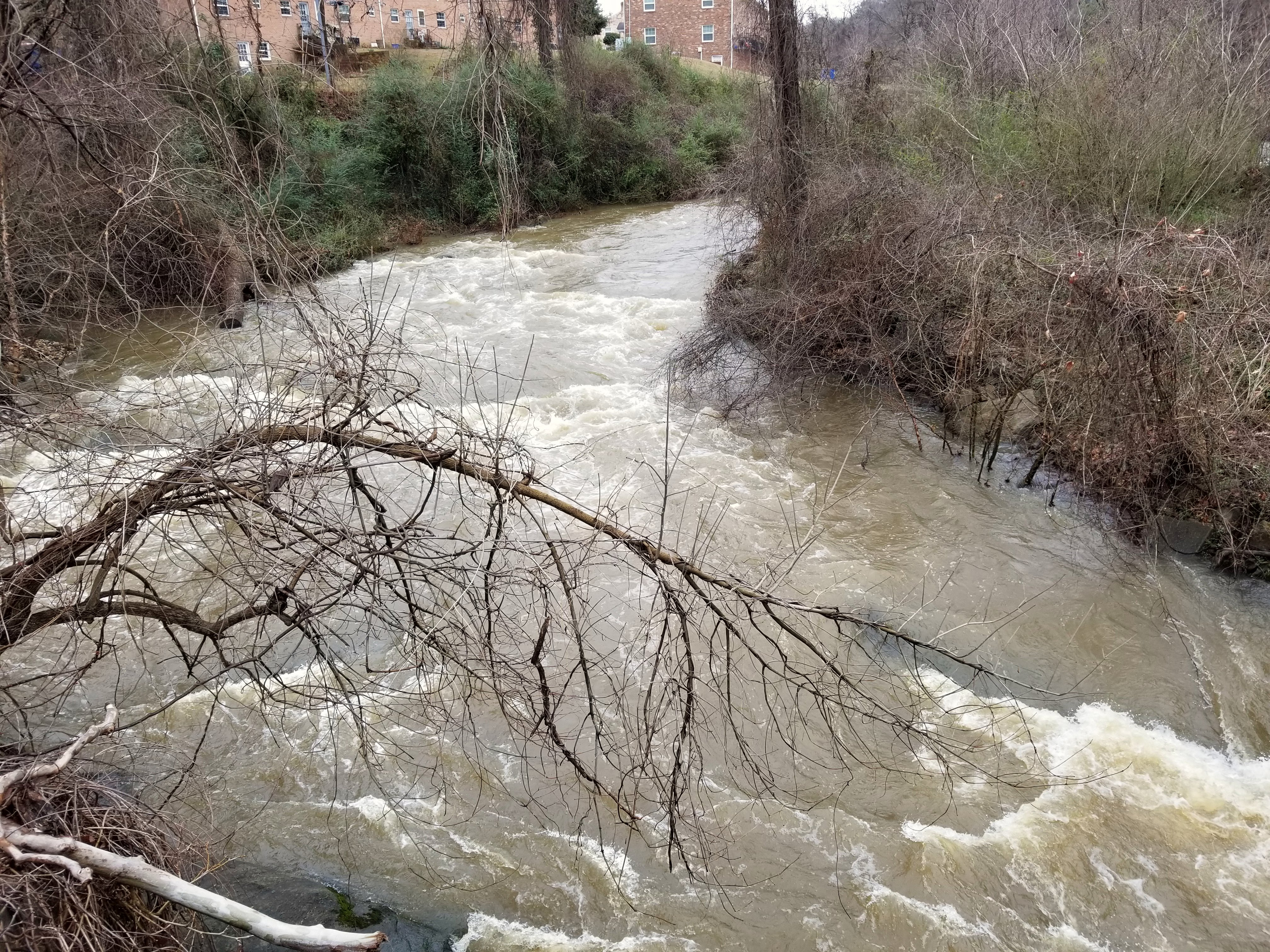
A swollen Falling Creek

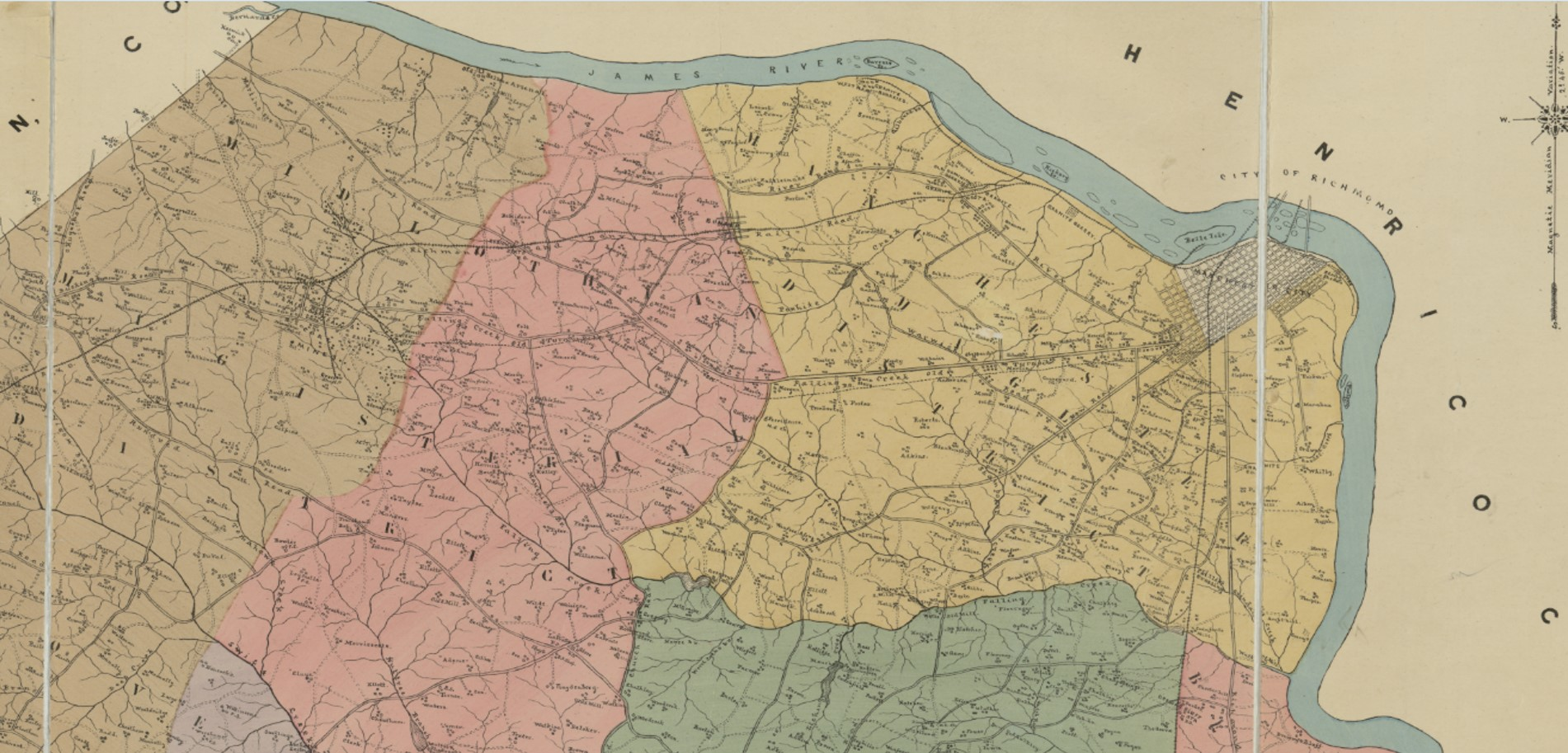
This 1888 map of Chesterfield County shows how Falling Creek rises in the Salisbury section of northwestern Chesterfield County (near the Midlothian coal mines) and flows through Southside Richmond to the James River.

Falling Creek is a tributary of the James River located near Richmond, Virginia, United States. Approximately 23 miles (37 km) in length, it varies in width between 10 feet (3.0 m) at its source to several hundred feet in the Falling Creek Reservoir. Falling Creek rises in the Salisbury section of northwestern Chesterfield County, flows through Southside Richmond and empties into the James River roughly one mile south of the Richmond city limits. A dam located in the Meadowbrook section of the county at Hopkins Road forms the Falling Creek Reservoir, formerly used as northern Chesterfield's drinking water supply.

== Historical notes ==
- In 1619, Falling Creek Ironworks (located just east of the modern-day Jefferson Davis Highway) became the first iron furnace in North America. The site is now part of a park owned by Chesterfield County.
- In 1621, Falling Creek was the site of the first lead mines in North America.
- From 1750-1781, the port town of Warwick was located at the confluence of Falling Creek with the James River. During this period it was also the site of Chesterfield or Cary's Forge. This was a finery forge used to convert high carbon pig iron to low carbon iron which was built and operated by Archibald Cary of Ampthill Plantation. On April 30, 1781, General Benedict Arnold's British troops burned the town, destroying ships, warehouses, mills, tannery storehouses, and ropewalks. The Lost Town of Warwick no longer exists, but its place in history is noted on a Virginia Historical Marker nearby. The area where Warwick was located is occupied by the Spruance Plant and related industrial complex of the DuPont Company.
- Midlothian area coal mines of the Richmond Basin were located along Falling Creek near the point of origin. From a point there in the valley created by on Falling Creek, the Chesterfield Railroad, the first railroad in Virginia, was built beginning in the late 1820s to transport the product to port at the Town of Manchester (which later became South Richmond).

== See also ==
- List of rivers of Virginia
