= Deepwater Terminal Railroad =

Defunct Virginia railroad

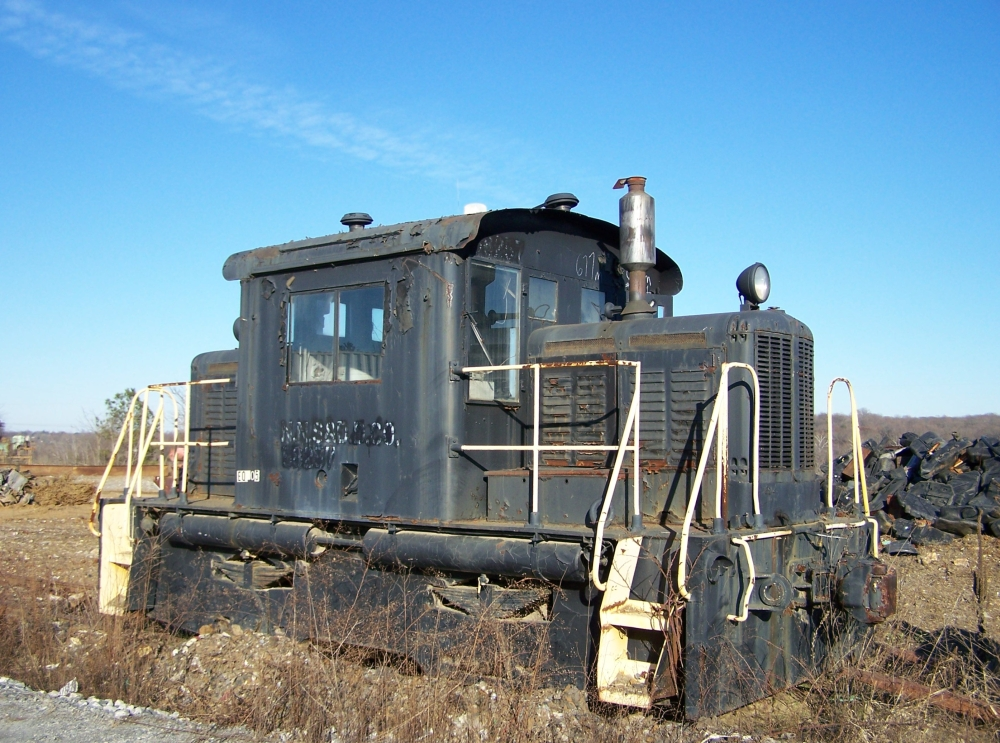
A Whitcomb 45-Ton center cab on the Deepwater Terminal Railroad in Richmond, VA, still sees use today at Sims Metal America.

The Deepwater Terminal Railroad was a 4.5 mile terminal railroad off the Seaboard Air Line Railroad in Richmond, Virginia. The line was used to service Port of Richmond. The U.S. Army Corps of Engineers oversaw and operated the Deepwater Terminal Railroad. There were many industries along the line including Peck Recycling, some storage facilities, and the Port of Richmond or Deepwater Terminal. Today the line is still in use by CSX Transportation to access the port and Sims Metals.
