= The Cedars (Columbus, Mississippi) =

Historic house in Mississippi, United States

- U.S. National Register of Historic Places
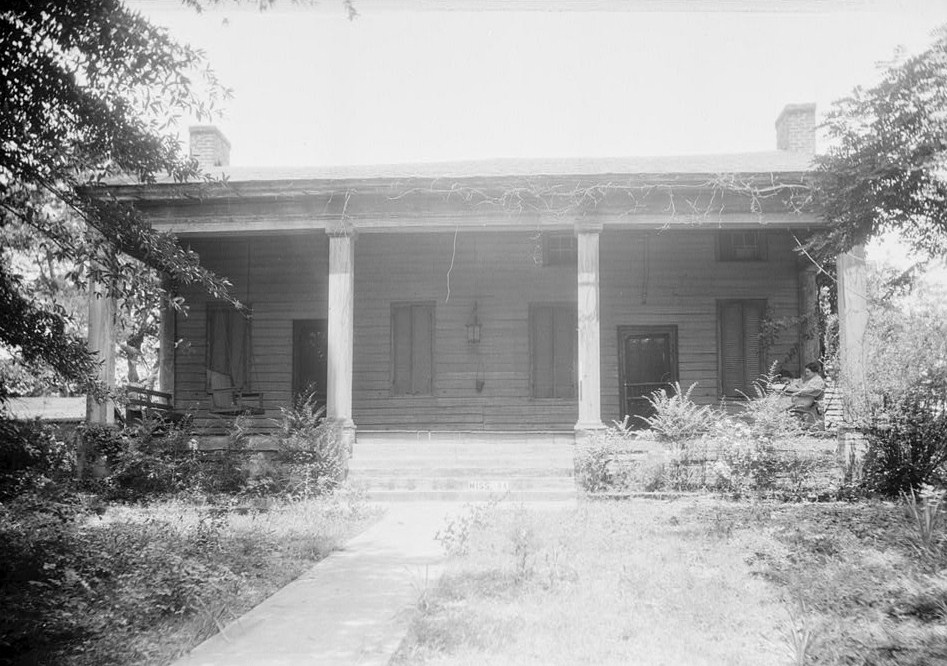

- Location within Mississippi Location within the United States
- Location: 1311 Military Road; Columbus, Mississippi
- Coordinates: 33°30′36″N 88°25′9″W
- Area: 4 acres (1.6 ha)
- Built: 1830
- NRHP reference No.: 79001328
- Added to NRHP: March 29, 1979

The Cedars is an historic early 19th century house in Columbus, Mississippi.

== History ==
The Cedars began as a log cabin whose exact construction date and original owner are unknown but is believed to be c. 1830 and possibly as early as 1818. The first recorded owner was Vardry McBee, who sold the land and cabin to Richard Randolph's great grandson Edward Brett Randolph in 1835. Capt. Randolph was from Virginia and settled near Caledonia, Mississippi in 1825 on a plantation that he named Goshen. Shortly before buying the McBee property, Randolph freed all of his slaves, sending any that wished to go to settle in Liberia.

The original log cabin was single-pen, 21 foot square, and made of hewn pine. Randolph and his wife, Elizabeth Bland Beverley, made renovations in 1835–1836, elevating the roof-line an extending the gable end south to add a room. A kitchen was also added. In 1979, the house had a 1 1/2-story gable roof front section with a one-story multi-gable rear section. A part of the original log cabin wall could still be seen along a stairway. A brick-wall basement and brick-pier foundation support the house. The house is on its original four-acre lot with a cedar-lined perimeter.

The cabin is believed to be the oldest existing house in Columbus and one of the oldest buildings. As of 1979, the house remained in the hands of Captain Randolph's descendants. It was added to the National Register of Historic Places in 1979.
