= Port of Richmond (Virginia) =

Coordinates: 37°27′24″N 77°25′18″W

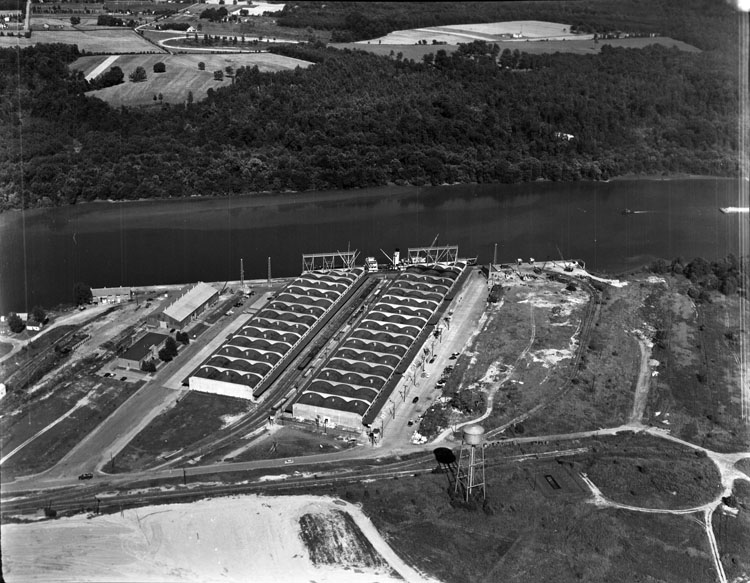
Aerial photo of the Port of Richmond, ca. 1957 (looking east)

The Port of Richmond, also known as the Richmond Deepwater Terminal and the Richmond Marine Terminal, is located on the James River in Richmond, Virginia, United States, 100 miles (160 km) inland from Cape Henry and approximately 78 miles (126 km) northwest of Newport News, Virginia. It is located at 77° 25' west longitude and 37° 27' north latitude, lies adjacent to Interstate 95, and is 4 miles (6 km) south of downtown Richmond. Richmond is the western terminus for commercial navigation on the James River, due to the Fall Line. The port is operated and leased by the Virginia Port Authority.

== History ==
Richmond had an extensive history as a port city; the city formed at its current location as the Fall Line prevents further navigation up the James River. The Chesapeake & Ohio (C&O) Railway saw Richmond as a prime location to export coal. To support this, the company built a tunnel under Church Hill, and operations began to the port in 1873. However, changing shipping technologies meant that larger ships were more economical, and the failure to materialize of a proposed James River dredging project caused the owner of the C&O, Collis Huntington, to extend the tracks 74 miles east to Newport News for a direct connection with the port there. Operations in the tunnel ceased in 1902 after completion of a new, more direct, viaduct. In 1925, it collapsed and was sealed off.

The port's facilities at its current location were built in 1940. The port was built on land that was at one time part of the unincorporated town and port of Warwick, which was burned by the British in 1781. Owned by the city of Richmond, Virginia, it is one of only a few municipality-owned ports on the Eastern Seaboard. After a city task force concluded that the port was a vital asset, the Port of Richmond Commission was created in 1982 to run it.

It continues to serve Chester, Pennsylvania, Liverpool, England and Antwerp, Belgium, and added service to Wilmington, North Carolina. Eimskip, Iceland's biggest transportation company, began service in November 2006 and ended service in 2011.

The 2008 recession hit the port hard, and caused many carriers to stop providing service to it. The facility lost 78 percent of its cargo traffic, including, in early 2009, Independent Container Line (ICL), the port's principal carrier at the time, after more than 20 years of service. However, in 2008, with city funding, the James River Barge Line started the 64 Express, a barge service that ramped up to provide thrice-weekly service from the Port of Virginia. A trip up the river is about 100 miles and takes about 12 hours. The Virginia Port Authority, a political subdivision of the Commonwealth, entered into a 5-year lease on the facility in 2010. In early 2018, they signed a 40-year lease and used federal grant money to buy a new harbor crane, allowing for faster unloading of cargo from ships. They have invested millions into the port, allowing for an increase in volume.

In 2018, the port entered into an agreement with Scoular, a Nebraska-based agricultural company, that allows for empty containers heading back down the river to be filled with agricultural products. As of 2019, a dozen ocean shipping lines offered service to Richmond.

In 2023, Fednav sold FMT, the port's day-to-day operator, to Logistec Stevedoring, a subsidiary of Toronto-based Logistec Corp, to focus on shipping.

A modern $6.1 million investment project will allow faster movement of trucks through the gate, add a secured drop-lot for truckers to drop their loads at night, and add improved lighting to allow barges to unload later into the night, which will improve cargo-handling speed. Starting in 2024, the port has used clean electricity to power all its vehicles and operations.

== Cargo handling capabilities ==
The Port of Richmond is a domestic and international multi-modal freight and distribution center serving waterborne, rail and truck shippers throughout the mid-Atlantic region. It handles containers, breakbulk, bulk, neo-bulk and livestock cargo. The port has container and general cargo facilities on the James River and is part of a supply-chain network of over 600 warehouses.

Major port cargo include tobacco, tobacco products, textiles, newsprint, wastepaper, chemicals, steel, steel products, phosphates, forest products, machinery, project cargo, refractory, vehicles, pharmaceuticals, aplite and livestock.

The facility has the capacity to handle fifty to sixty thousand TEUs (Twenty-foot [container] Equivalent Units). Much of the port's cargo comes via barge from the Port of Virginia, which uses it and the Virginia Inland Port as a way to handle excess cargo at coastal facilities. Because of the barge service, many companies, including Lidl, Brother, Bissell, and LL Flooring, were able to open up distribution facilities near the port.

== See also ==
- Deepwater Terminal Railroad
- Southside (Richmond, Virginia)
