= Powhite Park =

Park in Richmond, Virginia, United States

Coordinates: 37°31′15″N 77°31′39″W

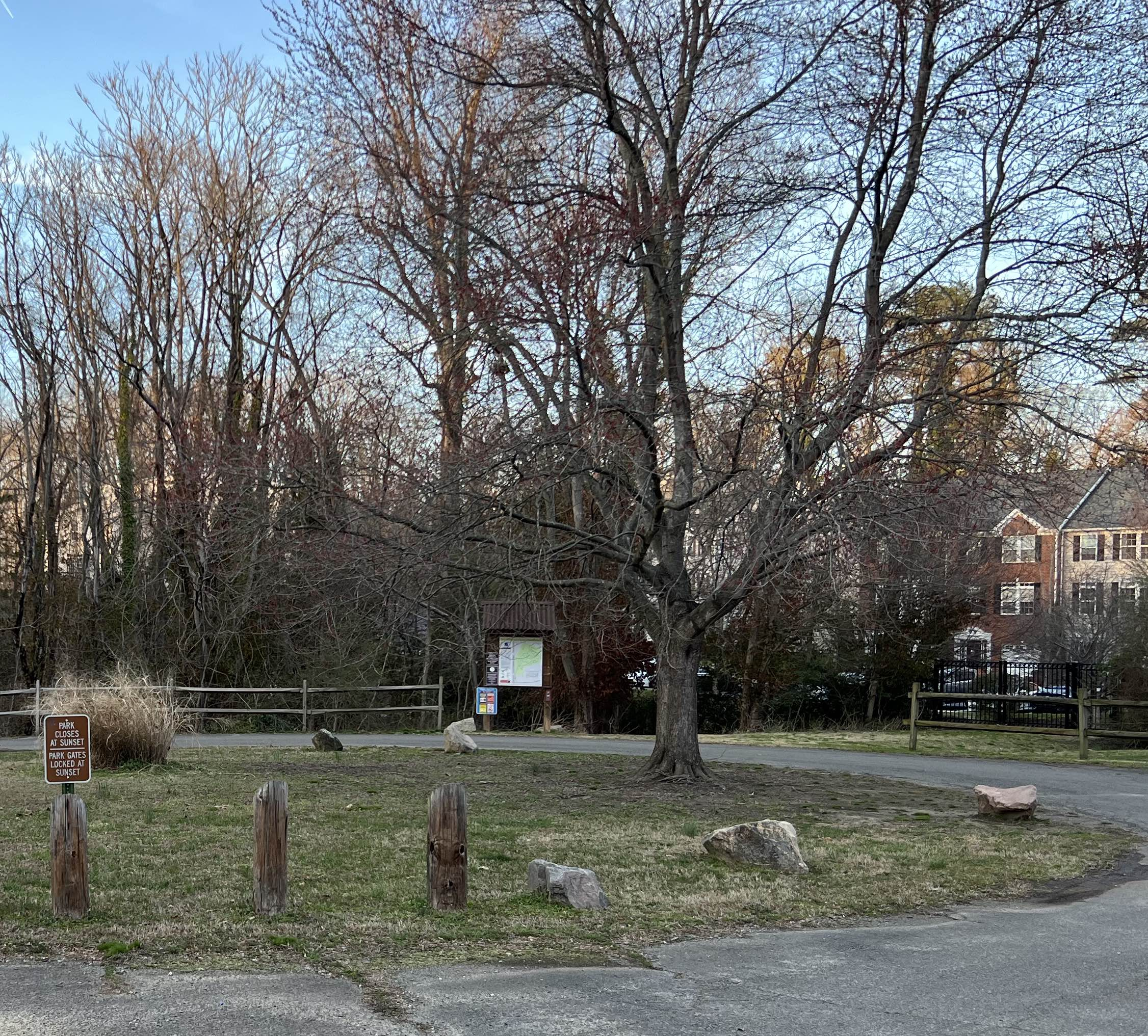
One of the entrances to Powhite Park.

Powhite Park is a 100-acre park in the city limits of Richmond, Virginia. It is close to the junction of Powhite Parkway, Chippenham Parkway and Jahnke Road. This park is notable for its pristinity and beaver dam, considering the park is in city limits. The park is also populated by deer. The bike trail is considered moderate.
