= Chamberlayne, Virginia =

- Census-designated place
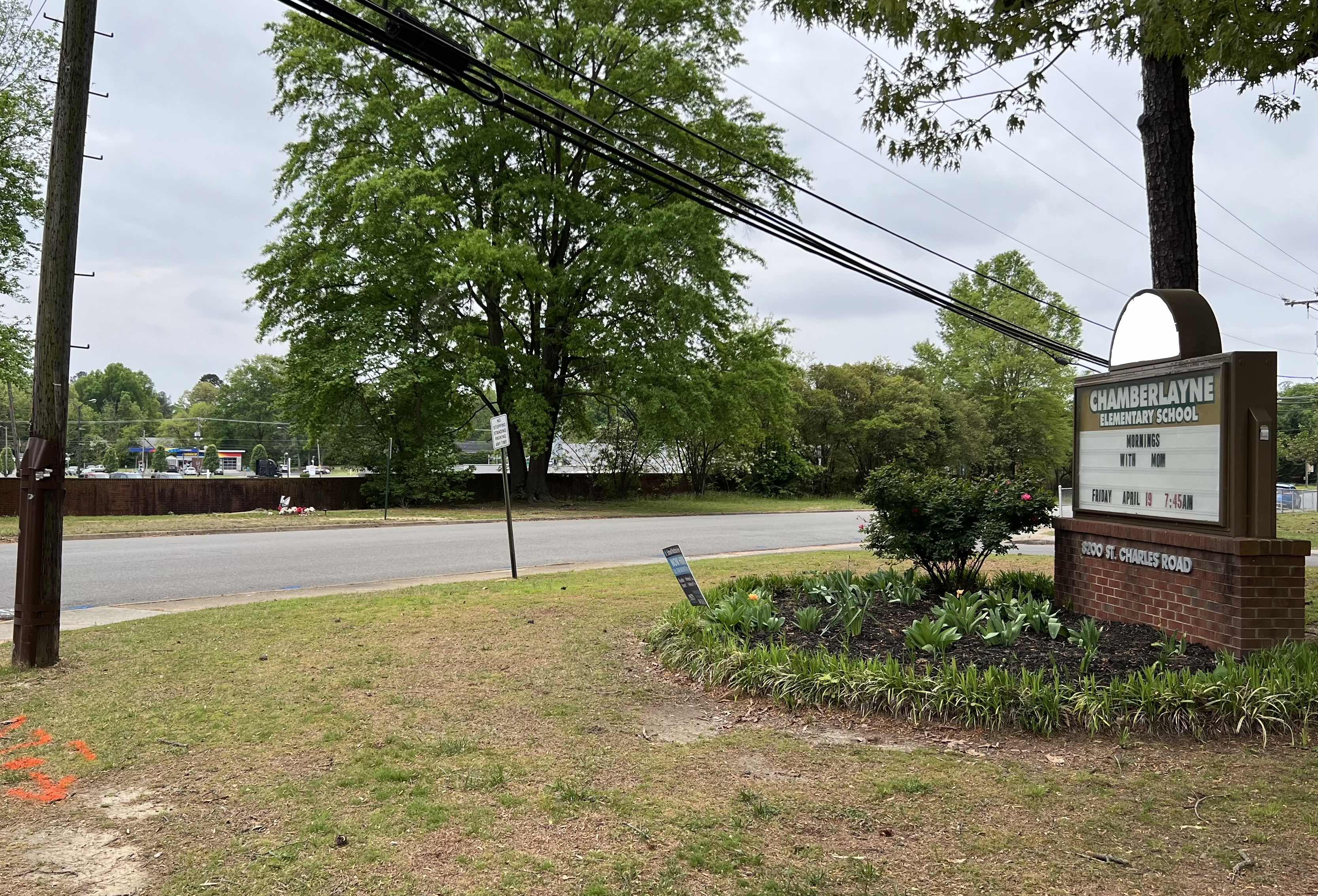

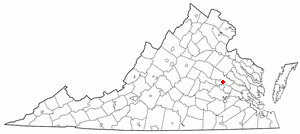
- Location of Chamberlayne, Virginia
- Coordinates: 37°37′51″N 77°26′16″W
- Country: United States
- State: Virginia
- County: Henrico

Area
  - Total: 3.7 sq mi (9.5 km^{2})
  - Land: 3.4 sq mi (8.7 km^{2})
  - Water: 0.35 sq mi (0.9 km^{2})
- Elevation: 180 ft (55 m)

Population (2020)
  - Total: 5,581
  - Density: 1,700/sq mi (640/km^{2})
- Time zone: UTC−5 (Eastern (EST))
  - Summer (DST): UTC−4 (EDT)
- FIPS code: 51-14544
- GNIS feature ID: 2389300

Chamberlayne is a census-designated place (CDP) in Henrico County, Virginia, United States. The population was 5,581 at the 2020 census.

== Geography ==
Chamberlayne is located at 37°37′51″N 77°26′16″W (37.630794, −77.437807).

According to the United States Census Bureau, the CDP has a total area of 3.7 square miles (9.5 km^{2}), of which 3.4 square miles (8.7 km^{2}) is land and 0.35 square miles (0.9 km^{2}), or 8.99%, is water.

== Demographics ==
Historical population
Census	Pop.	Note	%±
1980	5,136		—
1990	4,577		−10.9%
2000	4,380		−4.3%
2010	5,456		24.6%
2020	5,581		2.3%
U.S. Decennial Census; 1950 1960 1970; 1980 1990 2000; 2010

Chamberlayne was first listed as a census designated place in the 1980 U.S. census.

=== Racial and ethnic composition ===
Chamberlayne CDP, Virginia – Racial and ethnic composition Note: the US Census treats Hispanic/Latino as an ethnic category. This table excludes Latinos from the racial categories and assigns them to a separate category. Hispanics/Latinos may be of any race.
Race / Ethnicity (NH = Non-Hispanic)	Pop 2000	Pop 2010	Pop 2020	% 2000	% 2010	% 2020
White alone (NH)	2,083	1,836	1,817	47.56%	33.65%	32.56%
Black or African American alone (NH)	2,145	3,170	3,055	48.97%	58.10%	54.74%
Native American or Alaska Native alone (NH)	7	7	17	0.16%	0.13%	0.30%
Asian alone (NH)	49	154	168	1.12%	2.82%	3.01%
Native Hawaiian or Pacific Islander alone (NH)	4	0	0	0.09%	0.00%	0.00%
Other race alone (NH)	6	10	22	0.14%	0.18%	0.39%
Mixed race or Multiracial (NH)	49	119	243	1.12%	2.18%	4.35%
Hispanic or Latino (any race)	37	160	259	0.84%	2.93%	4.64%
Total	4,380	5,456	5,581	100.00%	100.00%	100.00%

=== 2000 Census ===
As of the census of 2000, there were 4,380 people, 1,884 households, and 1,352 families residing in the CDP. The population density was 1,163.5 people per square mile (449.8/km^{2}). There were 1,916 housing units at an average density of 509.0/sq mi (196.7/km^{2}). The racial makeup of the CDP was 47.83% White, 49.20% African American, 0.16% Native American, 1.12% Asian, 0.09% Pacific Islander, 0.39% from other races, and 1.21% from two or more races. Hispanic or Latino of any race were 0.84% of the population.

There were 1,884 households, out of which 19.5% had children under the age of 18 living with them, 58.4% were married couples living together, 10.0% had a female householder with no husband present, and 28.2% were non-families. 24.2% of all households were made up of individuals, and 12.1% had someone living alone who was 65 years of age or older. The average household size was 2.32 and the average family size was 2.73.

In the CDP, the population was spread out, with 16.6% under the age of 18, 4.5% from 18 to 24, 22.2% from 25 to 44, 32.4% from 45 to 64, and 24.2% who were 65 years of age or older. The median age was 49 years. For every 100 females there were 89.0 males. For every 100 females age 18 and over, there were 86.2 males.

The median income for a household in the CDP was $54,022, and the median income for a family was $60,425. Males had a median income of $40,858 versus $32,422 for females. The per capita income for the CDP was $28,405. About 1.9% of families and 3.3% of the population were below the poverty line, including 2.7% of those under age 18 and 2.3% of those age 65 or over.
