= Ampthill (Chesterfield County, Virginia) =

Former plantation in Virginia, US

Coordinates: 37°27′1.9″N 77°26′27.5″W

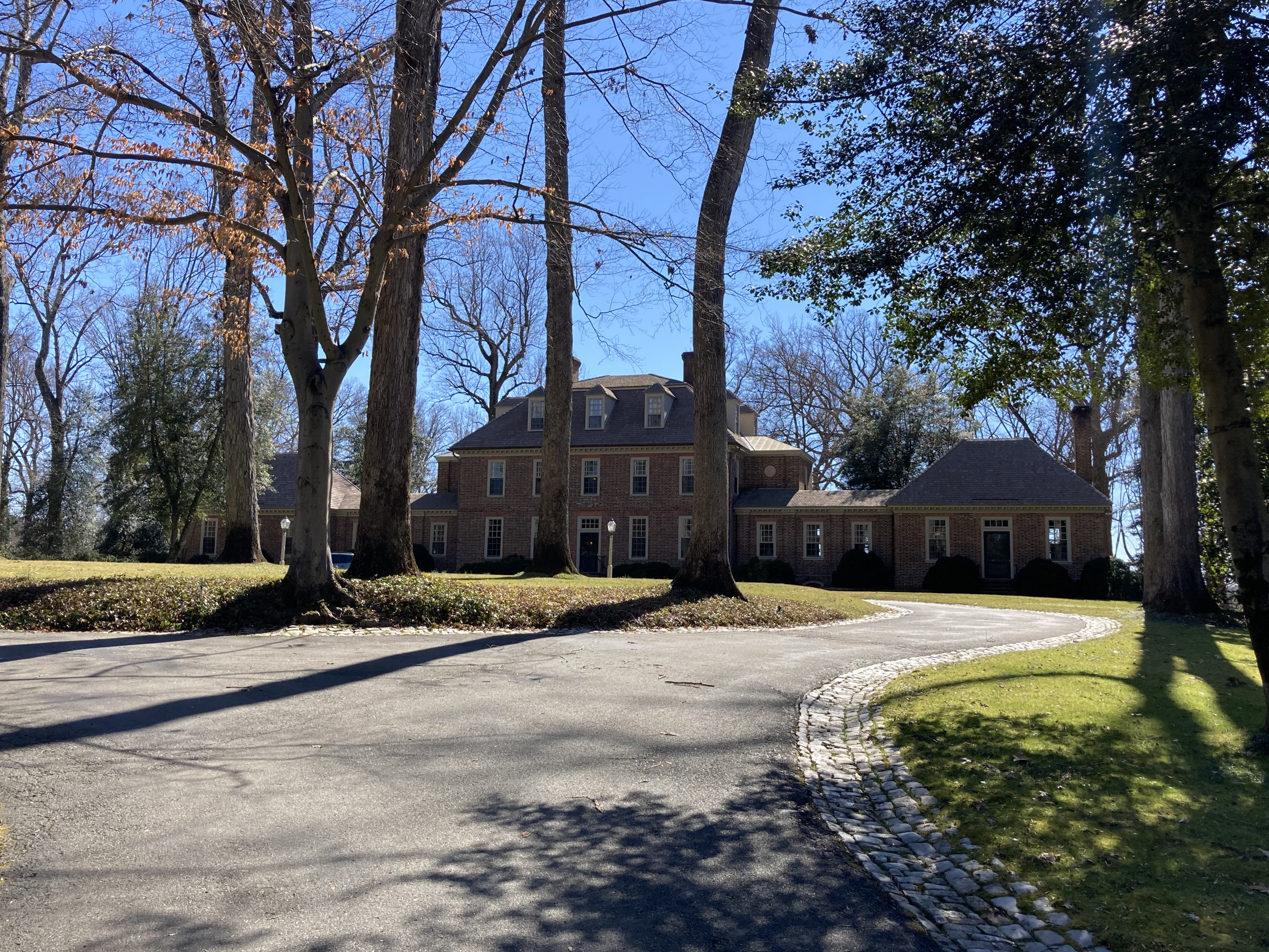
Ampthill Plantation main house at relocated site in 2021

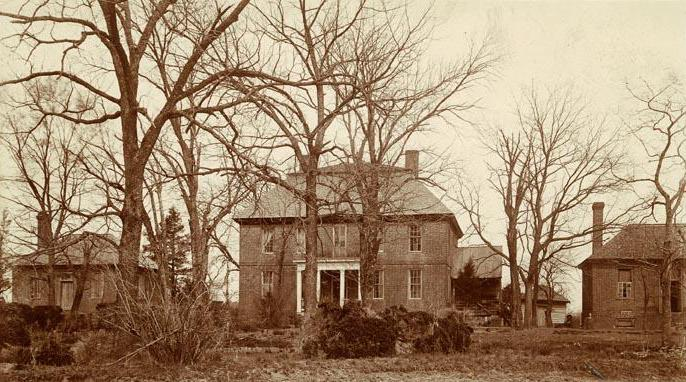
Ampthill Plantation at original site in the 1890s

Ampthill Plantation was located in the Virginia Colony in Chesterfield County on the south bank of the James River about four miles south of the head of navigation at modern-day Richmond, Virginia. Built by Henry Cary, Jr. about 1730, it was just upstream of Falling Creek. It was later owned by Colonel Archibald Cary, who maintained a flour mill complex and iron forge at the nearby town of Warwick. Mary Randolph was born there in 1762.

== House moved, property becomes industrial site ==
In 1929, Ampthill House, the manor house of Ampthill Plantation, was dismantled, moved to a site on Cary Street Road in the West End of Richmond, and reassembled where it sits today. Although it is not open to the public, Ampthill House is a noteworthy local landmark, and is marked by a Virginia Historical Marker.

The former plantation property on the James River near Falling Creek is occupied by the Spruance Plant and related industrial complex of the DuPont Company.
