= Stony Point Fashion Park =

Coordinates: 37.550330°N 77.571736°W

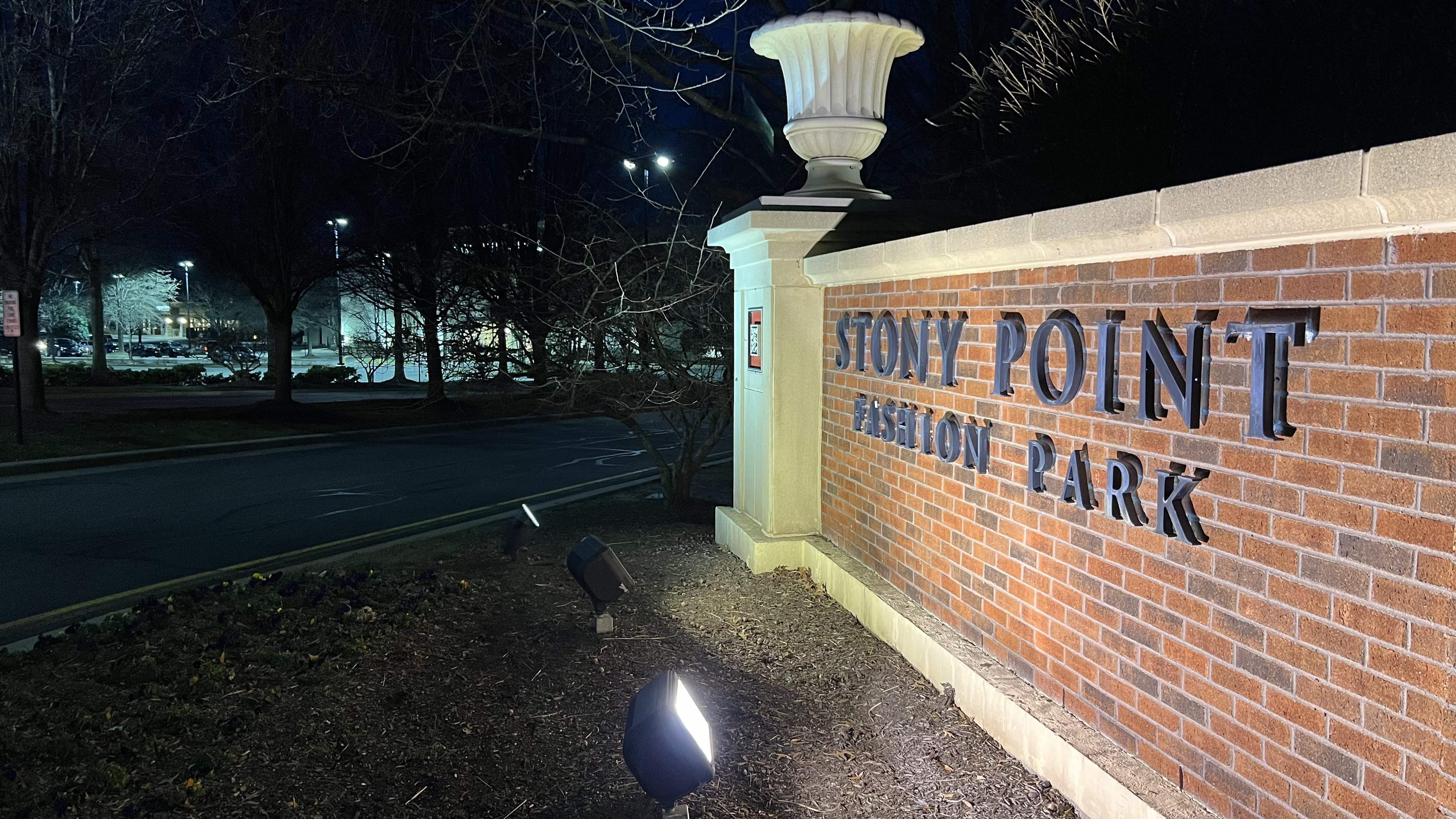
- Location: Richmond, Virginia, United States
- Opened: September 18, 2003; 23 years ago
- Developer: Taubman Centers
- Manager: JLL Properties
- Owner: JLL Properties
- Num. of stores: 40+
- Num. of anchor tenants: 2
- Floor area: 687,411 square feet (63,862.6 m^{2})
- Floors: 1
- Website: Stony Point Fashion Park

Stony Point Fashion Park is an outdoor shopping center in Richmond, Virginia. The center currently maintains more than 30 Richmond-based businesses, with anchor tenant Dillard's.

Stony Point is the only mall in the region that offers a dog-friendly environment along with comfort stations located throughout the center.

Taubman Centers unveiled a proposal in 1995 that they would construct a high-end mall in the southern part of Richmond. Stony Point was inaugurated in September 2003. Occupying 690,000 square feet (64,000 m^{2}) of space, it had Saks Fifth Avenue and Dillard's as its main anchor tenants when it opened.

On February 10, 2026, it was announced that the center's Saks Fifth Avenue would be closing as part of a plan to close 8 stores nationwide.

== Bibliography ==
- Williamson, Thad; Hayter, Julian M.; Howard, Amy L. (2024). The Making of Twenty-First-Century Richmond: Politics, Policy, and Governance, 1988–2016. Chapel Hill, North Carolina: University of North Carolina Press. pp. 155–157. ISBN 978-1-4696-8131-3 – via Google Books.
