= Tuckahoe, Virginia =

- Census-designated place
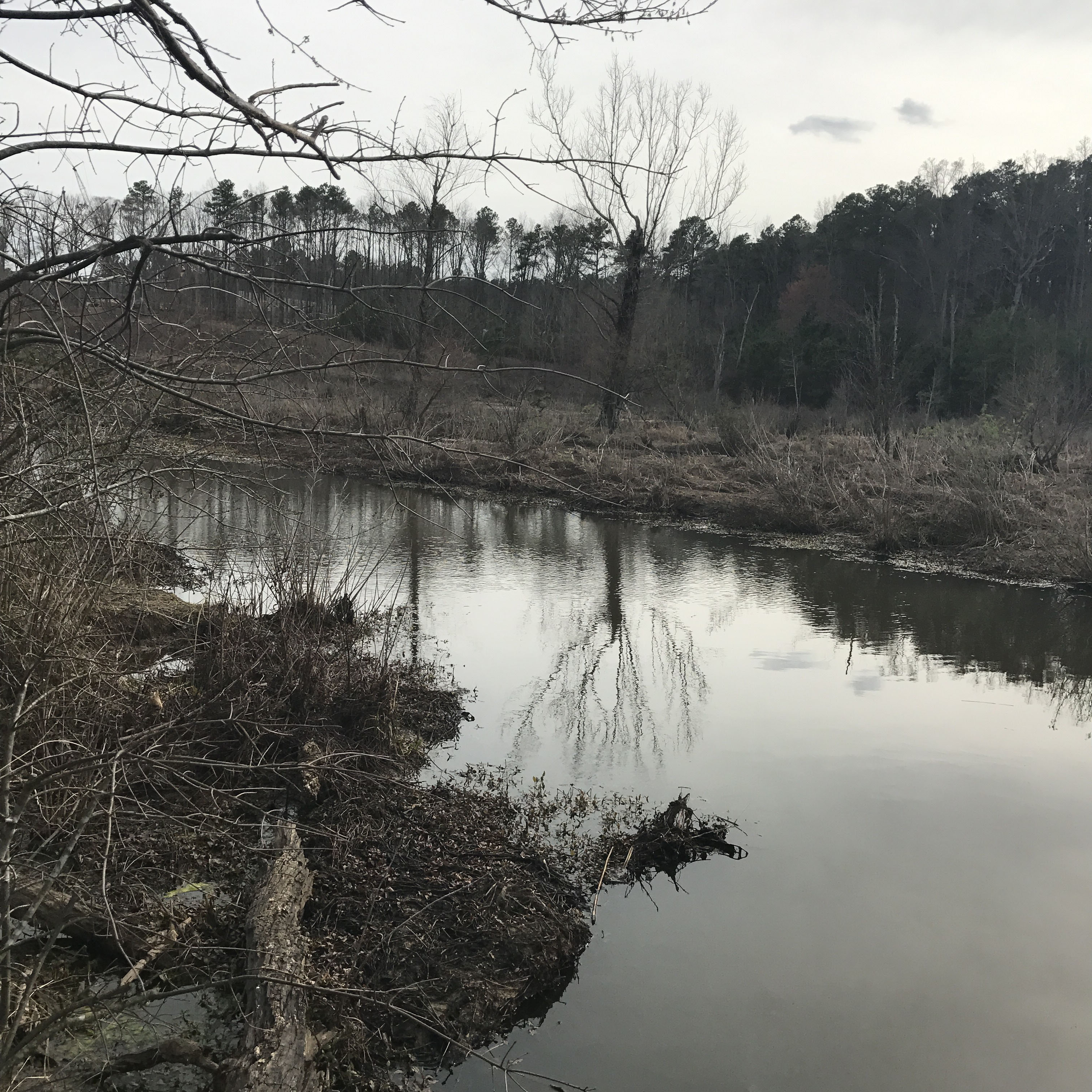
- Tuckahoe Creek, which forms the western border of Tuckahoe

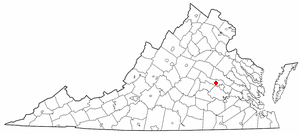
- Location of Tuckahoe, Virginia
- Coordinates: 37°35′45″N 77°34′33″W
- Country: United States
- State: Virginia
- County: Henrico

Area
  - Total: 21.8 sq mi (56.4 km^{2})
  - Land: 20.5 sq mi (53.0 km^{2})
  - Water: 1.3 sq mi (3.4 km^{2})
- Elevation: 217 ft (66 m)

Population (2020)
  - Total: 48,051
  - Density: 2,350/sq mi (907/km^{2})
- Time zone: UTC−5 (Eastern (EST))
  - Summer (DST): UTC−4 (EDT)
- ZIP code: 23229
- Area code: 804
- FIPS code: 51-79560
- GNIS feature ID: 1493721

Tuckahoe is a census-designated place (CDP) in Henrico County, Virginia, United States. It is a suburb to the west of Richmond. The population of Tuckahoe was 48,049 at the 2020 census. It is named after the area's history as the site of Thomas Randolph's Tuckahoe Plantation which still stands along the James River.

== Geography ==
According to the United States Census Bureau, the CDP has a total area of 21.8 square miles (56.4 km^{2}), of which 20.5 square miles (53.0 km^{2}) is land and 1.3 square miles (3.4 km^{2}), or 6.08%, is water.

The western boundary of Tuckahoe is formed by Tuckahoe Creek, a large undeveloped swampy creek which forms part of the boundary between Goochland County and Henrico County.

=== Climate ===
Tuckahoe is located in the warm temperate climate zone and has hot and humid summers and relatively cold winters. Precipitation is evenly distributed throughout the year. Snowfall in Tuckahoe averages about 13 inches each year and occurs on about 7–8 days a year. White Christmases do not occur most years in Tuckahoe but are not uncommon. The probability for a White Christmas each year is seven percent. White Christmases were observed in December 2009 and December 2010. However, there are many other years when there is accumulated snow already on the ground at Christmas time.

Climate data for Tuckahoe, Virginia (1980-2010)
Month	Jan	Feb	Mar	Apr	May	Jun	Jul	Aug	Sep	Oct	Nov	Dec	Year
Mean daily maximum °F (°C)	46.9 (8.3)	50.8 (10.4)	59.4 (15.2)	70.1 (21.2)	77.4 (25.2)	85.1 (29.5)	88.5 (31.4)	87.1 (30.6)	80.9 (27.2)	70.7 (21.5)	60.7 (15.9)	50.1 (10.1)	69.0 (20.5)
Mean daily minimum °F (°C)	25.2 (−3.8)	27.4 (−2.6)	33.6 (0.9)	42.9 (6.1)	51.8 (11.0)	61.3 (16.3)	65.6 (18.7)	64.4 (18.0)	56.8 (13.8)	45.1 (7.3)	36.0 (2.2)	28.1 (−2.2)	44.8 (7.1)
Average precipitation inches (mm)	3.2 (81)	2.9 (74)	3.9 (99)	3.3 (84)	3.9 (99)	3.5 (89)	4.3 (110)	4.2 (110)	3.7 (94)	3.3 (84)	3.6 (91)	3.4 (86)	43.2 (1,101)
Source: USA.com

== Demographics ==
Historical population
Census	Pop.	Note	%±
1980	39,868		—
1990	42,629		6.9%
2000	43,242		1.4%
2010	44,990		4.0%
2020	48,051		6.8%
U.S. Decennial Census; 1950 1960 1970; 1980 1990 2000; 2010

Tuckahoe was first listed as a census designated place in the 1980 U.S. census.

=== Racial and ethnic composition ===
Tuckahoe CDP, Virginia – Racial and ethnic composition Note: the US Census treats Hispanic/Latino as an ethnic category. This table excludes Latinos from the racial categories and assigns them to a separate category. Hispanics/Latinos may be of any race.
Race / Ethnicity (NH = Non-Hispanic)	Pop 2000	Pop 2010	Pop 2020	% 2000	% 2010	% 2020
White alone (NH)	37,856	35,358	34,853	87.54%	78.59%	72.53%
Black or African American alone (NH)	2,450	4,250	4,661	5.67%	9.45%	9.70%
Native American or Alaska Native alone (NH)	68	75	47	0.16%	0.17%	0.10%
Asian alone (NH)	1,480	1,822	2,409	3.42%	4.05%	5.01%
Native Hawaiian or Pacific Islander alone (NH)	11	13	7	0.03%	0.03%	0.01%
Other race alone (NH)	31	133	297	0.07%	0.30%	0.62%
Mixed race or Multiracial (NH)	423	699	2,017	0.98%	1.55%	4.20%
Hispanic or Latino (any race)	923	2,640	3,760	2.13%	5.87%	7.83%
Total	43,242	44,990	48,051	100.00%	100.00%	100.00%

=== 2020 census ===
As of the 2020 census, Tuckahoe had a population of 48,051. The median age was 40.3 years. 23.3% of residents were under the age of 18 and 19.8% of residents were 65 years of age or older. For every 100 females there were 89.2 males, and for every 100 females age 18 and over there were 85.6 males age 18 and over.

99.8% of residents lived in urban areas, while 0.2% lived in rural areas.

There were 19,151 households in Tuckahoe, of which 31.6% had children under the age of 18 living in them. Of all households, 49.7% were married-couple households, 15.3% were households with a male householder and no spouse or partner present, and 29.6% were households with a female householder and no spouse or partner present. About 28.3% of all households were made up of individuals and 14.6% had someone living alone who was 65 years of age or older.

There were 19,878 housing units, of which 3.7% were vacant. The homeowner vacancy rate was 0.8% and the rental vacancy rate was 4.4%.

Racial composition as of the 2020 census
Race	Number	Percent
White	35,563	74.0%
Black or African American	4,773	9.9%
American Indian and Alaska Native	94	0.2%
Asian	2,416	5.0%
Native Hawaiian and Other Pacific Islander	15	0.0%
Some other race	1,735	3.6%
Two or more races	3,455	7.2%

=== 2010 census ===
As of the census of 2010, there were 44,990 people, 18,126 households, and 11,963 families residing in the CDP. The population density was 2,102.7 people per square mile (811.7/km^{2}). There were 18,647 housing units at an average density of 906.7/sq mi (350.0/km^{2}). The racial makeup of the CDP was 75.9% Non-Hispanic White, 9.3% African American, 0.1% Native American, 4.7% Asian (2.3% Nepalese, 1.4% Indian, 0.5% Chinese, 0.4% Vietnamese, 0.1% Other) 0.07% Pacific Islander, 0.2% from other races, and 2.5% from two or more races. Hispanic or Latino of any race were 6.9% of the population.

There were 18,126 households, out of which 29.8% had children under the age of 18 living with them, 55.0% were married couples living together, 8.6% had a female householder with no husband present, and 34.0% were non-families. 28.4% of all households were made up of individuals, and 11.1% had someone living alone who was 65 years of age or older. The average household size was 2.36 and the average family size was 2.92.

In the CDP, the population was spread out, with 23.2% under the age of 18, 6.6% from 18 to 24, 27.7% from 25 to 44, 24.7% from 45 to 64, and 17.8% who were 65 years of age or older. The median age was 40 years. For every 100 females, there were 87.3 males. For every 100 females aged 18 and over, there were 83.4 males.

The median income for a household in the CDP was $65,420, and the median income for a family was $89,320. Males had a median income of $41,286 versus $31,445 for females. The per capita income for the CDP was $41,883. About 2.4% of families and 4.0% of the population were below the poverty line, including 4.2% of those under age 18 and 4.0% of those age 65 or over. The median income is much lower than the mean income due to a high-income disparity.

=== 2014–2018 American Community Survey ===
Ancestry in Tuckahoe, VA (2014-2018)
Origin	percent
English American (Includes "American" ancestry)	23.4%
Scottish or Irish American (Including Scots-Irish)	17.5%
German American	12.6%
African American (Does not include West Indian or African)	8.7%
Italian American	5.8%
South Asian Americans (Includes Indian, Pakistani, Bangladeshi, etc.)	3.2%
Russian and East European (Includes Russian, Ukrainian, Belarusian, etc.)	2.7%
Scandinavian Americans (Also includes Iceland, Finland, and Baltic States)	2.3%
Polish American	2.2%
East Asian American (Includes Chinese, Japanese, Vietnamese, etc.)	2.2%
Central American (Includes Honduran, Salvadoran, Costa Rican, etc.)	2.1%
South American (Includes Peruvian, Ecuadorian, Argentinian)	2.1%
Other	15.2%

== Gallery ==
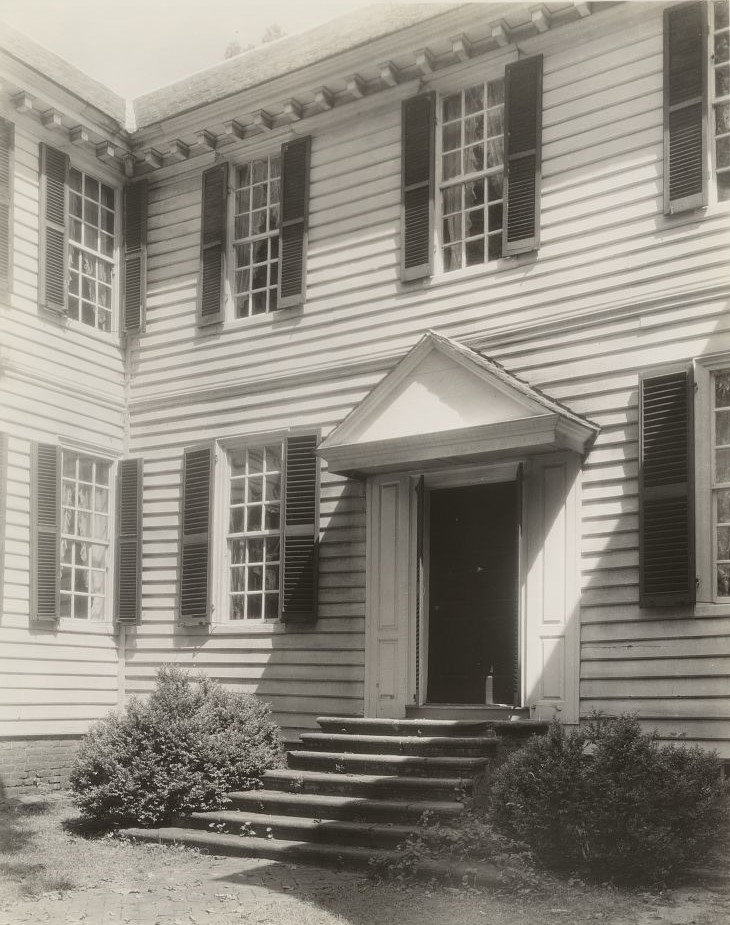
Tuckahoe House
