= Falling Creek Ironworks =

Archaeological site in Virginia, United States

- Falling Creek Ironworks Archeological Site
- U.S. National Register of Historic Places
- Virginia Landmarks Register
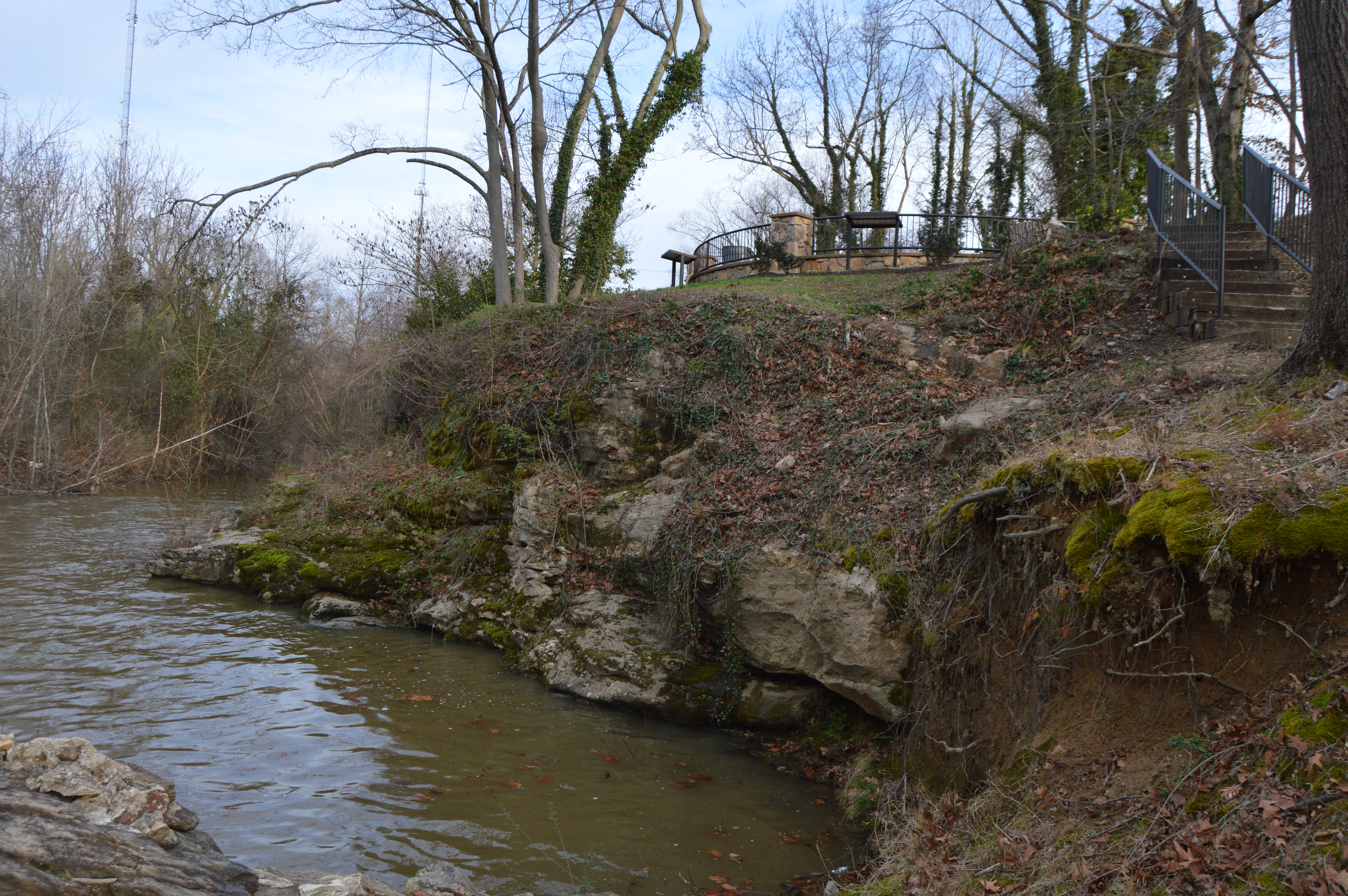
- Western section of the site

- Location within Virginia Location within the United States
- Nearest city: Richmond, Virginia
- Coordinates: 37°26′19″N 77°26′19″W
- Area: 3.5 acres (1.4 ha)
- Built: 1619
- NRHP reference No.: 95000242
- VLR No.: 020-0063

Significant dates
- Added to NRHP: March 29, 1995
- Designated VLR: January 15, 1995

Falling Creek Ironworks was the first iron production facility in North America. It was established by the Virginia Company of London in Henrico Cittie (sic) on Falling Creek near its confluence with the James River. It was short-lived due to an attack by Native Americans in 1622.

The long-lost site was rediscovered in the early 21st century. It is now located in Chesterfield County, about 5 miles (8.0 km) south of the fall line of the James River at present-day Richmond, Virginia. Archaeological and related research work at the site was ongoing as of March 2007.

== Geography ==
The geology of Virginia's terrain changes from the sandy coastal plain of the Tidewater Region to the more hilly and rocky Piedmont Region along the north-south Fall Line. At Richmond, the generally west to east flowing James River turns almost due south and essentially flows parallel to and just east of the fall line for about 8 miles (13 km), before turning east again near Drewry's Bluff. On the west bank of this section, the Piedmont terrain contained the ore deposits needed to make iron, but was still adjacent to the navigable portion of the James River through the Tidewater Region. A local tributary, Falling Creek, flowed downhill into the James River, providing the water power needed.

== History ==
=== Background ===
The proprietary Virginia Company of London established the first permanent English settlement in the Virginia Colony at Jamestown on May 14, 1607. The young colony struggled for years to develop self-sufficiency and successful exports. During the first five years, most of the colonists died from disease, starvation, and attacks by the Native Americans.

After 1612, non-native strains of tobacco were used as a cash crop, and plantations and other outposts from Jamestown spread downstream and up the James River toward the head of navigation (fall line) at present-day Richmond.

=== First ironworks ===
Near the confluence of Falling Creek with the James River, the colonists identified the site with the combination of ore deposits, water power, and access to navigable waters for shipping which were needed for their desired iron production facility. Although the outpost was one of the most remote from Jamestown, beginning in 1619, the Falling Creek Ironworks was established there. It was the first iron production facility in North America.

Records which have survived indicate that the ironworks was able to produce some quantity of iron. However, from the extant records, it cannot be determined whether the ironworks had begun full production before operations were interrupted by the Indian massacre of 1622.

On March 22, 1622, the Powhatan Confederacy of Native Americans tribes under the leadership of Chief Opechancanough conducted a series of coordinated surprise attacks on almost all the English settlements along the James River. Jamestown was spared only due to a timely warning. The massacre resulted in the death of about a third of the colonists. Two women and three children were among the 27 killed at Falling Creek Ironworks, leaving only two colonists alive, and the facilities were destroyed. Sir Thomas Dale's progressive development a few miles downstream at Henricus was evacuated as a result.

=== Subsequent history ===
On July 21, 1646 George Ludlowe Esqr received 1,452 acres (5.88 km^{2}) in York Co, that was adjacent to the Falling Creek Mill lands which was in part granted to Martin Baker (Martin Fouquet) as Yorke Plantation by purchase from George Mosso, esquire (esquiem). And which was mortgaged together with an additional 102 acres (0.41 km^{2}) by Sir John Harve (John Harvey (Virginia governor)) as well as to pay transportation costs for 2 persons (Jean du Fer and his brother Francois, two surviving children of the 1622 massacre) as well as 750 acres (3.0 km^{2}) to pay for transportation for 15 persons (mill workers): Philip Bowden (Philip Bourdain), John Nerve (Jean Nervais), Henry Davis, John Bernberry (Jean Banbury/VanBerry), Nicholos Iego (Nicholas Legos), Bassett Sax (Basset d'Sais), Richard Oxon (Richard d'Hausson/Dawson), Thomas Bacock (Thomas Picot), Mary Fitch, John Fleet (Jean van Fleet), and John Mission (Jean Monceaux/Muscheon), Sara Spittlewood, Richard Colins, Thomas Lewis, John Gerford (Gifford) and William Benton, Robert Caldwell.

From 1750 until 1781, Archibald Cary operated a forge there, until it was destroyed, by Benedict Arnold, during the American Revolutionary War. Later attempts to restore the ironworks were unsuccessful, and the exact site itself eventually became lost.

== Rediscovery, ongoing work ==
The exact site of the Falling Creek Ironworks was unknown until relatively recently. According to an article in the Richmond Times-Dispatch newspaper on January 20, 2007, the heavy rains in the late summer of 2006 apparently eroded the creek bank and uncovered timbers of the furnace which were part of the structure. Early in 2007, a Chesterfield County Department of Utilities employee, who is also an amateur archaeologist, spotted them. According to the article, "The rest of the furnace is believed to be buried in the creek bank."

The location of the ironworks has long been suspected. A number of limited archaeological excavations and surveys were conducted by the Archaeological Society of Virginia, The College of William and Mary, Browning and Associates, LTD., and others. The location of the blast furnace was only confirmed in 1999 when Archaeo-Physics, LLC (working with Browning and Associates) did a comprehensive geophysical survey. A large magnetic anomaly consistent with the fired hearth of a blast furnace was located. In addition a number of other features were identified (probably buildings related to either the Falling Creek Ironworks or Archibald Cary's 1750-81 Forge).

== See also ==
- Saugus Iron Works National Historic Site, first integrated iron works in North America
