= Archibald Cary =

American politician

- Portrait by John Wollaston after an unknown artist, c. 1755–1758

1st Speaker of the Senate of Virginia
- In office 1776–1787

Member of the House of Burgesses
- In office 1756–1776

Personal details
- Born: January 24, 1721
- Died: February 26, 1787 (aged 66)
- Spouse: Mary Randolph
- Relations: Richard Randolph (father-in-law)
- Children: 9
- Parent(s): Henry Cary Jr. Ann Edwards
- Occupation: Planter, Soldier, Politician
- Known for: Ampthill

Archibald Cary (January 24, 1721 – February 26, 1787) was a Virginia planter, soldier, politician, and major landowner, in the colony of Virginia.

While a member of the 1776 Fifth Virginia Convention he chaired the committee which passed what became the Lee Resolution, the call for the Second Continental Congress to declare independence from Great Britain.

== Early life ==
Col. Archibald Cary was born on January 24, 1721. He was the son of Henry Cary Jr. and Ann Edwards Cary. He was educated in Williamsburg and Ampthill, Virginia and is believed to have attended the College of William and Mary.

Upon his father's death in 1749 or 1750, Cary inherited over 4,000 acres, lying on both sides of the Willis River, in what would eventually become Cumberland and Buckingham counties. His plantation, called Buckingham, was identified on the Joshua Fry-Peter Jefferson map (1752).

== Career ==
Cary was a member of the House of Burgesses from 1756 to 1776. In 1764, he served on the committee of Burgesses that wrote resolutions against the proposed Stamp Act, but the following year he voted against Patrick Henry's Virginia Resolves as being premature and too inflammatory.

As tensions with the mother country escalated, in 1773 Cary served as a member of Virginia's committee of correspondence. When the House of Burgesses was dissolved at the outset of the American Revolution, he served as a delegate to the Virginia Conventions. At the Fifth Virginia Convention in May 1776, he served as the chairman of the committee of the whole that adopted the celebrated Resolution of Independence, which instructed Virginia's delegates to the Second Continental Congress to propose a declaration of independence. After Virginia became an independent state in 1776, Cary became the first speaker of the Senate of Virginia, and remained in that position until his death.

=== Revolutionary War ===
During the American Revolutionary War, Cary was placed in charge of recruitment and supplies in central Virginia. He was asked by Thomas Jefferson, his colleague in the House of Burgesses and fellow graduate of the College of William & Mary, to loan the Virginia Colony the funds to underwrite the cost of the Virginia militia, on the promise by Jefferson he would be repaid later, though he never was repaid. He did fund the Virginia militia for the following reason: though he had always been loyal to the Crown (he had a Charter from the Crown for all his thousands of acres of property at Ampthill plantation), he had grown tired of British attempts to continue promoting the sale of slaves in America. Although he owned some 200 slaves, he had come to the conclusion that everything about the slave trade and the owning of African slaves was only going to create major problems in America.

=== Reputation ===
Cary was known among Baptists for arresting many Baptists for preaching without a license. There was one incident where a Baptist preacher continued to preach from his cell window. To solve the problem, Cary put a wall around the prison.

His nickname was "Old Iron". He operated Chesterfield Forge, which fabricated iron, starting in 1750, and ending in 1781, when it was burned by Benedict Arnold. He owned British thoroughbred horses and traded with England.

== Personal life ==
On May 31, 1744, Cary married Mary Randolph, the daughter of Richard Randolph of Curles, and sister of William Randolph of Tuckahoe (1713-1746), who married Maria Page (daughter of Mann Page). The two had nine children together and, through his marriage, Cary's children were lineal descendants of Pocahontas. Their children included:

- Anne Cary (1745–1789), who married Thomas Mann Randolph (1741–1793), her first cousin.
- Jane Cary (1751–1774), married Thomas Isham Randolph (1722–1778), the son of Isham Randolph and an uncle of United States President Thomas Jefferson, in 1768.
- Henry Cary (1752–1758), who died young.
- Sarah Cary (1753–1773), who married Archibald Bolling II (1748–1827)
- Elizabeth Cary (1760–1775), who married Robert Kincaid (1751–1801)
- Mary "Polly" Cary (1766–1797), who married Carter Page (1758–1825)
