= List of neighborhoods in Richmond, Virginia =

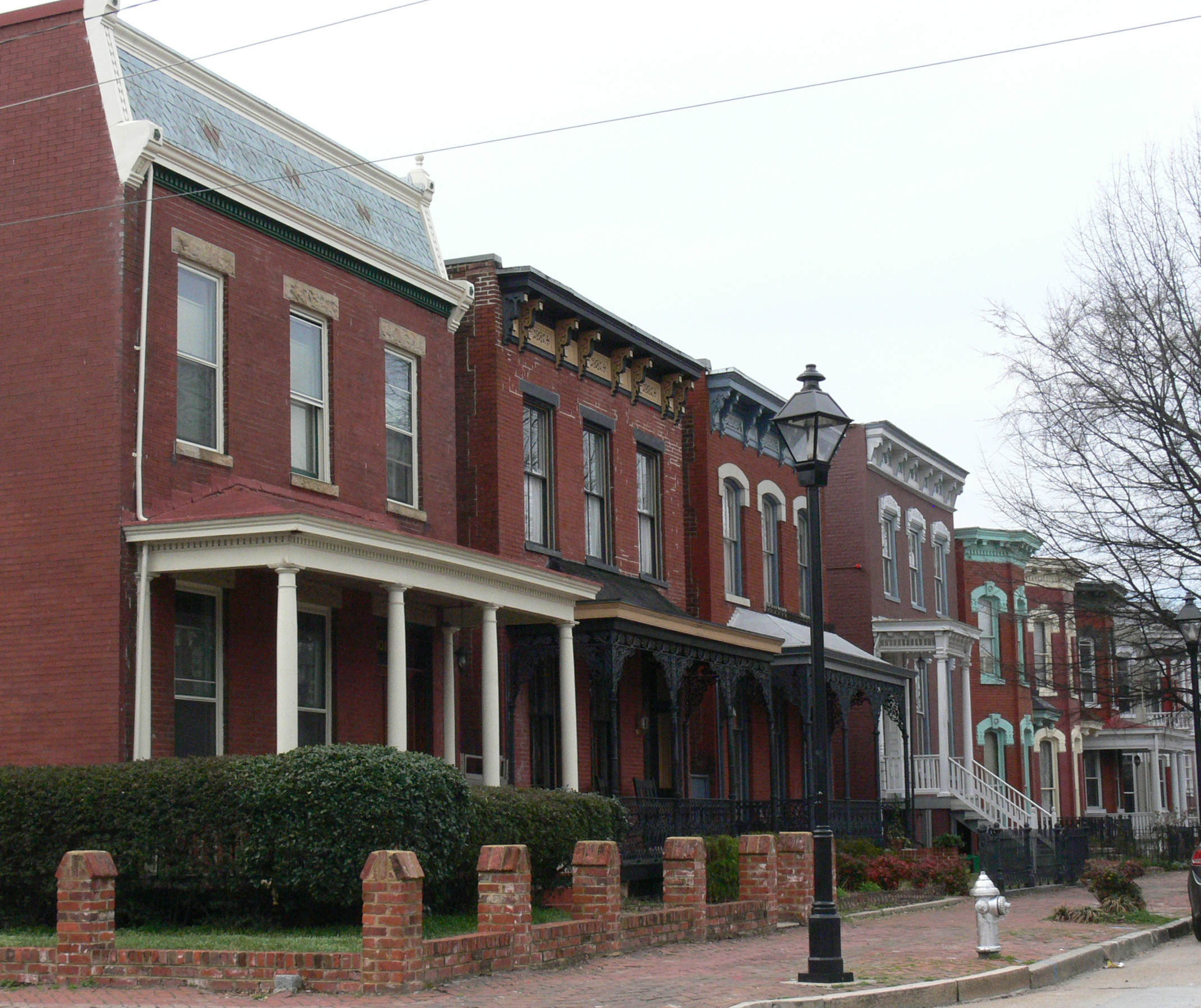
A row of houses in the Jackson Ward neighborhood of Richmond. The district was listed as a Landmark District in 1978.

Richmond, Virginia, is the capital city of the Commonwealth of Virginia, and the fifth largest city in the state in terms of population, and the main anchor city for the Greater Richmond Region, the third largest metropolitan statistical area in the Commonwealth, and the 43rd largest in the United States. The City of Richmond is divided into five distinct districts, each district is further subdivided into several neighborhoods, although there is no formal criterion as to what defines a neighborhood within the City of Richmond. The five districts of Richmond are Downtown, East End, North Side, Southside, and West End.

Below is a list of neighborhoods in Richmond, Virginia, divided by their district:

== Downtown ==
- Arts District
- Biotech and MCV
- City Center
- Court End
- Gambles Hill
- Jackson Ward
- Monroe Ward
- Midtown
- Shockoe Bottom
- Shockoe Slip
- Upper Shockoe Valley

== East End ==
- Brauers
- Chimborazo
- Church Hill
- Creighton
- Eastview
- Fairfield
- Fairmount
- Fulton Hill
- Montrose Heights
- Mosby
- Navy Hill
- Oakwood
- Peter Paul
- Tobacco Row
- Union Hill
- Witcomb Court

== Northside ==
- Barton Heights
- Bellevue
- Chamberlayne Industrial Center
- Edgewood
- Gilpin
- Ginter Park
- Green Park
- Hermitage Road
- Highland Park
- Highland Terrace
- Laburnum Park
- Magnolia Industrial Center
- North Highland Park
- Pine Camp
- Providence Park
- Rosedale
- Sherwood Park
- South Barton Heights
- Three Corners
- Washington Park

== Southside ==
- Ancarrow's Landing
- Bellemeade
- Belmont Woods
- Blackwell
- Broad Rock
- Brookbury
- Cherry Gardens
- Chippenham Forest
- Cofer
- Cottrell Farms
- Forest Hill
- Gravel Hill
- Hickory Hill
- Hillside Court
- Huguenot
- Jahnke
- Manchester
- Maury
- McGuire
- Northrop
- Oak Grove
- Oxford
- Piney Knolls
- South Richmond
- Southampton
- Stoney Point
- Stratford Hills
- Swansboro
- Walmsley
- Warwick
- Windsor
- Woodhaven
- Woodland Heights
- Worthington

== West End ==
- Byrd Park
- Carillon
- Carver
- Carytown
- Colonial Place
- Byrd Park
- The Fan
- Malvern Gardens
- Maymount
- Museum District
- Newtowne West
- Oregon Hill
- Randolph
- Rhoadmiller
- Scott's Addition
- Stadium
- Stonewall Court
- West of the Boulevard
- Westhampton
- Willow Lawn
- Wilton
- Windsor Farms
