= Shed Town =

- Neighborhood of Richmond
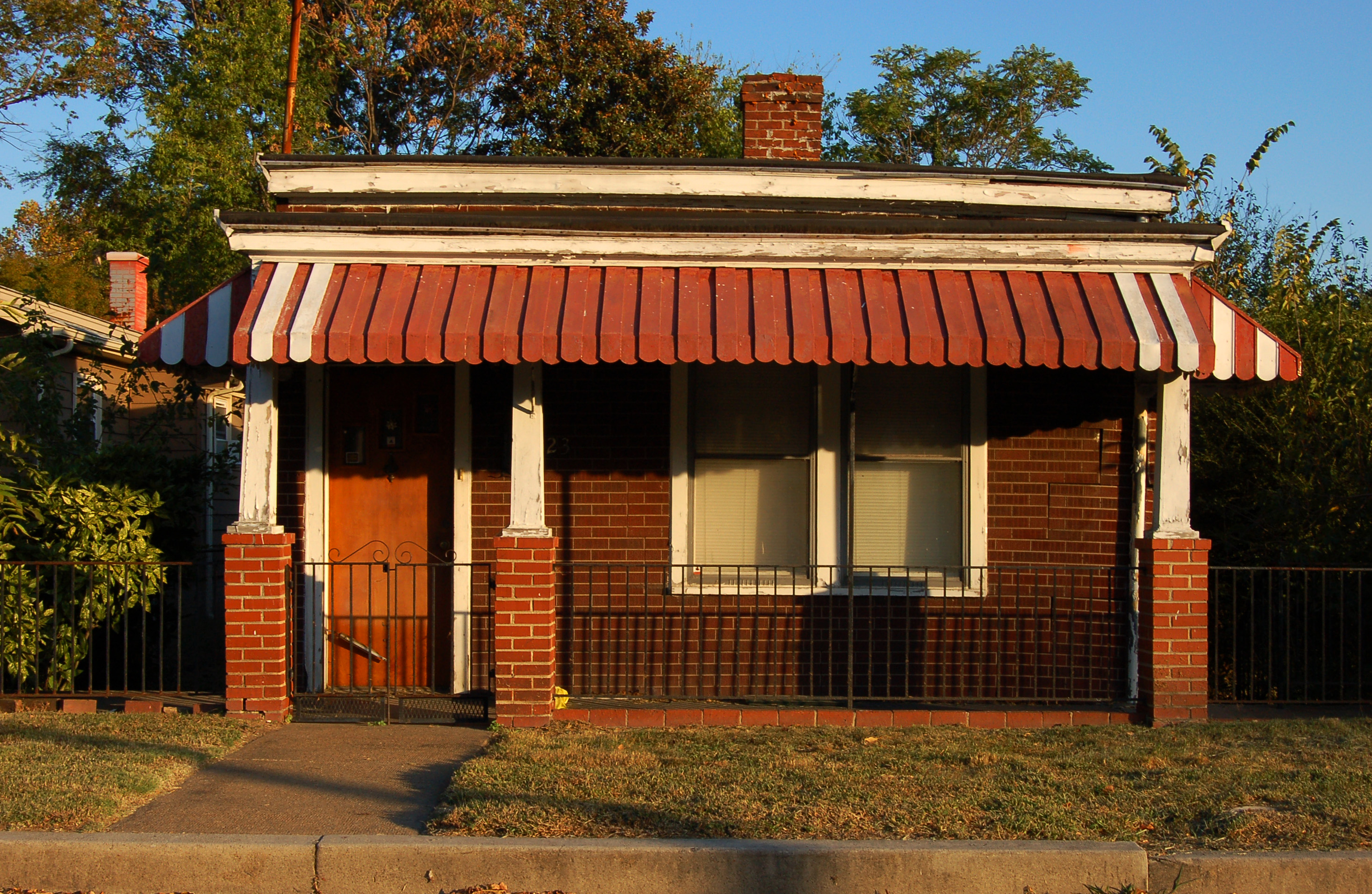
- A shotgun-style house in Shed Town.
- Interactive map of Shed Town
- Coordinates: 37.53018°N 77.40937°W
- Country: United States
- State: Virginia
- City: Richmond
- Settled: 1819
- Time zone: UTC−04:00 (Eastern Daylight Time)
  - Summer (DST): UTC−05:00 (Eastern Standard Time)
- ZIP code: 23231
- Area code: 804
- ISO 3166 code: 1
- Website: rockettsvillage.com

Shed Town is a neighborhood in the East End that overlaps Church Hill and Union Hill, Richmond, Virginia.

== History ==
The origin of the name "Shed Town" is unknown. It has been suggested that the name comes from early houses built in the neighborhood, which were occupied by shad-fishers, alluding to the name shed town. Others have suggested that the area received its name as it was used for storage sheds for bricklayers in Richmond. The first documented report of the town came in 1819 when George Winston and his brickyard workers of 26 identified themselves living in a town entitled "the shed town" in 1819 Richmond directory.

Only four buildings from the original shed town remain standing, primarily buildings located alongside North 32nd Street in the city. Shed Town has been described as the area inside of East Leigh Street, North 35th Street, P Street and N 29th Street.
