= Battery Court Historic District =

Historic district in Virginia, United States

- U.S. National Register of Historic Places
- U.S. Historic district
- Virginia Landmarks Register
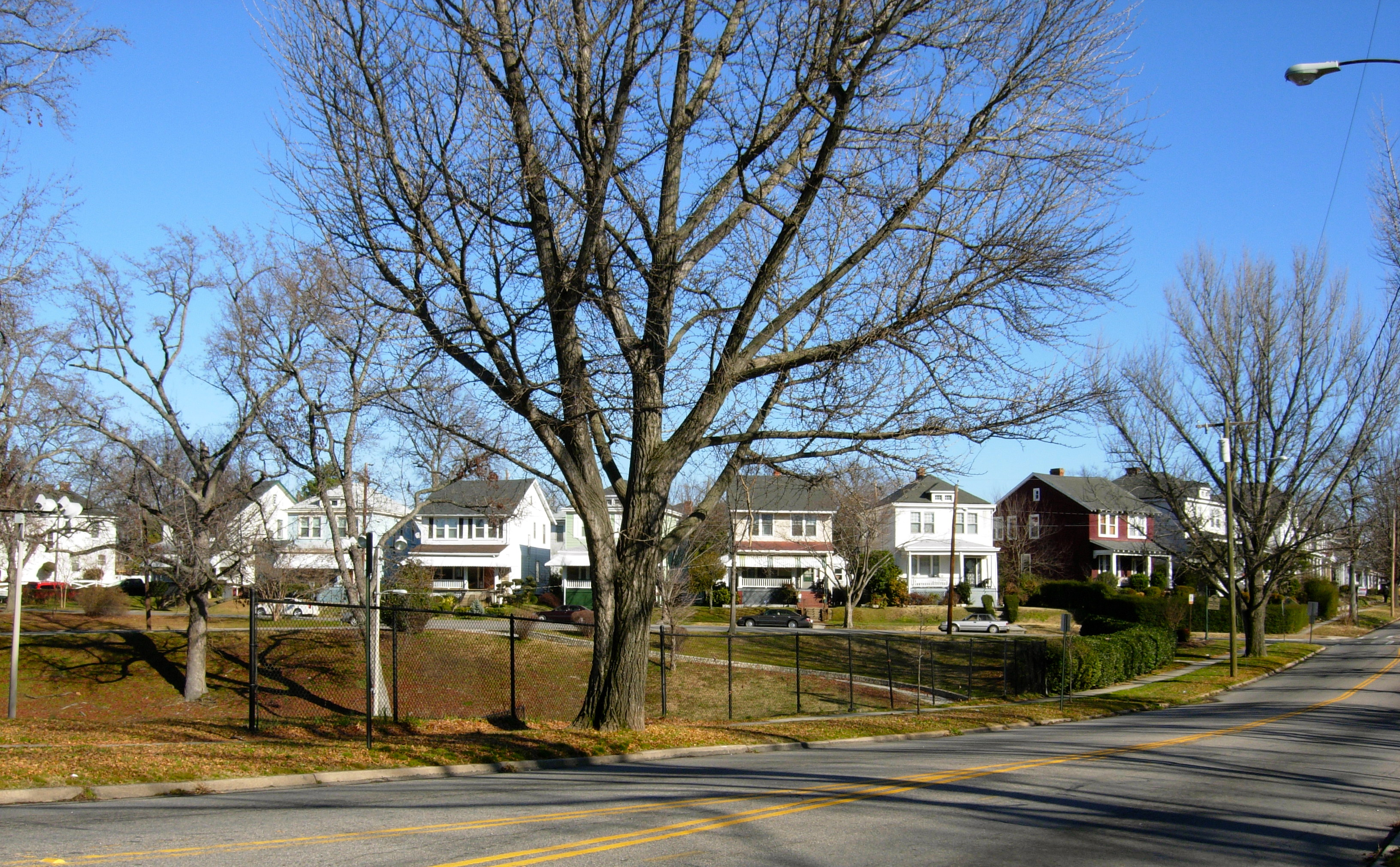
- Battery Court Historic District, January 2012

- Location within Virginia Location within the United States
- Location: Roughly Dupont C., Edgewood, Fendall, Greenwood, Griffin, Montrose, Moss Side, Noble, North, Edgehill, Graham., Richmond, Virginia
- Coordinates: 37°34′02″N 77°26′23″W
- Area: 181 acres (73 ha)
- Architectural style: Late 19th And 20th Century Revivals, Late 19th And Early 20th Century American Movements
- MPS: Streetcar Suburbs in Northside Richmond MPS
- NRHP reference No.: 02000594
- VLR No.: 127-5897

Significant dates
- Added to NRHP: October 9, 2003
- Designated VLR: September 30, 2001

The Battery Court Historic District is a national historic district located at Richmond, Virginia. The district encompasses 549 contributing buildings and 1 contributing site (Battery Park) located north of downtown Richmond and west of Barton Heights and Brookland Park. The primarily residential area developed starting in the early-20th century as one of the city's early “streetcar suburbs.” The buildings are in a variety of popular late-19th and early-20th century architectural styles including frame bungalows, American Foursquare, Colonial Revival, Tudor Revival, and Mission Revival. Notable non-residential buildings include the Overbrook Presbyterian Church (now All Souls Presbyterian) and Battery Park Christian Church (now Mount Hermon Baptist).

It was added to the National Register of Historic Places in 2003.
