= Creighton Court =

Neighborhood of Richmond, Virginia

Coordinates: 37.545284°N 77.398242°W

Creighton Court is a neighborhood in Richmond, Virginia's East End region. Creighton Court sits on the border between the City of Richmond and eastern Henrico County. The neighborhood is situated directly north of the Oakwood Cemetery and alongside the interchange of Virginia Route 33 (Nine Mile Road) and Interstate 64. North 29th Street and Creighton Road serve as the main arteries of the community. Richmond Redevelopment and Housing Authority redeveloped the housing into mixed-income units in 2022.

== See also ==
- Neighborhoods of Richmond, Virginia
- Richmond, Virginia
- Union Hill
