= Whitcomb Court =

Housing project in Richmond, Virginia

Coordinates: 37°33′21″N 77°24′55″W

Whitcomb Court is a public housing project in the East End part of Richmond, Virginia that is north of Union Hill. The housing project is tucked away by the interchange of U.S. Route 360 Mechanicsville Turnpike and Interstate 64. Whitcomb and Sussex St. serve as the spine of the community.

== Origins ==
Built in 1958, Whitcomb Court is the fourth oldest housing project out of six in Richmond. Housing projects in Richmond began sometime after the great depression in the 1940s. The moniker “Projects” is short for “slum clearance projects.” White authorities meant to demolish the African-American ghettos within Richmond and replace them with new “healthier” buildings. The project buildings replaced shanties without water or indoor plumbing, which existed prior to government intervention.

== See also ==
- Neighborhoods of Richmond, Virginia
- Richmond, Virginia
- Union Hill
