= Malvern Gardens =

- Neighborhood of Richmond
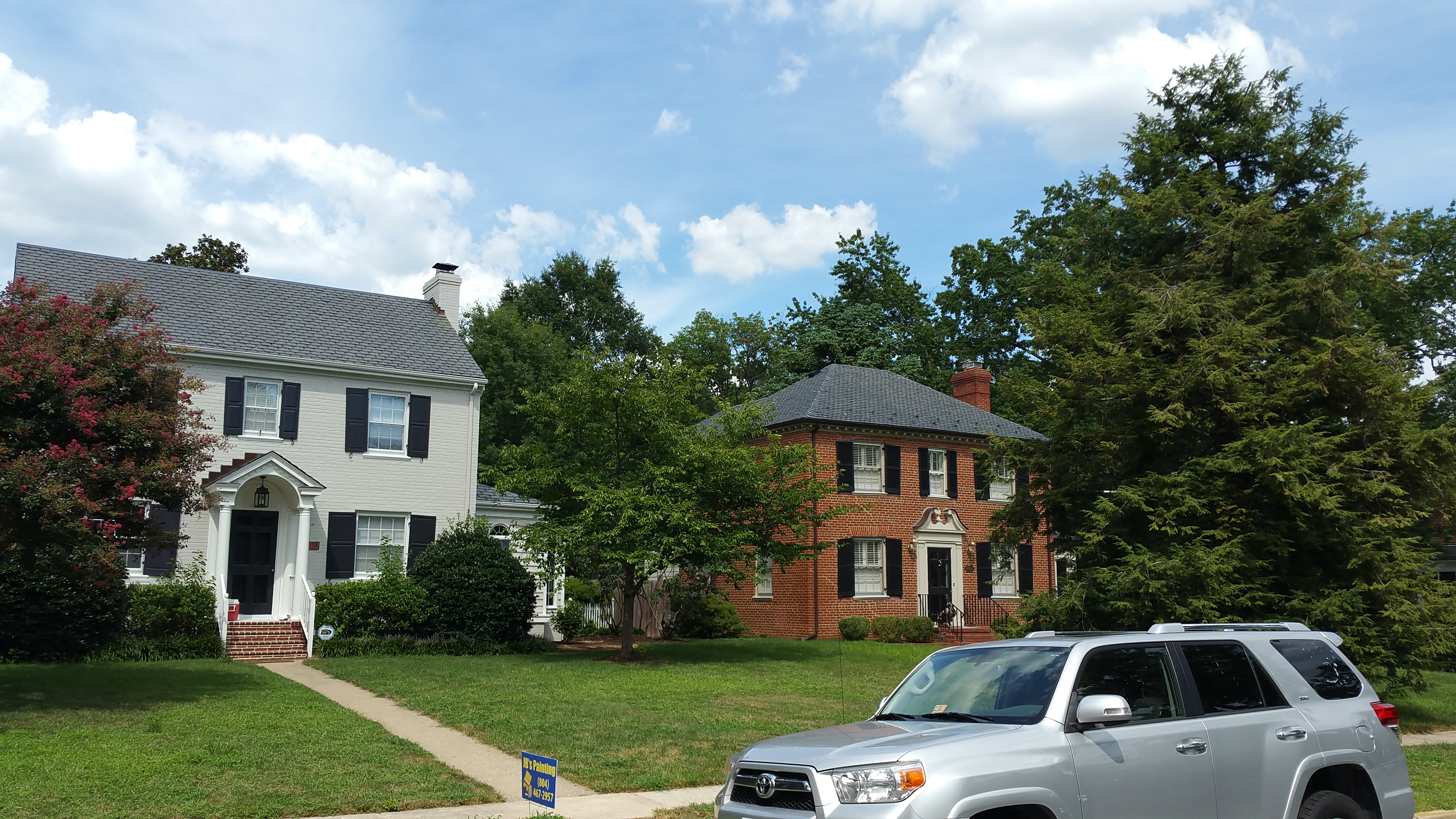
- Detached colonial homes in Malvern Gardens.
- Interactive map of Malvern Gardens
- Coordinates: 37°34′01.5″N 77°29′12.0″W
- Country: United States
- State: Virginia
- City: Richmond
- Time zone: UTC−04:00 (Eastern Daylight Time)
  - Summer (DST): UTC−05:00 (Eastern Standard Time)
- ZIP code: 23231
- Area code: 804
- ISO 3166 code: 1

Malvern Gardens is a small, upper-middle class neighborhood in the West End of Richmond, Virginia. The community began in the 1920s as part of the garden city urban planning movement, designed to create managed natural areas near to major cities.
