= Chamberlayne Industrial Center =

Coordinates: 37°35′51″N 77°26′27″W

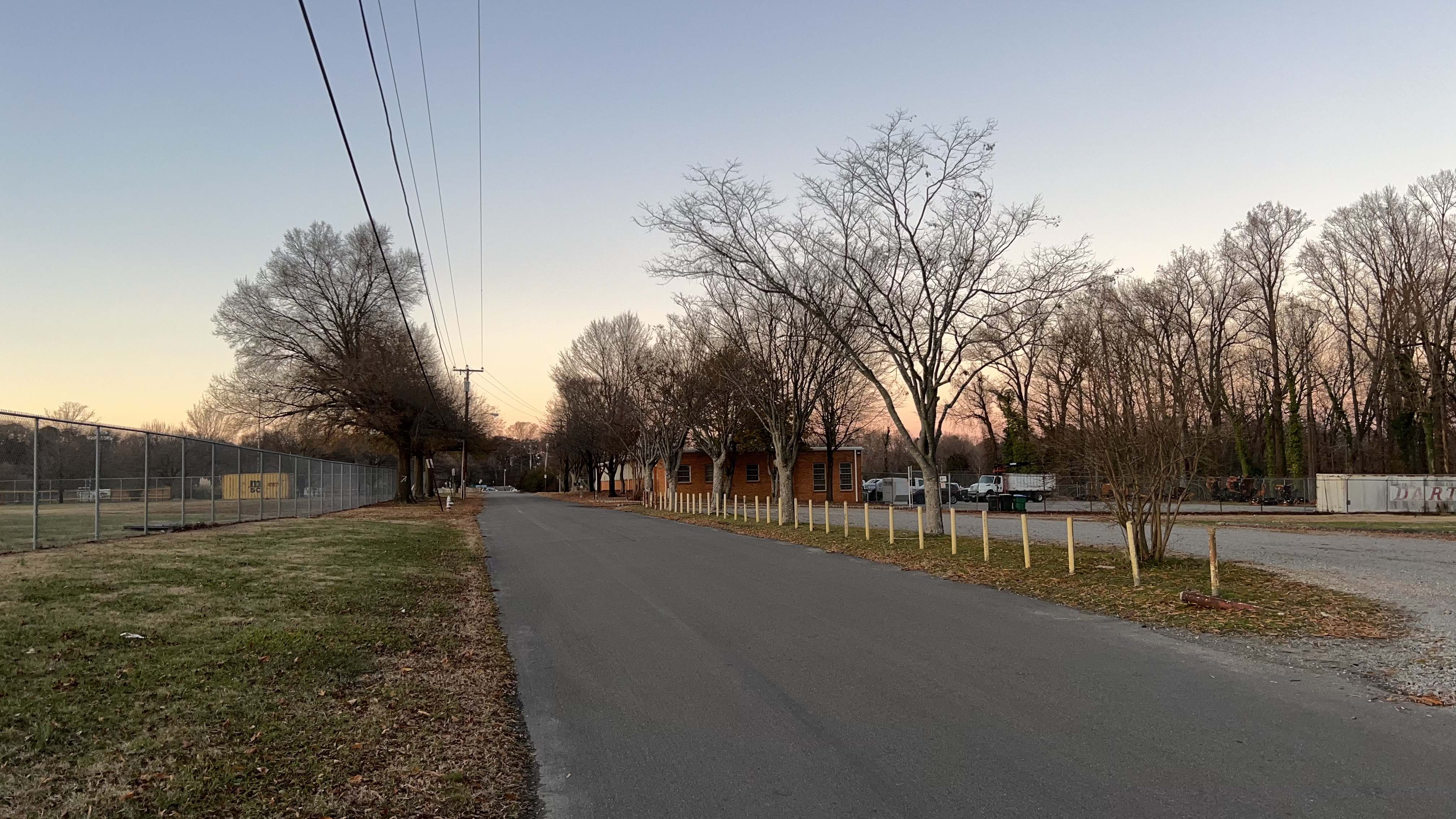
The Chamberlayne Industrial Center, near its non-main-road terminus.

The Chamberlayne Industrial Center, sometimes simply known as Chamberlayne, is a heavy industry district within the boundaries of Richmond, Virginia's North Side region. The neighborhood contains a mixture of residential, commercial industrial-zoned areas, but most of the residential and commercial buildings are in the eastern corner of the neighborhood. The neighborhood is named after Chamberlayne Avenue (U.S. Route 1) which serves as the spine for the neighborhood.

Chamberlayne lies just north of Interstate 64, Virginia Commonwealth University's Monroe Park campus, and the Carver neighborhood. It is southeast of Virginia Union University.

== See also ==
- Neighborhoods of Richmond, Virginia
- Magnolia Industrial Center – A second industrial district in the North Side of Richmond
