= Colonial Place, Richmond =

Coordinates: 37.564167°N 77.495833°W

Colonial Place
- Neighborhood of Richmond
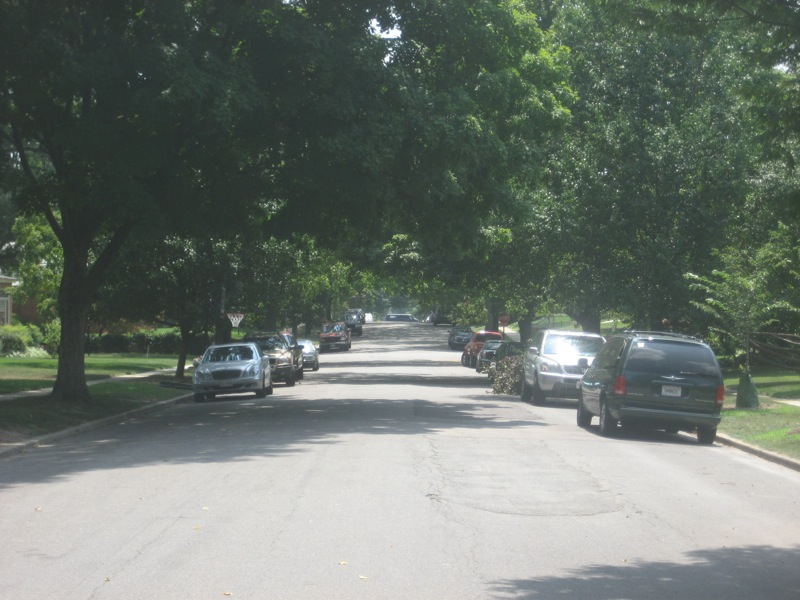
- Interactive map of Colonial Place
- Country: United States
- State: Virginia
- City: Richmond

Population (2020)
  - Total: 2,193
- Time zone: UTC−04:00 (Eastern Daylight Time)
  - Summer (DST): UTC−05:00 (Eastern Standard Time)
- ZIP code: 23231, 23226
- Area code: 804
- ISO 3166 code: 1

Colonial Place is a small neighborhood in the West End of Richmond, Virginia.
