= Washington Park, Richmond =

Neighborhood of Richmond, Virginia

Coordinates: 37.590°N 77.441°W

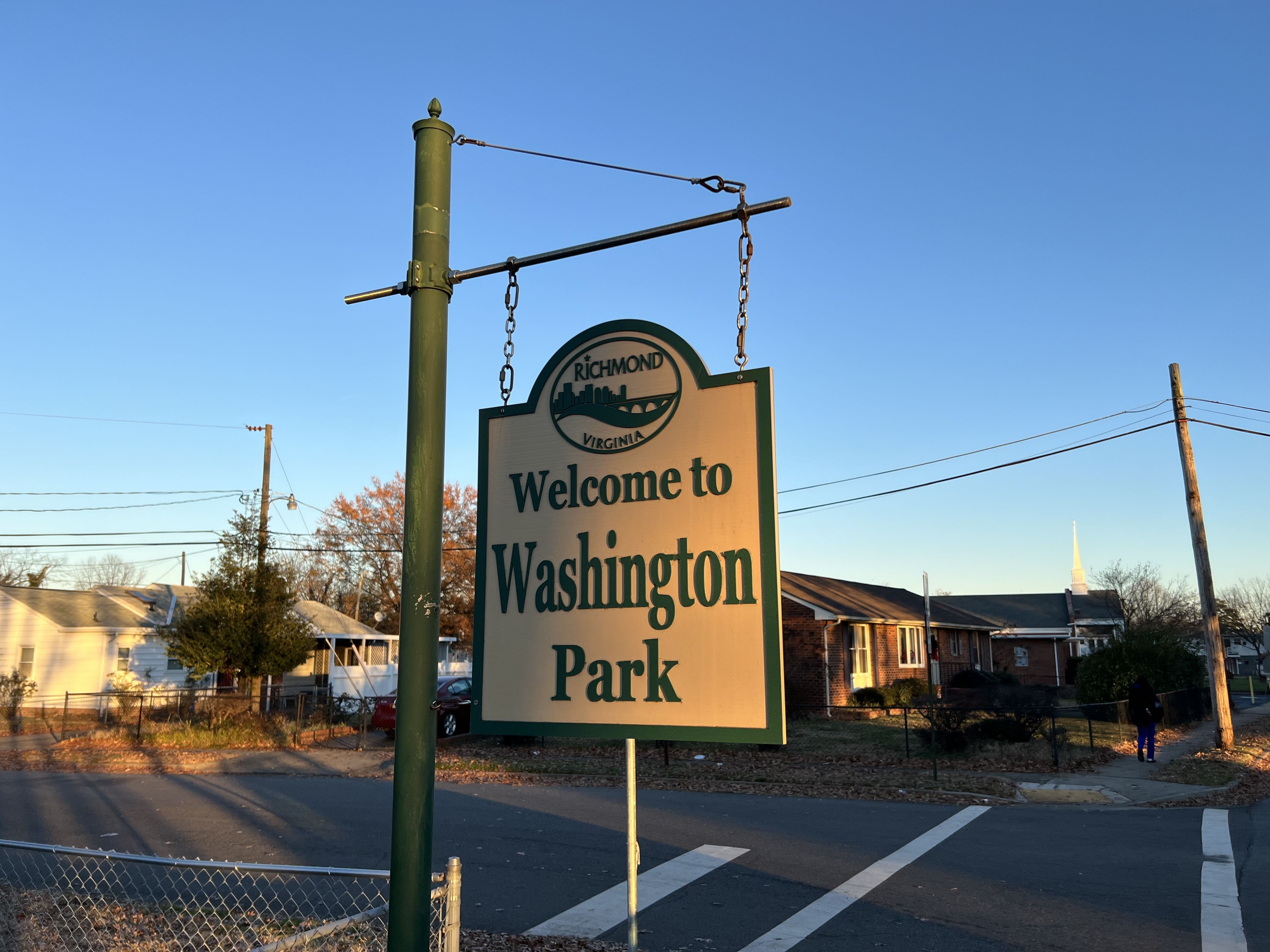
An entrance to the Washington Park neighborhood.

Washington Park is a neighborhood in Richmond, Virginia's North Side. The neighborhood lies west of the Forest Lawn Cemetery and the Richmond Raceway.
