= Mosby Court =

Neighborhood in Virginia, US

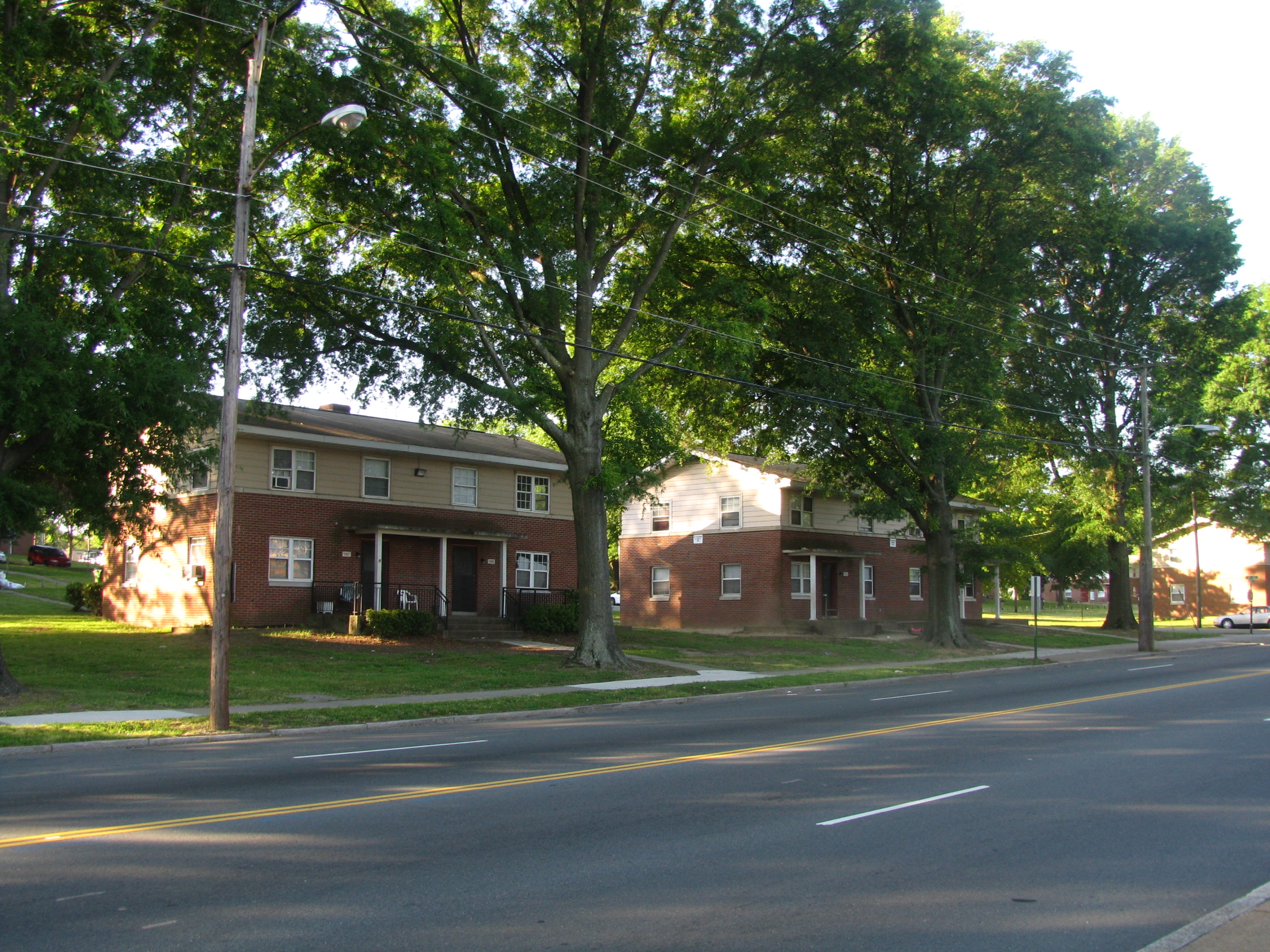
- Mosby Court in 2009
- Interactive map of Mosby Court

General information
- Location: East End, Richmond, Virginia, US
- Coordinates: 37°32′37″N 77°25′16″W
- Population: 10,000 (2022)
- No. of units: 458

Construction
- Constructed: 1962–1970

Refurbishment
- Refurbished: 2022

Other information
- Famous residents: StaySolidRocky

Mosby Court is a housing project and neighborhood in Richmond, Virginia. The neighborhood is named Mosby, while the housing project is named Mosby Court.

== Location ==
Mosby Court is located in the East End quadrant of Richmond, Virginia. Adjacent to the Richmond City Jail, Mosby Court is primarily served by Coalter Street, which accesses the community North 18th Street (U.S. Route 360). Directly south of the neighborhood is Martin Luther King Jr. Middle School.

== History ==
Mosby Court was first built between 1962 and 1970, and contains 458 units. The neighborhood is named after Benjamin Mosby, a 19th-century land developer.

As of 2022, Mosby Court has approximately 10,000 residents. In 2022, the city of Richmond redeveloped the housing projects, where they demolished the six largest housing units, replacing them with mixed-income units.

== Notable residents ==
- StaySolidRocky (born 2001), rapper

== See also ==
- Neighborhoods of Richmond, Virginia
