= Gambles Hill =

- Neighborhood of Richmond
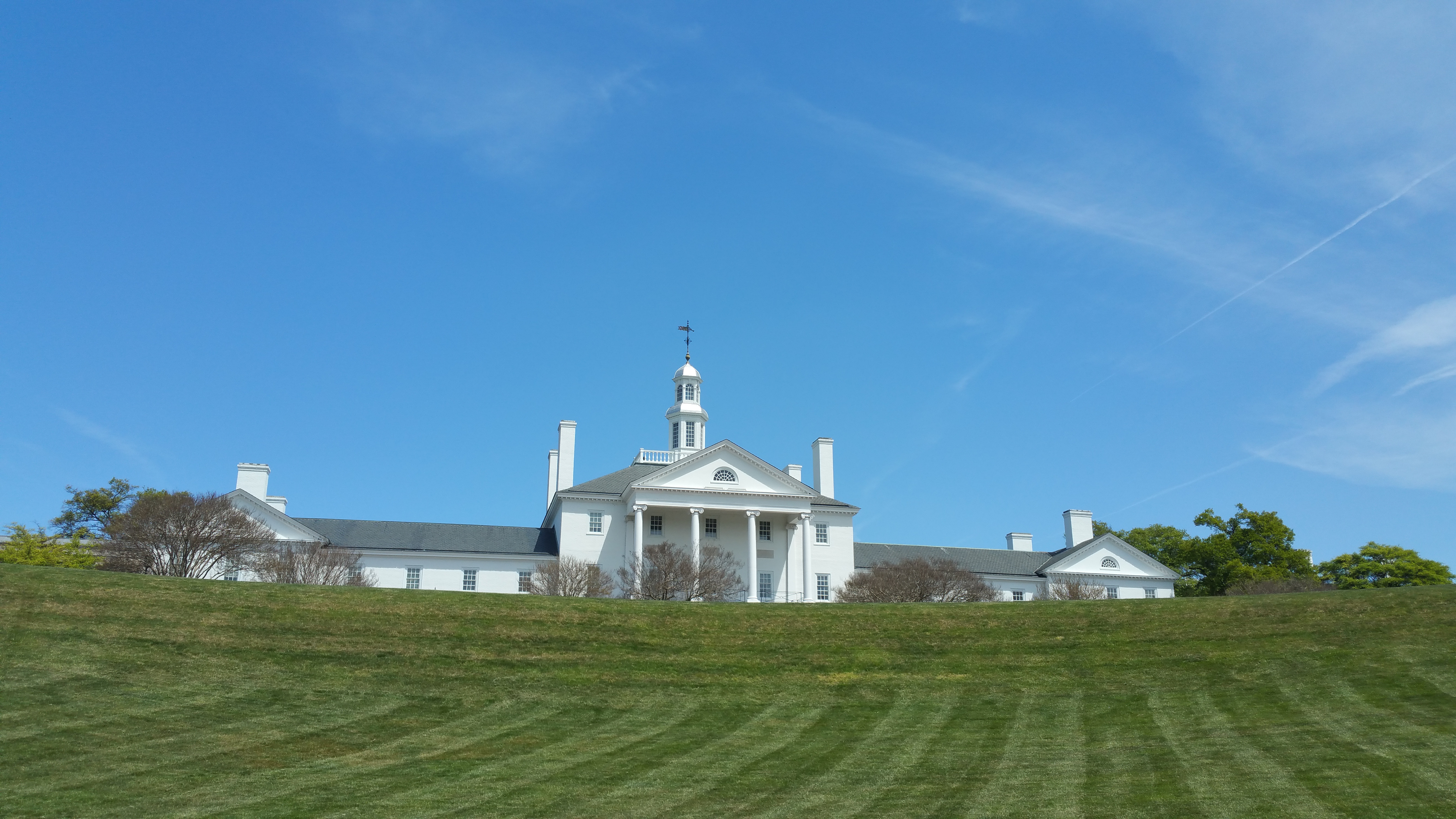
- The Ethyl Corporation Building, built in 1958, is an iconic structure in Gambles Hill.
- Interactive map of Gambles Hill
- Coordinates: 37°32′13″N 77°26′43″W
- Country: United States
- State: Virginia
- City: Richmond
- Settled: 1760
- Time zone: UTC−04:00 (Eastern Daylight Time)
  - Summer (DST): UTC−05:00 (Eastern Standard Time)
- ZIP code: 23230
- Area code: 804
- ISO 3166 code: 1

Gambles Hill is a neighborhood near Downtown Richmond, Virginia. The neighborhood contains the Virginia War Monument, Historic Tredegar, Brown's Island and the WestRock Corporation.

== History ==
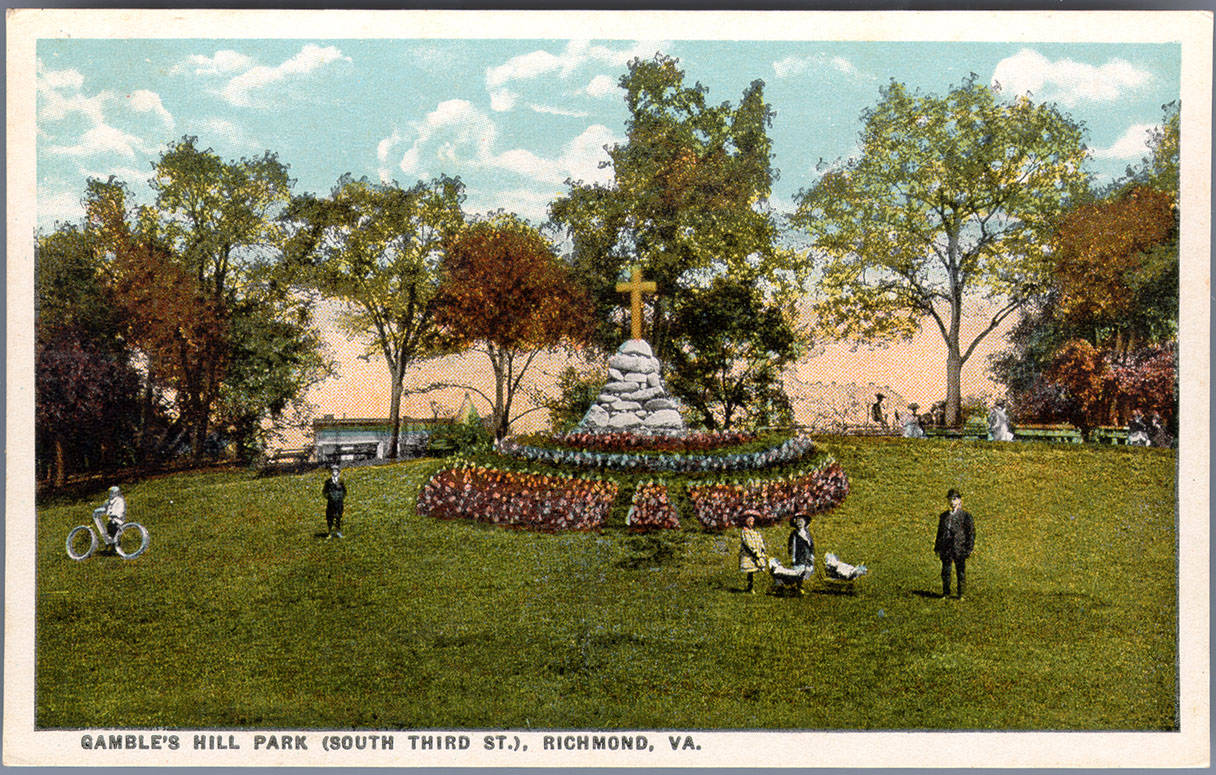
Gamble's Hill Park, early 20th century

Modern day Gambles Hill was first occupied by William Byrd III in 1760, where he built his estate atop what is now Gambles Hill. Nine acres of his estate was donated to Gambles Hill Park, which became one of the first public parks in Richmond. In 1800, John Harvie commissioned the construction of a house atop a hill overlooking the James River. Robert Gamble subsequently purchased the property from Harvie, alluding to the community's present day name. As part of the City Beautiful Movement, many of the homes in the neighborhood were destroyed to make way for public parks and gardens between Gamble's estate and the James River, and so that there was a view of the river from the mansion. In 1854 architect William Pratt constructed a castle among other houses atop Gambles Hill, which became known as Pratt's Castle.

Nearly a century later, in 1957, the Ethyl Corporation purchased six acres of property atop Gambles Hill, including Pratt's Castle. Pratt's Castle was ultimately destroyed and replaced with the Ethyl Corporation Building, a Classical Revival structure designed by Carneal and Johnston architects, and a landscape by Charles Gillette. Alluding to the history of the neighborhood the Ethyl Corporation wanted the complex to be a campus with various landscape architecture elements. Landscape architecture Gillette designed an open lawn lined with crape myrtles and a buffer of perimeter shrubs. To the rear of the building, Gillette installed a rectilinear garden with symmetrical parterres lined by oaks, magnolias, and brick walks. The structure still stands today and takes up a majority of the neighborhood. Several empty fields around the property remain open, where old neighborhoods were demolished.

== See also ==
- Neighborhoods of Richmond, Virginia
- Richmond, Virginia
