= Arts District, Richmond, Virginia =

Coordinates: 37.545910°N 77.442670°W

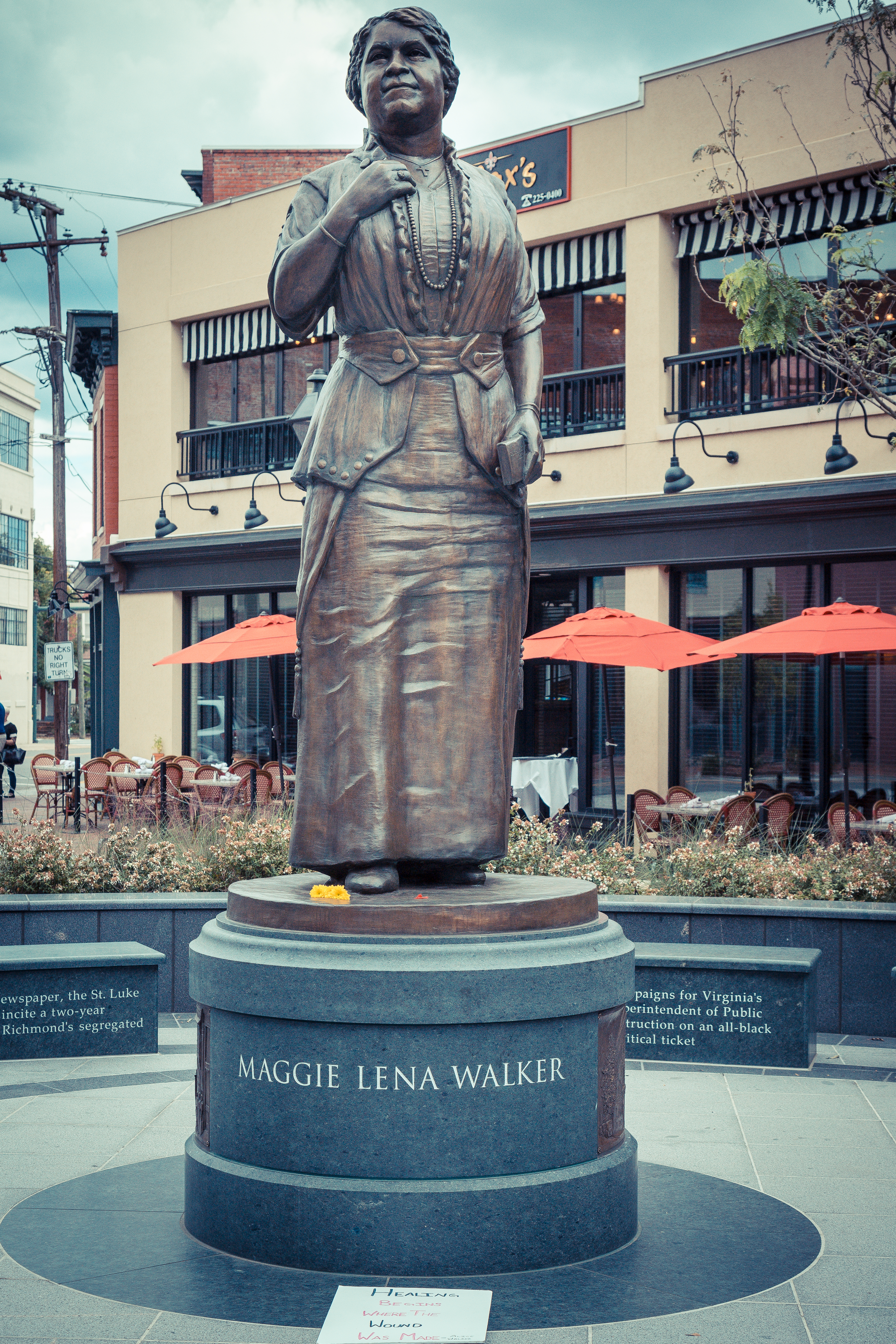
Maggie Walker statue in the Arts District

The Richmond Arts and Culture District stretches from the Institute for Contemporary Art on West Broad to the Virginia State Capitol and spans the Monroe Ward and Jackson Ward neighborhoods. The Arts District was designed to be the center of artistic, cultural, civic, and commercial activity. This district has worked to promote economic prosperity in this area of Richmond and create areas for art galleries and artist living spaces. This inclusive district offers a variety of experiences for all visitors and locals. The Arts District features and supports the history of the Jackson Ward neighborhood, the business activity along West Broad Street, the wide range of downtown art galleries, and eclectic dining and shopping experiences. The District is the first of its kind in the city of Richmond but state law allows there to be more than Arts District in each city.

The Arts District is the home of the monthly First Fridays Art Walk. First Fridays is held the first Friday evening of every month, people are able to wander the Arts District and visit the art galleries and shops that are staying open late. The event features street performances, live music, gallery openings and special deals at stores.

== Anchors and Major Attractions ==
- Maggie Walker Museum
- Valentine Museum
- Black History Museum
- Gallery 5
- Candela Books & Gallery
- Coliseum
- Convention Center
- Library of Virginia
- Center Stage
- Ghost Print Gallery
- The National
- State Capitol and Visitors Center
- Downtown _{Collections} Public Library & Special
- The Hippodrome
- VCU Institute for Contemporary Art
- Art 6
- The Renaissance Conference Center
- 1708 Gallery
- Quirk Gallery
- ada Gallery
- Visual Art Studio
- Metro Sound and Music Recording
- Theater IV
- Barksdale Downtown
- UR Downtown Campus
- John Marshall House Museum
- Richmond Ballet
- Museum of the Confederacy
- Sound of Music Recording Studios
- Several notable restaurants and cafes
- Richmond Symphony

== See also ==
- Neighborhoods of Richmond, Virginia
- Richmond, Virginia
