= Pine Camp, Richmond, Virginia =

Neighborhood of Richmond, Virginia

Coordinates: 37.602120°N 77.447620°W

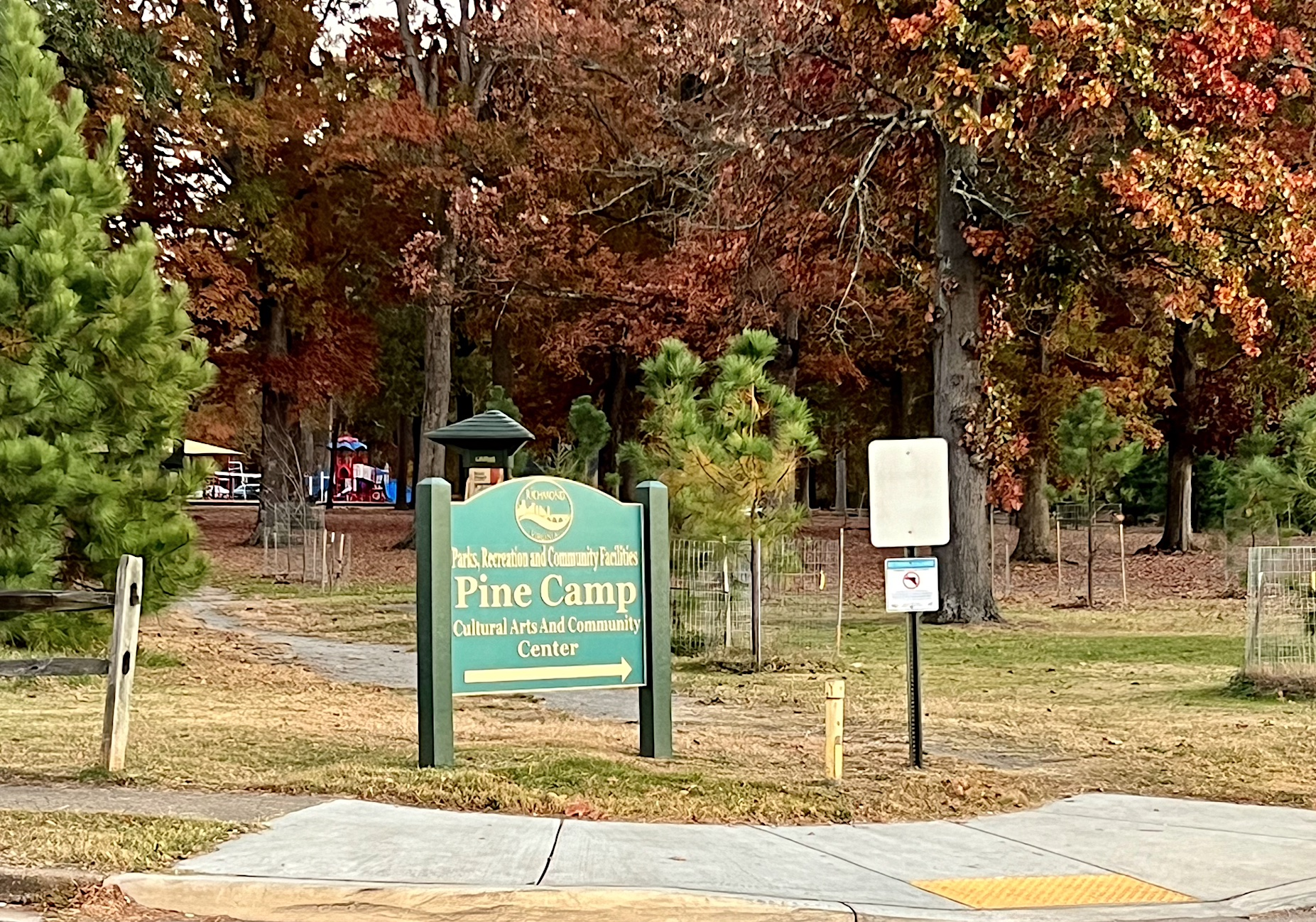
Pine Camp Community Center sign

Pine Camp is a neighborhood in Richmond, Virginia's North Side. The area is heavily forested, and houses the Pine Camp Community Center, one of the largest recreation centers in Northern Richmond. The neighborhood is north of John Marshall High School and west of the Forest Lawn Cemetery.
