= Green Park, Richmond, Virginia =

Neighborhood of Richmond, Virginia

Coordinates: 37°34′06″N 77°25′36″W

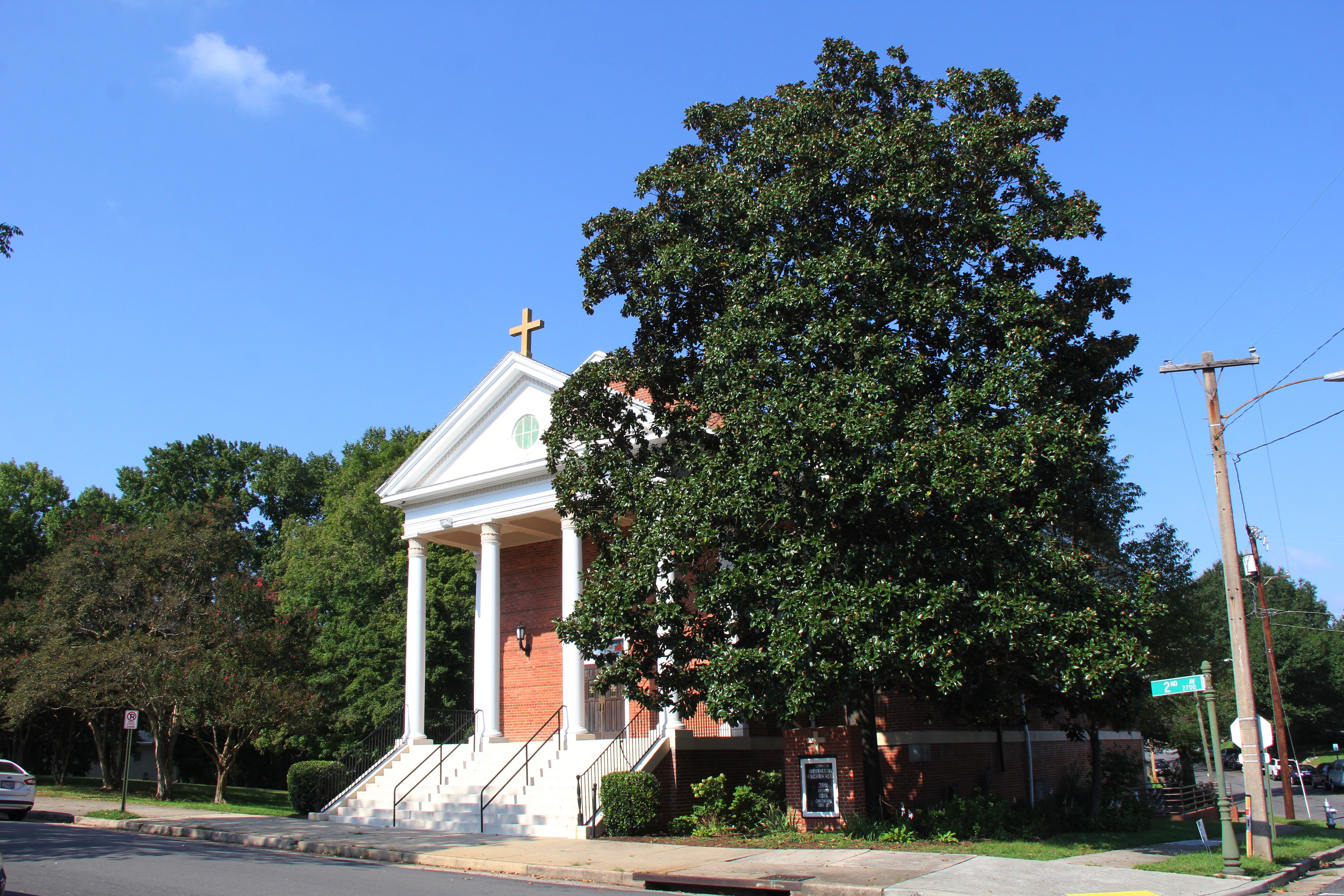
St. Elizabeth's Catholic Church.

Green Park is a small neighborhood of approximately 240 homes located in Richmond, Virginia, United States. The neighborhood is within the boundaries of the North Side of the city limits.

Community landmarks include the Cannon Creek Greenway, a bike/walking trail which will eventually join the East Coast Greenway, Hotchkiss Field, and historic St. Elizabeth's Catholic Church, which is the home parish of Senator Tim Kaine and his family.

== Boundaries ==
The Green Park neighborhood is bounded to the north by Brookland Park Boulevard, and to the south by property owned by the Richmond Public School System/Overby-Sheppard Elementary School. Its eastern boundary is Richmond-Henrico Turnpike and the Cannon Creek Greenway. It is bounded to the west by 2nd Avenue.

== History ==
The community was founded in the late 1800s. In 1892, Joseph P. Fourqurean and Thomas C. Ruffin began selling lumber, coal and feed from their business in what would become Green Park. Fourqurean & Ruffin eventually became a wood mill, and their products were used in the construction of the neighborhood that sprung up around the business, which later became Ruffin & Payne and relocated outside the area.

The first homes in the neighborhood were constructed in the late 19th century, with a second major building spurt of brick houses occurring during the early 20th century. This continues into the early years of the Depression, when building effectively ceased in the neighborhood for a decade. A third major phase of homes was built in the early 1950s as housing was made available to G.I.s returning from WWII and their families.

== Architectural styles and notes ==
Earlier homes in Green Park are of the Queen Anne, American Foursquare, American Craftsman and American Colonial styles of architecture. Homes built in the 1950s were built in the Saltbox style.

Today, many homes in Green Park are still adorned with their original oak woodwork; much of it spectacular, with floor-to-ceiling newel posts, hand constructed paneled wainscoting, molding, oak floors and built-in Chippendale corner cabinets. A few homes retain their original iceboxes and unusual plastered interior walls, scored to resemble brickwork.

== Greenspace and wildlife ==
Green Park contains a significant amount of wetlands and wooded area which is home to wildlife such as white tailed deer, coyotes, geese and herons. The eastern branch of Cannon Creek, much of it subterranean, runs through the center of the neighborhood.
