= Biotech and MCV District =

Coordinates: 37.543623°N 77.430829°W

The Biotech and MCV District is the community that surrounds the MCV Campus of Virginia Commonwealth University in Downtown Richmond, Virginia.

== See also ==
- Neighborhoods of Richmond, Virginia
- Richmond, Virginia
- Virginia Commonwealth University
