= Brookland Park Historic District =

Historic district in Virginia, United States

- U.S. National Register of Historic Places
- U.S. Historic district
- Virginia Landmarks Register
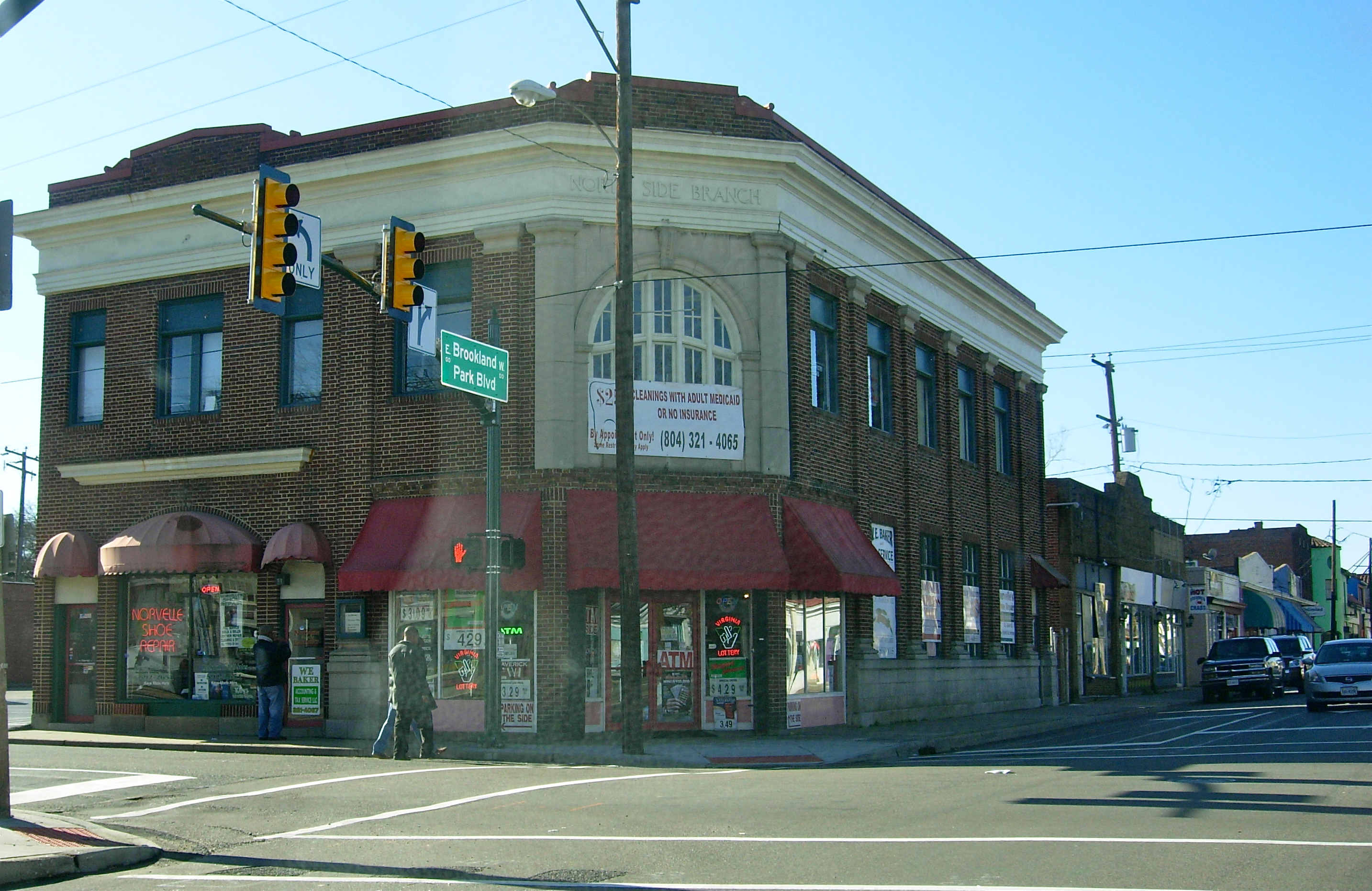
- Brookland Park Historic District, January 2012

- Location within Virginia Location within the United States
- Location: Roughly Griffin, Fendall, Hanes, Garland, North, Barton, Lamb, Cliff Aves., Norwood, Hooper, Essex, Brookland Park., Richmond, Virginia
- Coordinates: 37°34′58″N 77°26′51″W
- Area: 343 acres (139 ha)
- Architectural style: Late 19th And 20th Century Revivals, Late 19th And Early 20th Century American Movements
- MPS: Streetcar Suburbs in Northside Richmond MPS
- NRHP reference No.: 02000591
- VLR No.: 127-5898

Significant dates
- Added to NRHP: August 6, 2003
- Designated VLR: September 30, 2001

The Brookland Park Historic District is a national historic district located at Richmond, Virginia. The district encompasses 1,157 contributing buildings located north of downtown Richmond and Barton Heights.

== Background ==
The primarily residential area developed starting in the late-19th century as one of the city's early “streetcar suburbs.” The buildings are in a variety of popular late-19th and early-20th century architectural styles including frame bungalows and American Foursquare. The neighborhood is characterized by frame dwellings with a single-story porch spanning the facade, and either Colonial Revival or Craftsman in style, moderate in scale, with understated materials and stylistic expression. Notable non-residential buildings include the North Side Branch building, Brookland Inn, former A&P Grocery Store, North Side Junior High School, Barack Obama Elementary School, St. Paul's School building (1923), St. Philip's Episcopal Church, First African Baptist Church (1922), and Garland Avenue Baptist Church.

It was added to the National Register of Historic Places in 2003.
