= Gilpin, Richmond, Virginia =

Neighborhood of Richmond, Virginia

Coordinates: 37°33′09″N 77°26′03″W

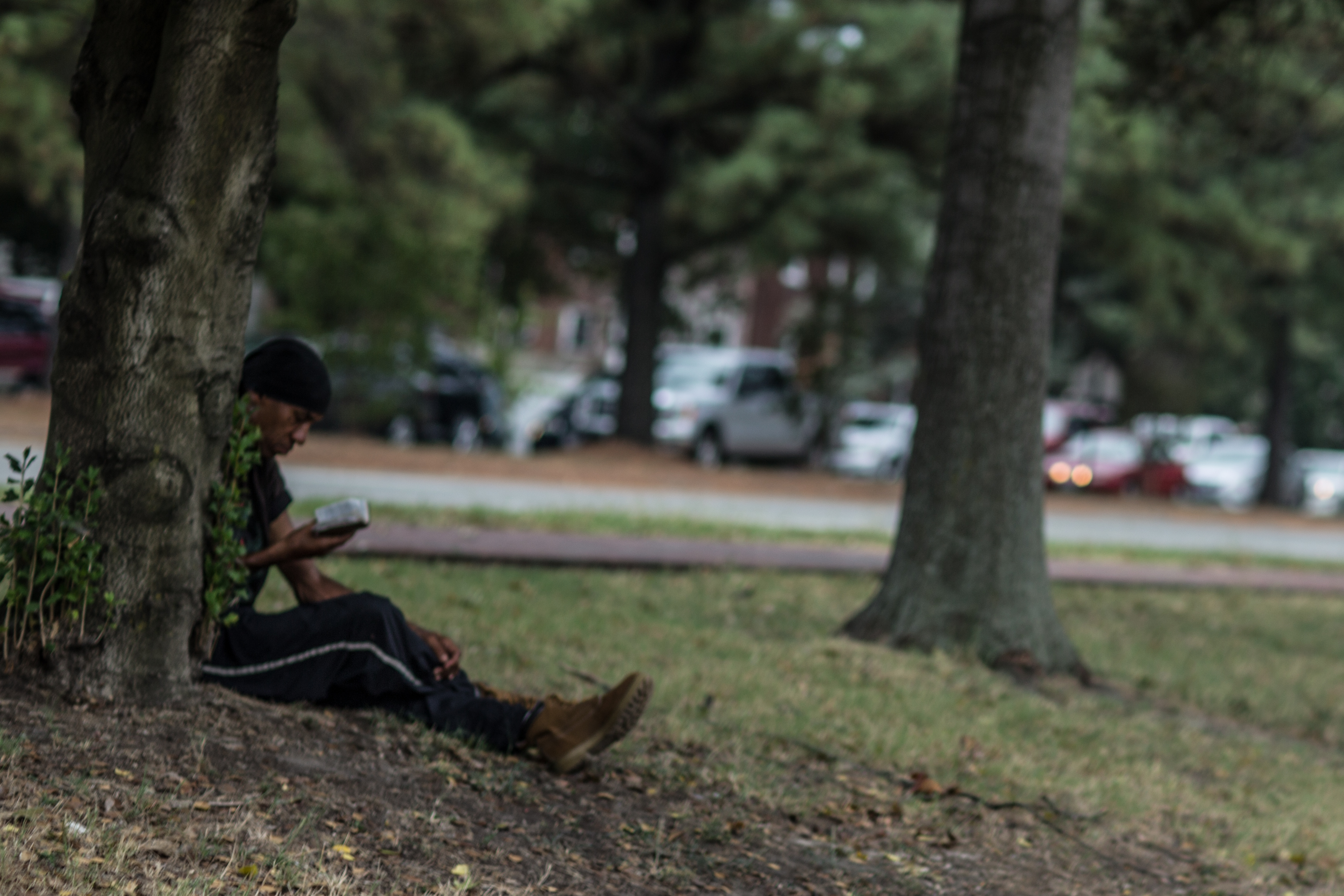
A man sitting against a tree in the neighborhood.

Gilpin is a small neighborhood located in Richmond, Virginia and within the boundaries of the North Side of the city limits. Originally part and parcel of the historically Black neighborhood of Jackson Ward, the northern section of that neighborhood was heavily redeveloped with the provision of public housing from the mid-20th century onwards, with the major development taking the name "Gilpin Court". During the same period, a massive expansion of highway building around and through central Richmond saw the Gilpin Court and the rest of the neighborhood essentially cut off from the rest of Jackson Ward.

The community of Gilpin lies adjacent to the interchange of Interstates 64 and 95, and houses three cemeteries: Hebrew Cemetery, Shockoe Hill Cemetery, and the long invisible Shockoe Hill African Burying Ground. The headquarters for the Richmond Department of Redevelopment and Housing are situated in the neighborhood along with the Richmond Alternative School.

Most of the western part of the neighborhood is occupied with higher density structure, but housing becomes less dense towards the eastern part of the community.

== High-Rise for the Elderly ==
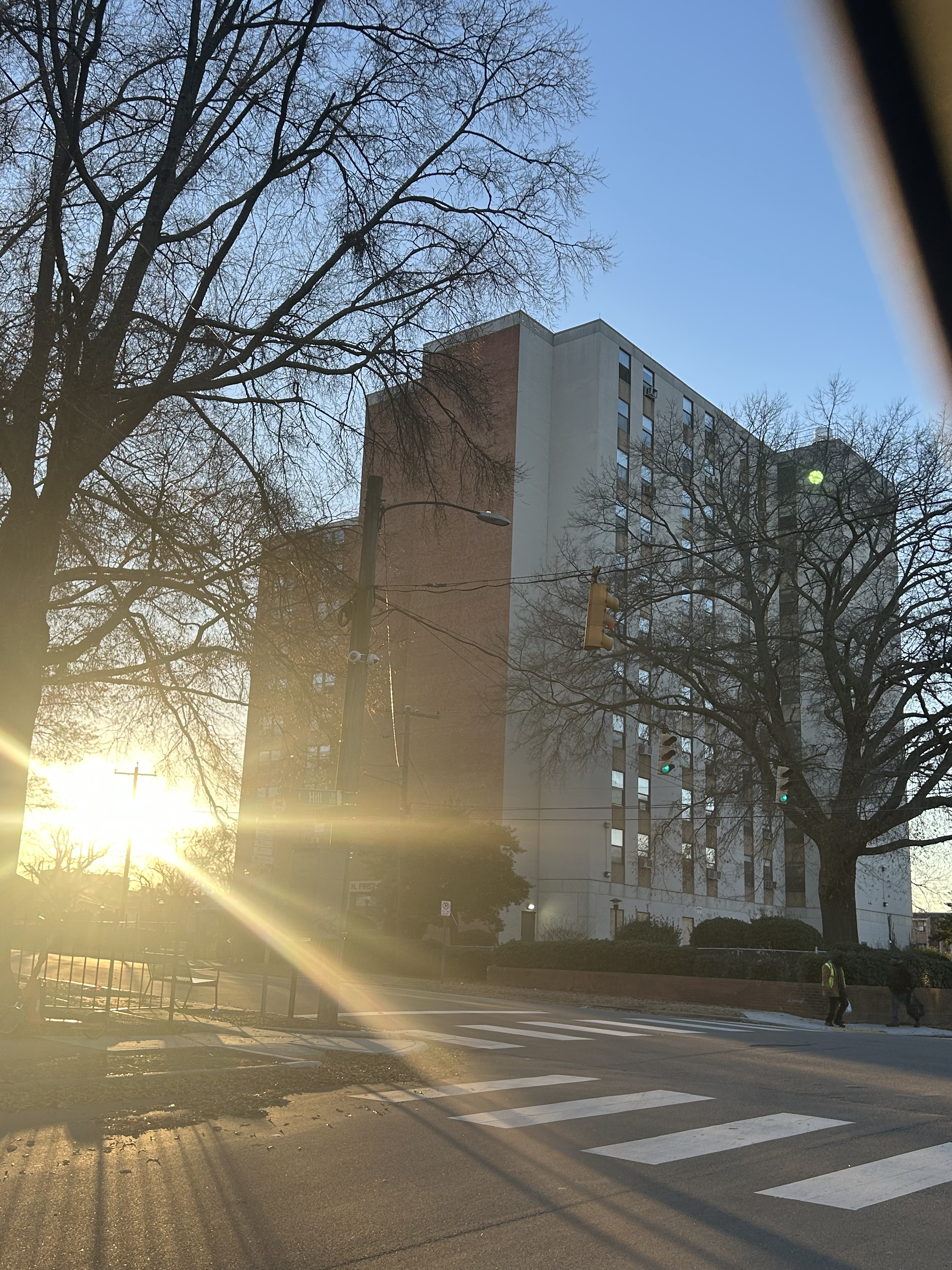
Frederic A. Fay Towers

The High-Rise for the Elderly, also known as the Frederic A. Fay Towers, is an 11-story apartment complex with 200 units. It was constructed by the Richmond Redevelopment and Housing Authority (RRHA) in 1971 as part of a national push to build housing for low-income elderly individuals. It is representative of the impacts of the Housing Act of 1949. Seniors in the building were provided with increased accessibility, safety, and activities that increased their overall quality of life. RRHA also offered group activities and transportation to residents.
