= Pratt's Castle (Richmond, Virginia) =

Historic house in Virginia, United States

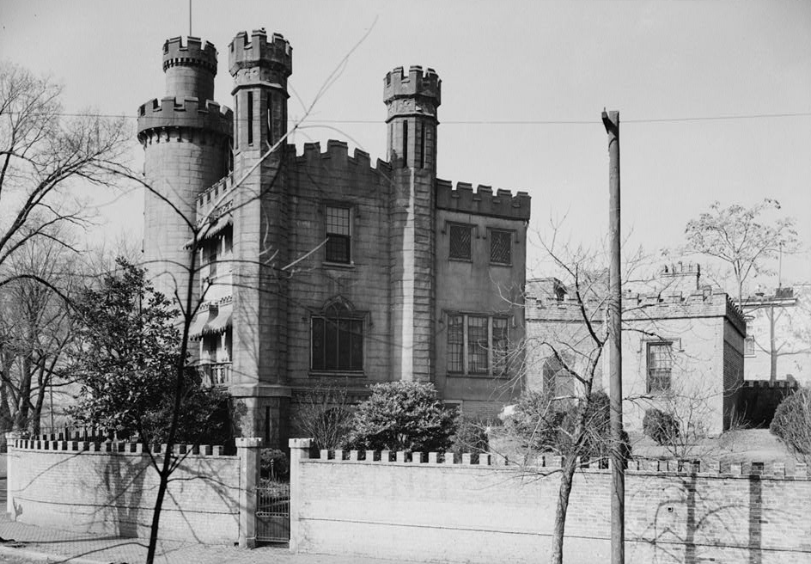
- Photograph of Pratt's Castle for the Historic American Buildings Survey, circa 1930s (Library of Congress)

General information
- Architectural style: Gothic Revival
- Coordinates: 37°32′13″N 77°26′43″W
- Completed: 1854

Design and construction
- Architect(s): William Pratt

Pratt's Castle was a home located in the historic Gambles Hill neighborhood of Richmond, Virginia. Built in 1854, the structure was a rare Virginia example of Gothic Revival architecture.

== History ==
In 1853–1854, architect William Pratt constructed a castle among other houses atop Gambles Hill, which became known as Pratt's Castle. Pratt modeled the castle after the estates of his Scottish ancestors. The castle was highly visible from Oregon Hill in Richmond and considered a notable local landmark.

The castle was noted for its opulent exterior and interior craftsmanship. The place was built on a foundation of James River granite with a wooden structure covered by rolled sheet metal from Tredegar Iron Works, which was embossed and painted to resemble stone. The building was constructed with crenelated towers, its entrance hall and parlor included stained cathedral glass, it was filled with Gothic decorations and contained a dungeon in the basement, and its construction included a number of hidden passageways and secret staircases. In one room, while standing on the hidden stairs, one could look into the room below through the eyes of a painting on a wall.

Pratt's Castle was the home of General Charles Henningsen during the American Civil War. For a period in the early 1900s, the home was owned by Samuel H. Cornick and his wife Henrietta, the daughter of Mayor of Richmond Joseph C. Mayo. During a two-day 1940s open house, an estimated 14,000 people visited the castle.

In 1957, the Ethyl Corporation purchased six acres of property atop Gambles Hill, including Pratt's Castle. Despite local Richmond preservationists' objections, Pratt's Castle was ultimately destroyed and replaced with the Ethyl Corporation Building, a Classical Revival structure designed by Carneal and Johnston architects, and a landscape by Charles Gillette.
