= Upper Shockoe Valley =

Neighborhood of Richmond, Virginia

Coordinates: 37°32′37″N 77°25′32″W

Upper Shockoe Valley is a neighborhood in Richmond, Virginia that straddles alongside Interstate 95. The name is given based on the Shockoe River Valley created within the boundaries of the neighborhood.

== See also ==
- Neighborhoods of Richmond, Virginia
- Richmond, Virginia
