= Brookbury, Virginia =

Unincorporated community in Virginia, US

Coordinates: 37°27′51″N 77°29′29″W

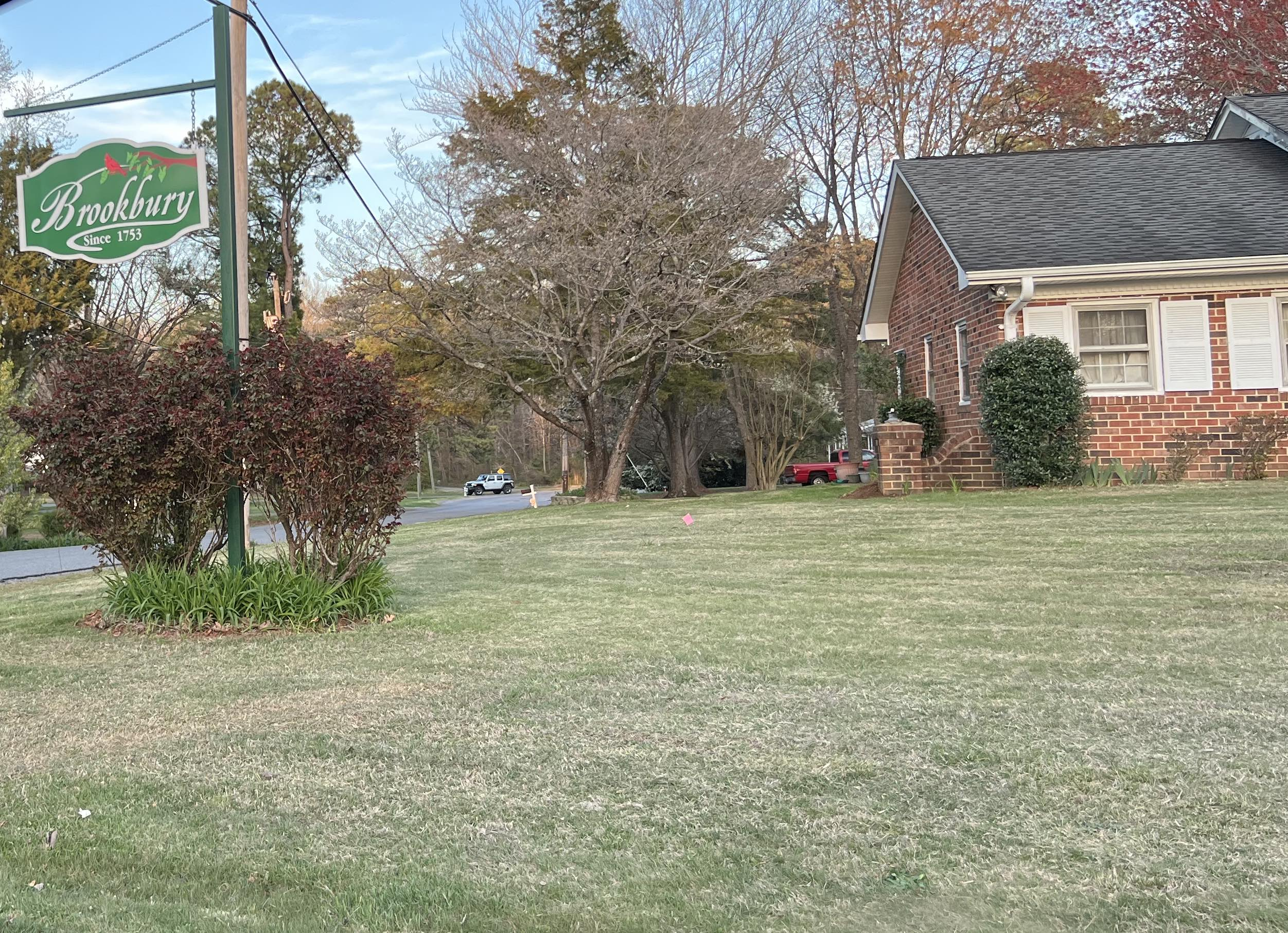

Brookbury is a neighborhood in Richmond, in the U.S. state of Virginia.
