= South Richmond, Richmond, Virginia =

Place south of the James River in Richmond, Virginia

Coordinates: 37°31′21″N 77°26′29″W

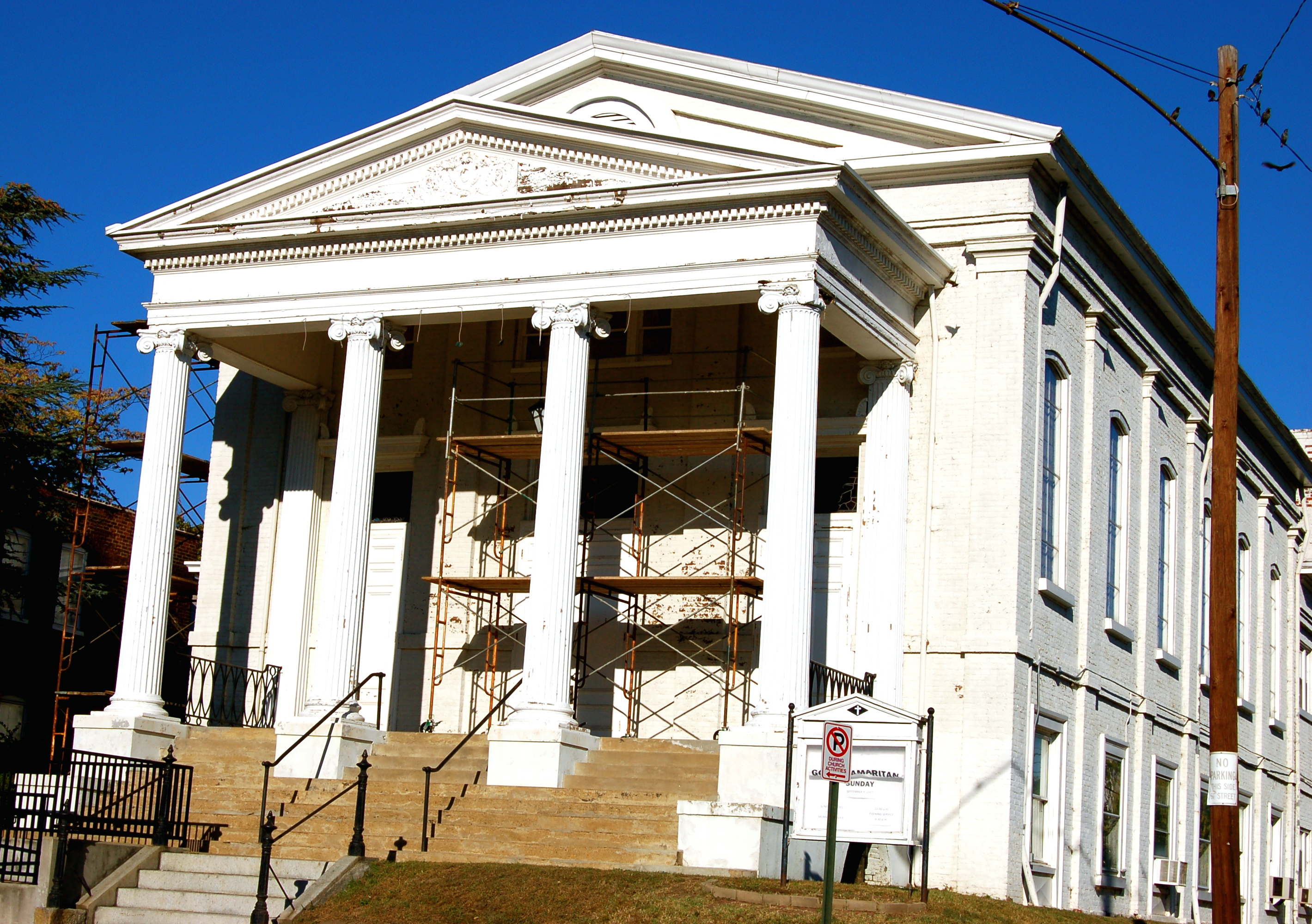
The former Good Samaritan Baptist Church in South Richmond, Virginia.

South Richmond is an area within the city of Richmond in the U.S. state of Virginia. It is on the south side of the James River, across from Richmond's downtown.
