= Fairmount, Richmond, Virginia =

- Fairmount Historic District
- U.S. National Register of Historic Places
- U.S. Historic district
- Virginia Landmarks Register
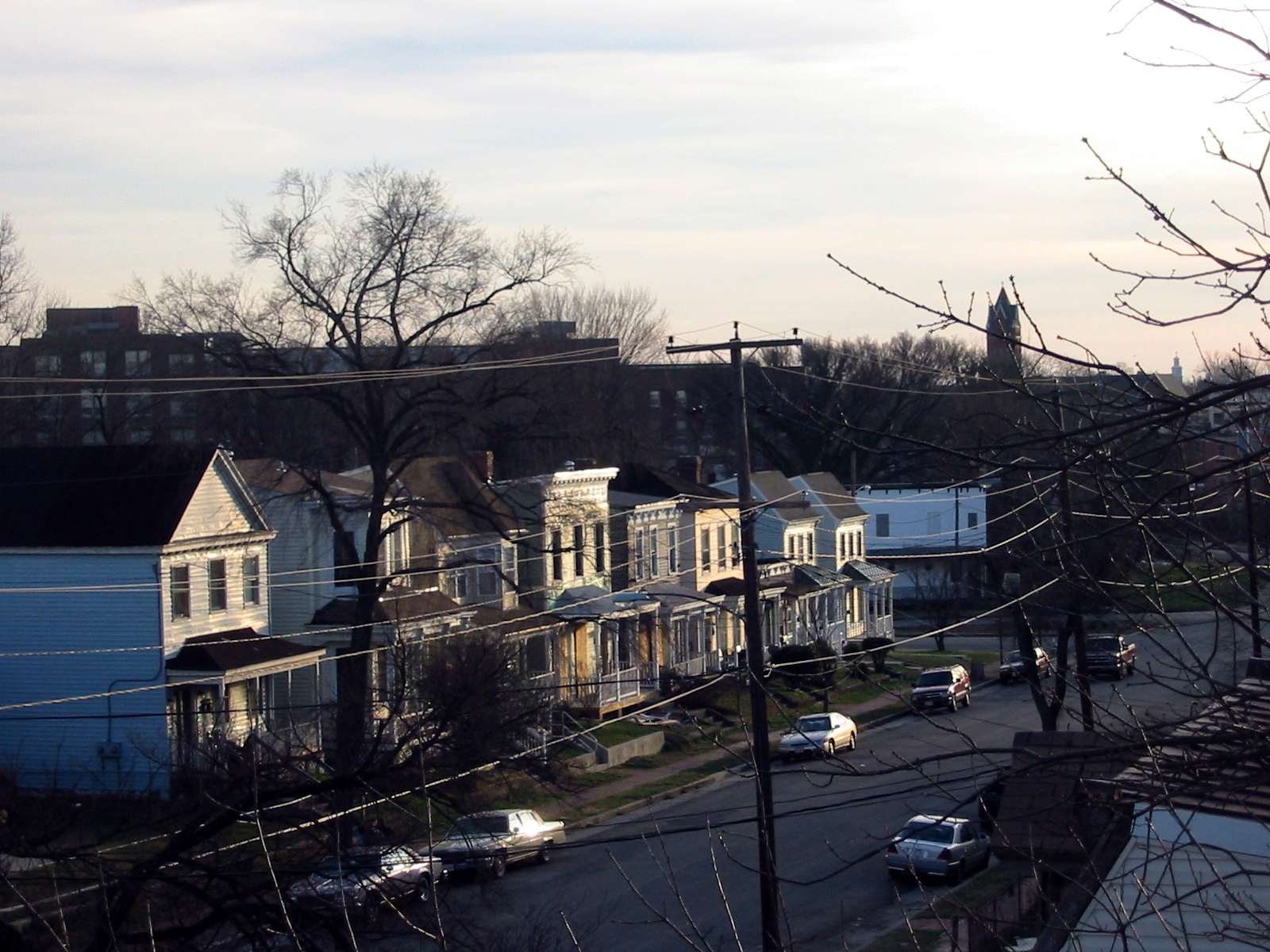

- Location within Virginia Location within the United States
- Location: Roughly bounded by 24th, Y, 20th, T, R, Q & P Sts., Fairfield & Carrington Aves., & Mechanicsville Tpk., Richmond, Virginia
- Coordinates: 37°32′43″N 77°24′47″W
- Area: 99 acres (40 ha)
- Built: 1890
- Architect: Wright, Cain, Robinson, Huntt, Wise; Pollard, James Fox and Son
- Architectural style: Italianate, Queen Anne, Bungalow Craftsman
- NRHP reference No.: 08000075
- VLR No.: 127-0814

Significant dates
- Added to NRHP: February 19, 2008
- Designated VLR: December 5, 2007

Originally a trolley car suburb in the years just before the dawn of the 20th century, the Fairmount neighborhood in Church Hill, Richmond, Virginia, is located just north of Union Hill. Much of the neighborhood was developed from the 1890s to the 1920s, and its buildings largely reflect Queen Anne, Italianate, and 1920s bungalow architecture. What is likely the oldest remaining residence, a frame house, probably dates from before 1870. A notable property in the Fairmount neighborhood is the Fairmount School. Annexed from Henrico County in 1906, Fairmount was first incorporated as an independent town on March 10, 1902 (though the area had actually been established some time in the years 1889-1893).

The boundaries are roughly east of Mosby Street, north of Carrington, west of 24th/25th Streets, and towards Fairfield Avenue. Across Fairmount Avenue, it is the bulk of the area east of the Brauers neighborhood and west of 24th.

In February 2008, the Fairmount Historic District was officially listed on the National Register of Historic Places. The City of Richmond has made available a map of the historic district and the Virginia Department of Historic Resources has released the application to the registry, an illustrated version of which tells the history of the neighborhood with supporting maps and images.
