= Hermitage Road Historic District =

Historic district in Virginia, United States

- U.S. National Register of Historic Places
- U.S. Historic district
- Virginia Landmarks Register
- Richmond City Historic District
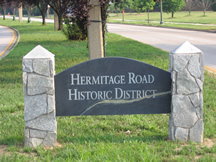
- HRHD sign near the Laburnum and Hermitage intersection

- Location within Virginia Location within the United States
- Location: 3800–4200 blocks of Hermitage Rd. Richmond, Virginia
- Coordinates: 37°35′2.94″N 77°27′45.17″W
- Built: 1894
- Architect: D. Wiley Anderson
- Architectural style: Late Victorian, Late 19th and 20th Century Revivals
- NRHP reference No.: 06000031
- VLR No.: 127-6076

Significant dates
- Added to NRHP: February 9, 2006
- Designated VLR: December 7, 2005

Hermitage Road Historic District (HRHD) is a Northside neighborhood in the independent city of Richmond, Virginia. The district is a Richmond Old and Historic District, as well as being listed on the Virginia Landmarks Register and the National Register of Historic Places.

The historic district consists of properties built in different architectural styles (Victorian, Tudor, Arts and Crafts, Georgian, Colonial Revival, etc.) located in the 3800 to 4300 blocks of Hermitage Road, this portion of which is designated as State Route 161, which crosses over Interstate 95 at the north end of the 4300 block.

== Boundaries ==
The south end of the district is at the intersection of Laburnum Avenue and Hermitage Road, which was formerly marked by the A.P. Hill Monument. The monument had stood at the intersection from the neighborhood’s creation until 14-Dec-2022 when the final remains of AP Hill were removed for re-burial in Culpeper County, Virginia. The AP Hill monument was the last major Richmond City owned monument to be de-constructed, a process which began with the George Floyd protests in Richmond, Virginia in 2020.

Also at the south end of the district is the 13 Acres house, which was donated by the Blair family with the intention of providing a permanent green space in the city. The house is currently used by the Richmond Public School system.

The north end of the district is at the intersection of Hermitage Road and Westbrook Avenue near the Freeman Marker No. 34, which marks the outer defense line for the City of Richmond during the Civil War.

== Origins of the neighborhood ==
The area was originally developed as one of Richmond's Northside streetcar suburbs. Most of the original concrete poles used for the overhead trolley wiring are still located in the median of the street and are still in service after over 100 years. The streetcar line extended to Lakeside Park in Henrico County, terminating at the present site of Lewis Ginter Botanical Garden.

== Creation of the Historic District ==
In 1988, the historic district was formed in response to a move by a local organization to tear down two historic houses (one, an excellent example of the Romanesque Revival style, was built in the 1890s). The people of the neighborhood "blocked the wrecking ball" and quickly formed a City Old and Historic District. The goal of the district is the protection and preservation of historic resources through zoning enforcement along Hermitage Road.

The HRHD Association continues to have active participation from homeowners and cooperates with other nearby neighborhood associations, such as Bellevue and Rosedale.
