= Fulton Hill =

Neighborhood of Richmond, Virginia

Coordinates: 37°30′56″N 77°23′54″W

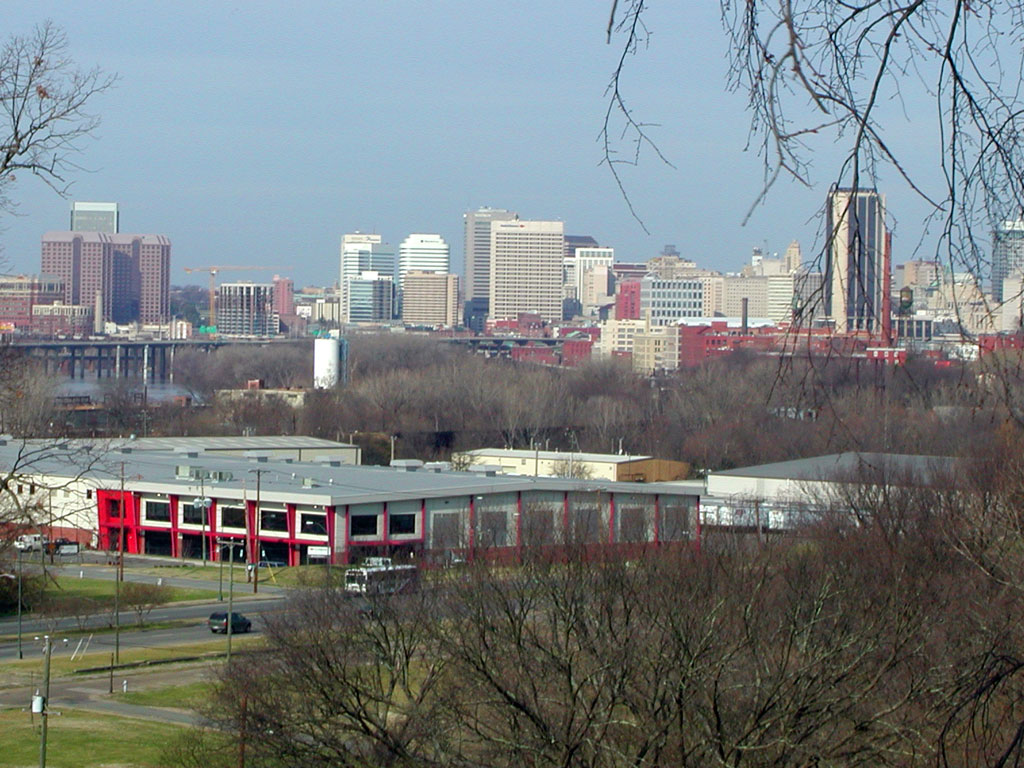
View of Richmond skyline from Powhatan Hill Park

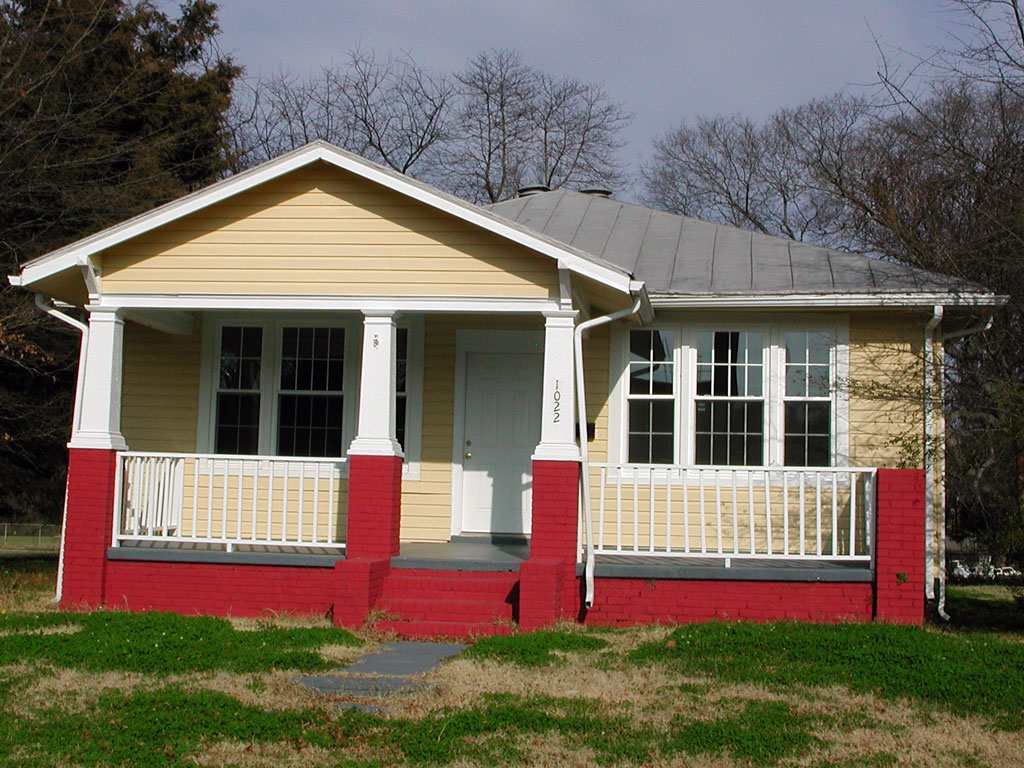
Example of Fulton Hill's most characteristic housing form, the bungalow

Fulton Hill is a neighborhood located in the East End of Richmond, Virginia. The name is used for the area stretching from Gillies Creek to the Richmond city limits. The Greater Fulton Hill Civic Association includes Fulton Bottom, part of Montrose Heights and part of Rocketts. Fulton Hill is south of Church Hill and Shockoe Bottom, north of Varina, east of the James River, and west of Sandston. The zip code is 23231.

== History ==
This Richmond neighborhood was named for Irish-born James Alexander Fulton, who married Eliza Mayo about 1800 and built a large estate atop current day Powhatan Park. In the 17th century the park was once home to Powhatan Village consisting of twelve dwellings. Tradition holds that Christopher Newport and John Smith first met with Parahunt, Powhatan's son, in May 1607 at this point. In the early 18th century, a ferry was established from a property at the bottom owned by Robert Rocketts to connect the north and south sides of the James River. A neighborhood of low-slung, single-story homes emerged here after the Civil War, and the area was annexed by Richmond from Henrico County in 1905. By the 1960s, the area at the base of the hill bordering Gilies Creek was mostly home to low and middle income African Americans. The housing stock was regarded as rather shabby, and after very severe flood damage in the early 1970s, many residents took Uniform Relocation Assistance and Real Property Acquisition Act (1970) money and relocated elsewhere in the city. Eventually, the entire Fulton Bottom community was completely demolished, marking Richmond's only neighborhood-wide urban renewal slum clearance.

Residents were promised rehabilitation and new construction, but the space once occupied by Fulton lay empty for a full decade before construction of moderate-income housing began. Many regard the failure to replace the razed housing in Fulton as one of the central failures of the city's urban renewal plans.

== Fulton Hill Today ==
The area above the floodplain is an intact urban neighborhood, with a working class character and population. The area is seeing renovation and rehabilitation on the upswing after years of neglect, thanks in large part to dedicated community action to tackle criminal activity, and also to rising property prices in other parts of the city. Fulton Hill's population is primarily African American, but an increasing number of white residents have purchased homes in the neighborhood in recent years, making the neighborhood one of Richmond's most diverse.

Neighborhood businesses, most of which are located along Williamsburg Road, include a bank branch, several convenience stores and service stations, and other stores and restaurants. It also includes a longtime community nonprofit, the Neighborhood Resource Center.

Fulton is home to the east coast hub for Stone Brewing.

Fulton Hill has a large stock of early 20th-century vernacular homes, especially one- and 1 1/2-story bungalows, but it also includes a number of increasingly trendy Sears Catalog homes and several semi-detached Federal rows that date to the earlier years of settlement.

The neighborhood is also home to Richmond National Cemetery, a veteran's cemetery dating to the Civil War with 9,322 interments. An album by the band Alabama Thunderpussy is named "Fulton Hill" after the community.
