= East End (Richmond, Virginia) =

Quadrant of Richmond, Virginia

- Quadrant of Richmond, Virginia
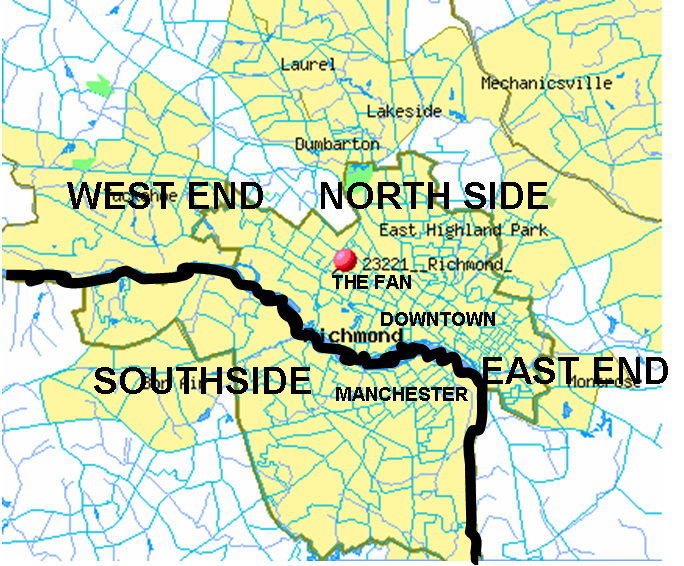

- Location within Virginia
- Coordinates: 37°32′8″N 77°24′32″W
- Country: United States
- State: Virginia
- City: Richmond

The East End of Richmond, Virginia is the quadrant of the City of Richmond, Virginia, and more loosely the Richmond metropolitan area, east of the downtown.

== Geographic boundaries ==
Within the city, and in Henrico County, East End is roughly defined as including the area of Richmond north of the James River and east/northeast of the former Virginia Central Railroad - Chesapeake and Ohio Railway line (now owned by CSX Transportation and operated by the Buckingham Branch Railroad) which originated at Main Street Station, and south and west of I-295.

Within the city, this includes neighborhoods such as Church Hill, Fairmount, Union Hill, Fulton, Powhatan Hill, Fulton Hill, Montrose Heights, Fairfield Court, Creighton Court, Whitcomb Court, Mosby Court, Eastview, Brauers, Peter Paul, Woodville, North Church Hill, Chimborazo and Oakwood.

The terminology "East End" also broadly includes much of eastern Henrico County as a portion the Richmond Metropolitan area. Communities outside the city limits in this area include the census-designated places of Highland Springs, Montrose, Sandston, and Varina.

A portion of Hanover County, primarily in the Mechanicsville area also meets the above geographic description, and may be considered by some to be part of the East End of Metropolitan Richmond, though is equally considered outside of the quadrant system, due to its separation from the city by the Chickahominy River and swamp.

== History and development ==
In the era just before and as European settlement began at the turn of the 17th century, near Powhatan Hill, a place known as "Powhatan" which was the village or "town" that Wahunsunacock (who has become better-known as the Chief Powhatan) came from was located. An early capital of the Powhatan Confederacy, "Powhatan" was also the name used by the natives to refer to the James River).

The East End contains a number of notable cemeteries, including the Confederate Cemetery of Oakwood, the historic African-American Evergreen Cemetery, and the Richmond National Cemetery. The East End is also home to the famous St. John's Church, where Patrick Henry delivered his "Give Me Liberty" speech.

As of the 2020s, the area is a target for urban renewal and investment.

== See also ==
- Neighborhoods of Richmond, Virginia
