= Barton Heights =

Historic area in Richmond, Virginia, United States

- Town of Barton Heights Historic District
- U.S. National Register of Historic Places
- U.S. Historic district
- Virginia Landmarks Register
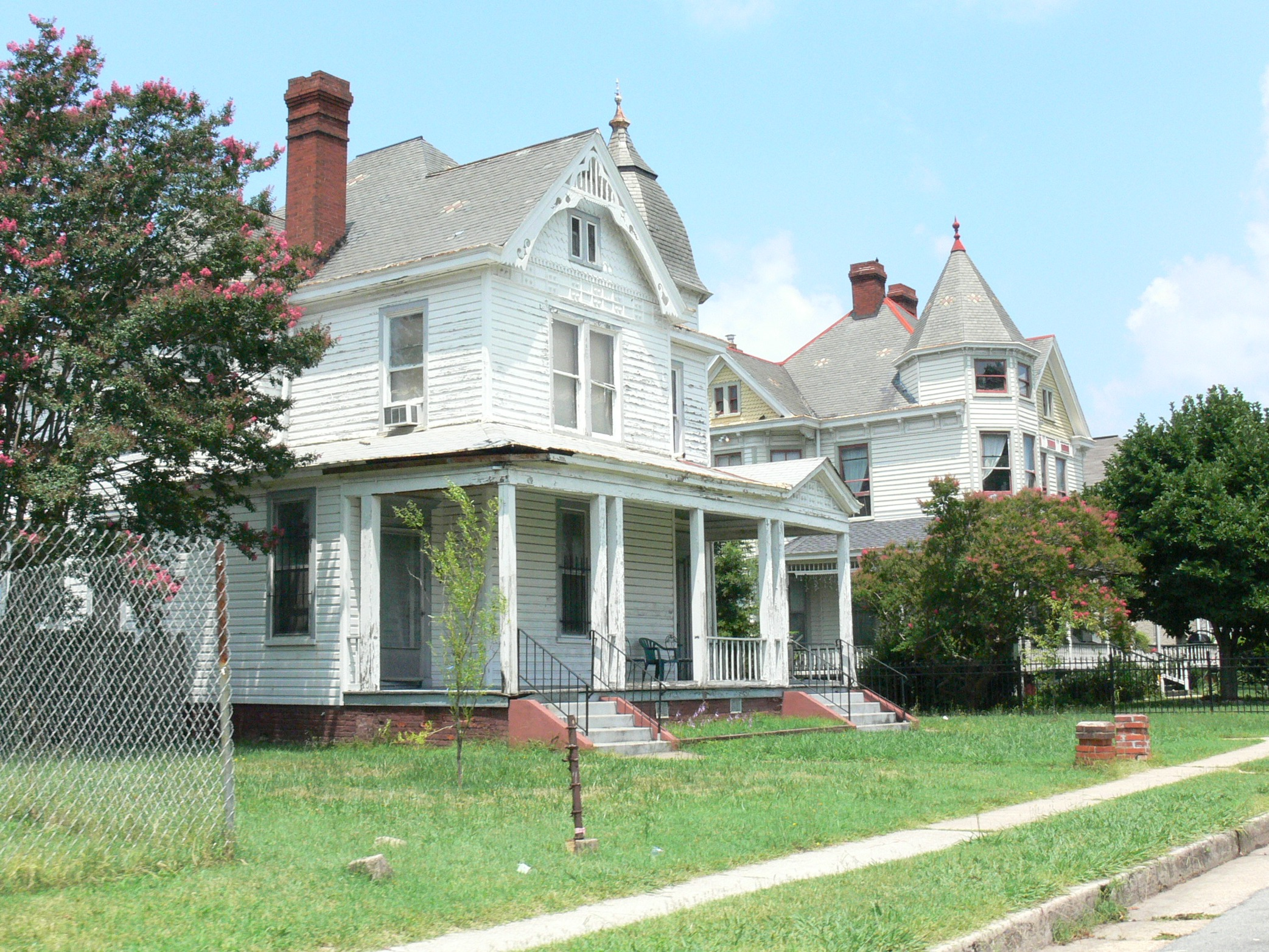

- Location within Virginia Location within the United States
- Location: Roughly Barton, Fendall, Greenwood, Lamb, Miller, Monterio, North, Rose, Dove, Home, Minor, Poe, Wellford, Wickham., Richmond, Virginia
- Coordinates: 37°33′37″N 77°25′57″W
- Area: 120 acres (49 ha)
- Architectural style: Late Victorian, Late 19th And 20th Century Revivals
- MPS: Streetcar Suburbs in Northside Richmond MPS
- NRHP reference No.: 02000592
- VLR No.: 127-0816

Significant dates
- Added to NRHP: August 06, 2003
- Designated VLR: June 13, 2001

Barton Heights is a streetcar suburb neighborhood and former town in the Northside area of Richmond, Virginia. The area was primarily developed between 1890 and the 1920s.

== History ==
Begun as an area of development in Henrico County, Virginia in 1890 by James H. Barton, Barton Heights rapidly developed as the result of being linked via streetcar in 1894 across the deep ravine of the Bacon's Quarter branch of Shockoe Creek, which flows into the Shockoe Valley. The area incorporated as a town in 1896, and was annexed by the city of Richmond in 1914.

The Town of Barton Heights Historic District encompasses 367 contributing buildings (305 main buildings and 62 outbuildings). They are primarily spacious wood-frame houses, most built in the first quarter of the 20th century, and sited on 50-foot-wide lots. The houses are largely built in the Queen Anne or Colonial Revival style.
