= North Side (Richmond, Virginia) =

Historical streetcar suburbs, mostly in the city

Coordinates: 37.574°N 77.445°W

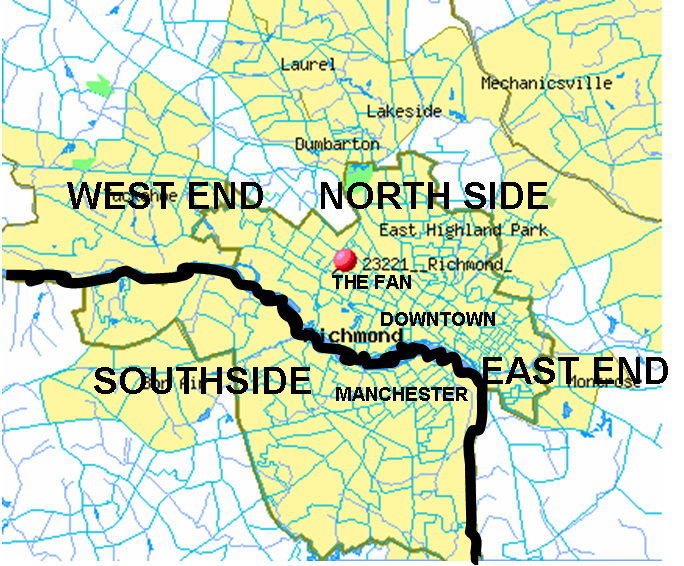
Richmond is often subdivided into Northside, Southside, East End and West End

The Northside is an area composed of northern Richmond, Virginia and some parts of Henrico County, Virginia.

The area is home to many diverse neighborhoods, especially early streetcar suburbs, including Barton Heights, Bellevue, Ginter Park, Washington Park, Hermitage Road, Highland Park, Sherwood Park, etc. These neighborhoods are made up of houses with a variety of architectural styles, which include Arts and Crafts Bungalows, Romanesque Revival, and Queen Anne houses among other styles.

== Geographic boundaries ==
Northside encompasses those areas of the city that are both north and east of Interstate 95 and north and west of Interstate 64 (which for a brief span merge through the urban heart of the city), as well as Bryan Park.

The term "Northside" also broadly includes much of central Henrico County as a portion of the Richmond Metropolitan area, being an extension of the development within the (now-fixed) city limits. Communities outside the city limits in this area include the census-designated places of Chamberlayne, Dumbarton, East Highland Park, Glen Allen, Lakeside, and Laurel.

== History and neighborhoods ==
Richmond's Northside is home to numerous neighborhoods listed as historic district including the Chestnut Hills-Plateau and Barton Heights neighborhoods.

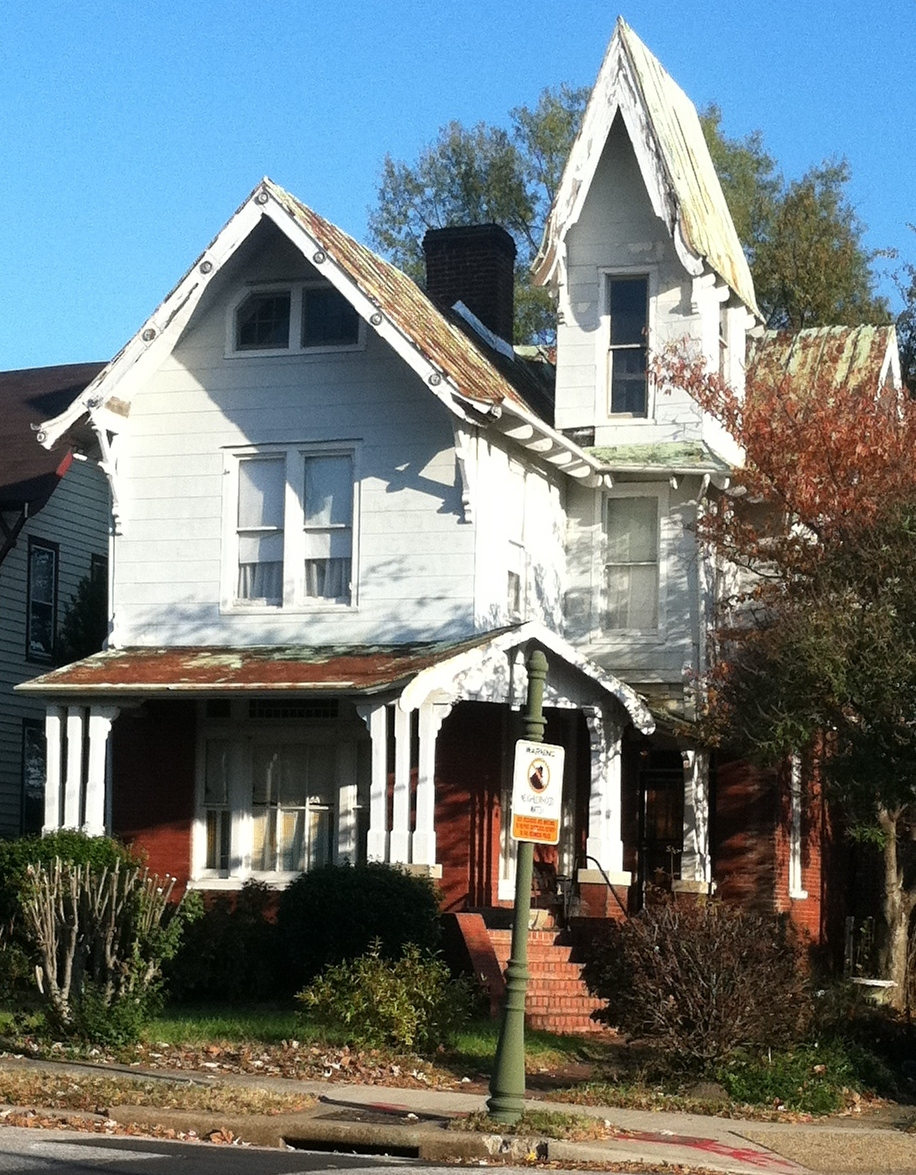
House in Chestnut Hill-Plateau historic district

== Landmarks ==
Some notable commercial and civic attractions on the Northside are Virginia Center Commons shopping mall, remnants of the Azalea Mall, Joseph Bryan Park, Richmond Raceway (formerly the Strawberry Hill Fairgrounds), and Lewis Ginter Botanical Garden.
