= Neighborhoods of Richmond, Virginia =

The Greater Richmond, Virginia area has many neighborhoods and districts. (Note: This article is an attempt to be inclusive of the broader definitions of the areas which are often considered part of the Greater Richmond Region, based on their urban or suburban character and nature (as identified by architectural historians, urban planners, or the like), rather than by strictly political boundaries.)

== Description of the Richmond Metro Region from a quadrant perspective ==
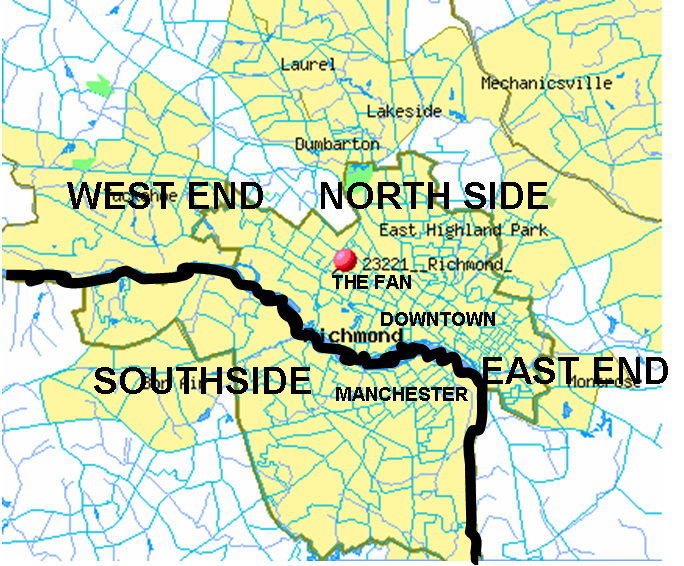
Richmond is often subdivided into North Side, Southside, East End and West End

The Greater Richmond area extends beyond the city limits into nearby counties. Descriptions of Richmond often describe the large area as falling into one of the four primarily geographic references which somewhat mirror the points of a compass: North Side, Southside, East End and West End. Since there is no one municipal organization that represents the Greater Richmond region, the boundaries of these subregions are loosely defined. The definitions are also affected by the James River which has separated Henrico County on the north bank and Chesterfield County to the south since the latter was formed in the 18th century. Until 1910, the James also separated the City of Richmond on the north bank from the City of Manchester on the south bank, until they merged by mutual agreement in 1910. A large portion of the river which divides the modern City of Richmond is part of the city's James River Park System.

Except where the James River continues to define a boundary between the West End and Southside, drawing a theoretical line between quadrants of the metropolitan area is not well defined as one moves away from the city. This is especially true north of the James with the distinctions between East, North, and West end areas, all of which are north of the river. In the broadest context, each of these may be considered by some to include portions of Hanover County, which at its closest point, is only 5 miles from the current city limits. However, the Chickahominy River separates the Hanover from Henrico County at this closest point, which is in the Mechanicsville area. Some outlying areas meeting may be considered as independent or outside the Richmond area, such as Mechanicsville, Midlothian, or Short Pump.

== Downtown ==
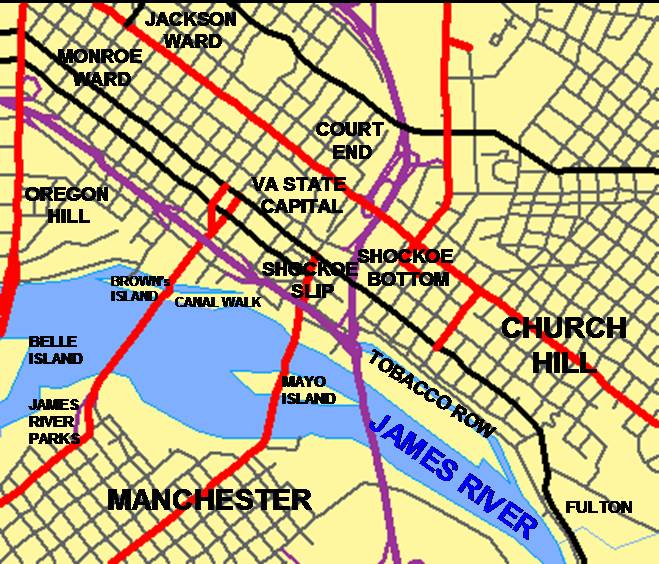
There are several areas in Downtown Richmond, each with their distinct history and character.

=== Court End ===
Court End is one of the oldest neighborhoods in Richmond, and is composed of the most important residential structures in the city. Court End is North of the Capitol District and west of I-95. Its name is derived from the Virginia Supreme Court's proximity to the Capitol Building. This convenient location made Court End a convenient home to many prominent citizens of Richmond, including Wickham, Valentine and Benjamin Watkings Leigh. Some say that this small area contains some of the city's most valuable and unusual architecture.

=== Jackson Ward ===
Jackson Ward is a historically black neighborhood that at one time was known as the "Harlem of the South. " A center for black commerce and entertainment, it was frequented by the likes of Duke Ellington, Ella Fitzgerald, Bill "Bojangles" Robinson, Lena Horne, Cab Calloway, Billie Holiday, Nat King Cole and James Brown. Jackson Ward was also home to Maggie L. Walker, the first woman to charter and serve as president of an American bank. The Maggie L. Walker House is now a U.S. National Historic Site. Located in Jackson Ward and listed on the National Register of Historic Places is the Shockoe Hill Burying Ground Historic District. This district includes the Shockoe Hill African Burying Ground, which is likely the largest burial ground for enslaved and free people of color in the United States. It is one of Virginia's most endangered historic places. Jackson Ward is also home to the Hippodrome Theater.

During the construction of the Eisenhower Interstate highway system in the 1950s Jackson Ward was split in two, much to the detriment of the neighborhood. In the early 2000s, the Greater Richmond Convention Center and Visitors Bureau was built at the eastern edge of Jackson Ward.

=== Monroe Ward ===
Monroe Ward is the neighborhood defined by the following streets. East of Belvidere, South of Broad, North of Franklin, and West of 14th Street. Monroe Ward lies just north of the Midtown Neighborhood.

=== Midtown ===
Midtown is south of Monroe Ward. The neighborhood defined by the following streets. Franklin Street south to W. Canal St. Belvidere east to 7th St.

=== The River District ===
In 1999, the City of Richmond completed its canal walk project, a refurbishment of a 1.25-mile segment of the Haxall Canal and the James River & Kanawha Canal that had fallen into disuse. Developed as a tourist destination, the area surrounding the Canal Walk was branded by The River District Alliance (RDA) (a 501(c)6 public/private organization) as "The River District.".

The actual boundaries of the River district are not defined, and include some businesses commonly thought to belong to other districts, like Shockoe Bottom and Shockoe Slip.

=== Shockoe Slip ===
Shockoe Slip is a collection of tobacco warehouses in which are located shops, restaurants, and offices. The name "slip" refers to the canal boat slips nearby where goods were loaded and unloaded. Shockoe Slip became developed as a commercial and entertainment district in the 1970s. The nightlife district came just after Richmond passed liquor-by-the-drink laws, and when the so-called fern bar became popular across the United States. The rough boundaries of Shockoe Slip include 14th Street, Main Street, Canal Street and 12th Street.

== East End ==
The East End of Richmond, Virginia is actually a collection of neighborhoods. Within the city, and in Henrico County, it roughly defined as including the area of Richmond north of the James River and east/northeast of the former Virginia Central Railroad - Chesapeake and Ohio Railway line (now owned by CSX Transportation and operated by the Buckingham Branch Railroad) which originated at Main Street Station, and south and west of I-295.

Within the city, the East End includes neighborhoods such as Church Hill, Fairmount, Union Hill, Fulton, Fulton Hill, Montrose Heights, Fairfield Court, Creighton Court, Whitcomb Court, Mosby Court, Eastview, Brauers, Peter Paul, Woodville, Church Hill North, Chimborazo and Oakwood.

The terminology "East End" also broadly includes much of eastern Henrico County and part of Hanover County as a portion the Richmond Metropolitan area.

=== Church Hill ===
The historic district of Church Hill encompasses the original land plot of the city of Richmond. There Patrick Henry gave his 1775 "Give me liberty or give me death!" speech in St. John's Church. Chimborazo Park occupies the former site of the largest American Civil War Hospital. Church Hill is notable as one of the largest extant 19th century neighborhoods in America, with many fine examples of period architecture. This area has undergone significant gentrification in recent years.

=== Shockoe Bottom ===
Shockoe Bottom, just east of downtown along the James River, became a major nightlife, dining, and entertainment center in the last two decades of the 20th century. After centuries of periodic flooding by the James River, development was greatly stimulated by the completion of Richmond's James River Flood Wall in 1995. Ironically, the next flooding disaster came not from the river, but from Hurricane Gaston which brought extensive local tributary flooding along the basin of Shockoe Creek and did extensive damage to this area in 2004, with businesses being shut down and many buildings condemned. The city of Richmond had serious discussions about moving the Richmond Braves baseball stadium from its current location at The Diamond to Shockoe Bottom or Tobacco Row, These plans fell through and in 2009 the Richmond Braves moved to Gwinnett, GA..

=== Tobacco Row ===
Just east of Shockoe Bottom, Tobacco Row is a collection of tobacco warehouses and cigarette factories adjacent to the James River and Kanawha Canal near its eastern terminus at the head of navigation of the James River. Beginning in the 18th century, many growers and shippers of Virginia's major cash-crop of tobacco maintained facilities there, as well as directly across the river at Manchester. Substantial multi-story brick buildings were constructed to protect the contents from loss due to fire.

During the American Civil War (1861–1865), Tobacco Row was the site of infamous Libby Prison and nearby Castle Thunder, detention facilities of the Confederate government.

The area was vacated by the tobacco companies by the late 1980s. Led by Richmond developer William H. Abeloff, many of the old warehouses of Tobacco Row were modernized and converted into developments of loft apartments, condominiums, offices, and retail space along part of the restored canal system. In 2006 the Richmond Housing Authority using HOPE VI grants worked with developer McCormack Baron Salazar to redevelop former warehouses in Tobacco Row into 250 mixed-income housing units.

=== Union Hill ===
Union Hill is one of the oldest and most historically significant neighborhoods of Richmond and, as such, has been the recent focus of rapid gentrification and preservation. Its architectural and historical significance has earned the neighborhood designation on the National Register of Historic Places and the Virginia Landmarks Register. It is situated on the high eastern bluff above Shockoe Bottom. Houses of a remarkable mix are balanced along the irregular, picturesque and sometimes narrow streets that follow the curve of the hill. Those homes that line Jefferson Park have a clear view of downtown Richmond. Union Hill is bordered on the south by Jefferson Avenue, on the north by Venable Street, on the east by 25th Street, and by Mosby on the west. The term “Union Hill” first occurs in 1817 — probably referring to the combination of several hills that were joined by fill and grading over the years.

Union Hill was featured in November 2007 on The Learning Channel's television program "Flip It Back." The episode highlighted the opportunities for historic preservation and investment in the neighborhood while focusing on the efforts by local entrepreneurs to restore and market a turn-of-the-century double house located at 816 and 818 North 23rd Street.

== Near West and West End ==
This section covers those neighborhoods that have at any point historically been considered part of the West End of Richmond.

=== Byrd Park ===
The Byrd Park neighborhood was in the Far West End of the City when it was planned in the late 1910s. This is a residential area, now in the Central neighborhoods of the city, bounded on the south by Byrd Park and Maymont Park, on the north by the Downtown Expressway, on the east by Meadow Street. The heart of the neighborhood is located north and east of its namesake and its three lakes; Boat, Swan and Shields. Homes include row houses built in the 1920s, two-story frame bungalows, brick Colonials, Cape Cods, tri-levels, ranchers and American Four Squares mostly built in the 1930s and 1940s. Westover Road hosts a number of large lakefront Spanish, Georgian and Colonial Revival mansions. The Fountain Lake area features upscale condos and apartments. A small, neighborhood retail section and a converted 1922 public school (now retirement home) is located along middle blocks Idlewood Avenue in the northern part of the neighborhood.

=== Carver ===
The Carver neighborhood, also called Sheep Hill, lies north of Broad Street (Richmond, Virginia) to the west of Jackson Ward and downtown Richmond. Carver was first settled by blue-collar Jewish and German tradesmen, and became a thriving black community in the early 1900s before being cut through by major thoroughfares such as Jefferson Davis Highway, Belvidere Street and Interstate 95. As the years passed, more and more houses became vacant, and the neighborhood declined. By the 1950s, Carver began to sharply decline and was seen as a "dangerous" neighborhood.

In modern times, Carver has seen new life, with redevelopment of older housing, some new homes, expansion to the north side of Broad Street of Virginia Commonwealth University facilities and student housing. Today, Carver is a diverse mix of students, singles, young families, and elderly residents.

=== Carytown/Museum District ===
Carytown is a residential and commercial area that generally consists of 1920s era homes and privately owned shops, clothing stores, cafes, and restaurants along Cary Street. The Byrd Theatre, located in this district, is a historic 1920s era movie palace that shows second run movies and that offers periodic performances of its Wurlitzer organ.

The Museum District (also sometimes known as West of the Boulevard, and often the Upper Fan) is located just west of the Fan district (and the Boulevard) and north of Carytown. Historically, this area was a site where many Confederate Soldiers were hospitalized/lived after the American Civil War. Some large institutions in this district are the Virginia Museum of Fine Arts, the world headquarters for the United Daughters of the Confederacy, and the Virginia Museum of History & Culture.

The architecture is predominantly from the 1920s, though other styles from Victorian through Art Deco, up to the modern period, are also represented. Most houses are attached, or semi-detached, with occasional apartment buildings, and large Mansions along Monument Avenue. Occasional houses are distinguished, but as in the neighboring Fan the most interesting aspect is the general preservation of the neighborhood—it has mostly been preserved as built.

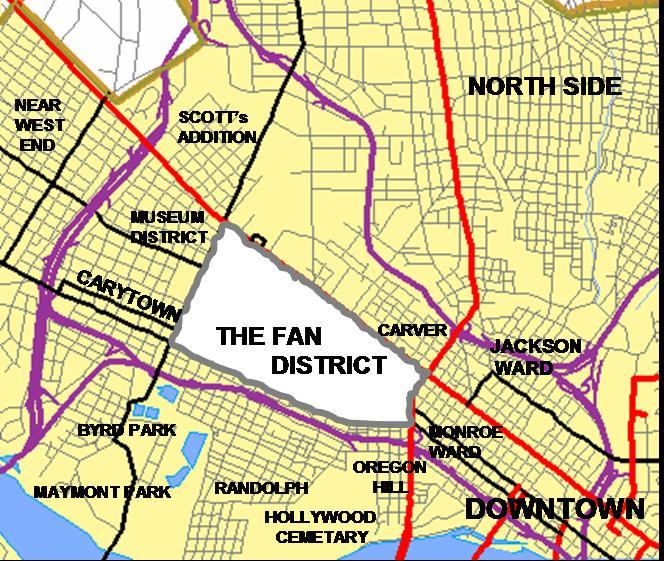
The Fan is one of many other Neighborhoods of Richmond Virginia

=== The Fan District ===
A residential neighborhood which is home to Virginia Commonwealth University, named for the fan-shaped grid of its streets. The Fan District is dominated by late-19th and early-20th century architecture. It lies immediately to the west of Downtown and east of Carytown/Museum district, between Broad Street and VA-195 (Downtown Expressway)

=== Newtowne West ===
Located west of Carver, Newtowne West is a residential neighborhood located north of Broad St. between Hermitage Rd. and Lombardy St., and south of Interstates 95 and 64. Newtowne West began as a working-class African-American neighborhood in the 1890s but gradually became a more self-sufficient community in the 1920s before falling into disrepair during the second half of the twentieth century. Selected in 1999 as a part of Richmond City's Neighborhoods in Bloom program, Newtowne West is currently a center of revitalization including the renovation of the historic Maggie L. Walker High School in 2001.

=== Randolph ===
This is a residential area bounded on the south by Colorado Avenue, on the north by the Downtown Expressway, on the east by several historic cemeteries and on the west by Meadow Street and Maymont Park. Randolph is notable for its access to the historic and scenic areas of Maymont Park, North Bank Park, and Hollywood Cemetery. The neighborhood is home to many blue-collar families.

=== Scott's Addition ===
A neighborhood and National Historic District located across Broad Street from the Museum District, it is a former industrial neighborhood which has been redeveloped into a commercial hub, with numerous modern restaurants and bars. Scott's Addition is bounded on the south by Broad Street, on the east by Boulevard, on the north by I-95/I-64 and on the west by I-195.

=== Uptown ===
Also known as the Lower Fan area. Neighborhood area popular with VCU students and containing much of the campus. (Campus is also contained in Midtown some, but the rest is mostly in Monroe Ward—where the name Monroe Campus comes from.) The area is defined by streets as follows: Meadow Street east to Belvidere. W. Canal St. north to Broad St.

== Northside ==
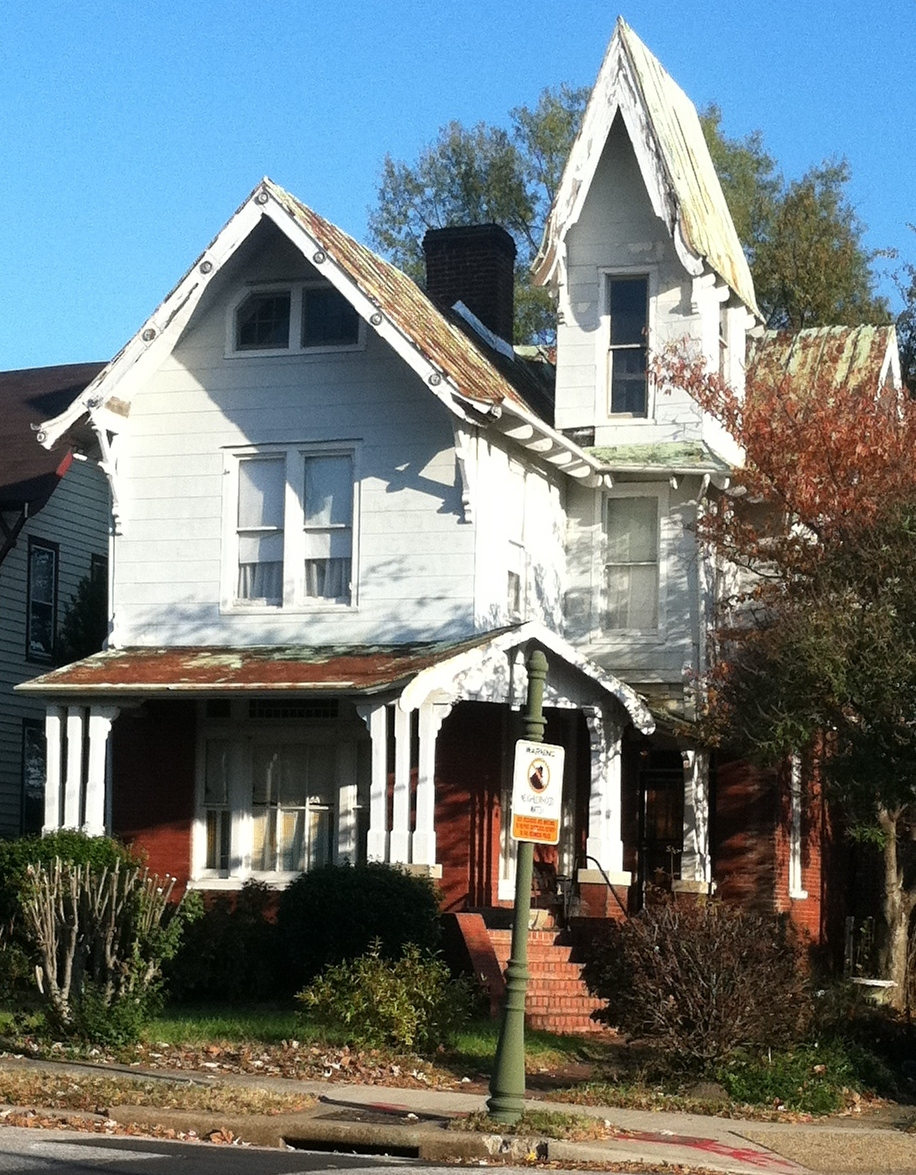
House in Chestnut Hill-Plateau historic district of North Side's Highland Park

Richmond's North Side is home to many diverse neighborhoods, including Barton Heights, Bellevue, Chestnut Hill-Plateau, Ginter Park, Rosedale, Washington Park, Hermitage Rd, Highland Park, Sherwood Park, etc. These neighborhoods are made up of houses with a variety of architectural styles, which include Arts and Crafts Bungalows, Victorian, Romanesque Revival, and Queen Anne houses among other styles. The city's North Side includes the campuses of Virginia Union University and Union Presbyterian Seminary, as well as regional attractions such as the Lewis Ginter Botanical Garden, Bryan Park, Richmond Raceway, and the Richmond Staples Mill Road Amtrak train station.

The terminology "North Side" also broadly includes much of central Henrico County to include Lakeside, Virginia.

== Southside ==
The Chippenham Parkway (State Route 150) and Virginia State Route 288 are the main beltways through Southside Richmond, while the Powhite Parkway and I-95 are the primary limited-access highway routes into Downtown Richmond from Southside.

=== Manchester ===
Manchester is an industrial and residential area directly south of downtown Richmond across the James River from the Canal Walk. Not to be confused with the Manchester area of Chesterfield County, Manchester (also known as Old Manchester and South Richmond) has a distinguished history of its own.

Originally known as Rocky Ridge, for over 200 years, Manchester was a separate town and later independent city on the south bank of the James River across from Richmond. It was commercially successful due to its agricultural mills and docks, where coal from the Midlothian area 13 miles west was transported on the Chesterfield Railroad, the first in Virginia, beginning in 1831. The City of Manchester merged with Richmond in 1910.

The former Southern Railway passenger station in Manchester now houses the Old Dominion Railway Historical Society's museum at 2nd and Hull Streets, near the south end of the Mayo Bridge.

=== Neighborhoods ===
• Hillside Court • Lafayette Gardens • Afton •

=== Forest Hill ===
The neighborhood of Forest Hill, one of Richmond's designated Historic Districts, is located along the southern banks of the James River, extending south to Reedy Creek and Bassett Avenue, east to Forest Hill Park, and west to Cedar Lane and Westover Hills Boulevard. One of the area's first trolley car suburbs, the neighborhood was built near the terminus of the trolley line which ran up Semmes Avenue and terminated at Forest Hill Park, where an amusement park and swimming lakes were located.

The neighborhood was home to Frederick William Sievers, sculptor of the Matthew Fontaine Maury and Stonewall Jackson monuments on Monument Avenue as well as the Virginia Monument at Gettysburg, Pennsylvania. There is a historical marker at the location of his workshop in the yard of a West 43rd Street home.

=== Westover Hills ===
Westover Hills, one of Richmond's more established neighborhoods, is located directly south of the James River where State Route 161, a major north–south roadway through the city, crosses via the Boulevard Bridge (also known as the "Nickel Bridge", its original toll) from the city's Fan District. The neighborhood lies along both the east and west sides of Westover Hills Boulevard in that area. This location makes it near the geographical center of the city. Most of the homes were built during the 1920-1940 period. The styles are highly varied, with Cape Cods located next to Spanish Colonial and Tudor Revival, with the odd farmhouse or Arts and Crafts thrown in.

Many housing sites feature large lots and a generally suburban feel. Some homes are located overlooking the banks of the James River, Westover Hills Boulevard, Forest Hill Ave. and Forest Hill Park. The neighborhood features well-established restaurants and businesses, along with churches and some arts establishments.

=== Stratford Hills and Southampton ===
Stratford Hills began life as a part of Chesterfield County, but was annexed by the City in the 1970s. Homes in the area are predominately 1950s-style ranchers and split-levels, with some larger, architecturally beautiful homes along stately Riverside Drive. The neighborhood is bound by Forest Hill Avenue to the south and the James River to the north, with Huguenot Rd. and Powhite Parkway roughly forming the west and east boundaries. The Pony Pasture and James River Park System are accessible from Cherokee Road in this neighborhood.

=== Bon Air ===
Bon Air is located just outside the city borders at the intersection of the Powhite Parkway (VA-76) and the Chippenham Parkway (VA-150)

Bon Air is located in Chesterfield County just outside the city borders. Originally developed in 1877 as a seasonal resort along the Richmond and Danville train line, it evolved into a year-round village and is now an inner suburb of Richmond. The north–south oriented Buford Road connects various subdivisions between Huguenot Road to the North and Midlothian Turnpike to the South. The Powhite Creek runs through the area. The central portion of the Bon Air Village has been designated as a National Historic District with many structures of Victorian design from the late 19th and early 20th centuries. The more recent (1950s-1960s) developments along Huguenot Road include the Bon Air Shopping Center as well as residential subdivisions like Woodmont, Brookwood Estates, and Oxford. Between Forest Hill Ave and Jahnke Roads is Grand Summit, Crestwood Farms, and the mid-century modern Highland Hills subdivisions. Other Bon Air subdivisions to the south of Jahnke include Brighton Green and Brown Road neighborhoods.

While remnants of the 1916 village-era post office, 1902 Hazen Library, and Hotel Grounds (currently the Bon Air Community Association) still remain at the intersection of Rockaway and McRae Roads, current day "Old Town" Bon Air is generally not a tourism attraction. Bon Air is largely a bedroom community, surrounded by suburban shopping centers. In some cases, these shopping centers house independent businesses (butchers, coffee shops, restaurants) that are spinoffs from downtown Richmond's thriving independent business and restaurant scene. Bon Air is 10 minutes by car from the city or the West End via the Powhite Parkway or Chippenham Parkway.

=== Other Southside neighborhoods ===
Places such as Midlothian, Brandermill, Chester, Virginia and the Jefferson Davis Corridor are more closely associated with Chesterfield County, Virginia but are sometimes included in the definition of Southside. The parts of Richmond that are within the city borders are sometimes referred to collectively as South Richmond.
