= Union Hill, Richmond, Virginia =

- Union Hill Historic District
- U.S. National Register of Historic Places
- U.S. Historic district
- Virginia Landmarks Register
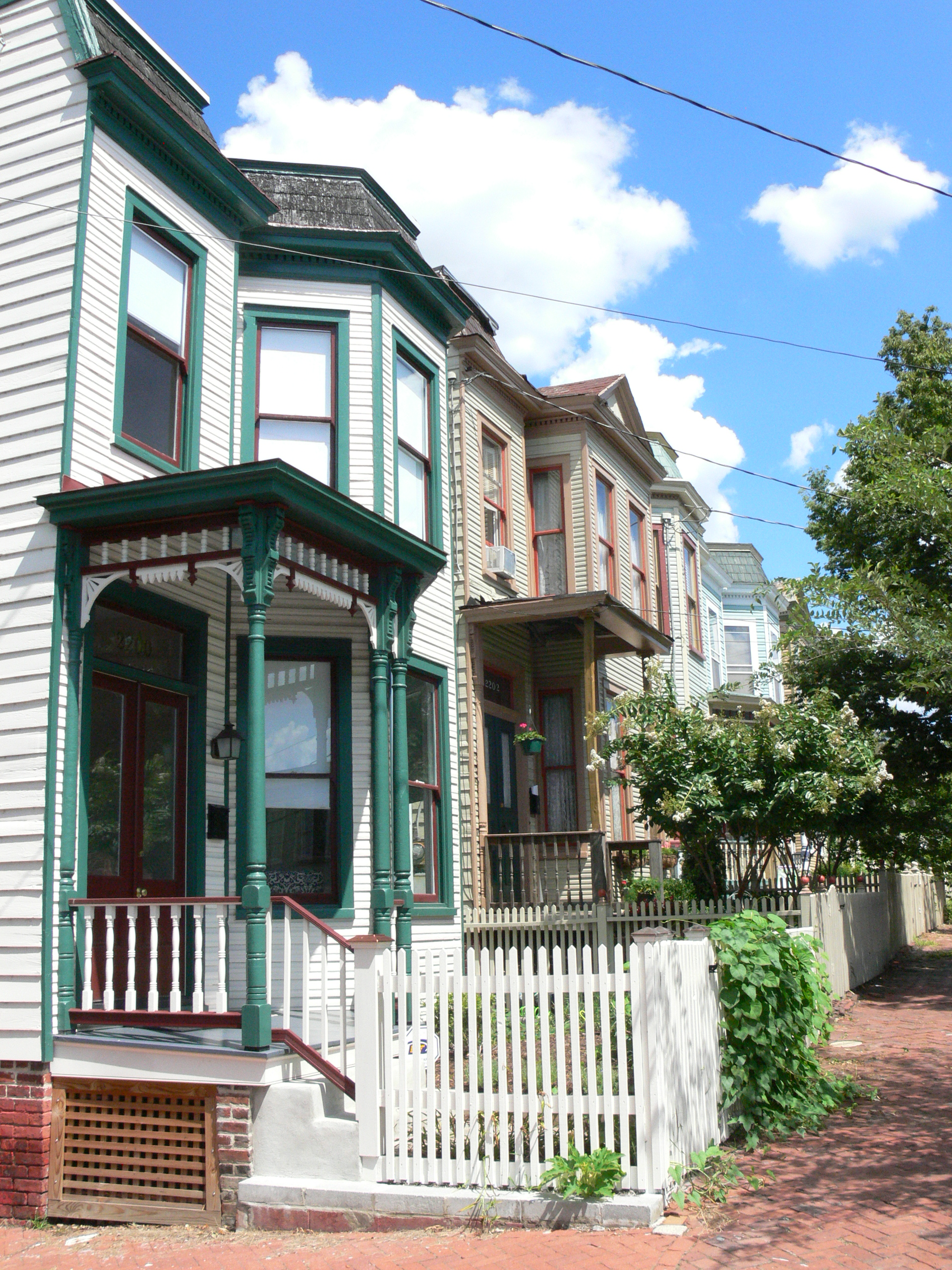

- Location within Virginia
- Location: Roughly 20th, 21st, 22nd, 23rd, 24th 25th, Jessamine, Pink, Burton, Carrington, Cedar, Clay, Jefferson, Leigh, M, O, Sts; Richmond, Virginia
- Coordinates: 37°32′14″N 77°25′5″W
- Architect: Anderson, D. Wiley; et al.
- Architectural style: Federal, Greek Revival
- NRHP reference No.: 02001670
- VLR No.: 127-0815

Significant dates
- Added to NRHP: December 31, 2002
- Designated VLR: December 5, 2001, April 30, 2008

Union Hill is a historic district of Richmond, Virginia. According to the Richmond Times Dispatch, the neighborhood "generally is bordered on the south by East Marshall Street and Jefferson Avenue, on the west by Mosby Street, on the north by O and Carrington streets, and angled on the east by North 25th Street." The neighborhood is on the Virginia Landmarks Register and the National Register of Historic Places, and is also one of sixteen designated "Old and Historic Districts" in Richmond.

== History ==
Street grading in the late 19th and early 20th centuries joined two hills, giving the neighborhood its name.

The neighborhood is largely working class and has historically been mixed race. A series of white flight and then black flight led to a high proportion of neglected or abandoned properties in the area by the 1990s. City government responded with crime-reduction and blight-removal projects; efforts to demolish abandoned properties in the district were opposed by the Alliance to Conserve Old Richmond Neighborhoods, a historic preservationist group. Redevelopment intensified in the 2010s.

The Union Hill Historic District was added to the Virginia Landmarks Register in December 2001 and to the National Register of Historic Places in December 2002.

== Geography and architecture ==
Union Hill lies to the north of Church Hill.

The architecture of the neighborhood varies, with buildings in the Federal, Greek Revival, Italianate, Queen Anne, and Art Deco styles.
