= Ginter House =

Historic house in Virginia, United States

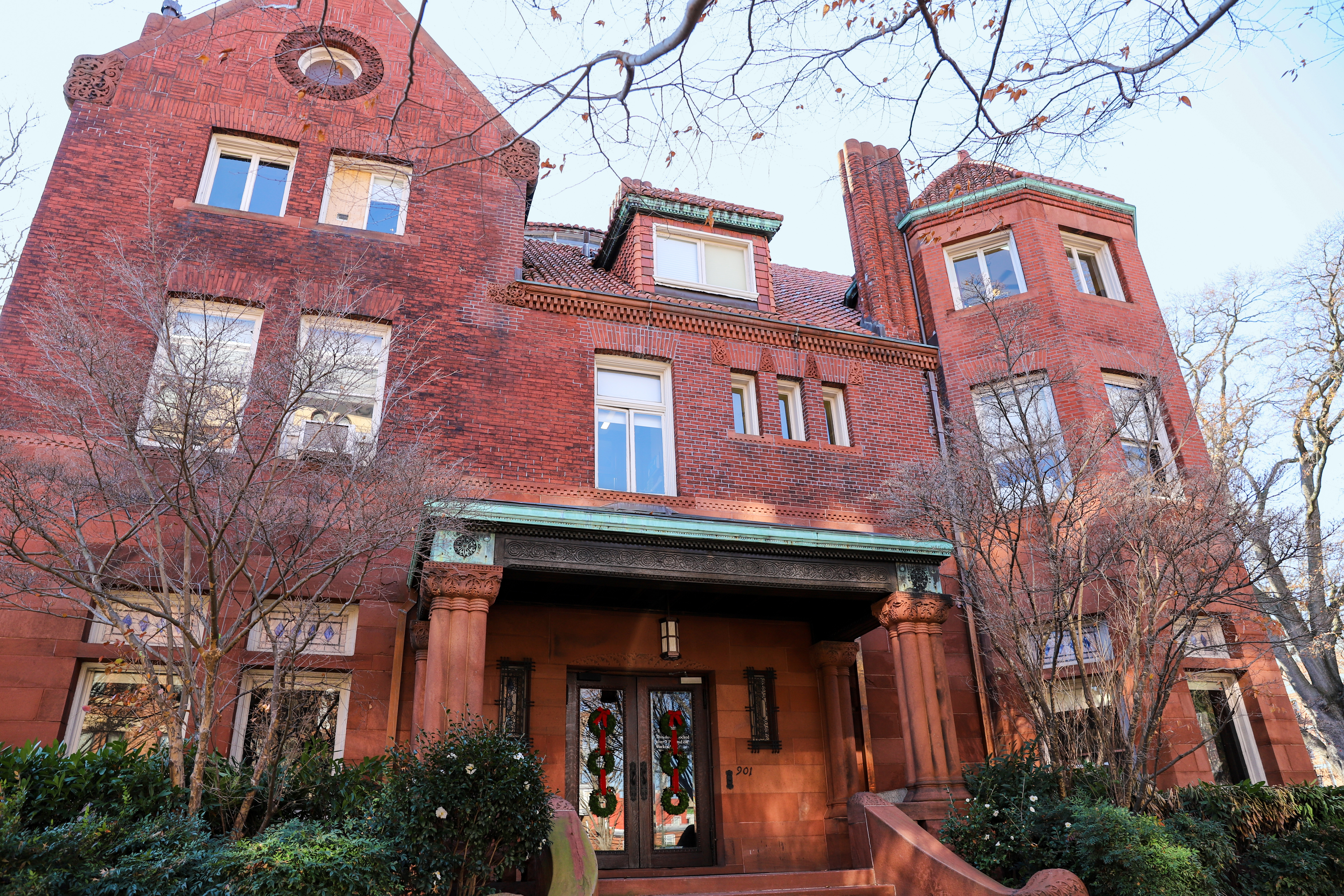
- Ginter House, Richmond VA

- Location within Virginia Location within the United States

General information
- Location: Richmond, Virginia, United States
- Coordinates: 37°32′28″N 77°26′5″W
- Current tenants: Virginia Commonwealth University
- Completed: 1892
- Owner: Virginia Commonwealth University

Design and construction
- Architects: Harvey L. Page, William Winthrop Kent

Website
- rvahub.com/2018/06/08/must-see-rva-ginter-house

Ginter House is the historic former residence of Lewis Ginter in Richmond, Virginia. Built in 1892, it is owned by Virginia Commonwealth University (VCU) and is home to the provost's office. It was used as Richmond's first public library from 1925 until 1930, was used as part of a school, and was the main administrative building on the Monroe Park, Virginia campus of VCU for more than 40 years. In September 2020, the University’s Board of Visitors voted to de-commemorate several buildings on campus named for members of the Confederacy including the Lewis Ginter house. The house is now simply known as the "Office of the Provost".

== History ==
The home was built from 1888 to 1892 for Ginter, a cigarette magnate and philanthropist who developed an area of Richmond's north side and built the Jefferson Hotel. Harvey L. Page and William Winthrop Kent were brought in from Washington, D.C. to design the home. It is three and one half stories high and includes a polygonal three-story tower. It uses brownstone at its base, pecked brownstone on the first floor, patterned brick, and stone panels. The roof employed Spanish tile.

The home has a mahogany library and ironwork done by G. Krug and Sons. Ginter never married and lived in the home with John Pope, his younger business associate and long-time friend, and Ginter's niece Grace Arents. When Ginter died on October 2, 1897, the home and his fortune were left to Arents (1848-1926).

== Richmond Public Library and Richmond School of Social Work and Public Health ==
In 1924, Ginter House became the first site for the newly founded Richmond Public Library. The home's library was used by students of the Richmond School of Social Work and Public Health which was established across the street in 1925 (now Founder's Hall). When the new Richmond library (aka Dooley Library) was opened in 1930, its books were moved to the new location and the Richmond School of Social Work and Public Health purchased Ginter House and property in 1930. It was used for its library, as classroom space and offices. It later became used only for administrative functions. The school became Richmond Professional Institute (RPI). It merged in 1968 with the Medical College of Virginia to become Virginia Commonwealth University.

An east wing was added as part of a WPA project in 1939 and a west wing was added on to the back in 1949.

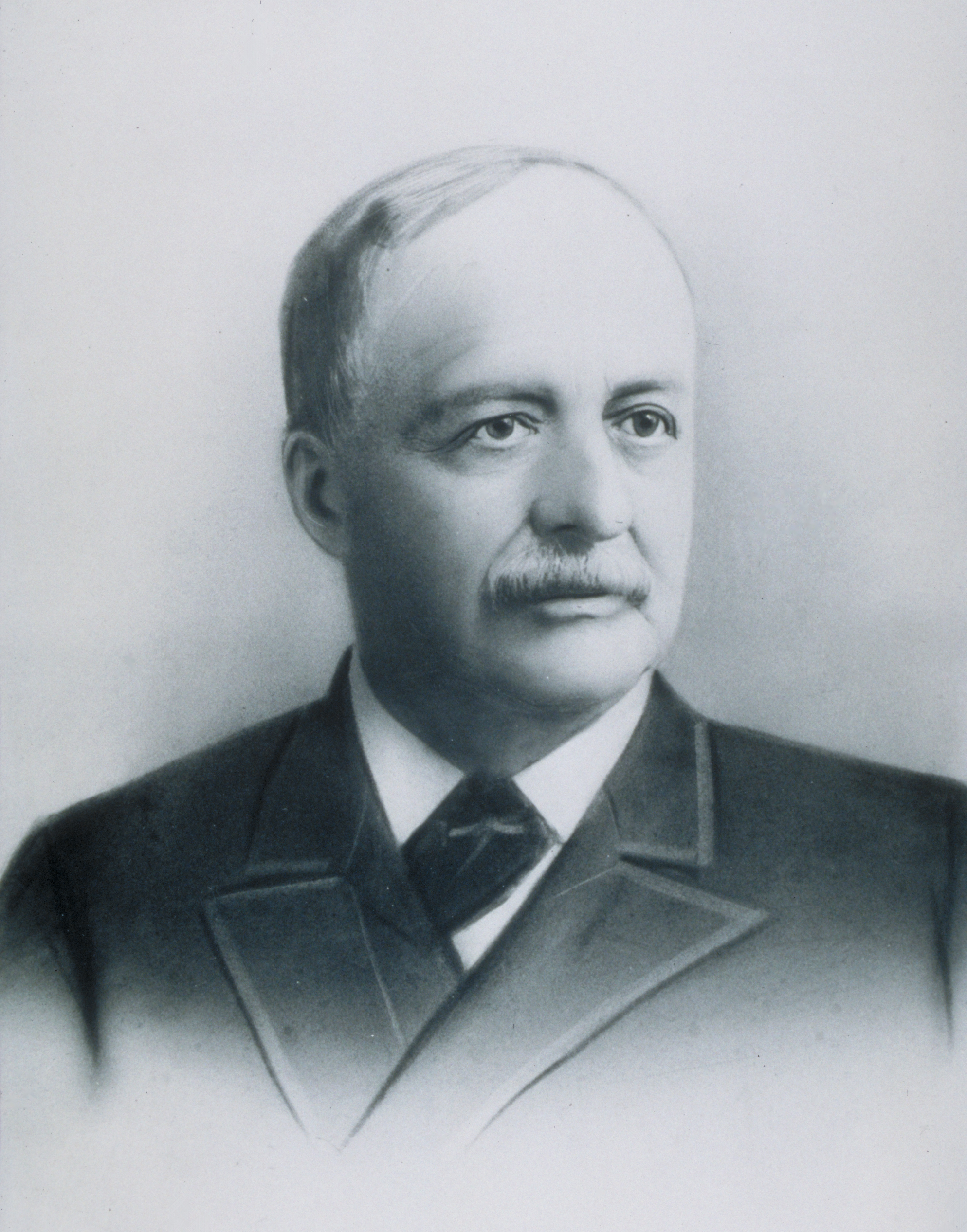
Lewis Ginter

An example of Richardsonian architecture, it is located on the corner of Shafer Street and West Franklin Street at 901 West Franklin Street. The home features decorative woodwork, ornate fireplaces, stained glass windows, leather wallpaper and wrought iron detailing.

== Summer residence ==
In the late 19th century, Ginter built a large luxurious, Victorian-style mansion in Richmond's North Side for his summer home where he lived with John Pope. Westbrook had a tower, the top floor of which was used by the major as a private barbershop. The home was filled with dark wood paneling in oak, birch, mahogany and cherry. Fireplaces were constructed with imported tile in various designs and colors. It became a psychiatric hospital in 1911. The house was demolished in 1975.

== See also ==
- Lewis Ginter Botanical Garden
- Bloemendaal (residence)
