= Neathawk Dubuque & Packett =

American advertising agency

- Industry: Advertising
- Predecessor: Brand Edmonds Packett; Neathawk Dubuque; The Packett Group
- Founded: 1963; 62 years ago
- Founder: Howard Packett
- Headquarters: United States
- Number of employees: 50+ (2009)

Neathawk Dubuque & Packett is an American full-service advertising, marketing and public relations agency with offices in Richmond, VA, Chattanooga, TN, Charlotte and Durham, NC, and Tampa, FL, with an array of clients including VCU Medical Center, Bliley's, Jefferson Hotel, Virginia Tech, Loma Linda University Medical Center, Kindred Healthcare, Volkswagen Group of America, Massachusetts General Hospital and Meggitt Training Systems.

ND&P was named one of Richmond, VA's top ten advertising firms by Richmond.com.

== History ==
In 1963, Howard Packett founded Brand Edmonds Packett, which was later changed to The Packett Group. Roger Neathawk, Susan Dubuque, and Chuck Miller founded Market Strategies Inc. in 1984, changing the name to Neathawk Dubuque in 2000. In 2004, the Richmond, VA based Neathawk Dubuque merged with the Roanoke-based Packett Group to form Neathawk Dubuque & Packett. In 2007, Neathawk Dubuque & Packett acquired Chattanooga, Tennessee based ddN. In 2009, ND&P expanded to Tampa, Florida and Durham, North Carolina, boasting more than 50 employees in five states. On February 1, 2010, they acquired new media gurus, 3HD.
