= Richmond Public Library (United States) =

Public library system in Richmond, Virginia, United States

- Established: 1924
- Branches: 9

Collection
- Items collected: books, e-books, music, cds, periodicals, maps, genealogical archives, business directories, local history, movies, TV shows

Access and use
- Population served: 200,000 population

Other information
- Website: http://www.richmondpubliclibrary.org/

Richmond Public Library is a public library in Richmond, Virginia.

== History ==
While many other libraries in the United States were provided initial funding by Andrew Carnegie, the City of Richmond famously rejected Carnegie funding twice. After the City of Richmond's finance committee rejected the first Carnegie offer in 1901, Carnegie offered to donate $100,000 to the city of Richmond, Virginia, for a public library. The city council had to furnish a site for the building and guarantee that $10,000 in municipal funds would be budgeted for the library each year. Despite the support from the majority of Richmond's civic leaders, the city council rejected Carnegie's offer. A combination of aversion to new taxes, fear of modernization, and fear that Carnegie might require the city to admit black patrons to his library account for the local government's refusal. A Richmond Public Library did open in 1924 with alternative sources of funding. Richmond formed a Richmond Public Library Association in 1905. The Association did not gather sufficient funds to open a library until 1922, when John Stewart Bryan became president of the Association. The next year, in 1923, Bryan became chairman of the Richmond Public Library Board, and in 1924, the Board chose the former home of Lewis Ginter as the site of the first Library. The first branch opened in 1925 as the Phyllis Wheatley Branch of the YWCA to serve African-Americans. In 1925, Sallie May Dooley died and left $500,000 to the City to construct a public library in memory of her husband, Major James H. Dooley. The Dooley Library (at the same location as the current Main library) opened in 1930 and the contents of the original library were moved in.

In 1947, RPL Board opened all branches of the library system to black people.

Richmond Public Library Black History Month 2025

Richmond Public library has monthly and annual events that focus on various themes. The 2025 Black History Month Theme focused on Afro-Americans and their labor plight. It brings to light how slave labor, voluntary, unskilled, skilled among other experiences within the community are linked with this group as a whole. They were a multitude of events. One called "Read Up Richmond: The History of Black Nurses in Virginia" discusses the experiences of Afro-American nurses in current times as well as their experiences in the past. There was also the "Annual Black History Month Social" and the "10th Annual Black History Month Virginia Author Celebration." This included a book fair, author tables, speakers and presentations. Another event was the "Weekend Film Fest: A Spike Lee Joint." This was hosted on February 15 and 16. This movie event was hosted at the West End Branch and featured various movies with affluent director/producer Spike Lee, as well as various Afro-American actors.

== Locations ==
Name	Address	Image
Belmont	3100 Ellwood Avenue, Richmond, VA 23221	
Broad Rock	4820 Old Warwick Road, Richmond, VA 23224	
East End	1200 North 25th Street, Richmond, VA 23223	
Ginter Park	1200 Westbrook Avenue, Richmond, VA 23227	
Hull Street	1400 Hull Street, Richmond, VA 23224	
Main Library	101 East Franklin Street, Richmond, VA 23219	
North Avenue	2901 North Avenue, Richmond, VA 23222	
West End	5420 Patterson Avenue, Richmond, VA 23226	
Westover Hills	1408 Westover Hills Boulevard, Richmond, VA 23225	
