= Deep Run Hunt Club Rosedale Lodge =

United States historic place

- U.S. National Register of Historic Places
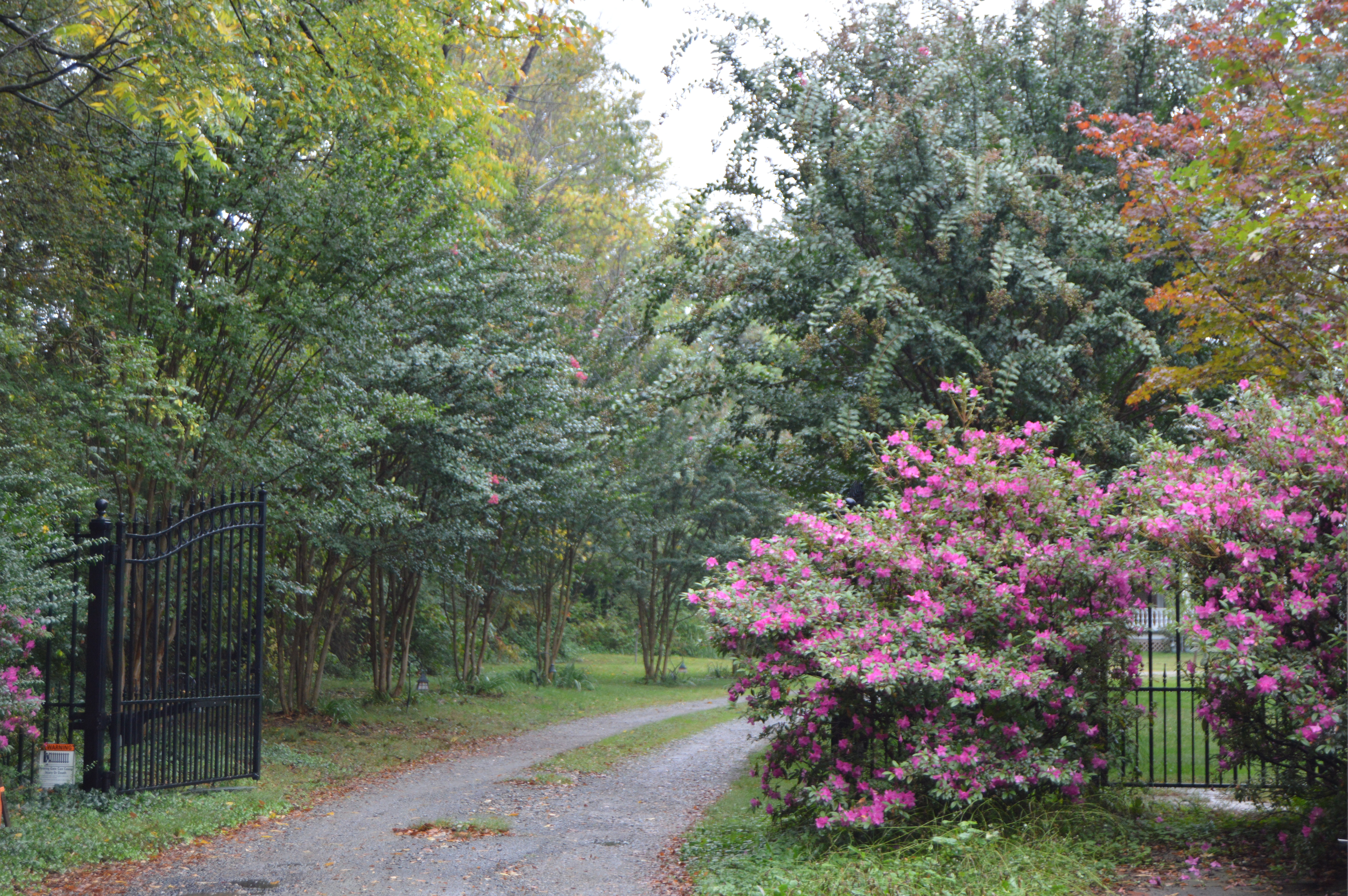
- Driveway to the Deep Run Hunt Club Rosedale Lodge in Richmond, Virginia, United States.

- Location within Virginia Location within the United States
- Location: 1900 Avondale Avenue, Richmond, Virginia
- Coordinates: 37°39′45.973″N 77°43′17.49″W
- Built: 1896
- Architect: D. Wiley Anderson
- NRHP reference No.: 100003977

Deep Run Hunt Club Rosedale Lodge is a historic building in Richmond, Virginia, United States.

== History ==
In 1895, Lewis Ginter hired architect D. Wiley Anderson to remodel Rosedale Lodge and enlarge what was originally a four-room brick farmhouse from the early 1800s. The construction was completed in the year 1896.

On April 17, 2010, the property was added to Virginia Landmarks Registry and on May 21, 2019, the property got listed on the National Register of Historic Places.
