= Holly Shimizu =

American horticulturalist and writer

Holly H. Shimizu is an American horticulturalist and writer. She is best known for her television appearances on The Victory Garden on PBS, and as the former executive director of the United States Botanic Garden.

== Education and career ==
Shimizu graduated from high school in Philadelphia, and then received an Associate of Science degree from Temple University in 1974. She received a Bachelor of Science in horticulture from Penn State University in 1976. Following graduation she spent four years in Europe, working in public gardens. On moving back to the United States, she became the first curator of the National Herb Garden at the National Arboretum in Washington, D.C. She received a Master of Science degree in horticulture from the University of Maryland. From 1988 to 1996 Shimizu was assistant executive director and chief horticulturalist at the U.S. Botanic Garden. From 1996 to 2000 she was managing director of the Lewis Ginter Botanical Garden in Richmond, Virginia

Shimizu was executive director of the U.S. Botanical Garden from 2000, retiring in 2014.

During her time at Ginter and the U.S. Botanical Garden she appeared on The Victory Garden over a 12-year period. She continues to appear on National Public Radio.

She lives in Glen Echo, Maryland and Lewes, Delaware with her husband Osamu Shimizu.

== Awards ==
- Scott Medal and Award, Scott Arboretum of Swarthmore College
- Thomas Roland Medal, Massachusetts Horticultural Society
- Outstanding Public Garden Director, American Horticultural Society
