= Franklin Street (Richmond) =

Named after Benjamin Franklin, Franklin Street runs East and West through the city of Richmond, Virginia. The street is home to several historic landmarks, including the Richmond home of Robert E. Lee, Masons’ Hall and the Jefferson Hotel. The Jefferson Hotel opened in 1895, is one of 27 hotels in the United States to have both Mobil Five Star and AAA Five Diamond ratings, and has hosted numerous presidents, writers, and celebrities. Franklin Street also runs through the middle of the Monroe Park Campus of Virginia Commonwealth University.

West Franklin Street (and its extension, Monument Avenue) has been one of Richmond's most stylish residential addresses since the late 19th century. In the late 19th century Monument Avenue was laid out as an extension of the 1200 block of West Franklin Street. This block has housed a mix of different building types and functions, including two churches, a hospital, the largest apartment building in the historic district, and single-family homes of various architectural styles.

At the West end of the 1200 block of Franklin Street stood the Stuart Monument (removed in 2020), depicting Confederate Major General J. E. B. Stuart. The Stuart Monument also marks the start of Monument Avenue, a stretch of road formerly memorializing Confederate participants in the Civil War and Arthur Ashe, an international tennis star and Richmond native. The "Monument Avenue Historic District" is listed on the National Register of Historic Places.

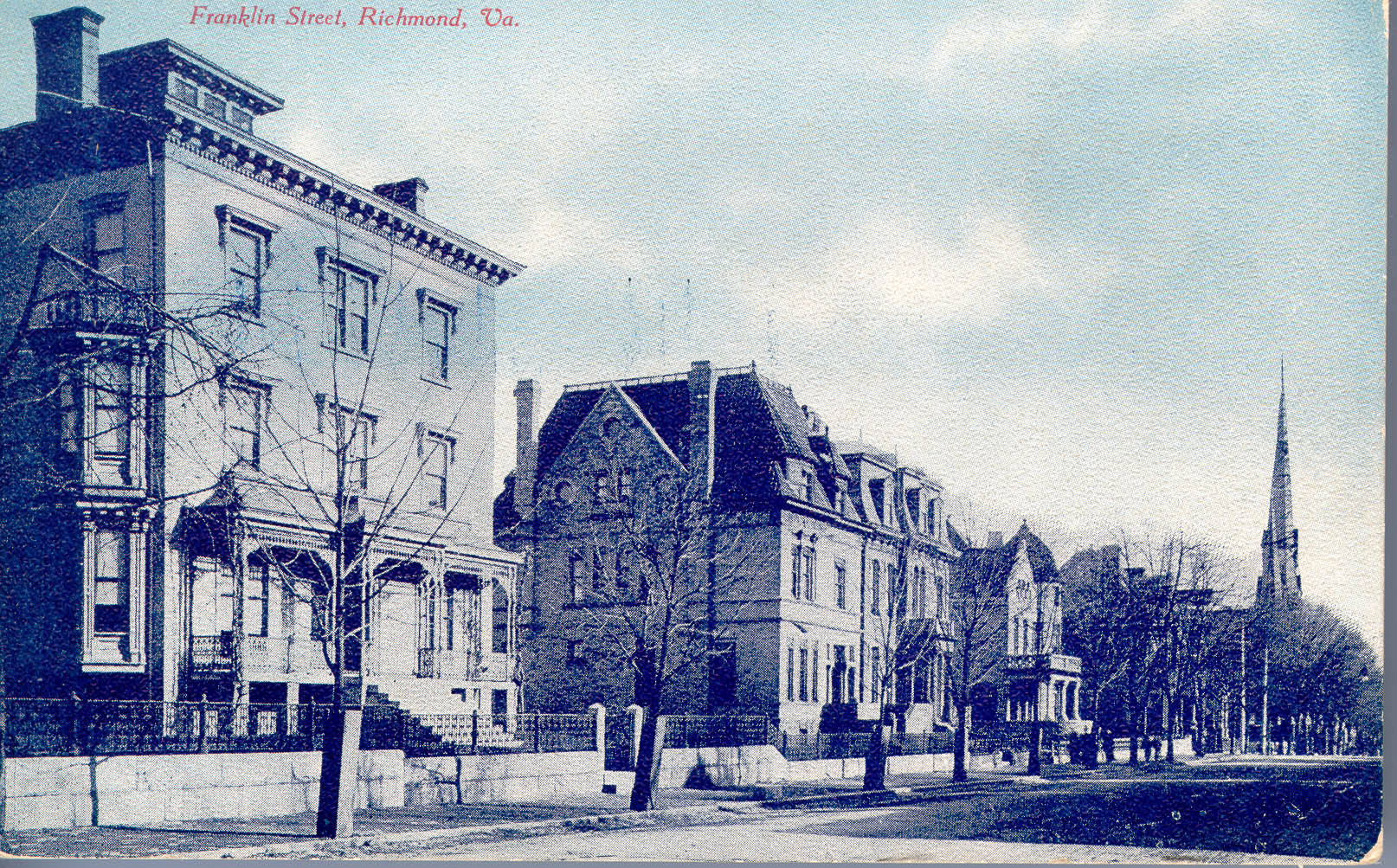
Postcard of Franklin Street, c.1900

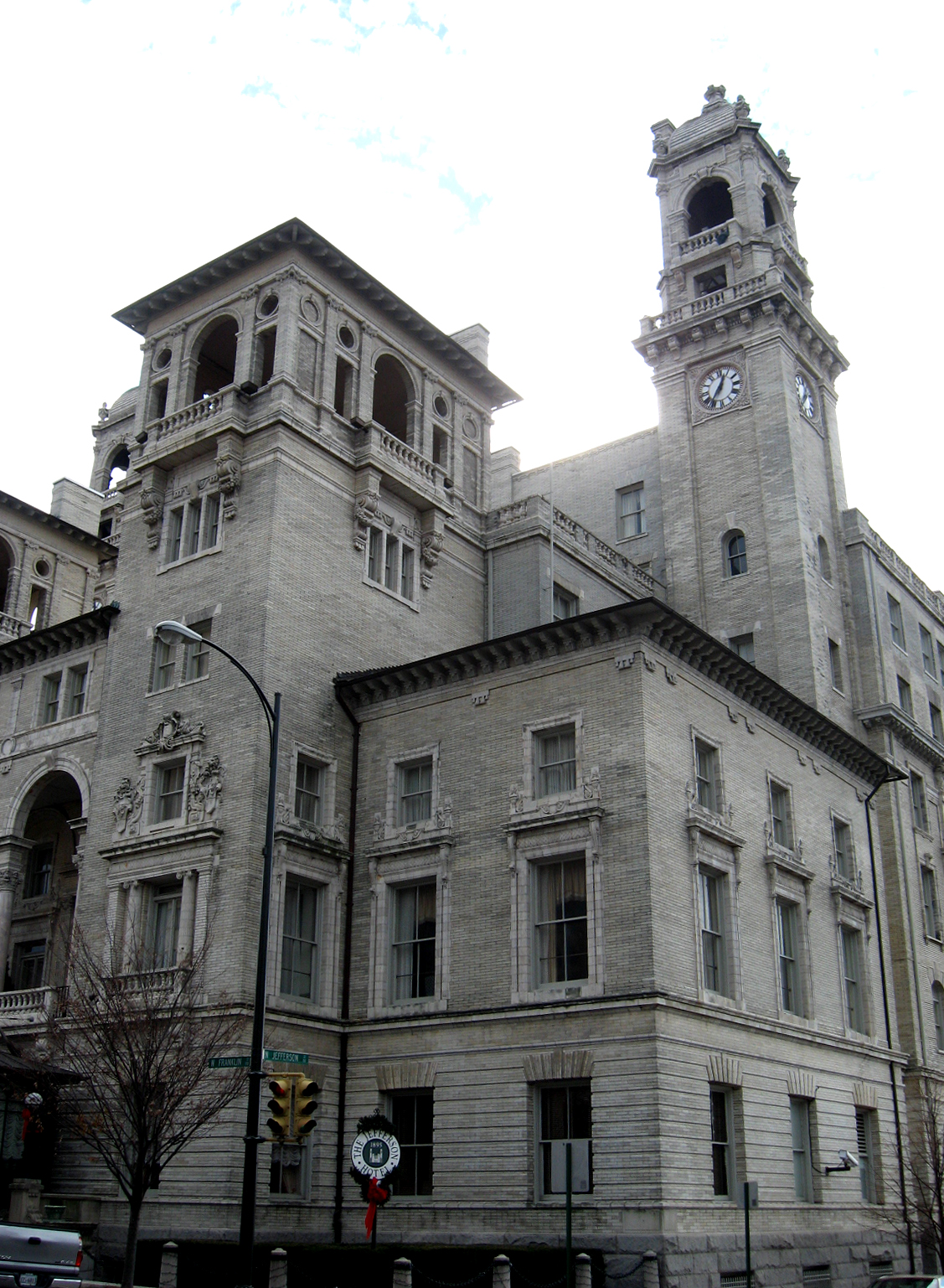
The Jefferson Hotel, 101 West Franklin Street, Richmond, Virginia
