= St. Andrews School (Virginia) =

Coordinates: 37.5422°N 77.4526°W

St. Andrew's School (Virginia)

Location
- 227 South Cherry Street; Richmond, Virginia; United States

Information
- Type: Tuition-free Independent school (Non-profit Organization)
- Motto: St. Andrew's is a tuition-free school focused on the whole child.
- Established: 1894
- Head of school: Hannah Barr
- Grades: K–5
- Enrollment: 96
- Colors: Red, White, Black
- Mascot: Otter
- Affiliation: Episcopalian
- Website: Official website

St. Andrew's School is a tuition-free school focused on the whole child. It is fully accredited by the Virginia Association of Independent Schools (VAIS). Richmond philanthropist and social reformer Grace Arents founded the school in 1894. It is located in the historic Oregon Hill neighborhood. The school includes grades K-5 with a total of 96 students.

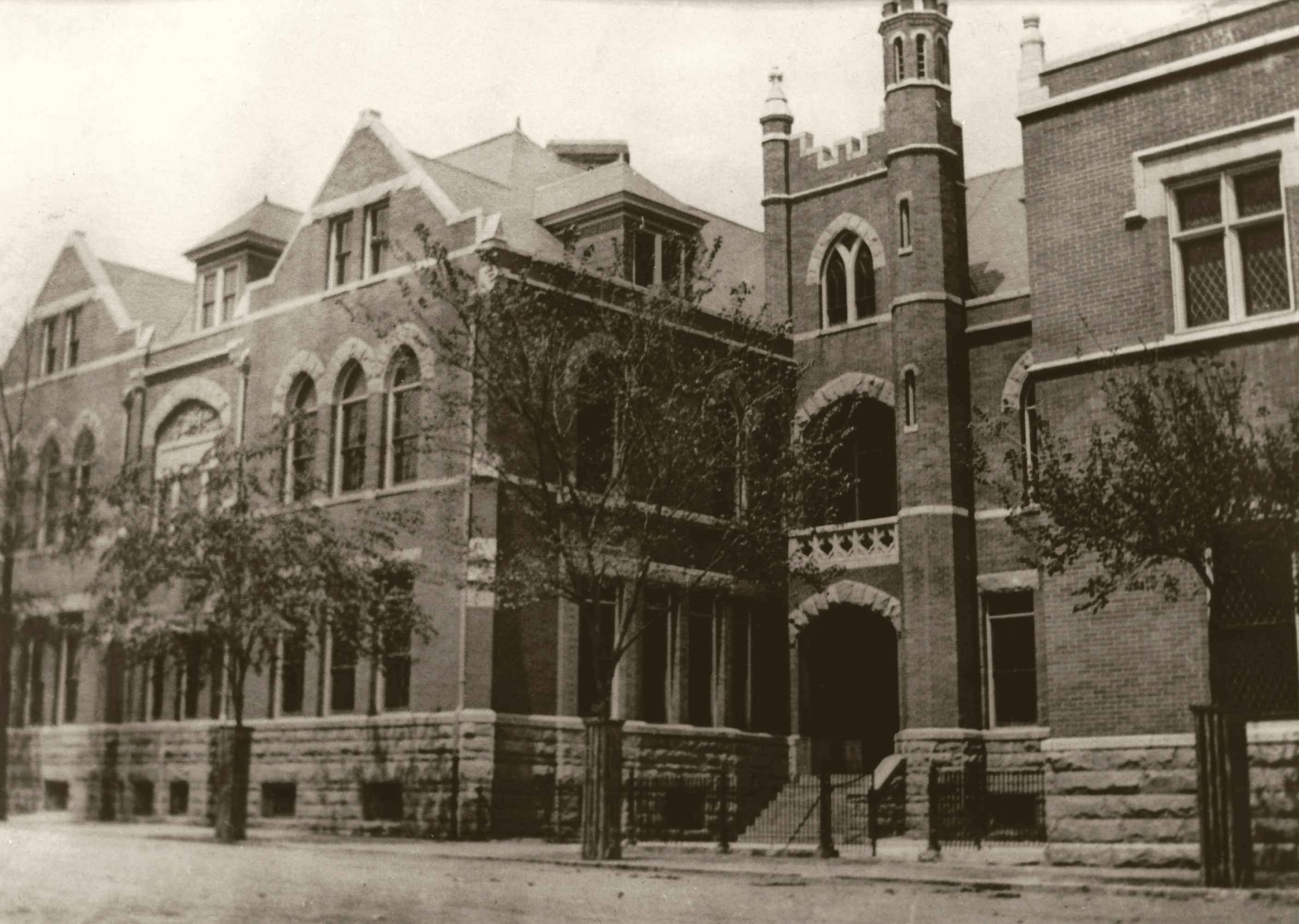
St. Andrew's School soon after it was built during the early 1900s

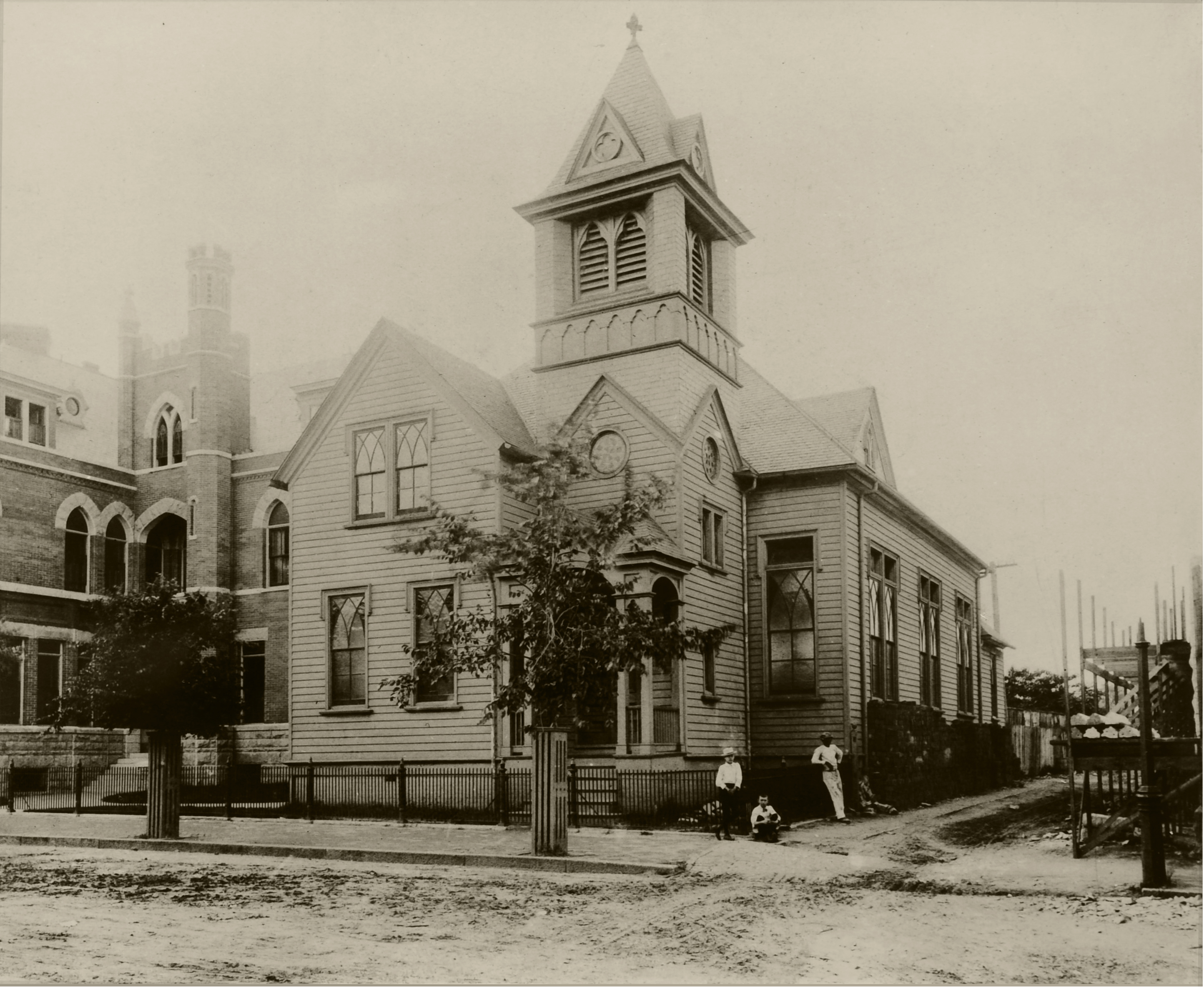
The St. Andrew's Concert Hall and St. Andrew's School

== History ==
=== Grace Arents ===
Grace Arents was born in New York City but spent most of her life establishing philanthropic institutions in Richmond, VA. Arents came under the care of her uncle and wealthy tobacco investor, Major Lewis Ginter, after her father's death. Arents eventually inherited her uncle's fortune and used the money to create and support in perpetuity a number of social institutions. She focused many of her efforts in the working-class neighborhood of Oregon Hill. The construction of St. Andrew's Houses in 1904, "which constitute one of the earliest examples of subsidized housing in Virginia," demonstrate her forward thinking approach.

In addition to creating St. Andrew's School, Arents funded and supervised the construction of the buildings in the St. Andrew's Church Complex, which are on the Virginia Register of Historic Places. She opened her estate at Bloemendaal to children recovering from illnesses, and her provisions for its continuance ultimately led to the founding of Lewis Ginter Botanical Garden. A historical marker sponsored by St. Andrew's School commemorates Arents's contributions to the citizens of Richmond:

"Grace Evelyn Arents worked tirelessly as an urban reformer and philanthropist to improve the daily life of individuals regardless of race, gender, or class. She developed a church complex that included St. Andrew’s Episcopal Church, St. Andrew's School, the Grace Arents Free Library, a teachers' house, and a medical clinic. Arents also established a night school for working children, built public baths and playgrounds, and funded numerous social programs. She supported the formation of the Instructive Visiting Nurse Association. Her legacy continues in the activities of St. Andrew's Church, St. Andrew's School, and the William Byrd Community House in Oregon Hill."

=== Early years ===
Arents created an environment in which poor and working class children could receive a quality education. Her teaching philosophy, which addressed the multiple needs of the children in her care, remains an integral part of the school today. Arents's program focused on both academics and physical education. She also provided meals for students who spent the day working in factories such as the Tredegar Iron Works.

== Academics ==
St. Andrew's provides a full scholarship to each student. The school includes grades K through 5 with class sizes of 16 students or fewer. Parents, teachers, staff, volunteers, and donors support the school's daily operations.

St. Andrew's School adheres to the whole child approach to education, which posits that "each child, in each school, in each of our communities deserves to be healthy, safe, engaged, supported, and challenged." According to this philosophy, the physical and emotional health of students, as well as the development of stable, safe social relationships, is as much a part of an effective education process as academics. Family programming, which situates students and their learning within their larger social context, is a further element of the whole child approach to which St. Andrew's adheres. The head of school visits incoming kindergarteners at home in order to establish a relationship between families and the school. The school provides nutritious meals, such as breakfast, lunch, and snacks, to students on school days. Through the implementation of Social Emotional Learning (SEL), students work on emotional skills and learn to resolve conflicts productively.

Academics at St. Andrew's include a focus on reading, writing, social studies, and STEAM - science, technology, engineering, art/design, and math. Through STEAM, students explore the interconnections between disciplines. The curriculum includes a physical education component. The school remains affiliated with the Episcopal Church, and students attend chapel.
