= Grace Arents =

American philanthropist

- Born: 1848; New York City, U.S.
- Died: June 20, 1926 (aged 77–78); Henrico County, Virginia, U.S.
- Resting place: Hollywood Cemetery; Richmond, Virginia, U.S.
- Partner: Mary Garland Smith
- Relatives: Lewis Ginter (uncle)

Grace Evelyn Arents (1848 – June 20, 1926) was an heiress, Christian activist and philanthropist in Richmond, Virginia. She inherited $1.2 million from her uncle Lewis Ginter, a tobacco magnate, and she continued his philanthropic efforts in the Richmond area.

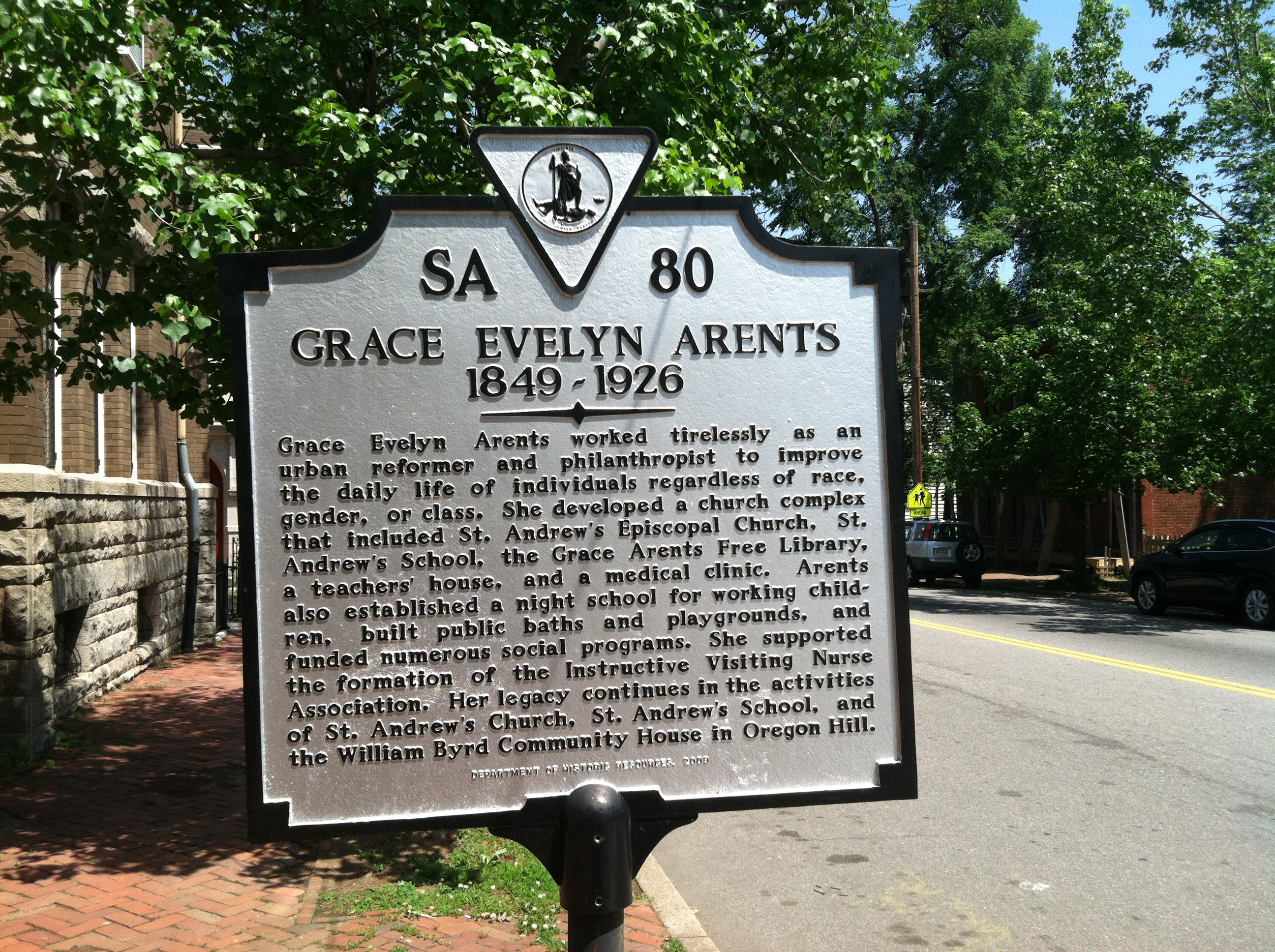
Grace Arents historical marker Oregon Hill

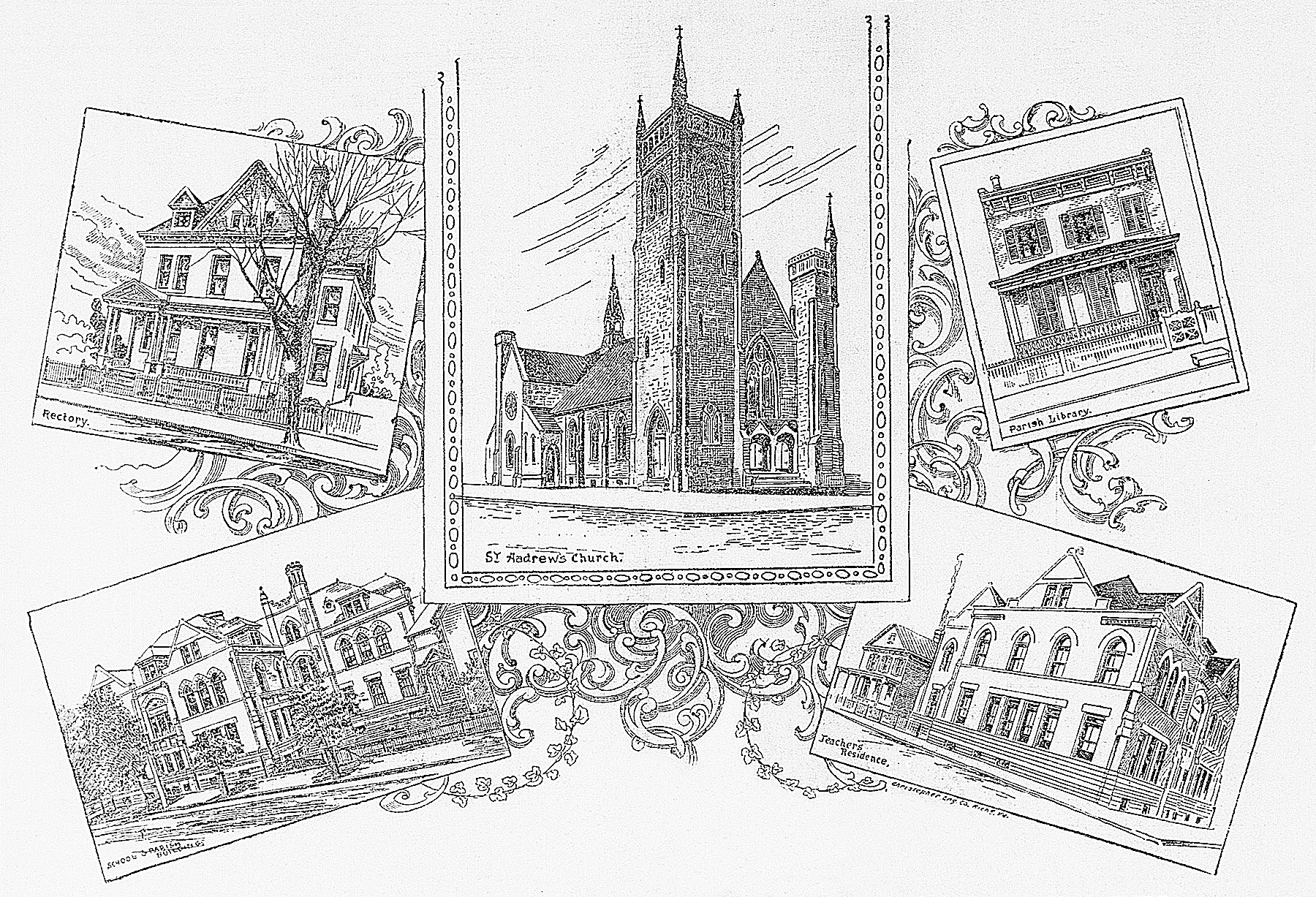
Architecture donated by Grace Arents to St. Andrew's parish.

== Early life ==
Arents was born in New York City, the sixth of seven children of cedar barrel maker Stephen Arents and his wife Jane Swain (née Ginter). When her husband died in 1855, Jane and her seven young children moved to Richmond to live under the protective wing of Ginter, who at the time was a wealthy dry goods wholesaler.

After the Civil War, the Arents family followed Ginter to New York City, where he became a banker. He returned to Richmond in 1874, and Grace Arents and her mother soon followed. They lived together at Ginter's home at 405 East Cary Street near the city's business district. Grace's brother George also lived with them briefly, but rejoined his other three sisters in New York, where he became an avid collector and benefactor of the New York Public Library.

In 1890, Grace's uncle landed a fortune as a founding member of the American Tobacco Company.

== Philanthropic career ==
Trained as a nurse, as was common with women in the deaconess movement of that era, Arents helped establish the Richmond chapter of the Instructional Visiting Nurse Association, which also drew upon the lessons of the Settlement House movement, exemplified by Jane Addams in Chicago, among other socially active women. Arents valued her privacy fiercely, as had her uncle, and avoided publicity. She also avoided an ostentatious lifestyle. Arents never posed for a public portrait and few images of her have been found. She supported the Episcopal Church and became known for her work among the city's poor, mostly in a self-effacing way, or simply through her checkbook.

When her uncle died in 1897, Arents inherited approximately $1.2 million, which she used to transform Richmond. One of her nicknames became the "Angel of Oregon Hill", referring to a poor neighborhood in her adopted city which received many of her philanthropic efforts.

She was a voracious reader and in 1899 established the Grace Arents Free Library on (224) Cherry Street in Oregon Hill, the first free circulating library in Richmond; the building later became the William Byrd Community House. Arents also financed the construction of three churches, including St. Andrew's, which was completed in 1903. Arents also donated money to establish a tuition-free school to teach neighborhood children, as well as a night school for working children and adults. She also built the first subsidized housing in the city.

Arents donated the Lewis Ginter Community Building for the Ginter Park neighborhood, one of three areas of north Richmond that her uncle had helped develop (the others were Bellevue Park and Sherwood Park). Arents also expanded and renovated the Lakeside Wheel Club, which her uncle had built, transforming it into a convalescent home for sick children. Later, as other facilities filled that social niche, she turned the estate into a home and garden, called Bloemendaal. Arents deeded a life estate to her partner Mary Garland Smith upon her death, after which the City of Richmond received the property for a public botanical garden, known as the Lewis Ginter Botanical Garden.

An elementary school for which Arents donated land and $5,000 towards building costs was completed in 1911 and named in her honor. Since 1989 the site has housed Open High School (Virginia). Arents also helped establish the Playground at Clark Springs, one of Richmond's first.

=== Charitable support ===
Among the many institutions she supported are:

- St. Andrew’s Episcopal Church and its free school
- Grace Arents Free Library on Cherry Street in Oregon Hill at 224 South Cherry in Oregon Hill (William Byrd Community House)
- Grace Arents School (now Open High School)
- Lewis Ginter Community Building for Ginter Park
- Lewis Ginter Botanical Garden
- St. Andrews School
- Instructional Visiting Nurse Association
- Playground at Clark Springs, one of Richmond's first.

== Death and legacy ==
Arents died on June 20, 1926, and is buried in the Hollywood Cemetery in Richmond. Arents bequethead one third of her fortune, as well as her estate, to her long-time companion, Mary Garland Smith, with whom she lived at Bloemendaal House. Arents' gravesite includes a sundial grave marker bordered by boxwoods near the mausoleum of her uncle. A Virginia historical marker commemorating her philanthropic career stands a few blocks from the cemetery entrance, next to St. Andrew's Episcopal Church. The obituary in the Richmond News Leader said enumeration of the "libraries, recreational centers, schools, churches, hospitals, and similar institutions" would be impossible to list.

On the 87th anniversary of her death, St. Andrew's Church commemorated her life and continued legacy. However, she remains virtually unknown, having ordered her journals and other correspondence destroyed at her death.

In 2018 the Virginia Capitol Foundation announced that Arents's name would be on the Virginia Women's Monument's glass Wall of Honor.
