= Open High School (Virginia) =

Public high school in Virginia

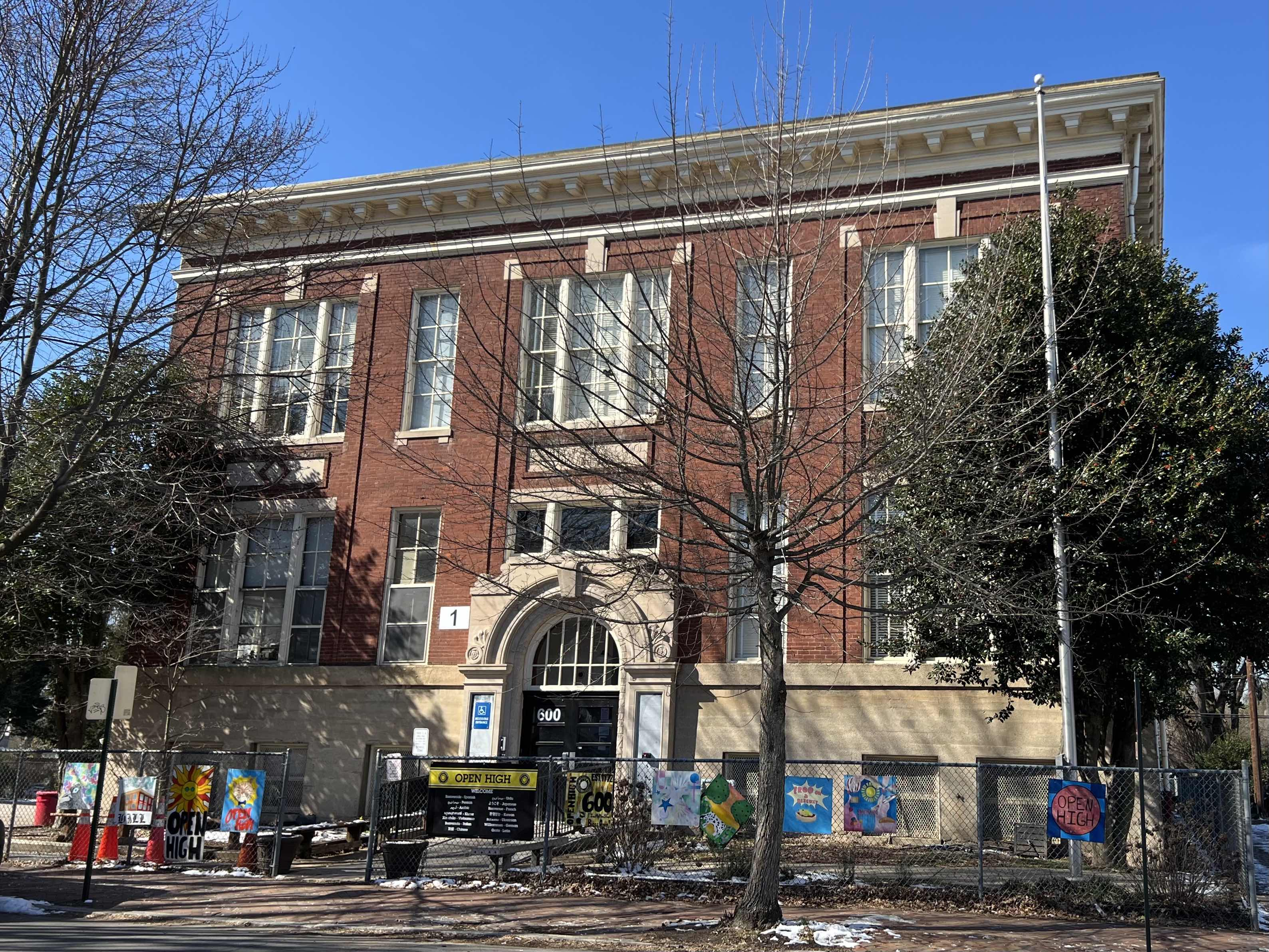

Location
- 600 S. Pine Street, Richmond, Virginia 23220; United States; 37.53769°N 77.45088°W

Information
- Type: public, alternative
- Motto: In a world where you can be anything, be Open!
- School district: Richmond Public Schools
- Principal: Candace Veney-Chaplin (Interim); Clary Carleton (Former)
- Grades: 9-12
- Enrollment: 174 (2024-2025)
- Website: https://ohs.rvaschools.net/

Open High School is an alternative public high school in the Oregon Hill neighborhood in Richmond, Virginia. It was established in 1972 with the intention of helping students become independent, self-determined thinkers and learners. Students volunteer at a variety of places, take college courses for high school and college credit, and independently develop and maintain a class schedule. The school building was originally built with money and on land donated by Grace Arents.

Athletics are held at the student's home school.

All students from Richmond, New Kent, Henrico and Hanover Counties are eligible to apply in ninth or tenth grade. The school has high academic requirements for admissions.

== Structure ==
Open High School has a community-based structure where advisory homeroom-like groups known as "families" direct students in the development of school activities, functions, and other school related activities. These families each have about 15 students. Each family selects two student representatives to represent them in a Student Representative Council.

At meetings of this council, student reps bring forth questions, disagreements, or ideas that the family might have and that they would like to bring forth to the student body. If a concern gets enough attention, or if an individual student would like to set it into motion, it is brought up during a monthly "town meeting", where the entire present administrative staff and entire present student body come together in order to discuss and vote on anything that a single student or group of students may deem important.

Due to its selective application system, and comparatively small school facility, Open High School has a lesser number of students than that of other schools in its district, Richmond Public Schools, allowing for a smaller student-teacher ratio.

Students are given the opportunity to create their own elective classes in combination with a teacher sponsor, known as a 'Thursday Class' These classes are typically unrelated to typical school material and instead, feature material the student or teacher deem important or compelling to convey. These classes can include guitar, crocheting, or theater courses at VCU.

== Notable alumni ==
- Anne Holton, Secretary of Education for the Commonwealth of Virginia from 2014 to 2016 and wife of Tim Kaine, who was the vice-presidential running mate of Hillary Clinton in the 2016 election.
- Aimee Mann, American rock singer.

== See also ==
- Alternative education
