= Lewis Ginter =

American businessman and philanthropist (1824–1897)

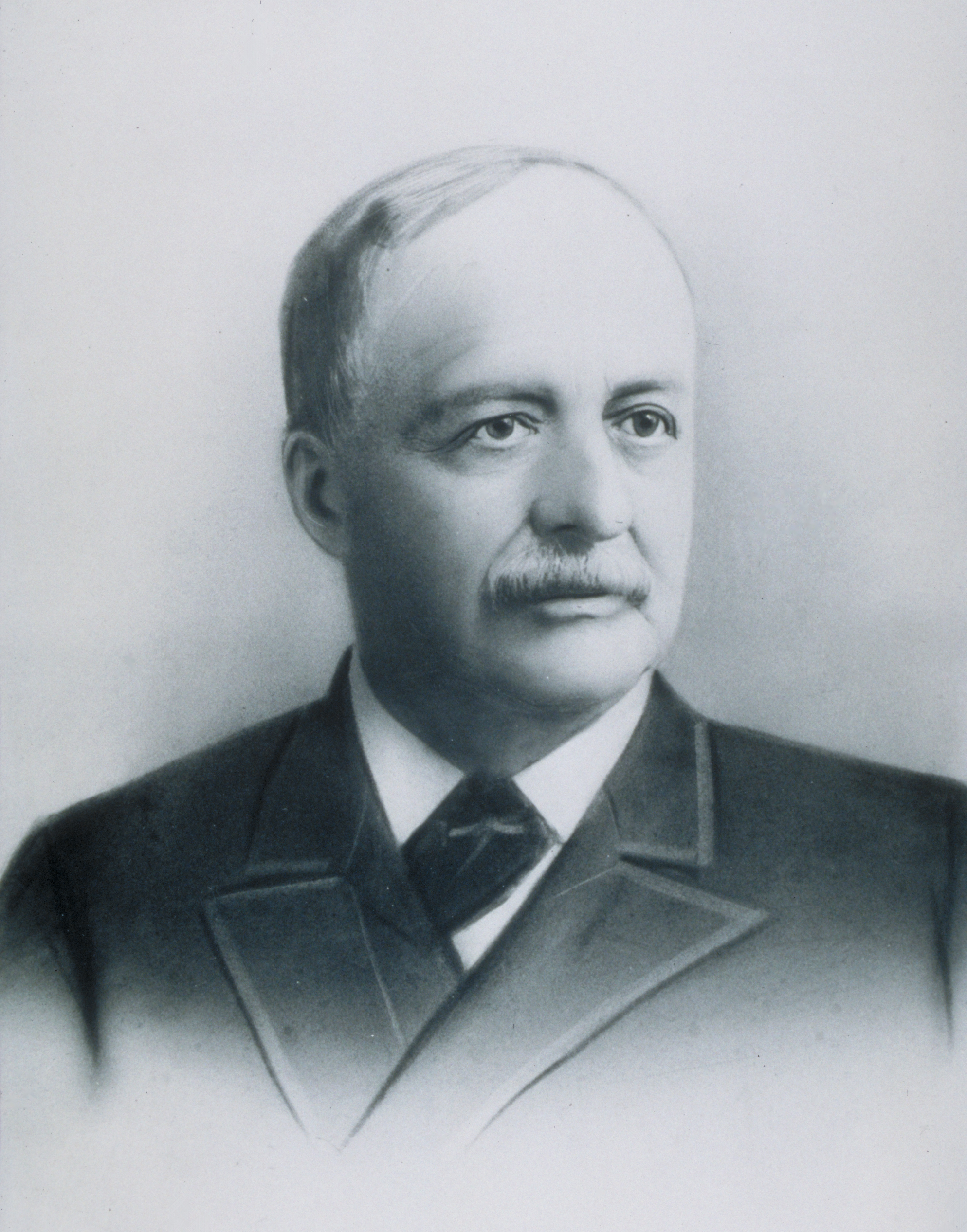
- Born: April 4, 1824; New York City, U.S.
- Died: October 2, 1897 (aged 73); Richmond, Virginia, U.S.
- Resting place: Hollywood Cemetery
- Other name: The Fighting Commissary
- Occupations: Businessman; financier; military officer; real estate developer; philanthropist
- Years active: 1842–1897
- Known for: Allen & Ginter; Jefferson Hotel; Ginter Park; American Tobacco Company
- Military career
- Allegiance: Confederate States
- Branch: Confederate States Army
- Service years: 1862–1865
- Rank: Major
- Conflicts: American Civil War; Evacuation and capture of Richmond; Battle of Appomattox Court House

Lewis Ginter (April 4, 1824 – October 2, 1897) was an American businessman, financier, military officer, real estate developer, and philanthropist based in Richmond, Virginia. He acquired his fortune through diverse business ventures and became one of Richmond's wealthiest citizens. Ginter served in the Confederacy at the rank of major and later played a role in reconstructing Richmond after the Civil War.

== Early life ==
Lewis Ginter was born on April 4, 1824, in New York City to Dutch immigrants John and Elizabeth Ginter. His father, who owned a grocery store, died shortly after his birth. After his mother died several years later, he was raised by his sister, Jane Ginter Arents.

== Early career ==
In 1842, at the age of 18, Ginter relocated to Richmond, Virginia to open a shop selling notions and toys. The business expanded into household furnishings, and by 1853, transitioned to marketing wholesale notions and imported fashionable goods to village and country merchants. In early 1860, his nephew George Arents joined the partnership of Ginter, Alvey & Arents. The business became "the largest wholesale notion house and handlers of white goods and Irish linen in the South." Ginter traveled throughout the United States and Europe to source merchandise and amassed a considerable fortune before the Civil War. Preparing for unpredictable times and in order to protect his wealth, Ginter invested in large quantities of tobacco, sugar, and cotton that were stored in Richmond warehouses.

== Military service ==
Although he was originally from the North, Lewis Ginter supported his new home in the Confederacy, buying Confederate bonds and waiving outstanding debts. Shortly after the war broke out, he volunteered in the Confederate Quartermaster Department in Richmond, amassing supplies for the troops. He joined the Confederate Army as a commissary with the rank of Major in 1862 and was commended by his superiors for his deeds on and off the battlefield, earning him the nickname "The Fighting Commissary." Major Ginter served under Generals Robert E. Lee, Joseph R. Anderson, Stonewall Jackson, A.P. Hill, and Edward Lloyd Thomas, and retained this title from Southern contemporaries long after the war ended. He was in the Confederate capital during the evacuation and capture of Richmond and retreated to Amelia Court House, Virginia, to meet up with the remaining members of his brigade. He was also present during Lee's surrender at Appomattox Court House, and returned to Richmond several days later.

== New York ==
On his return to Richmond, Ginter found the city in a state of ruin. Though his cotton remained, his warehouse stores of tobacco and sugar had been destroyed in a fire that had consumed much of the business district. With little economic opportunity remaining in Richmond, he sold the cotton and returned to New York City to pursue a career in banking. He experienced short-lived success at the firm of Harrison & Company, with the Black Friday gold panic of 1869 forcing Ginter to settle heavy debts that his firm had incurred. Having lost all of his wealth once again, he sold tobacco on consignment in New York for Richmond tobacconist John F. Allen. In 1872, Ginter decided to return to Richmond.

== Return to Richmond ==
=== Tobacco ===
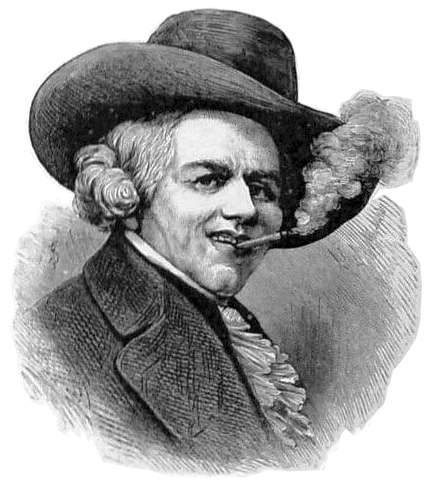
The Allen & Ginter logo

In 1872, Ginter joined John F. Allen to form John F. Allen & Company, which manufactured chewing tobacco, pipe tobacco, and a small line of cigars. In addition to strong "Turkish" tobaccos, the firm became the first to manufacture cigarettes with milder bright leaf tobacco, grown in the Virginia and North Carolina piedmont. Early production began in a factory where twenty young women hand-rolled cigarettes. When the firm released its first cigarettes in 1875, it was the first in the South to manufacture cigarettes as its primary branded product.

Initially, sales were unsuccessful in the South, where chewing tobacco was overwhelmingly preferred. However, with help from his agent, John Morgan Richards, Ginter's "Richmond Gem" cigarettes became popular in London where they were marketed as a foreign novelty. Their brands included "Richmond Straight-Cut No. 1," "The Pet," "Dubec," "Opera Puffs," and "Our Little Beauties."

Around 1880, the firm was renamed Allen & Ginter. In 1881, increasing competition in the tobacco industry led the firm to begin leasing James Bonsack's newly invented cigarette rolling machine. By 1888, Allen & Ginter employed over 1,000 workers, increasing cigarette production from 100,000 per month to 2,000,000 per day. In order to meet foreign demand, the firm eventually opened offices in London, Paris, and Berlin. In January of 1890, the successful Allen & Ginter merged with J. B. Duke, Kinney Brothers Tobacco Company, Goodwin & Company, and W.S. Kimball & Company to form the American Tobacco Company. Ginter declined an offer to be president of the company, remaining a director until his death in 1897.

=== Real estate ===
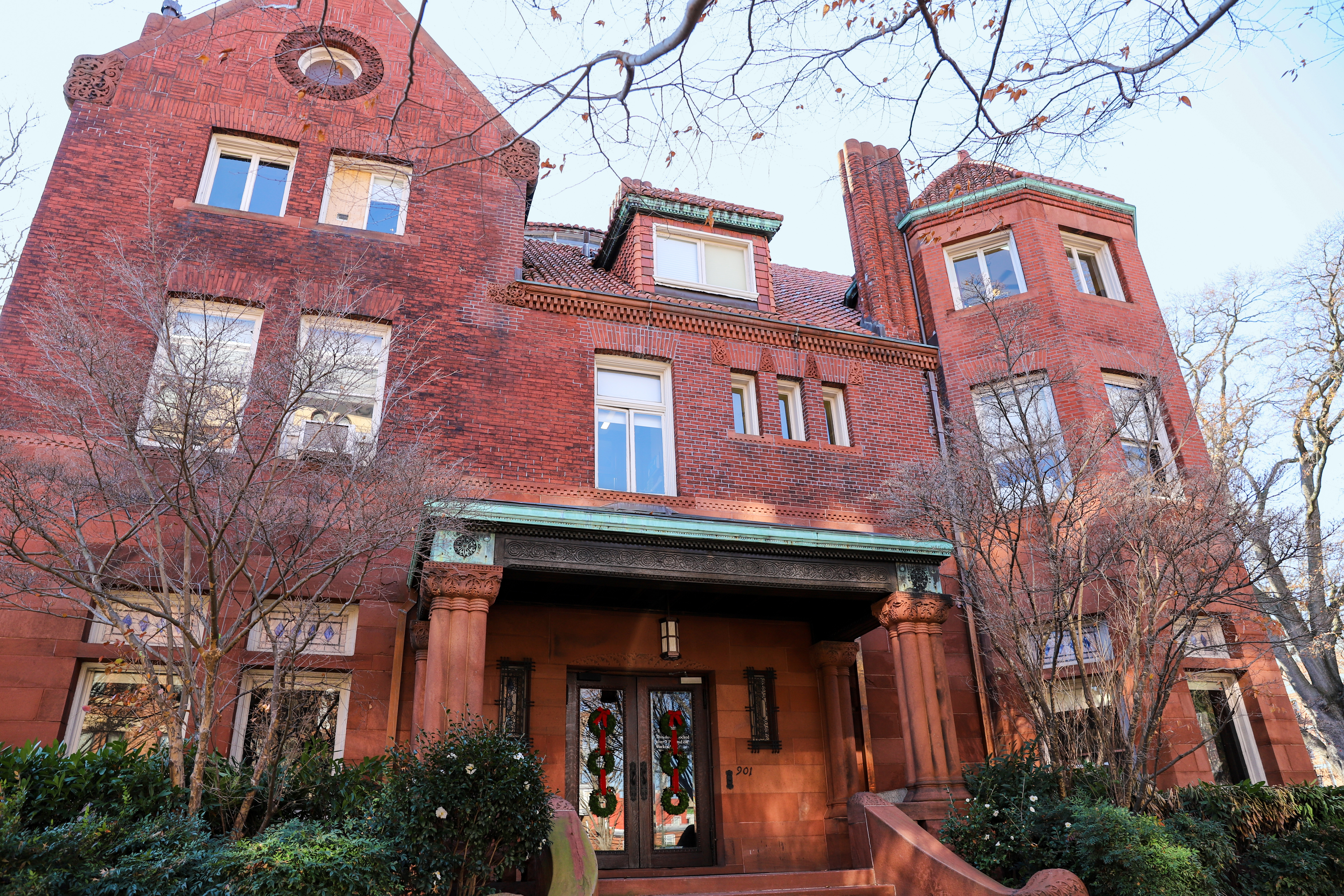
Former Ginter Mansion at 901 West Franklin Street, Richmond

In 1876, after living in Richmond for several decades, Ginter purchased his first home at 405 East Cary Street, where he lived with his sister, Jane Arents, and three of her daughters, Grace, Joanna, and Minnie. In 1891, he completed construction of a Richardsonian Romanesque mansion at 901 West Franklin Street, a fashionable neighborhood in Richmond. The house was later acquired by Virginia Commonwealth University as the "Ginter House." In September 2020, the University’s Board of Visitors voted to de-commemorate and rename several buildings on campus named for individuals associated with the Confederacy, including Ginter's home. The house is now known as the "VCU Administration Building".

Ginter was inspired by the suburban developments he saw in Australia on business trips marketing for Allen & Ginter. Beginning in 1888, Ginter and his associate John Pope (see below) began assembling tracts of land just north of Richmond in Henrico County, with the intention of developing an upscale streetcar suburb. Their purchases included part of the former Westbrook Plantation, which they developed into their own country estate. Ginter's renovated and enlarged Westbrook house included a private barbershop. An outbuilding featured an automated, one-lane bowling alley. Ginter and Pope divided the large swaths of land into residential plots and provided many amenities, such as artesian wells, tile sewer lines, roads covered with crushed stone, and the extension of the Richmond Union Passenger Railway, the nation's first large-scale electric streetcar system. The neighborhood, known as Ginter Park, attracted the Union Theological Seminary and was eventually annexed to the City of Richmond. Ginter also laid the groundwork for several adjoining neighborhoods, including Bellevue Park and Sherwood Park. He established the Lakeside Wheel Club in 1895 and Lakeside Park in 1896.

In 1892, Ginter hired architects Carrère and Hastings to design the Jefferson Hotel. An estimated 5 to 10 million dollars were invested before it opened on October 31, 1895. Ginter commissioned Edward V. Valentine to create a life-size sculpture of Thomas Jefferson from Carrara marble to be displayed as the centerpiece of the upper lobby. Additional novelties included then-exotic palm trees from Central and South America, numerous antiques, Turkish and Russian baths, electric elevators, and, for a brief period, alligators in the lobby fountain.

== John Pope ==
While working in New York City after the war, Ginter met John Pope, a messenger boy who delivered packages to his firm. Pope was born in New York City in 1856 to a German immigrant family. His father was a shoemaker, and Pope took the delivery job at the age of 14 to help his family make ends meet. Ginter eventually hired Pope to work in the New York tobacco depot. When Ginter relocated back to Richmond, he brought Pope along with him as his apprentice and companion.

The two began an enduring partnership that would last for the remainder of their lives. Pope grew to become Ginter's trusted business partner and assumed a number of executive roles, including Vice President of Allen & Ginter in 1888, and President of the Crystal Ice Company, James River Marl and Bone Phosphate Company, and Powhatan Clay Manufacturing Company. When the American Tobacco Company was formed in 1890, Pope served as vice president and managed the centralized cigarette operations in Richmond. Like Ginter, Pope was involved in a number of philanthropic activities and strove to avoid the public eye.

Neither Ginter nor Pope ever married. They lived together in Ginter's home until Pope's premature death in 1896. Pope was buried in a plot in Hollywood Cemetery that Ginter had bought for himself. While the precise nature of their relationship is unknown, Pope's obituary said he "lived quietly with Major Lewis, for whom he possessed the most ardent affection," while Ginter's own obituary said he "never pointedly sought" the company of women.

== Death ==
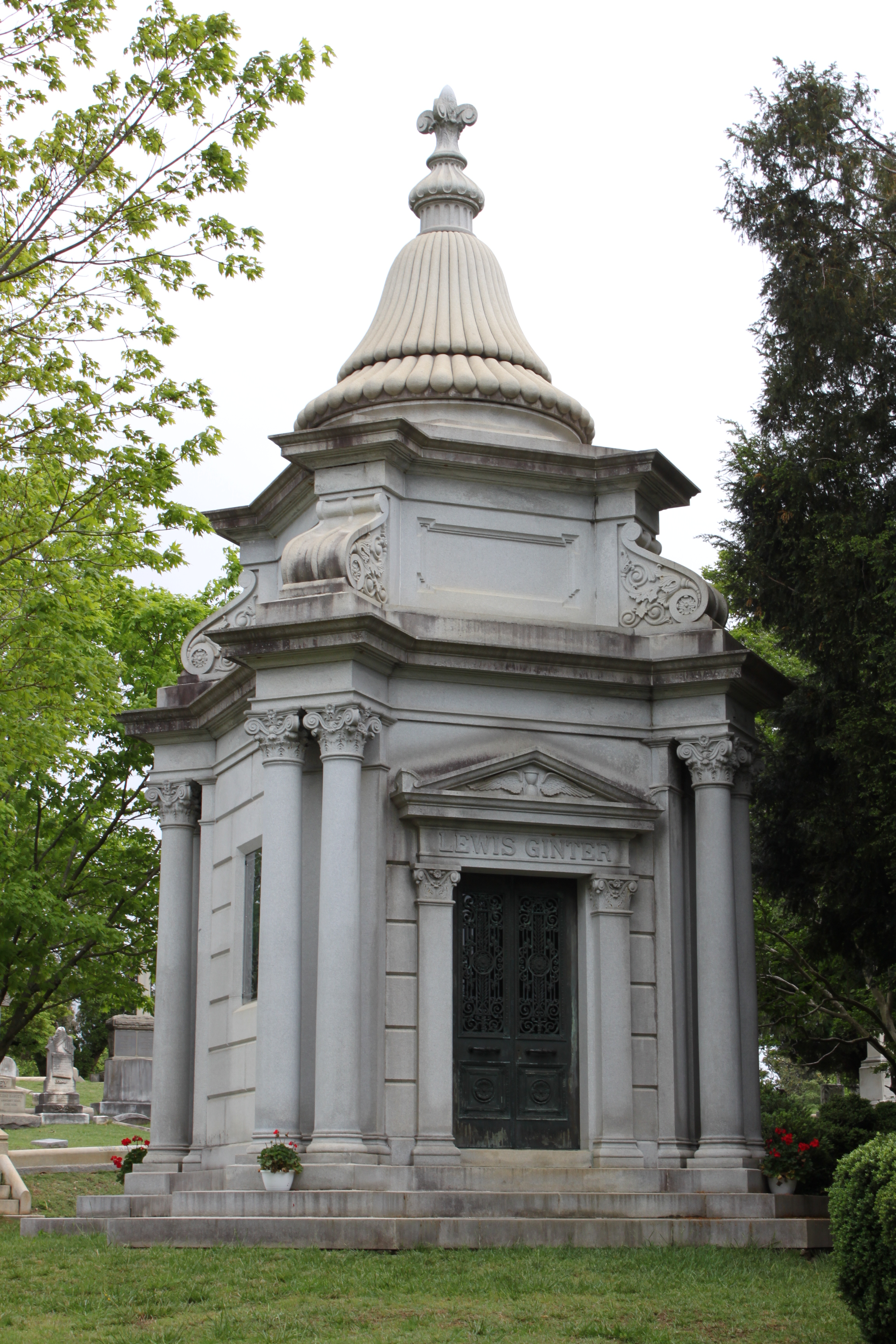
Lewis Ginter's mausoleum at Hollywood Cemetery

John Pope's death had a profound impact on Ginter. He had suffered from diabetes, and his health quickly declined before becoming bedridden at his Westbrook estate. After two months of severe debilitation, Lewis Ginter died on October 2, 1897. His funeral was described as one of the largest in Richmond's history, and his remains were subsequently placed in a private mausoleum in Hollywood Cemetery, overlooking the James River.

== Legacy ==
At the time of his death, Ginter had amassed one of the largest personal fortunes in the South. He made significant investments in real estate, business, and philanthropic activities in Richmond. While traveling abroad, he also reportedly ordered items from Richmond to support local merchants. His will included gifts to almost every charity and public institution in the city. The remainder of his wealth was left to his relatives, including his niece, Grace Arents, who used her considerable inheritance to fund numerous philanthropic causes herself. She converted the Lakeside Wheel Club into a progressive farm known as Bloemendaal, which she later arranged to become Lewis Ginter Botanical Garden. She developed St. Andrew's Episcopal Church and St. Andrew's School, built playgrounds, and funded schools and medical institutions.

In 1897, the Richmond Dispatch praised Lewis Ginter as "one whose public spirit and broad charity have made his name familiar and honored throughout this city, which he loved so well, did so much to build up and beautify".
