= St. Andrew's Church (Richmond, Virginia) =

Historic church in Virginia, US

- U.S. National Register of Historic Places
- Virginia Landmarks Register
- Richmond City Historic District
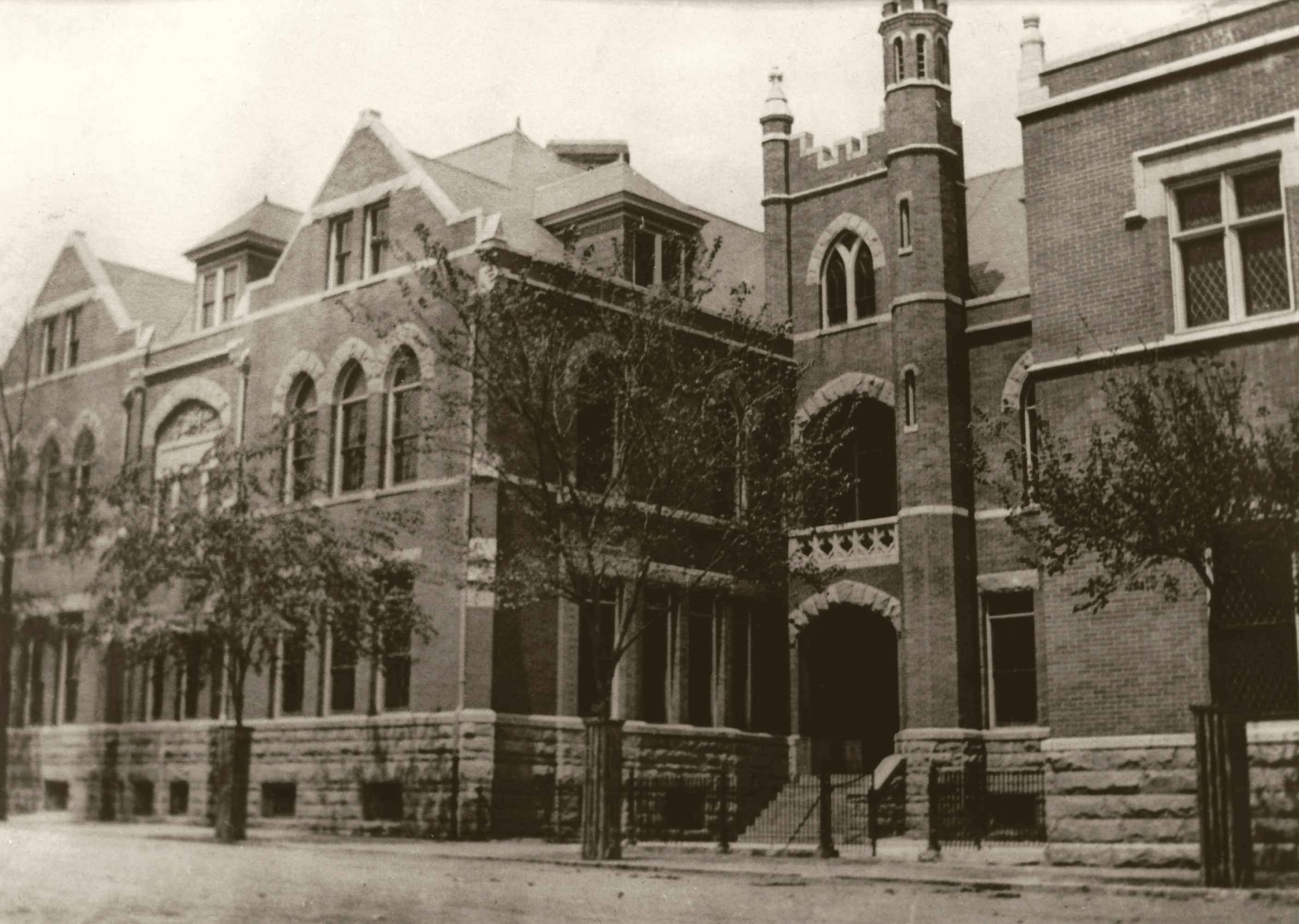
- St. Andrew's School, early 1900s

- Location within Virginia Location within the United States Location within the United States
- Location: 223, 224, and 227 S. Cherry St., Richmond, Virginia
- Coordinates: 37°32′31.85″N 77°27′8.23″W
- Area: 2 acres (0.81 ha)
- Built: 1901
- Architect: A.H. Ellwood; Noland & Baskerville
- Architectural style: Gothic
- NRHP reference No.: 79003294
- VLR No.: 127-0314

Significant dates
- Added to NRHP: June 22, 1979
- Designated VLR: April 17, 1979

St. Andrew's Church is an historic Episcopal church complex in Richmond, Virginia, United States. The complex consists of the church (1901), school (1901), parish hall (1904), Instructive Nurse Association Building (1904), and William Byrd Community House or Arents Free Library (1908). The church is a rough-faced Virginia granite, cruciform Gothic Revival style structure dominated by a 115-foot corner tower. The school and parish hall are three-story, brick buildings on a stone basements.

The woodwork for the structures was provided by Richmond Wood Working Company. A.H. Ellwood and Noland & Baskerville are credited as the architects. The Gothic Revival architecture site was added to the National Register of Historic Places in 1979.

== See also ==
- William Byrd Community House
- Grace Arents
