= Lakeside Wheel Club =

Coordinates: 37.62254°N 77.46918°W

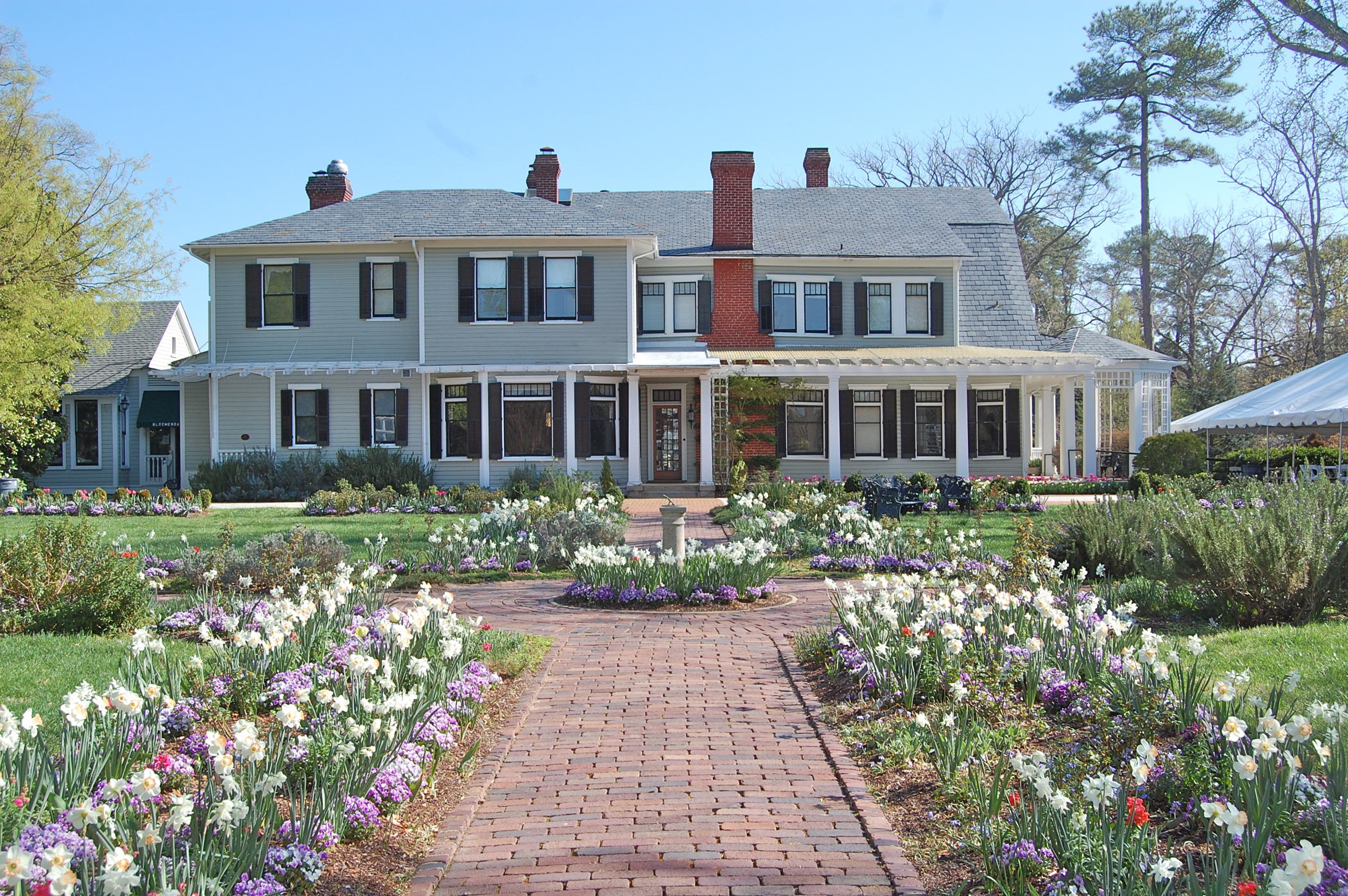
Bloemendaal at the Lewis Ginter Botanical Gardens

The Bloemendaal House, originally the Lakeside Wheel Club, is a clubhouse in Richmond, Virginia originally built by Lewis Ginter in 1895.

Around 1911, after the "cycle" fell out of vogue, Ginter's niece, Grace Arents, converted the structure into a convalescent home for poor children suffering from tuberculosis and other city-borne illnesses. She remodeled the building and had a second story added. After the founding of the Instructional Visiting Nurses Association, the convalescent home was no longer needed. In 1913, Grace Arents transformed it into a home for herself and her companion, Mary Garland Smith. Grace Arents named the place Bloemendaal, in homage to the Ginter family's Dutch ancestors (Bloemendaal means "valley of flowers" and she planted gardens on the property). Grace Arents died in 1926 and left the property to the City of Richmond, with the stipulation that after Smith died it was to be developed into a botanical garden honoring Lewis Ginter. Smith died in 1968 on her 97th birthday.

The city of Richmond took possession of the property, but it languished. Later, the property and its gardens were rescued by botanists, horticulturists and passionate citizens, who formed the Lewis Ginter Botanical Garden, Inc. Now, the Bloemendaal House is part of the Lewis Ginter Botanical Garden.

== Lakeside Wheel Club ==
Upon Lewis Ginter's return to Richmond from Australia in 1888, he began acquiring land just north of Richmond. He built the Lakeside Wheel Club on land he purchased in 1894. The clubhouse was a one-story Victorian structure surrounded on two sides by a covered veranda. The original concrete approach walks with their inlaid leaf patterns, the steps, concrete newel posts and wrought iron lamp standards remain today. The adjacent valley and waterways had long been the site of a millpond and were dammed to create Lakeside Lake.

In the Gay Nineties cycling was a fashionable sport, and members of the club, cheered on by Richmond belles, pedaled out on the cinder-paved Missing Link Trail, which ran parallel to the Boulevard and connected to Hermitage Road. Spectators of the cycling sport rode out on the Lakeside trolley and were discharged at the end of the line near the dam. After the grueling ride from town, members could sit on the wheel club's long veranda and refresh themselves with homemade ice cream, while boaters drifted on the lake below. In 1896, north of the lake, Ginter established public Lakeside Park, with a zoo and Richmond's first professional nine-hole golf course. The granite base of the bear pit and many fine specimens of trees planted in an arboretum setting remain at the present day Jefferson Lakeside Club.

When Lewis Ginter died in 1897, a large portion of his estate was inherited by his niece, Grace Arents. Arents devoted her life to philanthropy and gave generously to many causes and institutions. She was especially interested in helping the children of Oregon Hill. She conceived the idea of a convalescent home in the country for sick infants who might benefit from the fresh air. To realize her dream, Miss Arents purchased the abandoned Lakeside Wheel Clubhouse and its approximately 10 acres (40,000 m^{2}) from the Lewis Ginter Land and Improvement Company. The structure was remodeled in the Dutch colonial style and named Bloemendaal Farm after a small village in the Netherlands which was the Ginter ancestral home. The name translates to "flower valley."

The roof was raised to provide a second floor of bedrooms, a classroom, a library and a playroom for the sick children. Miss Arents traveled extensively in Europe, and her trip diaries describe the joy she derived from her visits to continental botanical gardens. Her interest in horticulture, already strong, was heightened by her travels and found abundant expression at Bloemendaal Farm. She imported collections of rare trees and shrubs, constructed a series of three ridge and furrow greenhouses and laid out a border of herbaceous perennials along the side of the greenhouse range. Her great love of roses is evident in the photographs of Bloemendaal Farm taken in the 1920s. This garden, adjacent to the Bloemendaal House, exists today as the Grace Arents Garden. The immense ginkgo on the front lawn, the massive American hollies and the southern magnolias were planted by Miss Arents. Over the years, Miss Grace added piecemeal to the original acreage. Thus, she reunited some of the land that had belonged to the Powhatans, Patrick Henry, the Williamsons, John Robinson and others, and Bloemendaal Farm became widely known as a model for the best agricultural practices of the day. Seventy-eight-year-old Grace Arents died suddenly on June 20, 1926, leaving Bloemendaal Farm to the City of Richmond as a botanical garden and public park in perpetual memory of her Uncle Lewis Ginter to be known as Lewis Ginter Botanical Garden.
