= Jefferson Hotel (Richmond, Virginia) =

Historic hotel in Richmond, Virginia, US

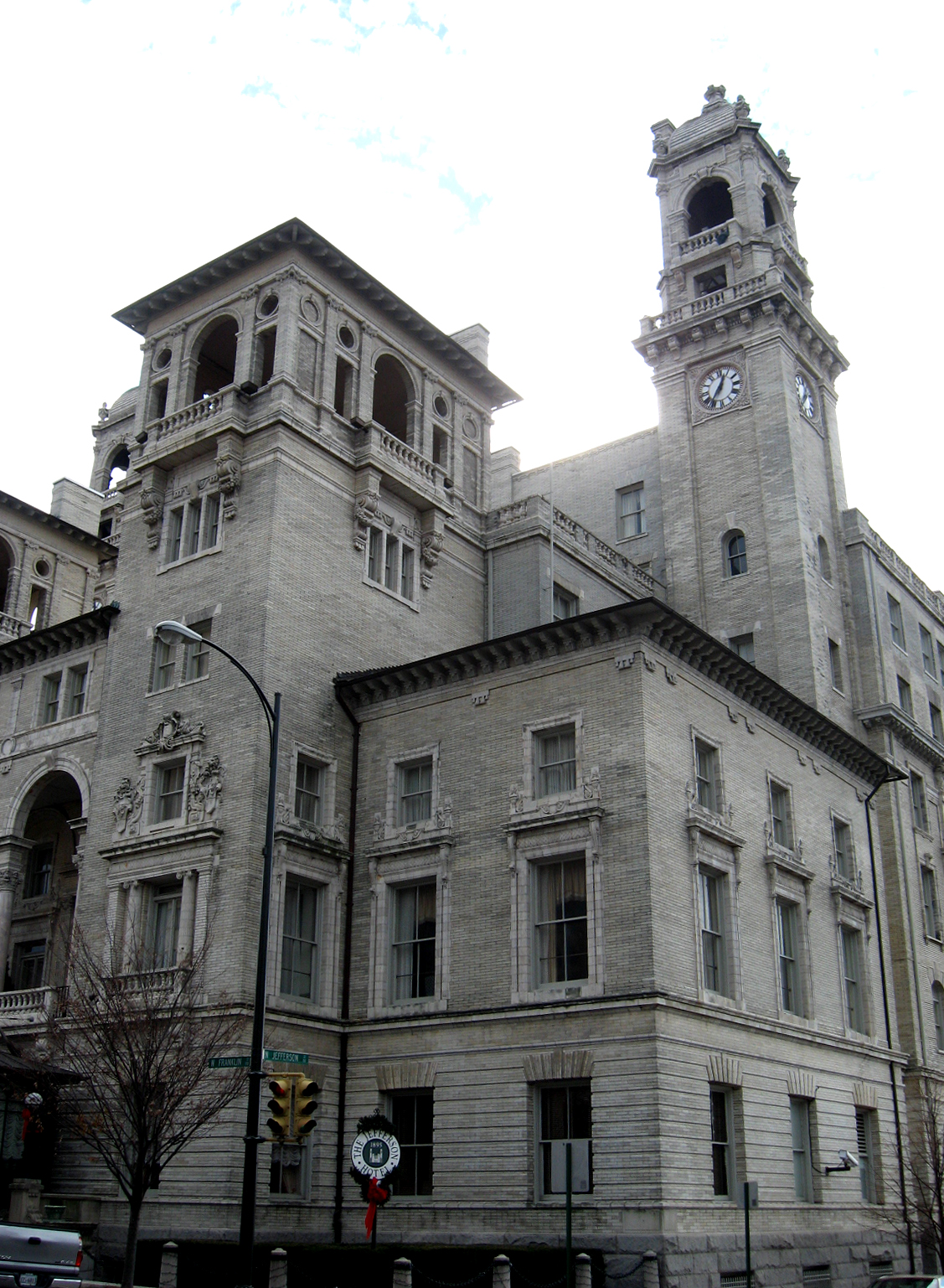
- The historic Jefferson Hotel in downtown Richmond

General information
- Location: 101 W Franklin St., Richmond, Virginia, U.S., 23220
- Coordinates: 37°32′39.42″N 77°26′43.09″W
- Opening: October 31, 1895
- Owner: CCA Financial

Technical details
- Floor count: 6

Other information
- Number of rooms: 166
- Number of suites: 15
- Number of restaurants: 2
- Parking: on-site valet and self parking

Website
- www.jeffersonhotel.com
- Jefferson Hotel
- U.S. National Register of Historic Places
- Virginia Landmarks Register
- Richmond City Historic District
- Location within Virginia Location within the United States
- Location: 104 W. Main St., Richmond, Virginia
- Coordinates: 37°32′39″N 77°26′44″W
- Area: 1.5 acres (0.61 ha)
- Built: 1895
- Architects: Carrère and Hastings, J. Kevan Peebles
- Architectural style: Late 19th and early 20th century American Movements
- NRHP reference No.: 69000351
- VLR No.: 127-0001

Significant dates
- Added to NRHP: June 4, 1969
- Designated VLR: November 5, 1968

The Jefferson Hotel is a luxury hotel in Richmond, Virginia, United States, opened in 1895. In 1969, it was listed on the National Register of Historic Places.

The Jefferson is a member of Historic Hotels of America, the official program of the National Trust for Historic Preservation. On site is "Lemaire", a restaurant named after Etienne Lemaire, who served as maitre d’hotel to Thomas Jefferson from 1794 through the end of his presidency.

== History ==
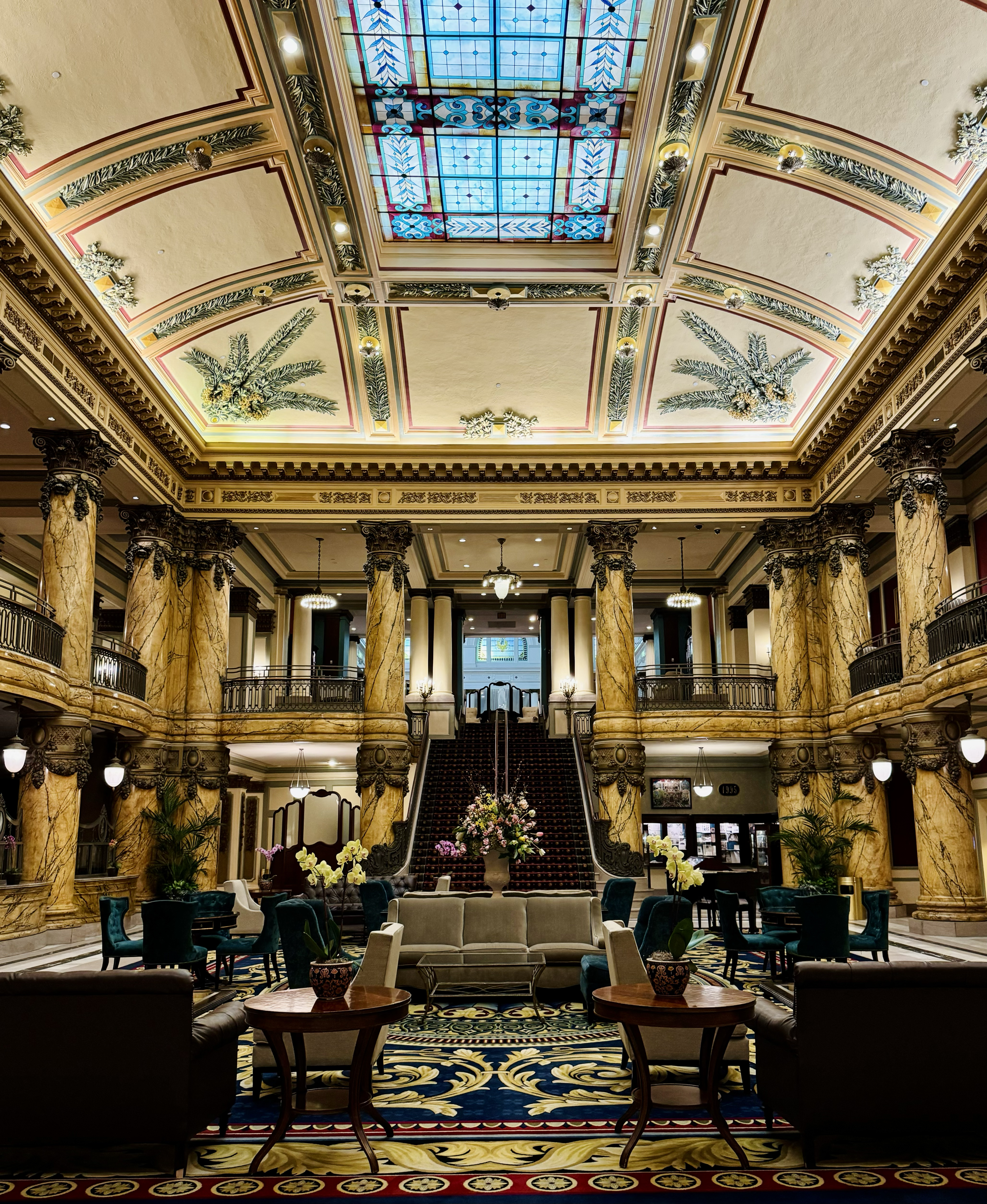
Lobby of The Jefferson Hotel in Richmond, VA 2024.

The hotel was developed in 1892 by tobacco baron Lewis Ginter in Richmond, Virginia. The hotel opened for business on October 31, 1895. It was designed in the Spanish Baroque Style by Carrère and Hastings.

After a fire gutted three-fifths of the hotel in March 1901, it underwent a lengthy restoration by Norfolk architect J. Kevan Peebles. The marble statue of Thomas Jefferson sculpted by Edward Virginius Valentine was almost destroyed. The statue was carried to safety during the fire. During the rescue process, the head broke off. Eventually, the sculpture was repaired. In March 1944, another fire occurred. Six people were killed during the fire.

In the check-in lobby, known as the Palm Court, nine original stained glass Tiffany windows with the hotel's monogram remain. The three stained glass windows above the front desk and the stained glass dome are reproductions.

Patrons have included thirteen United States presidents, writers, and celebrities, including Henry James, Charles Lindbergh, The Rolling Stones, Dolly Parton, Elvis Presley, and Anthony Hopkins.

=== Alligators in the lobby ===
In his autobiography The Moon's a Balloon (1972), Academy Award-winning actor David Niven described a trip from New York to Florida in the late 1930s, during which he decided to spend the night at the Jefferson Hotel. Niven said that, as he was signing the guest registry in the lobby, his eyes snapped open with amazement when he noticed a full-sized alligator swimming in a small pool located six feet from the reception desk. The alligators at the Jefferson became world-famous. Old Pompey, the last alligator living in the marble pools of the Jefferson's Palm Court, survived until 1948. (Note: Currently, the space that was filled with alligators is now a statue of Thomas Jefferson.) Bronze statues of the alligators now decorate the hotel. Its restaurant, Lemaire, has a theme of alligator motifs.

== In culture ==
The hotel and its restaurant were used for filming interior scenes for the 1981 American film My Dinner with Andre, featuring Wallace Shawn and Andre Gregory.

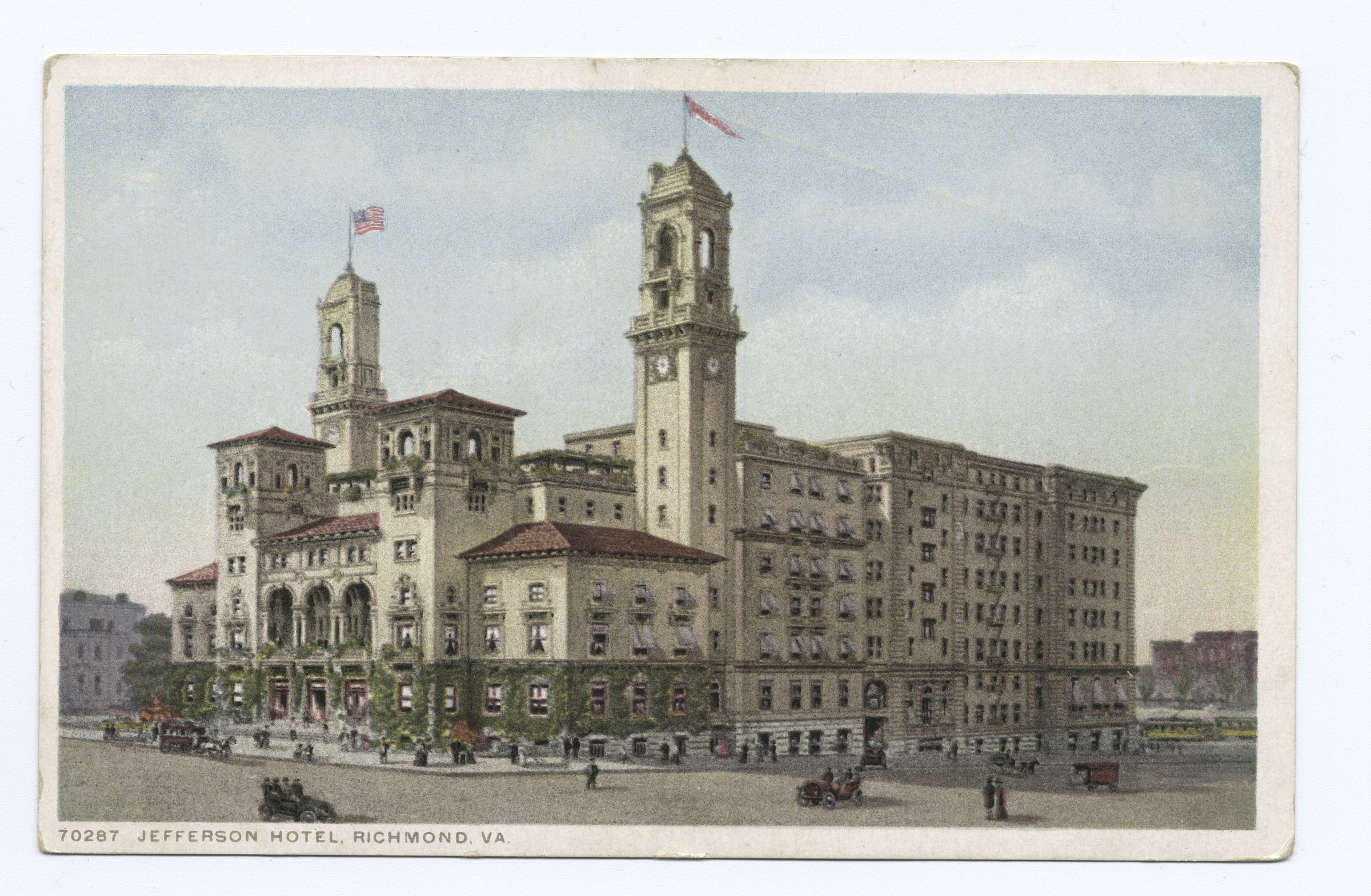
Jefferson Hotel, early 20th century

== See also ==
- National Register of Historic Places listings in Richmond, Virginia
