= Lewis Ginter Botanical Garden =

Botanical garden in Virginia, U.S.

Coordinates: 37.6212°N 77.4711°W

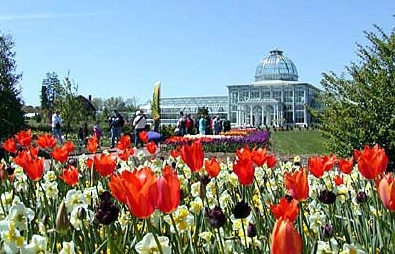
- Interactive map of Lewis Ginter Botanical Garden
- Type: Botanical garden
- Location: 1800 Lakeside Avenue, Richmond, Virginia 23228
- Area: 50 acres (20 ha)
- Opened: 1984
- Collections: Conservatory, Rose Garden, Children's Garden, Fountain Garden, Asian Garden, Victorian Garden, Woodland Garden, Healing Garden, Children's Garden, Perennial Garden, Edible Display Garden, Kroger Community Kitchen Garden
- Website: www.lewisginter.org

Lewis Ginter Botanical Garden is a 50-acre (20 ha) botanical garden in Henrico County, just outside of Richmond, Virginia. It features over a dozen themed gardens, a conservatory, a library, and a café.

Lewis Ginter Botanical Garden also hosts select days, typically July 4 and Labor Day, where admission is free to the community. Lewis Ginter Botanical Garden offers seasonal exhibitions, art exhibitions, special events and seasonal evening hours with live music. Tours, classes and select special events typically have an additional fee.

== History ==
Once the "Oughnum" hunting ground of Powhatan Indians, the land was later owned by Virginia Governor Patrick Henry. 10 acres (4.0 ha) were purchased in 1884 by Richmond businessman Lewis Ginter, where he established the Lakeside Wheel Club. The club only operated for a few years as the bicycling craze was short lived.

The cycling club and land went unused after Ginter's death in 1897. His niece, Grace Arents, purchased the property from the estate, remodeling and expanding the abandoned cottage used by the club into the Lakeside Sanatorium for Babies in 1912.

The children's convalescent home operated for two years before Arents made it her home, with her companion Mary Garland Smith, calling it Bloemendaal House ("valley of flowers") in honor of the family's Dutch heritage. Adjacent properties were purchased, bringing the total size to 73 acres (30 ha).

Mary Garland Smith continued to live there after her companion's death in 1926 until her death at age 100 in 1968. Arents willed the property to the city of Richmond with the stipulation that it be developed into a botanical garden honoring her uncle. The city used the property as a tree nursery and greenhouse supplying bedding plants for city parks for 13 years while plans to establish a botanical garden were investigated.

In 1981, the non-profit Lewis Ginter Botanical Garden corporation was chartered to finally establish the botanical garden using funds from the Grace E. Arents Trust. Additional adjacent land was purchased and The Pittsburgh landscape architecture firm of Environmental Planning and Design was hired in 1987 and announced a master plan for the gardens later that year. The gardens were named among the most beautiful by readers of Conde Nast magazine and USA Today in 2017.

A $41 million capital campaign completed in 2004 provided the garden's major facilities for horticulture, education and community events. Significant structures include The Robins Visitors Center (1999), Massey Greenhouses (1999), Education and Library Complex (2002), classical glass-domed Conservatory (2003), and Children's Garden (2005).

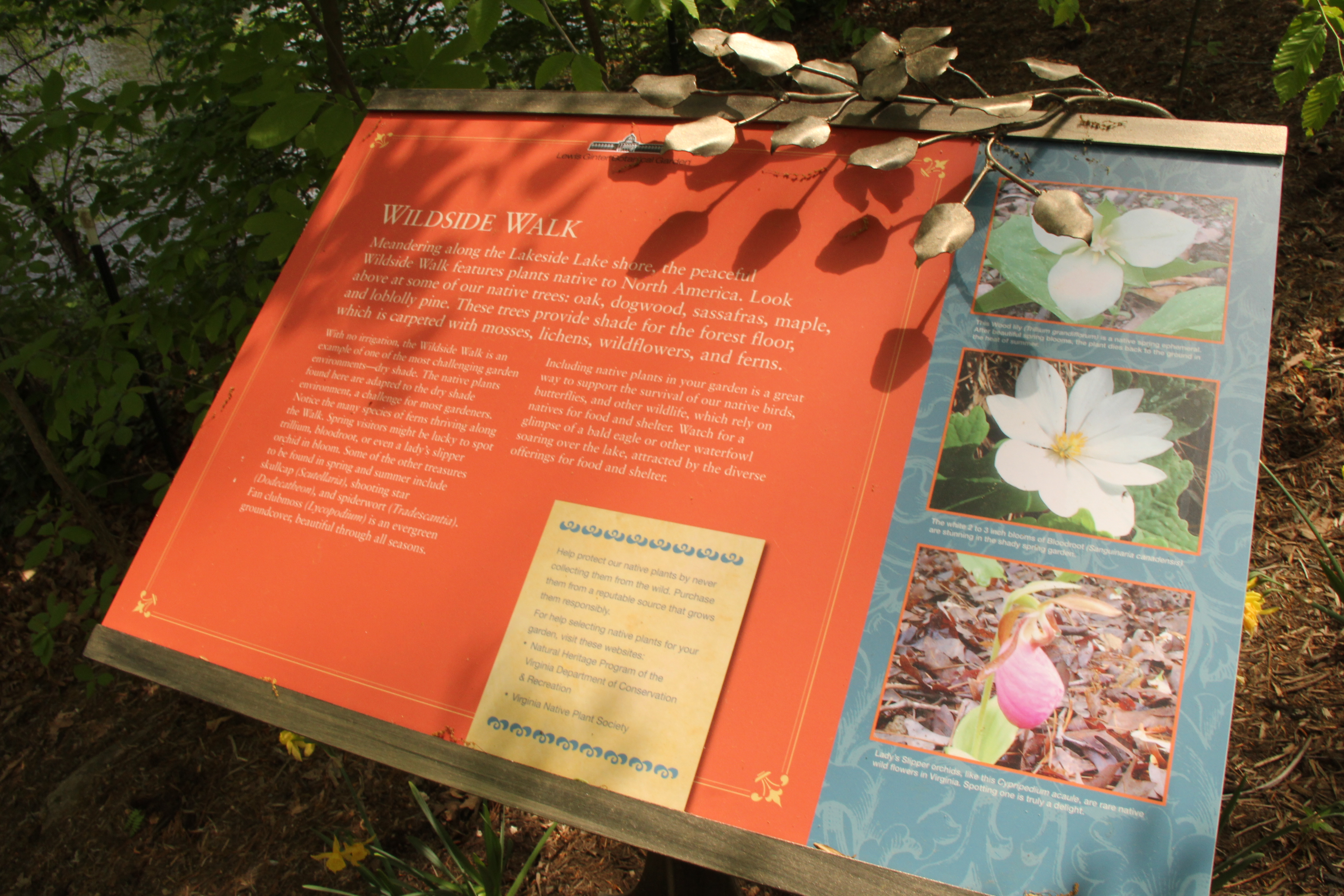
Many educational signs throughout the gardens provide information to visitors.

The addition of the Education and Library Complex in October 2002 greatly expanded educational offerings to new, diverse constituencies. A year-long series of educational programs in 2003 introduced the new complex and featured nationally prominent speakers. The series attracted almost 4,000 people from all areas of Richmond and most regions of Virginia, as well as other nearby states. The increased capacity and effectiveness of the educational facilities have generated a 61% increase in registration for the garden's regular adult education programs in the three years since the complex opened.

Virginia Commonwealth University houses its herbarium at the botanical gardens. The Flora of Virginia project uses this herbarium in its preparation of a modern state Flora to be published by the University of Virginia Press. In an ongoing collaboration, Lewis Ginter Botanical Garden, Virginia Tech, and the Virginia Nurserymen and Landscape Association have joined forces in a Plant Introduction Program which selects, tests, propagates and distributes to growers and garden centers new or uncommon ornamental plant species which adapt well to Virginia growing conditions.

The botanical garden opened a $31 million expansion project in May 2026, titled THRIVE: A Campaign for Communities. The project formally broke ground in April 2024. Union-eligible employees have not received any raises during this time.

The workers of Lewis Ginter Botanical Garden unionized with the International Association of Machinists and Aerospace Workers in November 2024 to form LGBG Workers United. The union held a one-day strike in July 2026 over wage disputes. Musicians Jesse Welles and Graham Nash cancelled planned concerts at the garden in solidarity with the union. The union went on strike in September 2026 after a breakdown in contract negotiations.

== Events ==
Each year during the winter holidays, Lewis Ginter hosts Dominion Energy GardenFest of Lights drawing thousands of visitors. An exhibit featuring hundreds of live tropical butterflies is hosted during spring, summer and early fall months in the conservatory. Concerts and Easter themed children's activities are offered in the spring.

== Gallery ==
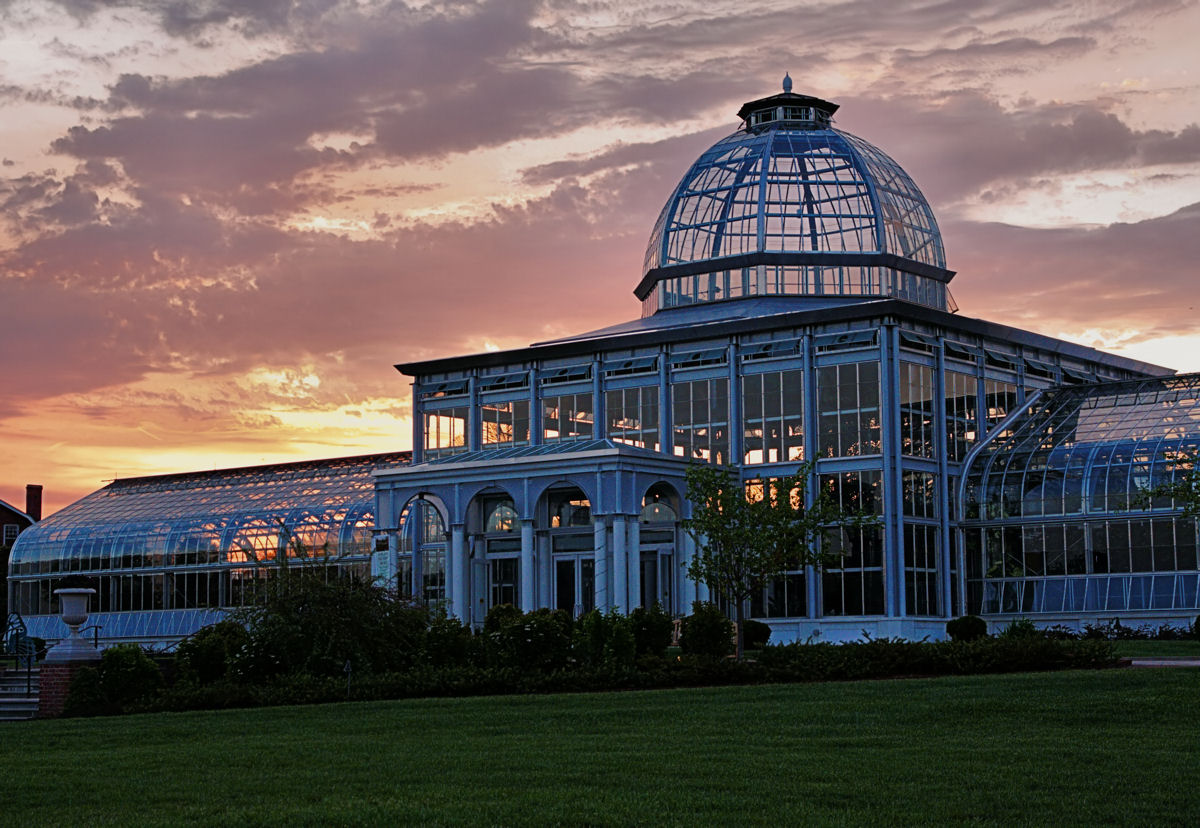
Evening View of the Conservatory

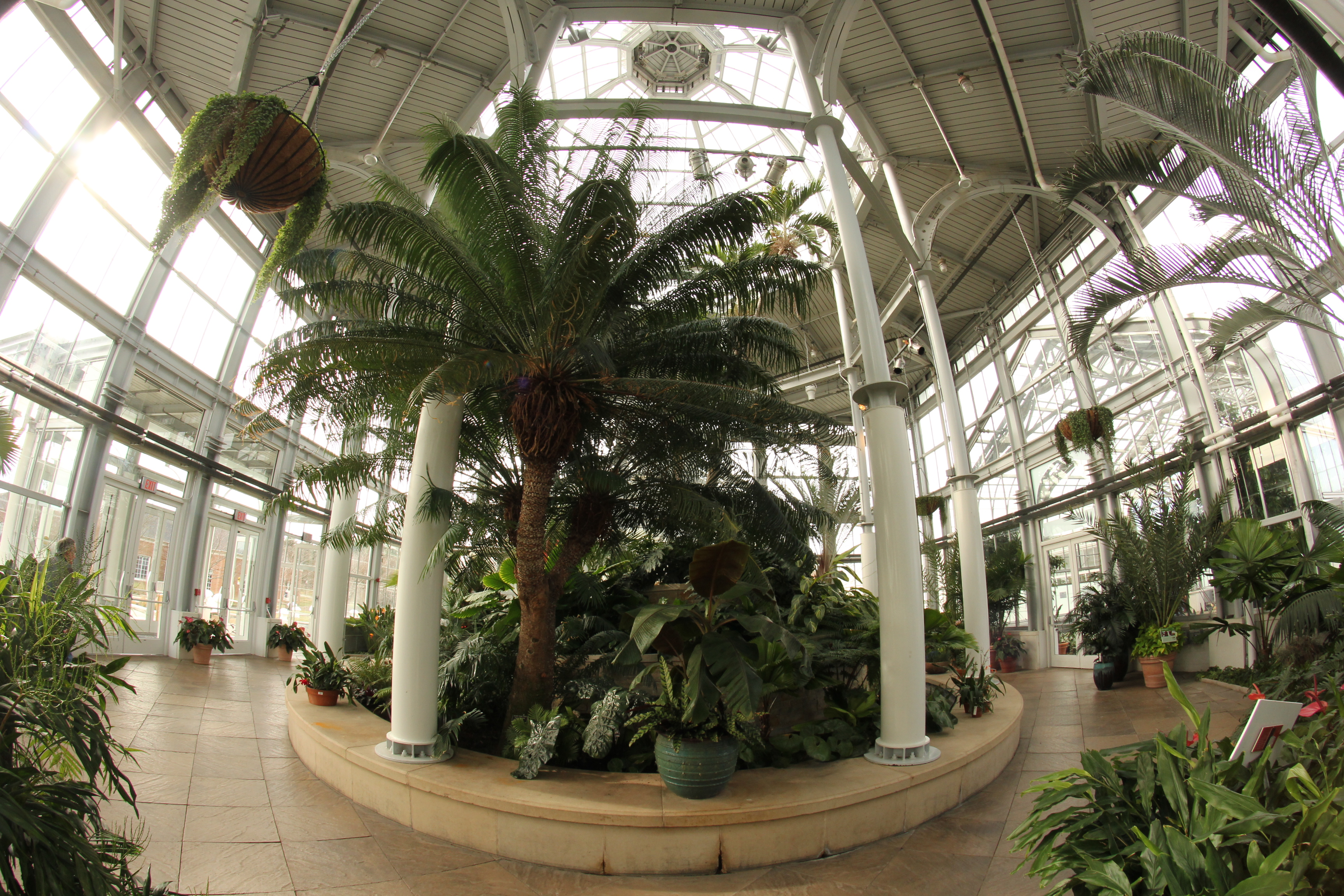
Inside part of the conservatory.

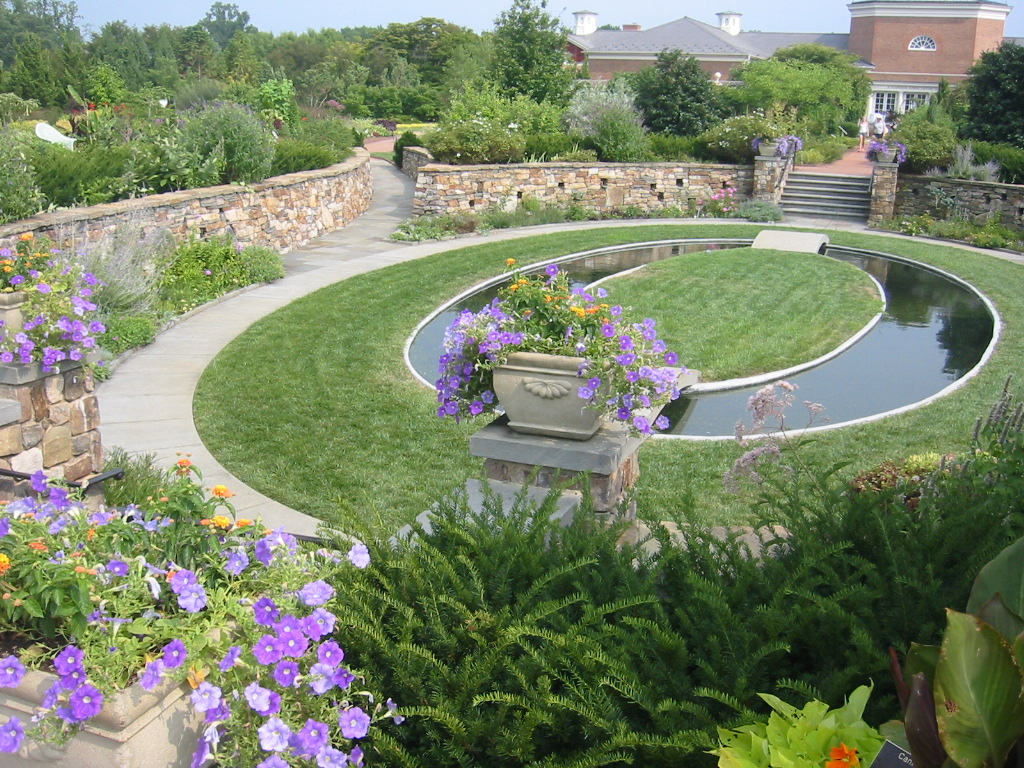
Sunken Garden

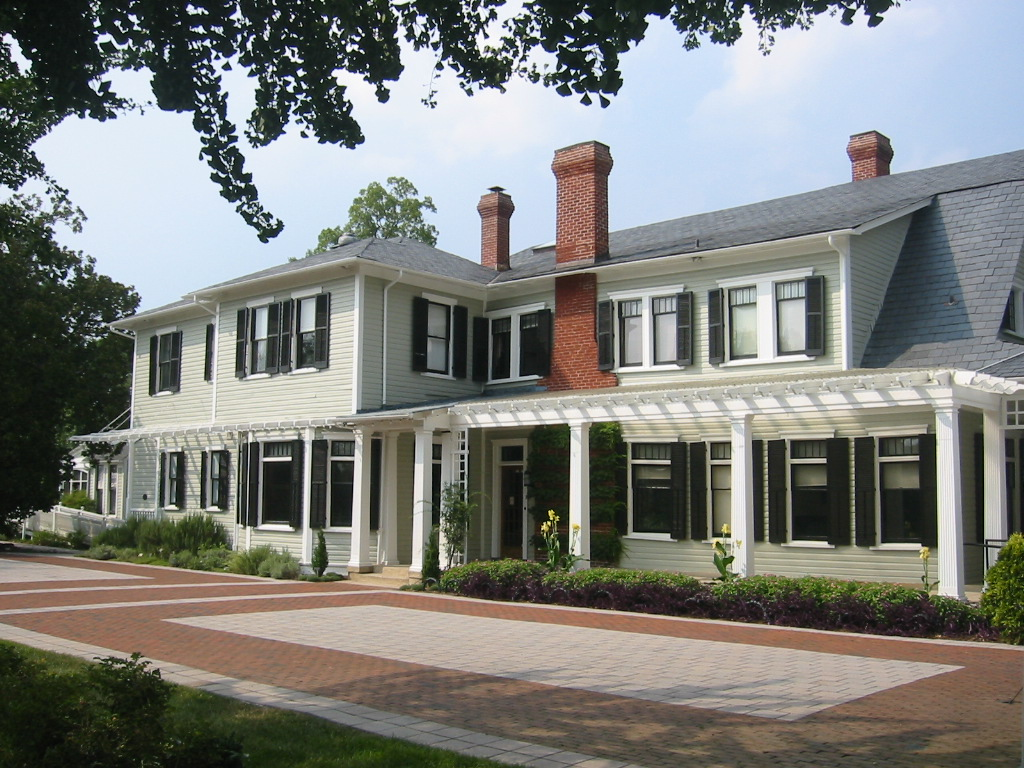
Bloemendaal House

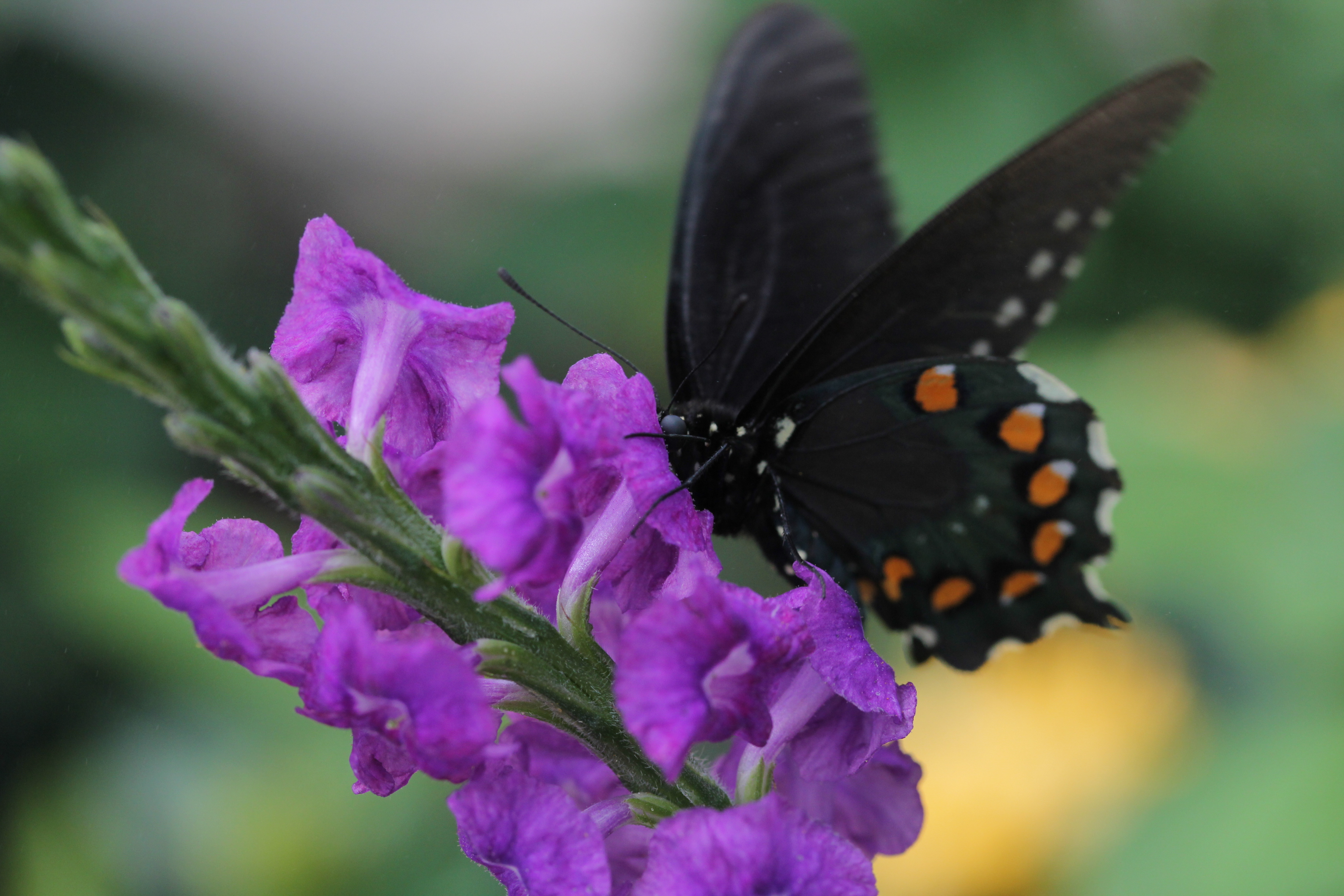
A butterfly event.

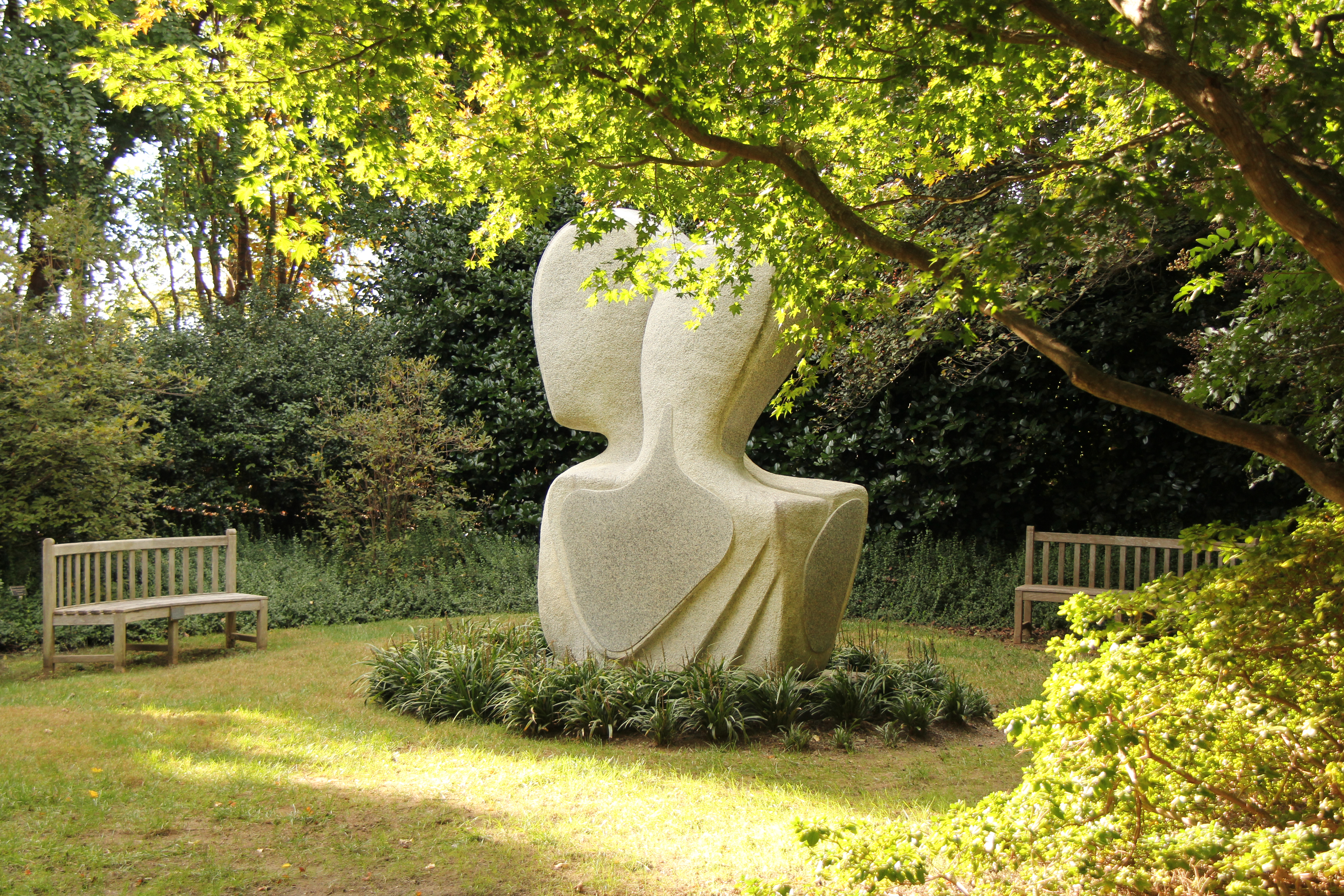
Artwork along a trail.

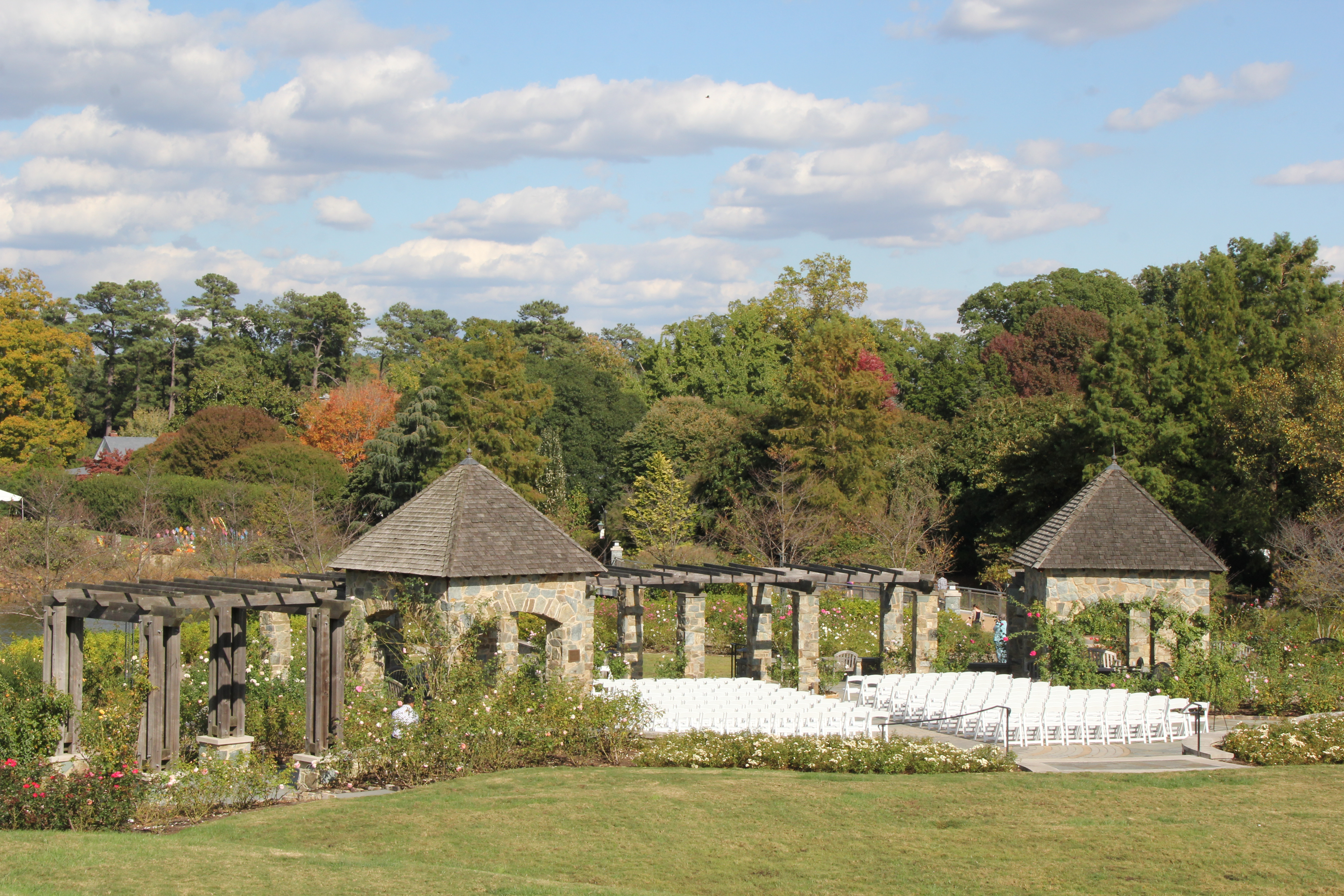
Outdoor event area.

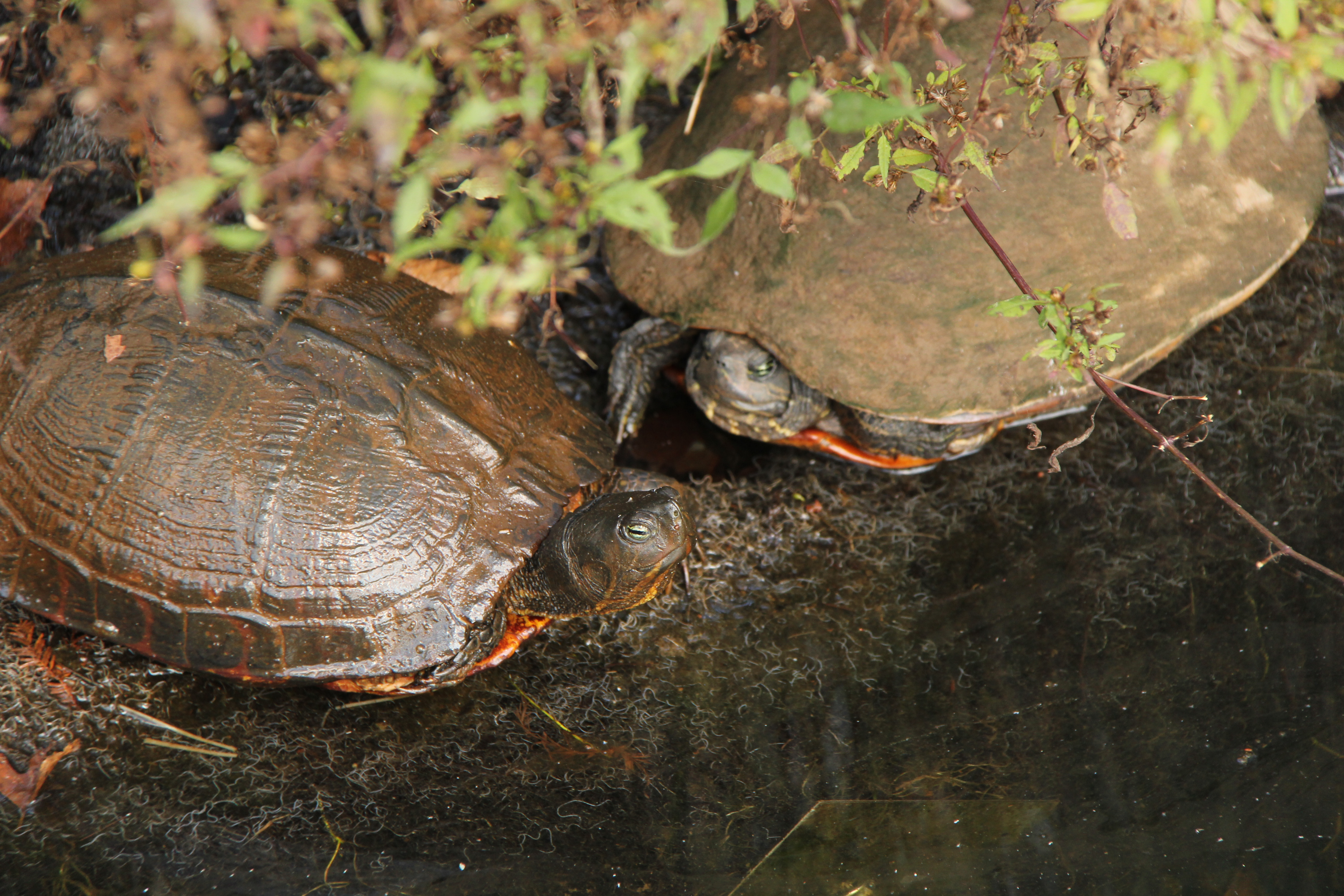
Turtles in a garden area.

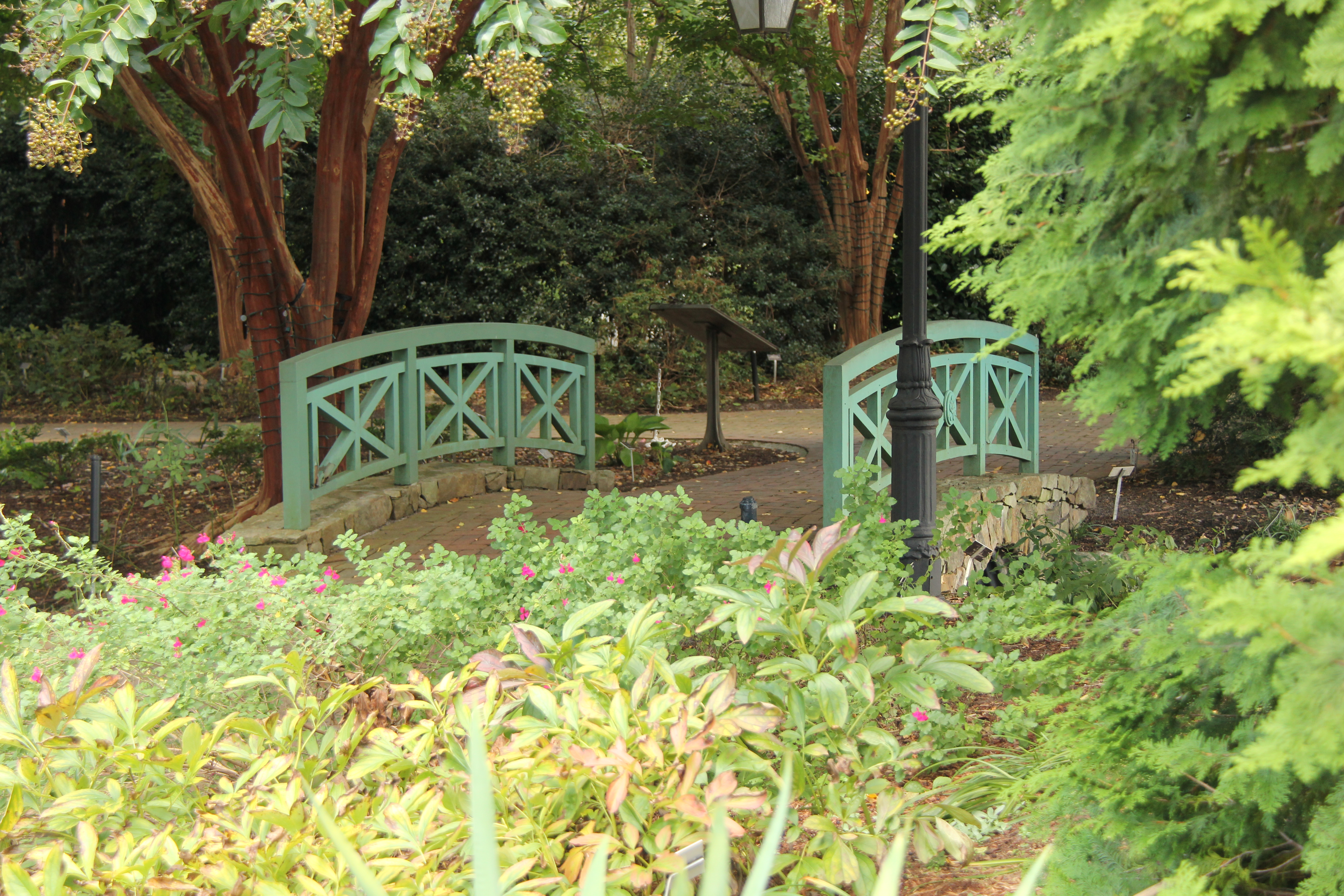
Bridge along a nature trail.

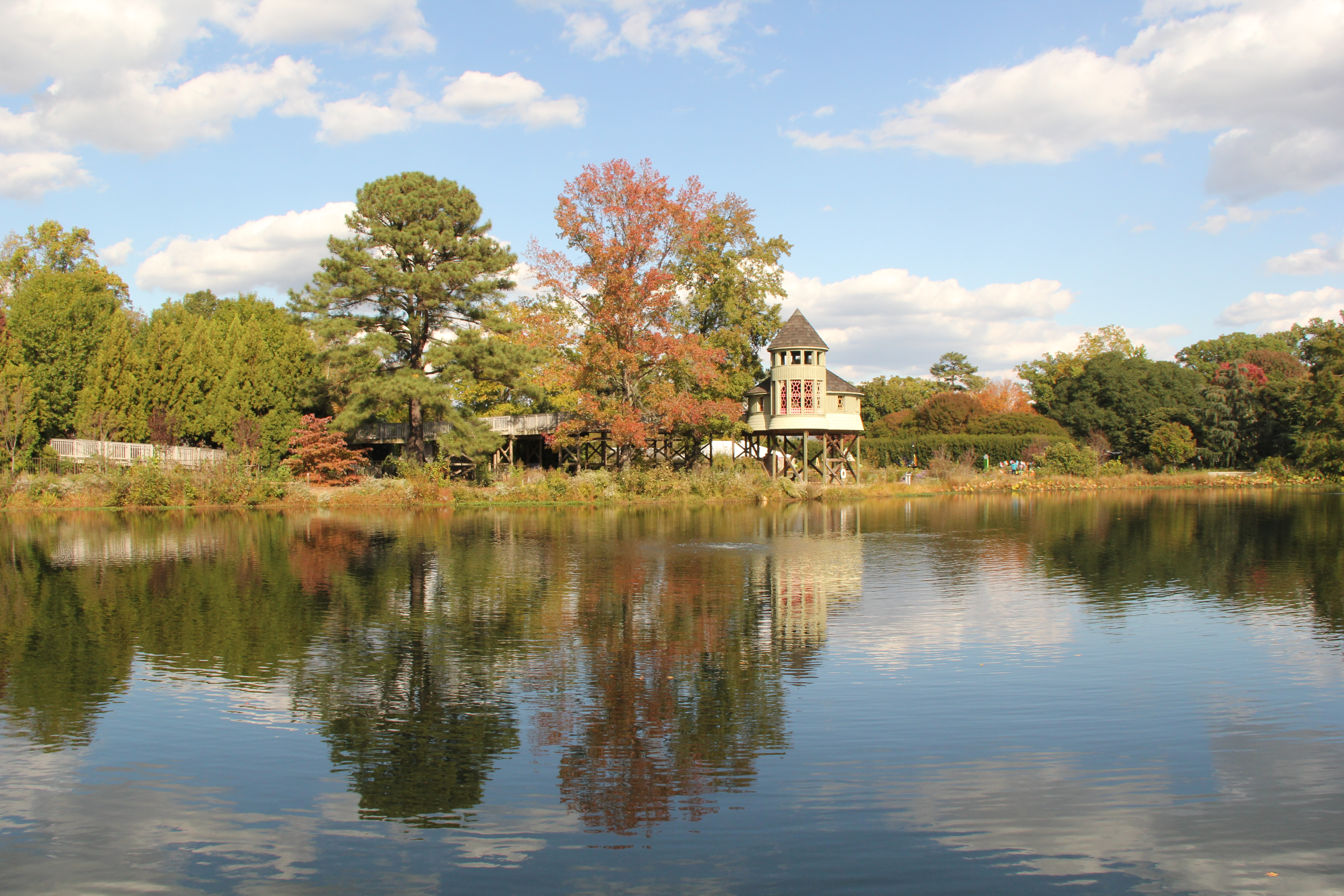
Lake area.

== See also ==
- List of botanical gardens in the United States
- Lewis Ginter
