= Laburnum Avenue =

- Maintained by: Henrico County, City of Richmond, and VDOT
- Length: 14.50 mi (23.34 km); The portion of SR 197 that follows Laburnum Avenue has a length of 1.33 miles (2.14 km).
- West end: SR 895 near Varina
- Major junctions: SR 5 near Varina; US 60 near Montrose; I-64 near Montrose; SR 33 near Highland Springs; US 360 in East Highland Park; US 1 / US 301 in Richmond; SR 161 in Richmond; SR 197 in Richmond
- East end: I-64 / I-195 in Richmond

Laburnum Avenue is a C-shaped highway in Henrico County and the city of Richmond in the U.S. state of Virginia. The highway extends 14.50 miles (23.34 km) from Virginia State Route 895 (SR 895) near Varina southeast of Richmond to Interstate 195 (I-195) on the North Side of the city of Richmond. Laburnum Avenue is a four-lane divided highway that connects the city's inner suburbs in eastern Henrico County. The highway also serves as a major east–west street in Richmond, on part of which the highway forms part of SR 197. Laburnum Avenue intersects all of the radial highways on the east side of Richmond, including SR 5, U.S. Route 60 (US 60), I-64, SR 33, US 360, and US 1 and US 301.

== Route description ==
Laburnum Avenue begins at a trumpet interchange with SR 895 (Pocahontas Parkway) near Varina in southern Henrico County. The trumpet interchange, which is east of SR 895's mainline toll plaza, includes toll gantries on the ramps from southbound Laburnum Avenue to eastbound SR 895 and from westbound SR 895 to Laburnum Avenue. The highway heads north as a four-lane divided highway and intersects South Laburnum Avenue, which leads to Burning Tree Road and eventually Osborne Turnpike, then curves northeast and intersects SR 5 (New Market Road). Laburnum Avenue parallels Cornelius Creek northeast, passing to the south of Varina High School. The highway curves northward beyond its intersection with Darbytown Road. Laburnum Avenue expands to six lanes, crosses over CSX's Peninsula Subdivision rail line, and intersects Charles City Road west of Richmond International Airport.

Laburnum Avenue continues north with four lanes along the eastern edge of the unincorporated area of Montrose. The highway intersects US 60 (Williamsburg Road), starts veering northwestward, and temporarily expands to six lanes ahead of its five-ramp partial cloverleaf interchange with I-64. Laburnum Avenue has an at-grade crossing of Norfolk Southern Railway's Richmond District rail line and intersects SR 33 (Nine Mile Road) west of Highland Springs and east of the historic home Beth Elon. The highway heads north, intersecting Creighton Road, then curves west and intersects US 360 (Mechanicsville Turnpike) within East Highland Park. Laburnum Avenue crosses over CSX's Piedmont Subdivision and passes along the southern edge of Richmond Raceway between Carolina Avenue and Richmond Henrico Turnpike.

Laburnum Avenue continues west into the city of Richmond. The four-lane boulevard intersects US 1 and US 301 (Chamberlayne Avenue) within the Ginter Park Historic District. This intersection serves as the northern terminus of SR 197, which follows Laburnum Avenue westward. Laburnum Avenue passes along the northern edge of the Laburnum Park Historic District between Brook Road and SR 161 (Hermitage Avenue); the intersection with SR 161 featured a statue of Confederate General A.P. Hill until it was removed in 2022. The boulevard issues a ramp to westbound I-64 before it passes under I-64 and I-95 (Richmond Petersburg Turnpike) south of the complex interchange of those Interstates with I-195 south of Bryan Park. SR 197 splits south onto Saunders Avenue between the mainline Interstates and I-195, with which Laburnum Avenue has a three-quarter diamond interchange. The interchange includes a ramp from Laburnum Avenue to southbound I-195 and ramps to Laburnum Avenue from northbound I-195 and eastbound I-64. The interchange serves as Laburnum Avenue's northern terminus; the highway ends at an entrance to CSX's Acca Yard.

Laburnum Avenue is maintained by the Virginia Department of Transportation between SR 895 and SR 5. The remainder of the highway is maintained by Henrico County and the city of Richmond within the respective jurisdictions. Laburnum Avenue is a part of the main National Highway System for its entire length.

== Major intersections ==
County	Location	mi	km	Destinations	Notes
Henrico	Varina	0.00	0.00	SR 895 (Pocahontas Parkway) to I-95 / I-295 / SR 150	Southern terminus of Laburnum Avenue
Henrico	Varina	0.54	0.87	SR 5 (New Market Road) – Richmond, Williamsburg	
Henrico	Montrose	4.89	7.87	US 60 (Williamsburg Road)	
Henrico	Montrose	6.00	9.66	I-64 – Richmond, Norfolk	I-64 exit 195
Henrico	Highland Springs	7.08	11.39	SR 33 (Nine Mile Road)	
Henrico	East Highland Park	10.00	16.09	US 360 (Mechanicsville Turnpike)	
Henrico	East Highland Park	10.40	16.74	Austin Avenue	Entrance to Glen Lea Elementary School
City of Richmond		13.00	20.92	US 1 / US 301 (Chamberlayne Avenue)	Eastern terminus of SR 197
City of Richmond		13.84	22.27	SR 161 (Hermitage Road)	
City of Richmond		14.26	22.95	I-64 west – Charlottesville	Entrance to westbound I-64 only
City of Richmond		14.33	23.06	SR 197 west (Saunders Avenue)	SR 197 turns south onto Saunders Avenue
City of Richmond		14.50	23.34	I-195 south – Downtown Richmond	Northern terminus of Laburnum Avenue; entrance ramp to southbound I-195 and exit ramps from eastbound I-64 (exit 187) and northbound I-195
1.000 mi = 1.609 km; 1.000 km = 0.621 mi
