= Sherwood Park (Richmond, Virginia) =

Coordinates: 37.575°N 77.455°W

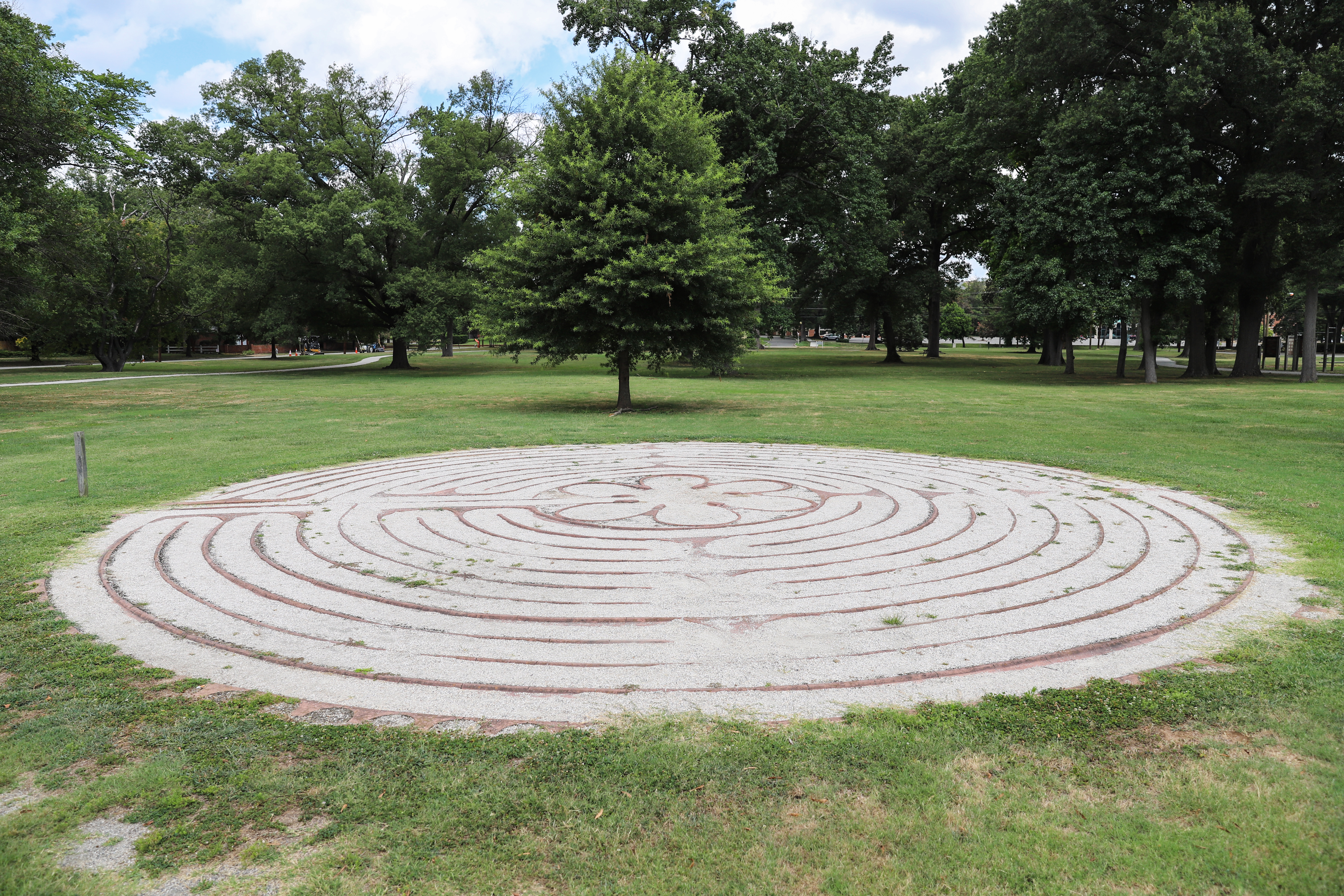
Meditation labyrinth inside the walking track in Sherwood Park

Sherwood Park is one of several historical neighborhoods that comprise the area known as Northside in the city of Richmond, Virginia.

Among the streetcar suburbs commissioned in 1891 by local businessman Lewis Ginter, Sherwood Park's original design was laid out in 1892 by the firm of acclaimed landscape architect Frederick Law Olmsted. Due to economic, social, and political factors during Ginter's lifetime, Olmsted's elegant design of gently curved streets was never realized. Development of modern Sherwood Park accelerated during the late 1920s and continued through 1940–1950. Today the community has evolved into a diverse neighborhood of tree lined streets, bike lanes, a variety of architectural styles and sidewalks throughout.

== Origins of the neighborhood ==
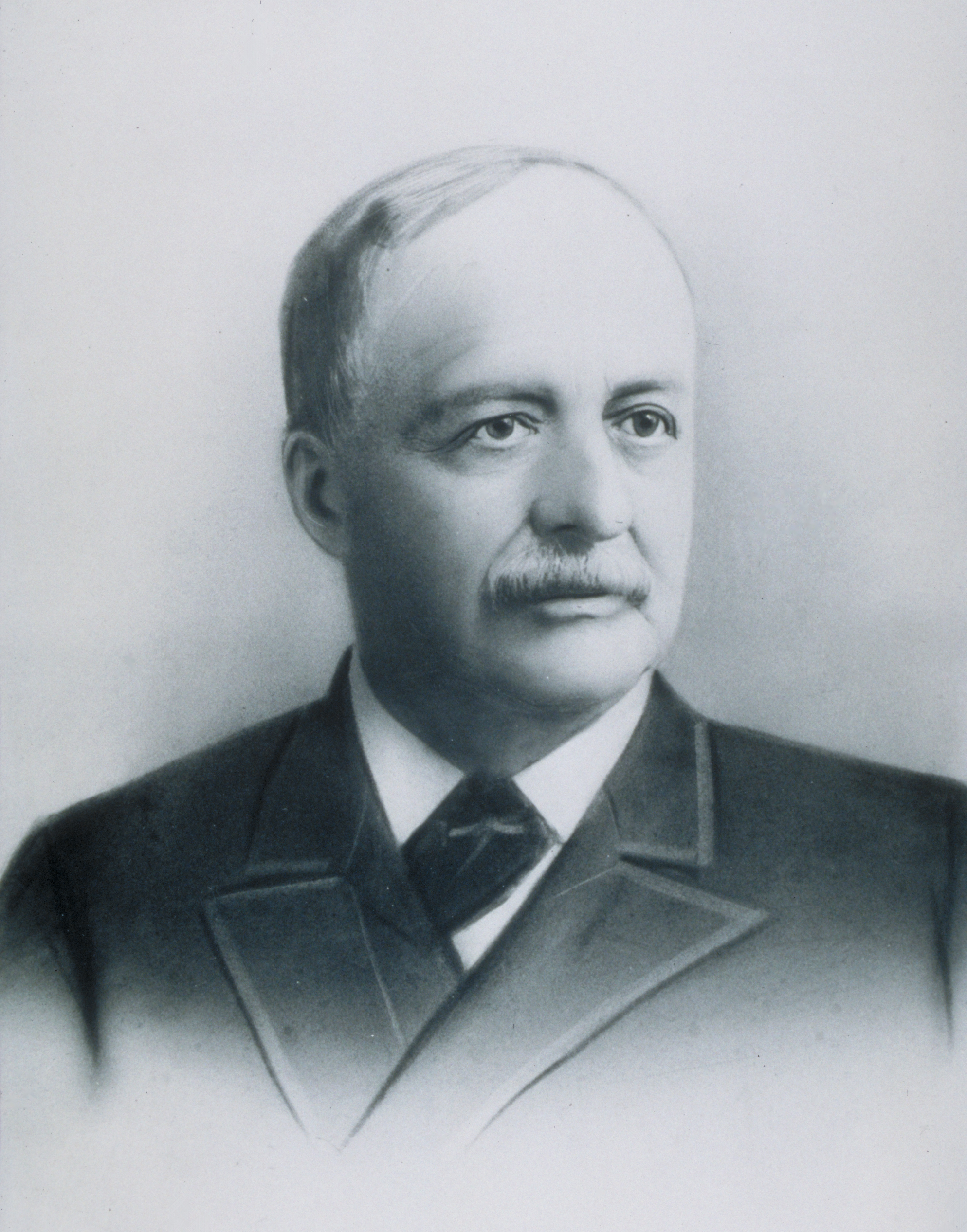
Lewis Ginter, Richmond Financier, Real Estate Developer and Philanthropist

Following the Civil War, Lewis Ginter, one of the city's wealthiest residents, initiated several suburban beautification and development projects. He created the Sherwood Land Company in 1891 to promote his various projects. The name Sherwood was taken from an old estate along Brook Turnpike dating from the early 1800s that belong to a New York banker whom Ginter had partnered with after the war. Ginter purchased the Sherwood estate and incorporated it into the Sherwood Park development. Such early suburban street-car communities were created so that business men in downtown Richmond could retreat from the city to the countryside. The first electric street car in the city was installed in 1888. Other developments included Ginter Park, Laburnum Park (developed by the family of Joseph Bryan), and Bellevue (developed by John Pope, Ginter's younger associate and friend). As a respected philanthropist, Ginter notably donated land for the relocation of Union Theological Seminary from Farmville VA to Richmond on land adjacent to the future Sherwood Park.

By the time Ginter had initiated these developments, Frederick Law Olmsted Sr. had established himself as the preeminent landscape architect in the nation. Among Olmsted's notable and lasting achievements was the creation of the gardens at George W. Vanderbilt's massive Biltmore estate in Asheville NC. The Biltmore project led Olmsted to Richmond VA to procure trees, shrubs, and vines at the Franklin Davis & Co. nursery in Richmond. It was there on one of their regular forays through Richmond to Biltmore that an associate of Ginter in the Sherwood Land Company, Edward H. Bissell, met Olmsted in 1888. By then Olmsted was already an enthusiastic proponent of the newly developing suburbs throughout the country. The Sherwood Land Company engaged Olmstead's firm to assist in the development of "Brook Turnpike", now Brook Rd., which was a wide parkway that connected downtown to Ginter's suburban Northside properties. This initial collaboration between their respective firms established the relationship between Olmsted and Ginter. John Charles Olmsted, Olmsted's nephew, took the lead on the project because of Olmsted's preoccupation with the World's Columbian Exposition and the Biltmore Estate.

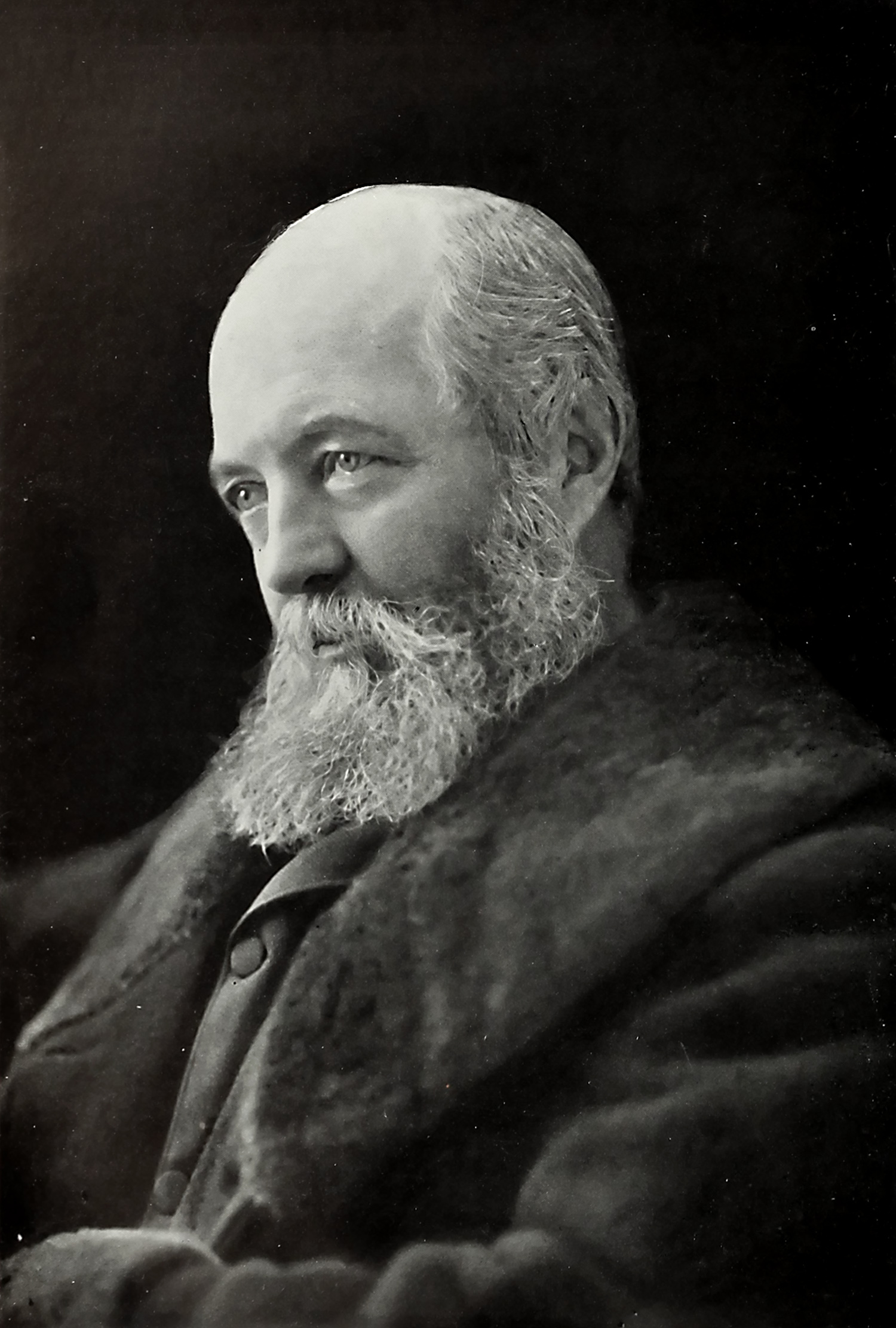
Frederick Law Olmsted Sr., American landscape architect

By 1891, the Sherwood Park development was on Olmsted's firm's design docket. The earliest plans included a broad tree-lined parkway with irregular curves called Brookland Parkway that even today follows the plans set out in the firm's preliminary drawings. As originally conceived, the parkway would be large enough to accommodate a street-car line in the central median that would not disturb the nearby horse-drawn carriage traffic. The street-cars however were never implemented. The development lots along the development's curving roads varied in size with the largest sites reserved to face Brookland Parkway. There were smaller lots located on the western edge along Hermitage Ave. These smaller lots with easy access to the electric streetcars were part of Olmsted's efforts for people to provide people with modest incomes access to rural conditions. Its final design, with its winding roads, numerous public grounds, access to public transportation, secluded yards and varying lot sizes embodied many of Olmsted's suburban design principles as had been applied to other developments in other states.

A number of factors would eventually undermine the creation of Sherwood Park as Olmsted's firm envisioned. The city of Richmond was a racially segregated city and Ginter insisted on a large surrounding fence to keep the large nearby black population out. Olmsted's firm redrew the borders so that a gated community could be built to wall off the site from its unwelcome neighbors. An engineer was hired in 1892 who did not appreciate the artistry of Olmsted's design and the streets were laid out in a more grid-like pattern rather than the more difficult to construct and less economical curves in the original design. Ginter was concerned that as much as 33% of the land was devoted to public use and therefore not salable. The number of large lots were reduced, the smallest lots were eliminated and a large public area in the southwest corner was removed. Apparently Ginter approved these changes and as a consequence there is no evidence of further cooperation between the Sherwood Land Company and Olmsted's firm after 1893. Ginter's health was failing and he appeared to have greater interest in the development of nearby Ginter Park. Moreover, it appeared that Ginter Park was more favored by wealthy whites moving into the suburbs who wanted to avoid the black community in nearby Douglas Court (the current site of Virginia Union University). The financial panic of 1893 contributed to the slow down of the project, and Ginter died in 1897.

Development of Sherwood Park remained slow through 1917 while work progressed more rapidly in nearby Ginter Park. The first lot sales in Ginter Place occurred in 1898, more than twenty years before any building in Sherwood Park. Development in Sherwood Park did not begin in earnest until 1926, and only in 1929 was the first model home at 3320 Loxley Road offered for sale. Progress was further hindered by the Great Depression but new construction began during the period from 1930 to 1940. In the 1950s, further changes occurred with the construction of the Richmond–Petersburg Turnpike which cut off the southwest corner of the development, an area the Olmsted firm originally planned as a common area with a clubhouse and tennis courts. Little remains in modern Sherwood Park resembling Olmsted's original design. The most notable similarity is the gently curving Brookland Parkway with its luscious crepe myrtle tree borders that dazzle commuters during the summer months.

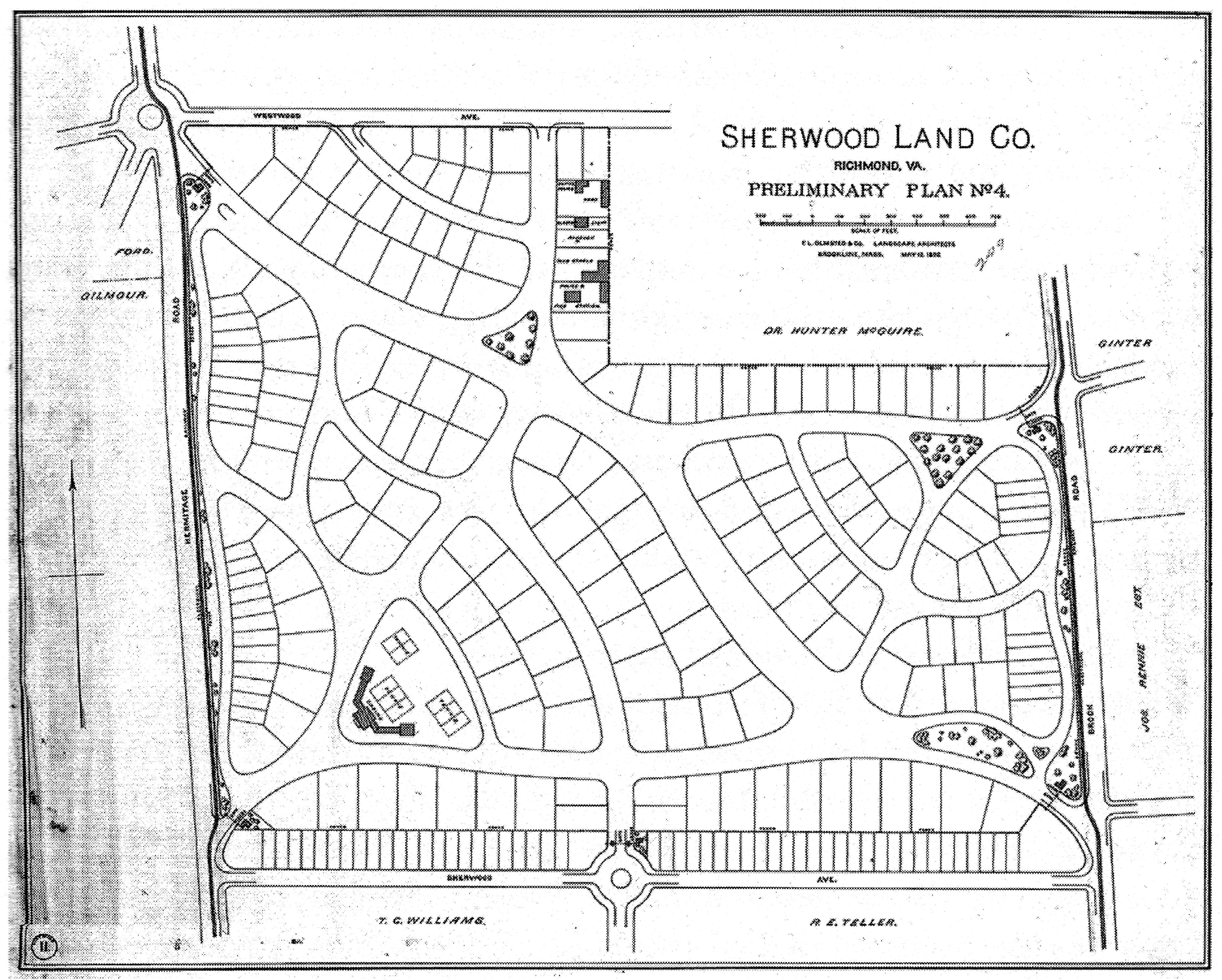
Landscape drawing of Frederick L. Olmsted firm's 1892 plan for Sherwood Park, Richmond VA

== Westwood Tract ==
=== History ===
In 1887, Dr. Hunter Holmes McGuire acquired a tract of land in the northeastern corner of modern Sherwood Park for his private country retreat. McGuire was a Confederate patriot, personal physician to Stonewall Jackson, a friend and business partner of Lewis Ginter, and one of the founders of the Medical College of Virginia. He served on the board of directors of Ginter's Sherwood Land Company. McGuire updated and expanded an existing frame and stucco house known as "Westwood" located on the site since the 1790s that later became known as the "McGuire Cottage".

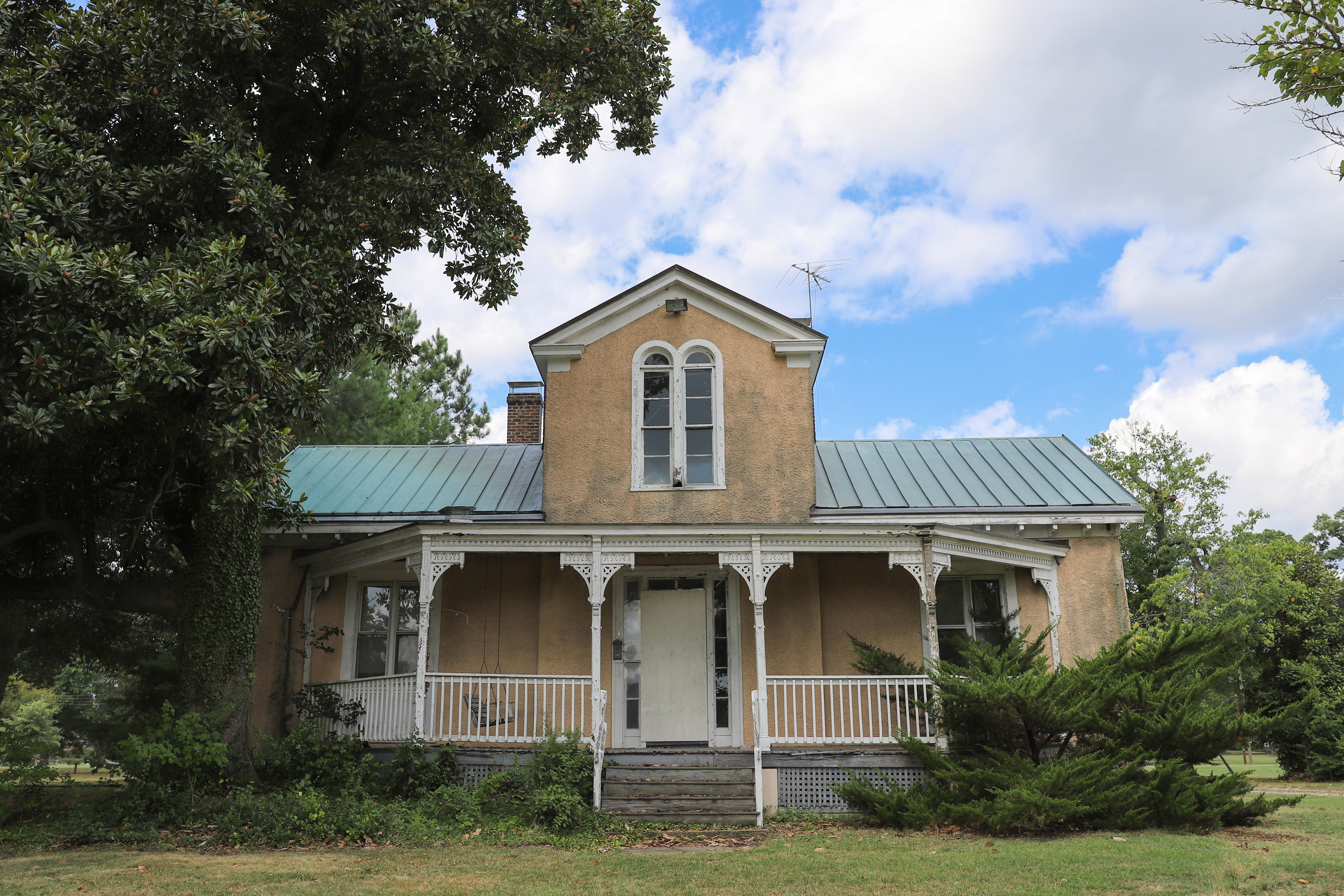
McGuire Cottage in 2017

McGuire purchased Westwood in March 1887, then a slightly larger tract in Henrico County, from William Pleasants for $13,500. The land purchased by McGuire had previously been owned by Captain Charles Meriwether, a Union Army Captain and Mexican War Veteran, who sold the parcel to Pleasants on July 21, 1862. By 1890, Ginter had begun plans for a new development to be called Sherwood Park and Westwood was incorporated into the original plan developed by the Sherwood Land Company. Following the death of McGuire in 1900, Union Theological Seminary acquired the cottage and adjoining property for future development. Three historic neighborhoods, Ginter Park, Laburnum Park, and Sherwood Park adjoin the 34-acre (14 ha) park-like tract that lies across the intersection of Brook Rd. and Westwood Ave. from the seminary complex. The historic McGuire Cottage, two abandoned dormitory complexes, and a few other buildings were located within the tract. Grassy lawns, recreational features such as athletic fields and tennis courts, many mature trees, a community walking track, and a meditation labyrinth added to the vibrance and vitality of the neighborhood and to the Seminary.

=== Controversy ===
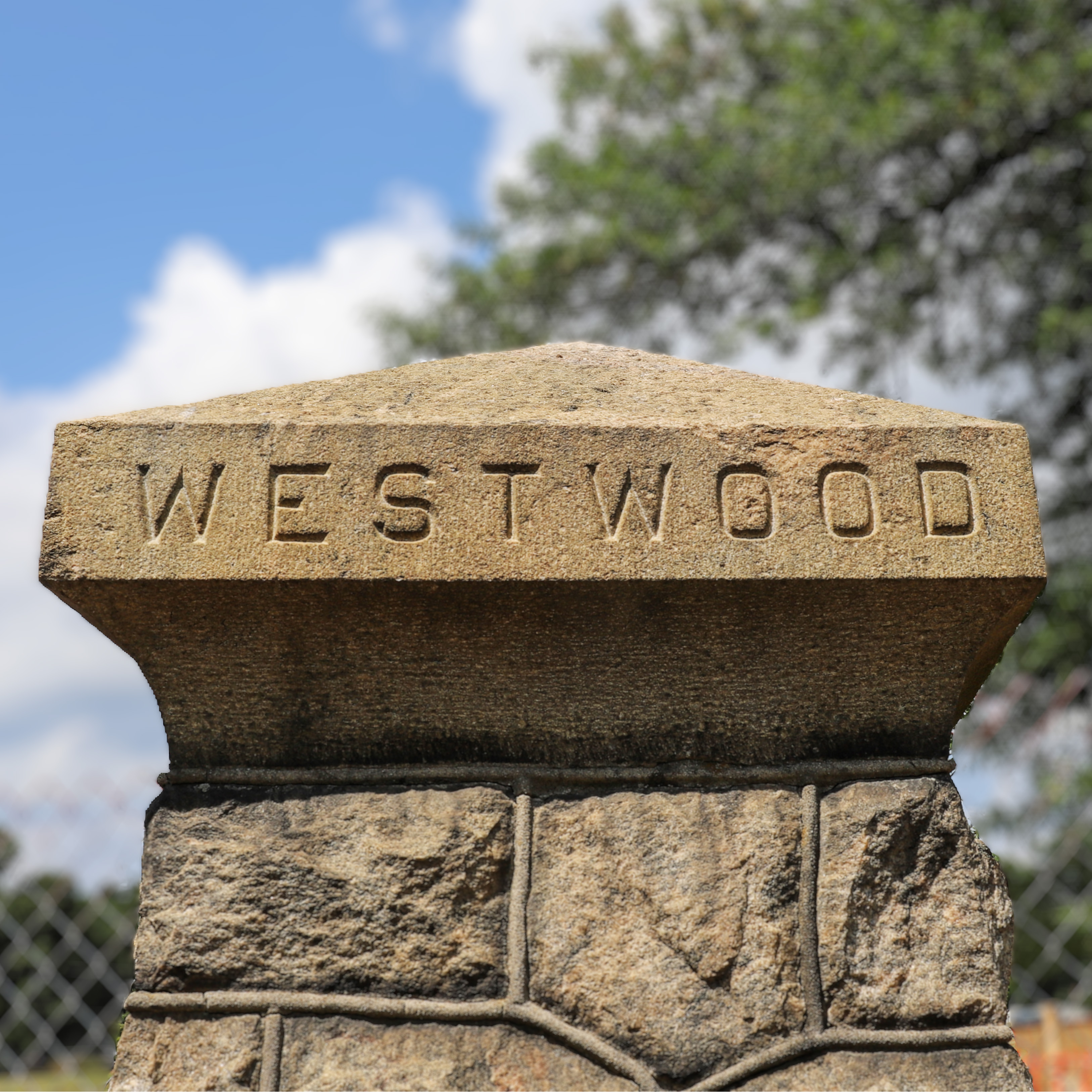
Westwood marker on Brook Rd.

Following a significant decline in its endowment fund from 1997 to 2009, the Seminary in 2009 began a restructuring plan that involved changing its name to “Union Presbyterian Seminary”, cuts in personnel, property and programs, and initiation of a large capital campaign. The western side of the Seminary campus was sold in 1997 to Baptist Theological Seminary Richmond and was subsequently acquired by Veritas School in 2013. In 2014, the Seminary announced a plan to develop the entire Westwood tract with single family housing and rental units. A zoning ordinance passed for the Westwood tract in 1953 by the Richmond City Council gave permission to the Seminary to build multifamily dwellings on the site (for dormitories), according to the standards of the time. While the neighboring communities had enjoyed a cordial relationship with the Seminary since their mutual inception, the residents reacted swiftly to the pending disruption of the historic character of the neighborhood, the prospect of increased urbanization and congestion surrounding the development, and the loss of recreational facilities that were already scarce in the Northside region. Numerous formal community engagement meetings, individual meetings, and city council hearings were held with the local residents. The Seminary decided to limit its original plans by construction of a 300-unit apartment complex on just 15 acres (6.1 ha) on the eastern section of the site along Brook Rd and adjacent to Ginter Park. Nevertheless, the new plan called for inserting more households onto one block of Brook Road than had been built over a century in all of Sherwood Park, which proved to be unacceptable to the residents who claimed that the revised plan packed in too many dwelling units, would contribute to traffic congestion, and failed to take account of the historic patterns of the surrounding blocks.

In April 2017, the president of the Seminary reiterated the Seminary's intention to revive a decades-old plan to develop the tract for the expansion of the Seminary. The plan called for the construction of luxury apartments that would in part provide student housing with the remaining part becoming public housing that would help to subsidize the housing for the Seminary students. The Seminary's stated position was that the development could have a positive effect on the community and provide housing alternatives to a younger generation of families. The final plan called for the remaining 19 acres (7.7 ha) to remain as community land, a portion of which was reserved for a charitable urban farm. The existing walking track used by a variety of people would be modified but preserved. Sherwood Park and other local residents were not reassured and, despite a last minute court suit and appeals by residents to the mayor and local officials, construction began on the site in the summer of 2017.

In December, 2020, Bristol Development Group sold the newly constructed 301-unit Canopy at Ginter Park apartments for $83.75 million to Capital Square, a Richmond-based real-estate development firm. Union Presbyterian Seminary demolished the Westwood Cottage in January 2021. The decision to demolish the structure coincided with a racial reckoning across the country following the murder of George Floyd and demonstrations protesting police brutality. Some preservationists who opposed its demolition questioned the sincerity of the seminary's explanation for razing the home, noting that its leaders had considered the option years ago.

=== Shalom Farms ===
In 2017, Shalom Farms broke ground on a five acre farm located in the Westwood Tract of Sherwood Park on property owned by Union Presbyterian Seminary. Shalom Farms is a nonprofit organization working to build healthy communities by growing and sharing healthy food. The food produced by their farms is distributed through a local network of programs and partnerships in communities where access to healthy food is limited. The farm is just minutes from the communities they serve and is the largest urban farm in the region. With two acres in production, the farm harvests approximately 100,000 servings of produce a year. The Sherwood Park farm is the organization’s second farm after their primary in location Powhatan county. The site increases the accessibility of education and volunteer opportunities, and is a central location for distribution and on-farm partnerships in the Richmond area.

=== Yaupon Place ===
Yaupon Place is a park and public outreach ministry of Union Presbyterian Seminary. It was developed in 2022 on the site of the preexisting walking track on seminary property in the Westwood tract inside Sherwood Park. The seminary's vision for the park is to engage both the seminary community and its diverse Northside neighbors and community partners. It focuses on community story sharing, outdoor recreation, and eco-spiritual education.

=== The Labyrinth ===
The design of the Innerwork Center Labyrinth

The Innerwork Center (formerly Chrysalis) Labyrinth is located in the Westwood Tract of Sherwood Park inside the Yaupon Place park. It is free and open to all who are seeking a contemplative place to walk, breathe, and reconnect. The design of The Labyrinth is patterned after the one laid prior to 1220 A.D. in the floor of Chartres Cathedral in France. For centuries, labyrinths have been used across cultures as a sacred tool for reflection and renewal. Walking the labyrinth is often seen as a symbol of the spiritual journey, helping us to quiet the noise of daily life, listen inwardly, and return with greater clarity and peace.

== Tom Wolfe ==
Tom Wolfe (March 2, 1930 – May 14, 2018) was a famous American writer and journalist. He was author of The Electric Kool-Aid Acid Test, The Right Stuff, and The Bonfire of the Vanities among other popular works. Wolfe was born in Richmond and raised in a house on Gloucester Rd. in Sherwood Park. In 1991, Wolf wrote a short but affecting childhood memoir of his life in Sherwood Park in the early days of the development in a letter to the current resident of the Wolfe home.

I think our house was one of the first five or ten along Gloucester and Loxley. This was a development called Sherwood Park. I don't know whether the neighborhood has hung on to that name or not. In any case, no neighborhood ever had a lovelier group of people. In the twenty-five years we lived there we never had a bad neighbor. ... We had a coal-burning furnace. The coal bin was in the southeast corner of the cellar. We also had an old-fashioned ice box. A couple of times a week the ice man brought an enormous block of ice which he carried on a rubber mantle that went across his back. He got a grip on the ice with a huge pair of tongs. The arrival of our first electric refrigerator---in the late 30s, I suppose---was quite an event.

— Tom Wolfe, https://www.architecturaldigest.com/story/tom-wolfes-sweet-memories-of-his-childhood-home-will-make-you-cry
