= Virginia State Route 197 =

State highway in Virginia, US

State Route 197

Route information
- Maintained by VDOT
- Length: 3.60 mi (5.79 km)
- Existed: 1962–present

Major junctions
- West end: SR 147 in Richmond
- US 33 / US 250 in Richmond
- East end: US 1 / US 301 in Richmond

Location
- Country: United States
- State: Virginia
- Counties: City of Richmond, Henrico

Highway system
- Virginia Routes; Interstate; US; Primary; Secondary; Byways; History; HOT lanes
← SR 196	→ SR 198

State Route 197 (SR 197) is a primary state highway in the U.S. state of Virginia. The state highway runs 3.60 miles (5.79 km) from SR 147 in Richmond east to U.S. Route 1 (US 1) and US 301 in Richmond.

== Route description ==
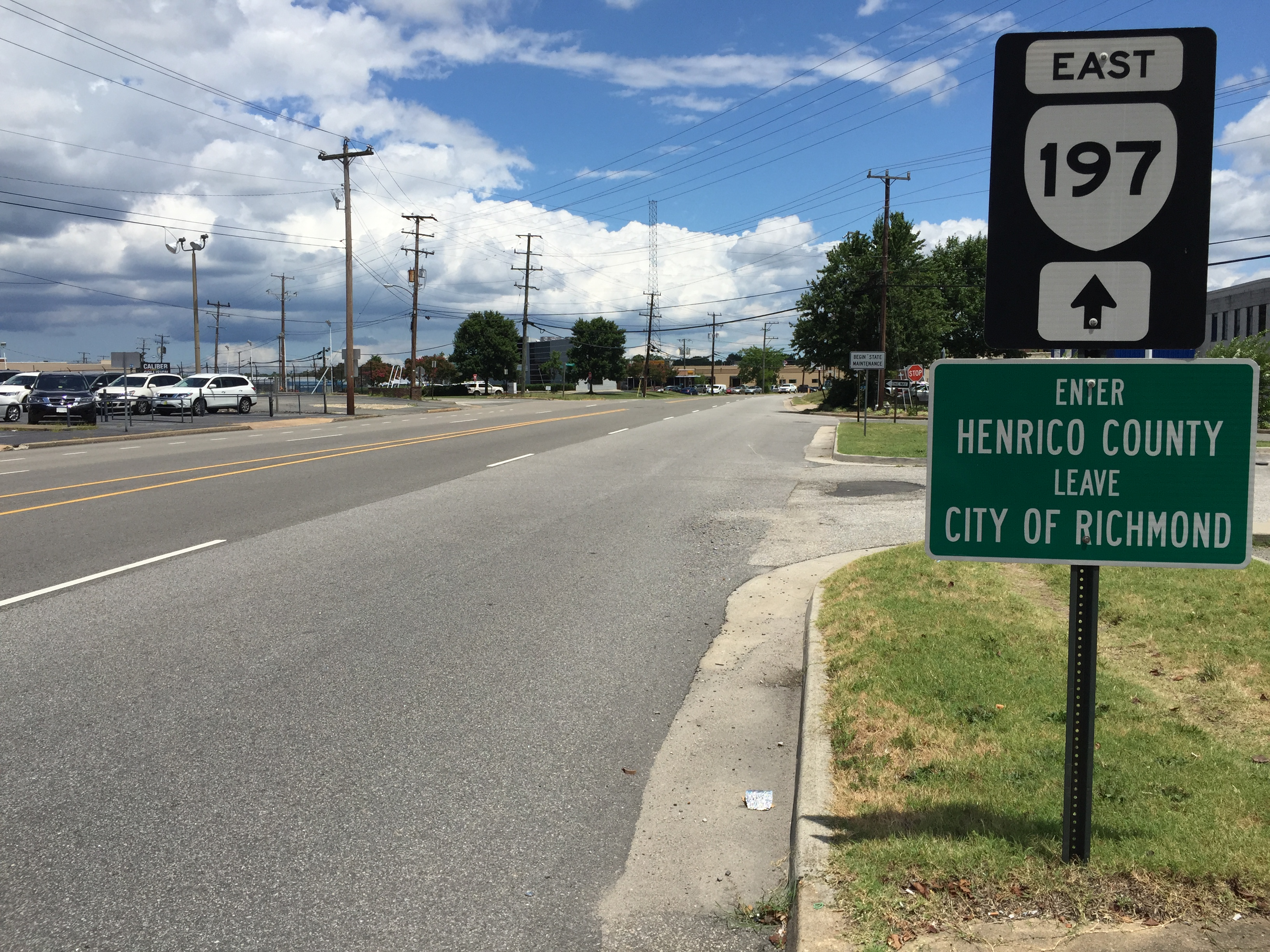
View east along SR 197 entering Henrico County from Richmond past the US 33/US 250 intersection

SR 197 begins at an intersection with SR 147 (Cary Street) in the Windsor Farms neighborhood of Richmond. The state highway heads northeast on Malvern Avenue, a four-lane undivided street that passes through a residential area and intersects SR 6 (Patterson Avenue) and Monument Avenue. North of Broad Street, which carries US 33 and US 250, SR 197 enters an industrial area and leaves the city of Richmond. The state highway follows Westwood Avenue through Henrico County. SR 197 expands to a divided highway as it passes under Interstate 195 (I-195, Beltline Expressway) with no access, then crosses over CSX's RF&P Subdivision. North of the railroad tracks, Westwood Avenue splits to the east at a partial trumpet interchange; there is no direct access from westbound Westwood Avenue to eastbound SR 197 or from westbound SR 197 to eastbound Westwood Avenue. SR 197 continues as Saunders Avenue, which re-enters the city of Richmond just north of the Westwood Avenue interchange and has a short split section just south of its junction with Laburnum Avenue.

SR 197 continues east along four-lane divided Laburnum Avenue, which also heads west as an unnumbered street a short distance to a partial diamond interchange with I-195 just south of its junction with I-64 and I-95 (Richmond–Petersburg Turnpike). SR 197 passes under the two Interstates just south of their divergence point and passes an entrance to westbound I-64. The state highway continues east through a residential area where it intersects SR 161 (Hermitage Road); in the center of the intersection is a statue of Confederate General A.P. Hill. After intersecting Brook Road, SR 197 reaches its eastern terminus at US 1 and US 301 (Chamberlayne Avenue) in the Ginter Park neighborhood. Laburnum Avenue continues as a partial circumferential highway of Richmond through Henrico County that provides access to Richmond Raceway and East Highland Park and eventually ends at the junction of SR 5 and SR 895.

== Major intersections ==
County	Location	mi	km	Destinations	Notes
City of Richmond		0.00	0.00	SR 147 (Cary Street Road) to SR 195	Western terminus
City of Richmond				SR 6 (Patterson Avenue)	
City of Richmond				Monument Avenue	former SR 418 east
City of Richmond		1.22	1.96	US 33 / US 250 (West Broad Street)	
Henrico	No major junctions				
City of Richmond		1.85	2.98	Westwood Avenue	Interchange; eastbound exit and westbound entrance
City of Richmond		2.27	3.65	West Laburnum Avenue to I-195 south	
City of Richmond				I-64 west	I-64 exit 186
City of Richmond		2.76	4.44	SR 161 (Hermitage Road)	
City of Richmond		3.60	5.79	US 1 / US 301 (Chamberlayne Avenue) to I-95 north	Eastern terminus
1.000 mi = 1.609 km; 1.000 km = 0.621 mi: Incomplete access
