= Mechanicsville Turnpike =

Former toll road in Virginia, US

Mechanicsville Turnpike was a toll road that connected downtown Richmond, Virginia, to the community of Mechanicsville in Hanover County. Today the road carries U.S. Route 360.

== History ==
The Mechanicsville Turnpike Company was established by an act of the Virginia General Assembly in 1816 and was authorized to sell stock and establish tolls to finance the new road. The road was to be located "from the city of Richmond, crossing the Chickahominy river between the meadow and new bridges, until it intersects the swamp road on the north side of the said river." The turnpike was created in response to the petition of local citizens, so the name Mechanicsville may have already been in use at that time. The first mention of the name Mechanicsville in the Richmond Enquirer was in 1817, advertising the Mechanicsville Turnpike Company's effort to build a new road from downtown Richmond.

The initial managers of the Mechanicsville Turnpike Company were John Adams, Samuel P. Parsons, Richard Curd, George Greenbow, and Charles Whitlock in Richmond and Parke Street, Patrick Anderson, Thomas Starke, Thomas Pollard, and Benjamin Oliver Jr. in Hanover County.

The community is not identified in John Wood's 1820 map of Hanover County though it does show the locations of the Polegreen Church, Topotomoy Creek, and Beaverdam Creek. According to local sources, the name "Mechanicsville" came from a wheelwright and blacksmith shop at a crossroads on the Hanover end of the road, one of a dozen or so buildings there before the Civil War.

In 1861, the company was re-incorporated and the General Assembly authorized a loan of up to $10,000 for "the purpose of repairing and improving the turnpike road". In 1866, the road, toll booths, and associated rights were auctioned off and the New Mechanicsville Turnpike Company was established, with their goal of "reconstructing the company's turnpike ... rapidly approaching completion". The causeweay across the Chickahominy River had to be rebuilt; the original was destroyed during the Civil War.

The New Mechanicsville Turnpike Company continued to operate the road until the 1920s, when the Virginia General Assembly authorized the purchase of the road and its integration into the state system of public highways. Public sentiment had turned against turnpike roads, with the Richmond Times-Dispatch writing "Virginia has been a long time working out from under the toll-gate evil".

== Route ==
The original route of Mechanicsville Turnpike started at the intersection of 18th Street and Venable Street in the city of Richmond and connected the city to Henrico and Hanover counties. The section between Venable Street and Fairmount Street has since been renamed Mosby Street.

The current alignment of Mechanicsville Turnpike begins at the intersection of Fairmount Avenue, Littlepage Street, and Mosby Street in Church Hill. It heads generally northeast from there, leaving the city of Richmond and entering Henrico County. It intersects with Laburnum Avenue before heading across the Chickahominy River and its associated swamp, entering Hanover County. It follows US-360 through Hanover County before ending at the Pamunkey River, which also serves as the Hanover–King William county line.
