= Beth Elon =

Historic house in Virginia, United States

- U.S. National Register of Historic Places
- Virginia Landmarks Register
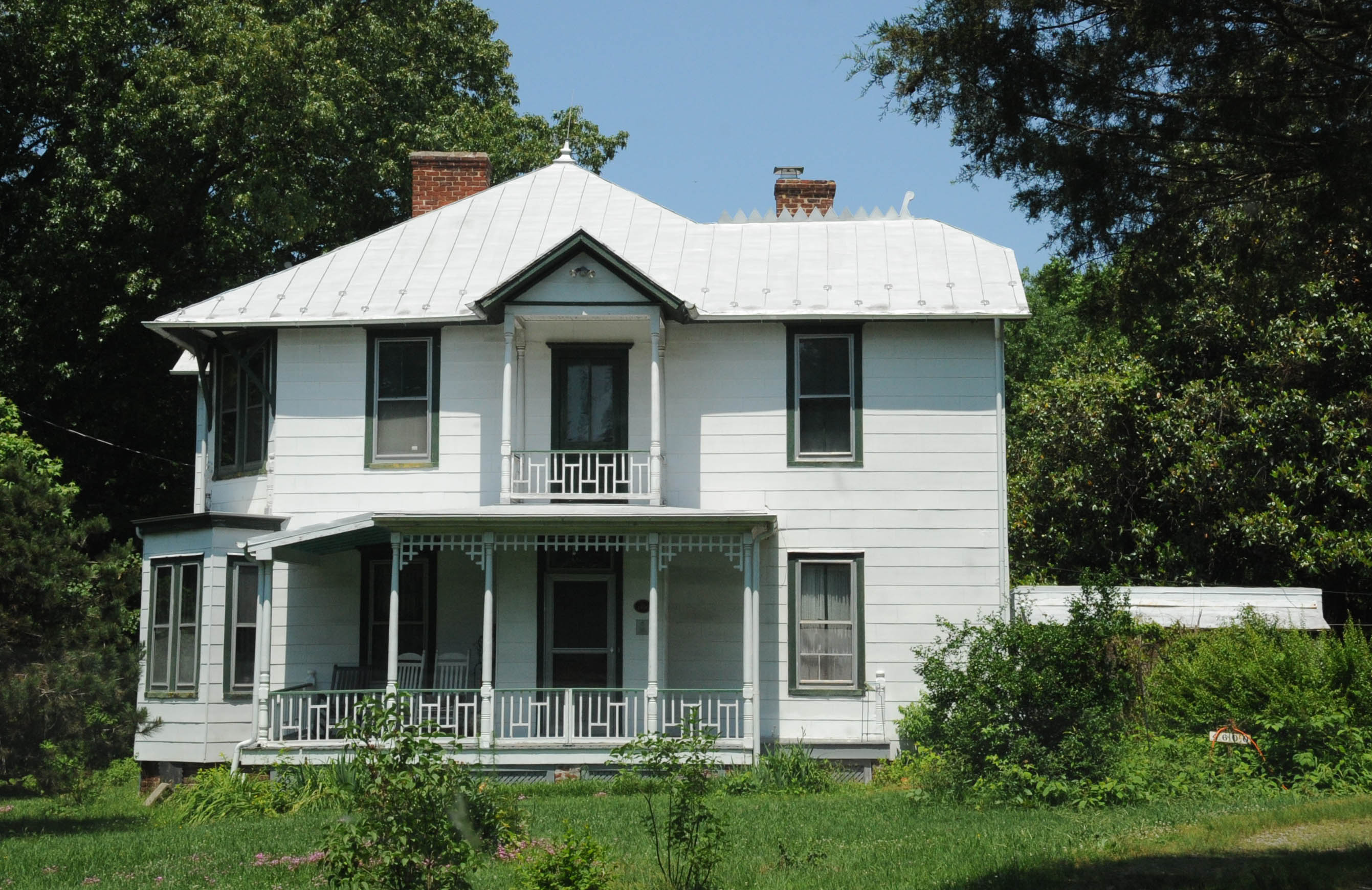

- Location within Virginia Location within the United States
- Location: 4600 Nine Mile Rd., near Richmond, Virginia
- Coordinates: 37°32′42″N 77°22′27″W
- Area: 3.2 acres (1.3 ha)
- Built: 1890
- Architectural style: Queen Anne
- NRHP reference No.: 03000446
- VLR No.: 043-5117

Significant dates
- Added to NRHP: May 22, 2003
- Designated VLR: December 4, 2002

Beth Elon is a Queen Anne style house built in Henrico County, Virginia, three miles from Richmond, Virginia, in 1890. It was listed on the National Register of Historic Places in 2003. The listing includes two contributing buildings and one other contributing site.

It was the home of Leslie and Laura Watson, who were musicians, early members of the American Guild of Organists.
