= Henrico Citizen =

Daily weekday online publication in Henrico County, Virginia

- Type: Daily weekday digital news organization (2001–2020); Online newspaper (2020–present)
- Founder: Tom Lappas
- Publisher: Tom Lappas
- Editor: Tom Lappas
- Founded: 2001; 25 years ago
- Headquarters: Henrico County, Virginia, U.S.
- Website: henricocitizen.com

The Henrico Citizen is a daily weekday community news organization in Henrico County, a suburb of Richmond, Virginia.

== History ==
The Citizen was created in 2001 by editor Tom Lappas.

Along with staff member Tara Gray, Lappas has launched three podcasts under the Henrico Citizen brand.

The Citizen ceased publishing a printed edition in March 2020 due to the economic impact of the COVID-19 pandemic and simultaneously expanded to a daily weekday publication online, through email and through social media and an app.
