= Henrico County Public Library =

Library system serving Henrico County, Virginia

Coordinates: 37.607883°N 77.565068°W

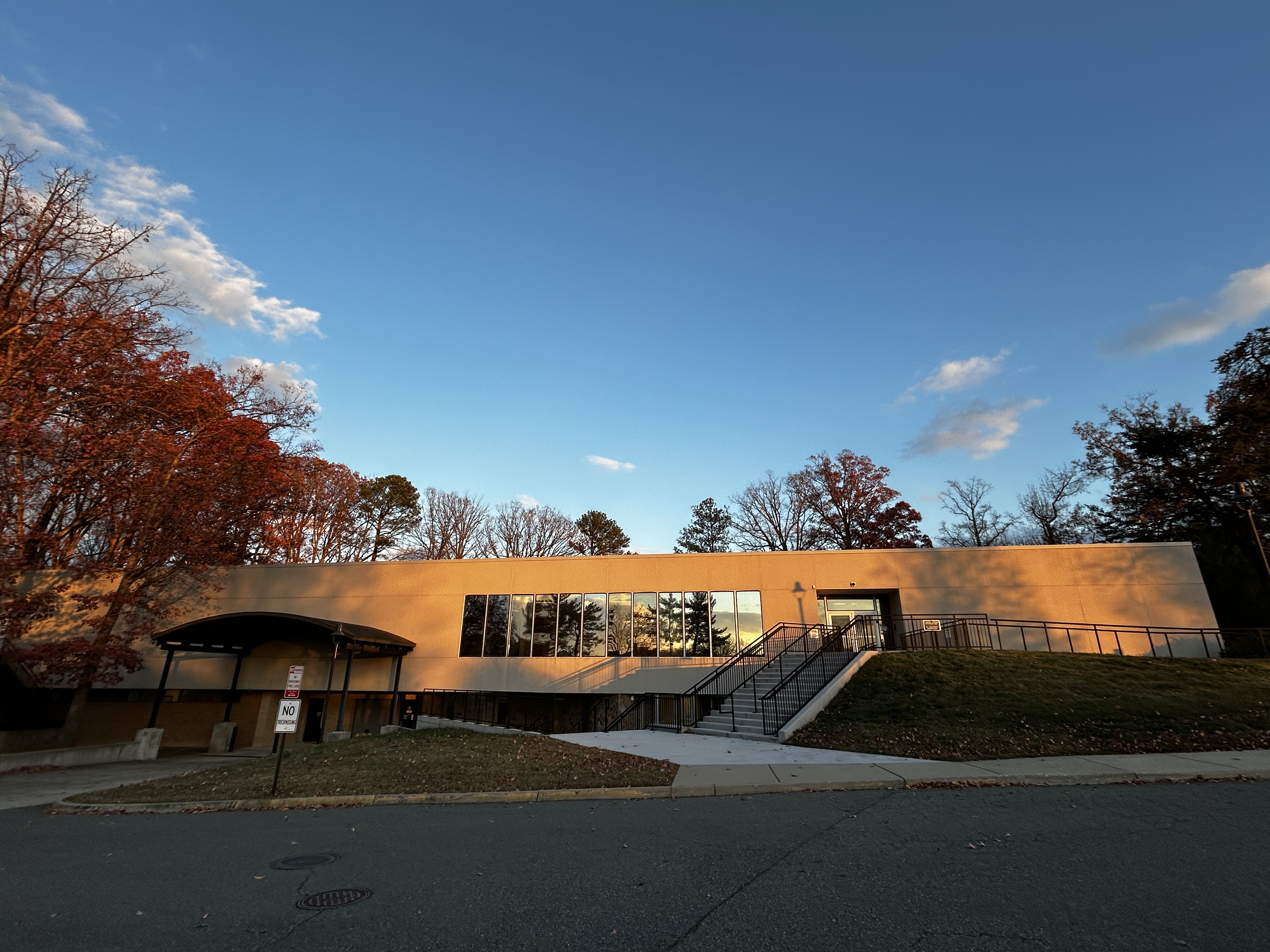
- Library Administrative Offices at 1700 N Parham Road
- Abbreviation: HCPL
- Purpose: Public Library System
- Director: Barbara Weedman

Henrico County Public Library system serves the county of Henrico, Virginia. The library system is within Region 4 of the Virginia Library Association (VLA). Henrico County Public Library System has eleven locations. The library branches house over 600 computers for public usage.

== Service area ==
According to the FY 2014 Institute of Museum and Library Services Data Catalog, the Library System has a service area population of 310,742 with 0 central libraries and 10 branch libraries.

== History ==
Henrico County Public Library System was created in 1963 through the Henrico County Board of Supervisors and a citizens' committee. The library system was granted three area libraries: Fairfield, Lakeside, and Tuckahoe. Two branch libraries were also set up Varina and Sandston. In 1966, the Henrico County Free Library System was established. The name was changed to Henrico County Public Library in 1967. By 1998, all buildings had public library access. In 1999, classes were created to teach community patrons how to use computers and access the Internet. Henrico County Public Library and Henrico County Public Schools partnered to provide students with access to students' school networks as well as library networks.

== Branches ==
Name	Type	Established	Address	Notes	Image
Fairfield Area Library	Area	1976	1401 N. Laburnum Avenue Henrico VA 23223		
Gayton Branch Library	Branch	1988	10600 Gayton Road Henrico VA 23238		
Glen Allen Branch Library	Branch	1995	10501 Staples Mill Road Glen Allen, VA 23060		
Libbie Mill Library	Area	2015	2100 Libbie Lake East Street Henrico VA 23230		
Municipal Government & Law Library (Joseph P. Rapisarda, Jr. Law Collection)	Collection	1977	Located in the Tuckahoe Area Library at 1901 Starling Drive Henrico, VA 23229		
North Park Branch Library	Branch	2001	8508 Franconia Road Henrico VA 23227		
Sandston Branch Library	Branch	1980	23 E. Williamsburg Road Sandston VA 23150	The library was built on the location of the first Henrico library, which was in operation 1923-1980	
Tuckahoe Area Library	Area	1971	1901 Starling Drive Henrico, VA 23229	The current location was built in 2006	
Twin Hickory Area Library	Area	2007	5001 Twin Hickory Road Glen Allen, VA 23059	Replaced the Innsbrook branch, established in 1992	
Varina Area Library	Area	2016	1875 New Market Road Henrico VA 23231		
Mobile Library Service	Van	1977	Address listed at the Library Administrative Offices at 1700 North Parham Road Henrico VA 23229	The current Mobile Library van is a 2012 model.	
