= Ginter Park =

- Ginter Park Historic District
- U.S. National Register of Historic Places
- U.S. Historic district
- Virginia Landmarks Register
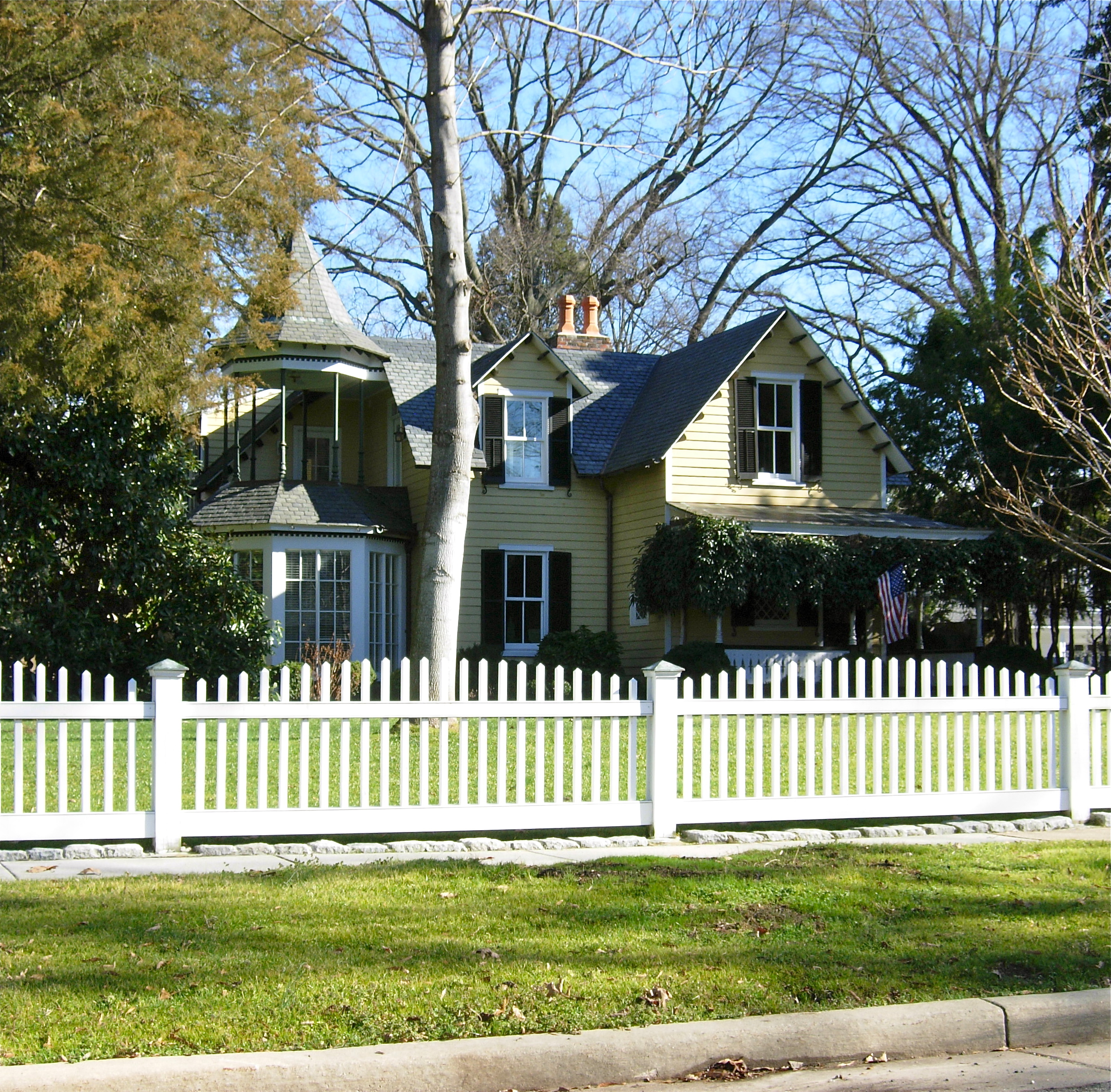
- A house within the Ginter Park Historic District

- Location within Virginia Location within the United States
- Location: Roughly bounded by North Ave., Moss Side and Hawthorne and Chamberlayne Aves., Brookland Park Blvd., and Brook Rd., Richmond, Virginia
- Coordinates: 37°34′50″N 77°26′50″W
- Area: 290 acres (120 ha)
- Architectural style: Colonial Revival, Builder's Vernacular
- NRHP reference No.: 86002688
- VLR No.: 127-0201

Significant dates
- Added to NRHP: September 22, 1986
- Designated VLR: June 17, 1986, December 17, 2009

Ginter Park is a suburban neighborhood of Richmond, Virginia built on land owned and developed by Lewis Ginter. The neighborhood's first well known resident was newspaperman Joseph Bryan, who lived in Laburnum, first built in 1883 and later rebuilt. In 1895, many acres of land north of Richmond were purchased by Ginter in order to develop into neighborhoods. Ginter Park and other neighborhoods were developed from this initial land purchase. In Ginter Park are Union Presbyterian Seminary and as well as Pollard Park.

Nearby are the Children's Hospital of Richmond and John Marshall High School.

While the borders of Northside are not exact, nearby Northside neighborhoods include Barton Heights, Highland Park, Laburnum Park, Sherwood Park and Bellevue.

The Ginter Park Historic District was listed on the National Register of Historic Places in 1986. It encompasses 291 contributing buildings and 179 contributing structures.
