= Montrose, Virginia =

- Census-designated place
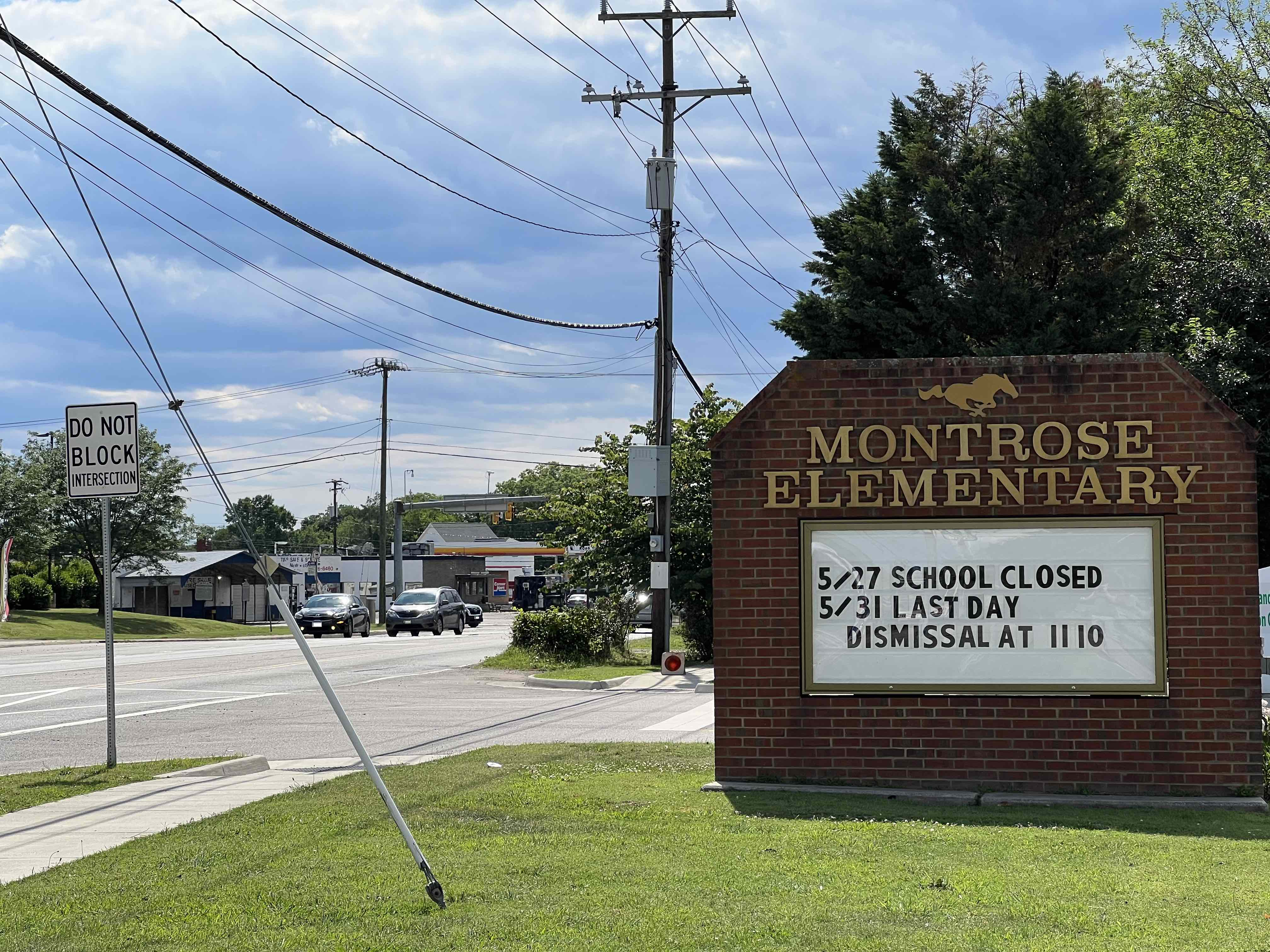

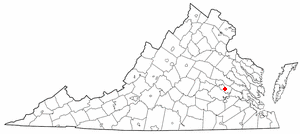
- Location of Montrose, Virginia
- Coordinates: 37°31′14″N 77°22′42″W
- Country: United States
- State: Virginia
- County: Henrico

Area
  - Total: 3.3 sq mi (8.5 km^{2})
  - Land: 3.2 sq mi (8.3 km^{2})
  - Water: 0.077 sq mi (0.2 km^{2})
- Elevation: 161 ft (49 m)

Population (2020)
  - Total: 7,909
  - Density: 2,500/sq mi (950/km^{2})
- Time zone: UTC−5 (Eastern (EST))
  - Summer (DST): UTC−4 (EDT)
- ZIP code: 23231
- Area code: 804
- FIPS code: 51-52904
- GNIS feature ID: 1867596

Montrose is a census-designated place (CDP) in Henrico County, Virginia, United States. The population was 7,909 at the 2020 census.

== Geography ==
Montrose is located at 37°31′14″N 77°22′42″W (37.520646, −77.378212).

According to the United States Census Bureau, the CDP has a total area of 3.3 square miles (8.5 km^{2}), of which 3.2 square miles (8.3 km^{2}) is land and 0.077 square miles (0.2 km^{2}), or 2.31%, is water.

== Demographics ==
Historical population
Census	Pop.	Note	%±
1980	5,349		—
1990	6,405		19.7%
2000	7,018		9.6%
2010	7,993		13.9%
2020	7,909		−1.1%
U.S. Decennial Census; 1950 1960 1970; 1980 1990 2000; 2010

Montrose was first listed as a census designated place in the 1980 U.S. census.

=== 2020 census ===
Montrose CDP, Virginia – Racial and ethnic composition Note: the US Census treats Hispanic/Latino as an ethnic category. This table excludes Latinos from the racial categories and assigns them to a separate category. Hispanics/Latinos may be of any race.
Race / Ethnicity (NH = Non-Hispanic)	Pop 1980	Pop 2010	Pop 2020	% 1980	% 2010	% 2020
White alone (NH)	4,710	2,198	1,733	88.05%	27.50%	21.91%
Black or African American alone (NH)	547	5,270	5,389	10.23%	65.93%	68.14%
Native American or Alaska Native alone (NH)		29	29		0.36%	0.37%
Asian alone (NH)		82	71		1.03%	0.90%
Native Hawaiian or Pacific Islander alone (NH)		2	4		0.03%	0.05%
Other race alone (NH)		12	57		0.15%	0.72%
Mixed race or Multiracial (NH)		194	257		2.43%	3.25%
Hispanic or Latino (any race)	31	206	369	0.58%	2.58%	4.67%
Total	5,349	7,993	7,909	100.00%	100.00%	100.00%

=== 2000 Census ===
As of the census of 2000, there were 7,018 people, 2,924 households, and 1,850 families residing in the CDP. The population density was 2,062.4 people per square mile (797.0/km^{2}). There were 3,081 housing units at an average density of 905.4/sq mi (349.9/km^{2}). The racial makeup of the CDP was 46.48% White, 49.97% African American, 0.36% Native American, 1.01% Asian, 0.88% from other races, and 1.30% from two or more races. Hispanic or Latino of any race were 1.57% of the population.

There were 2,924 households, out of which 34.3% had children under the age of 18 living with them, 33.9% were married couples living together, 24.8% had a female householder with no husband present, and 36.7% were non-families. 29.9% of all households were made up of individuals, and 9.1% had someone living alone who was 65 years of age or older. The average household size was 2.40 and the average family size was 2.97.

In the CDP, the population was spread out, with 27.4% under the age of 18, 10.3% from 18 to 24, 32.9% from 25 to 44, 19.6% from 45 to 64, and 9.7% who were 65 years of age or older. The median age was 33 years. For every 100 females, there were 82.9 males. For every 100 females age 18 and over, there were 75.8 males.

The median income for a household in the CDP was $36,433, and the median income for a family was $42,031. Males had a median income of $30,903 versus $24,966 for females. The per capita income for the CDP was $17,259. About 9.8% of families and 11.9% of the population were below the poverty line, including 18.0% of those under age 18 and 10.6% of those age 65 or over.
