= East Highland Park, Virginia =

- Census-designated place
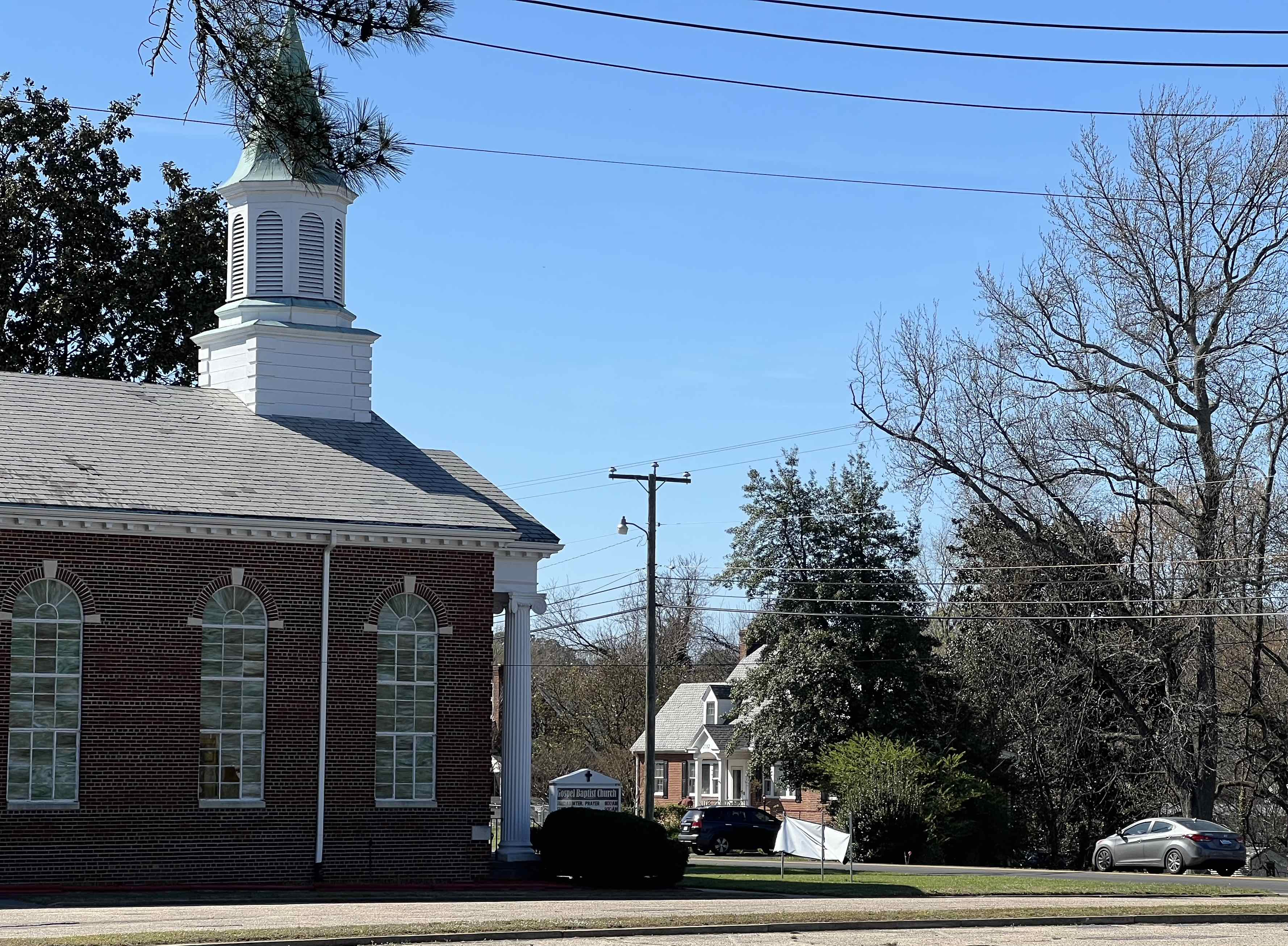

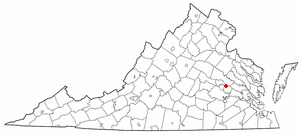
- Location of East Highland Park, Virginia
- Coordinates: 37°34′15″N 77°23′48″W
- Country: United States
- State: Virginia
- County: Henrico

Area
  - Total: 9.0 sq mi (23.3 km^{2})
  - Land: 8.8 sq mi (22.8 km^{2})
  - Water: 0.19 sq mi (0.5 km^{2})
- Elevation: 200 ft (61 m)

Population (2020)
  - Total: 15,131
  - Density: 1,720/sq mi (664/km^{2})
- Time zone: UTC−5 (Eastern (EST))
  - Summer (DST): UTC−4 (EDT)
- FIPS code: 51-24496
- GNIS feature ID: 1499371

East Highland Park is a census-designated place (CDP) in Henrico County, Virginia, United States. The population was 15,131 at the 2020 census.

== Geography ==
East Highland Park is located at 37°34′15″N 77°23′48″W (37.570945, −77.396655).

According to the United States Census Bureau, the CDP has a total area of 9.0 square miles (23.3 km^{2}), of which 8.8 square miles (22.8 km^{2}) is land and 0.19 square miles (0.5 km^{2}), or 2.24%, is water.

== Demographics ==
Historical population
Census	Pop.	Note	%±
1980	11,797		—
1990	11,850		0.4%
2000	12,488		5.4%
2010	14,796		18.5%
2020	15,131		2.3%
U.S. Decennial Census; 1950 1960 1970; 1980 1990 2000; 2010

East Highland Park was first listed as a census designated place in the 1980 U.S. census.

=== Racial and ethnic composition ===
East Highland Park CDP, Virginia – Racial and ethnic composition Note: the US Census treats Hispanic/Latino as an ethnic category. This table excludes Latinos from the racial categories and assigns them to a separate category. Hispanics/Latinos may be of any race.
Race / Ethnicity (NH = Non-Hispanic)	Pop 1980	Pop 2000	Pop 2010	Pop 2020	% 1980	% 2000	% 2010	% 2020
White alone (NH)	5,616	2,261	1,522	1,326	10.29%	18.11%	10.29%	8.76%
Black or African American alone (NH)	6,037	9,879	12,459	12,579	51.17%	79.11%	84.21%	83.13%
Native American or Alaska Native alone (NH)		36	50	47		0.29%	0.34%	0.31%
Asian alone (NH)		44	104	143		0.35%	0.70%	0.95%
Native Hawaiian or Pacific Islander alone (NH)		1	5	3		0.01%	0.03%	0.02%
Other race alone (NH)		18	26	72		0.14%	0.18%	0.48%
Mixed race or Multiracial (NH)		124	279	511		0.99%	1.89%	3.38%
Hispanic or Latino (any race)	74	125	351	450	0.63%	1.00%	2.37%	2.97%
Total	11,797	12,488	14,796	15,131	100.00%	100.00%	100.00%	100.00%

=== 2020 census ===
As of the 2020 census, East Highland Park had a population of 15,131. The median age was 41.0 years. 20.8% of residents were under the age of 18 and 17.4% of residents were 65 years of age or older. For every 100 females there were 81.3 males, and for every 100 females age 18 and over there were 77.4 males age 18 and over.

95.9% of residents lived in urban areas, while 4.1% lived in rural areas.

There were 6,134 households in East Highland Park, of which 28.8% had children under the age of 18 living in them. Of all households, 30.5% were married-couple households, 18.7% were households with a male householder and no spouse or partner present, and 43.7% were households with a female householder and no spouse or partner present. About 30.2% of all households were made up of individuals and 11.6% had someone living alone who was 65 years of age or older.

There were 6,457 housing units, of which 5.0% were vacant. The homeowner vacancy rate was 1.4% and the rental vacancy rate was 6.2%.

=== 2000 census ===
As of the 2000 census, there were 12,488 people, 4,960 households, and 3,313 families residing in the CDP. The population density was 1,393.1 people per square mile (538.1/km^{2}). There were 5,226 housing units at an average density of 583.0/sq mi (225.2/km^{2}). The racial makeup of the CDP was 18.47% White, 79.36% African American, 0.29% Native American, 0.39% Asian, 0.01% Pacific Islander, 0.34% from other races, and 1.15% from two or more races. Hispanic or Latino of any race were 1.00% of the population.

There were 4,960 households, out of which 29.7% had children under the age of 18 living with them, 38.9% were married couples living together, 23.3% had a female householder with no husband present, and 33.2% were non-families. 28.4% of all households were made up of individuals, and 7.3% had someone living alone who was 65 years of age or older. The average household size was 2.48 and the average family size was 3.02.

In the CDP, the population was spread out, with 25.2% under the age of 18, 7.7% from 18 to 24, 29.6% from 25 to 44, 25.2% from 45 to 64, and 12.4% who were 65 years of age or older. The median age was 37 years. For every 100 females, there were 84.6 males. For every 100 females age 18 and over, there were 79.1 males.

The median income for a household in the CDP was $36,328, and the median income for a family was $43,781. Males had a median income of $31,504 versus $25,500 for females. The per capita income for the CDP was $17,251. About 6.9% of families and 9.5% of the population were below the poverty line, including 12.0% of those under age 18 and 9.2% of those age 65 or over.
