= Laburnum Park Historic District =

Historic district in Virginia, United States

- U.S. National Register of Historic Places
- U.S. Historic district
- Virginia Landmarks Register
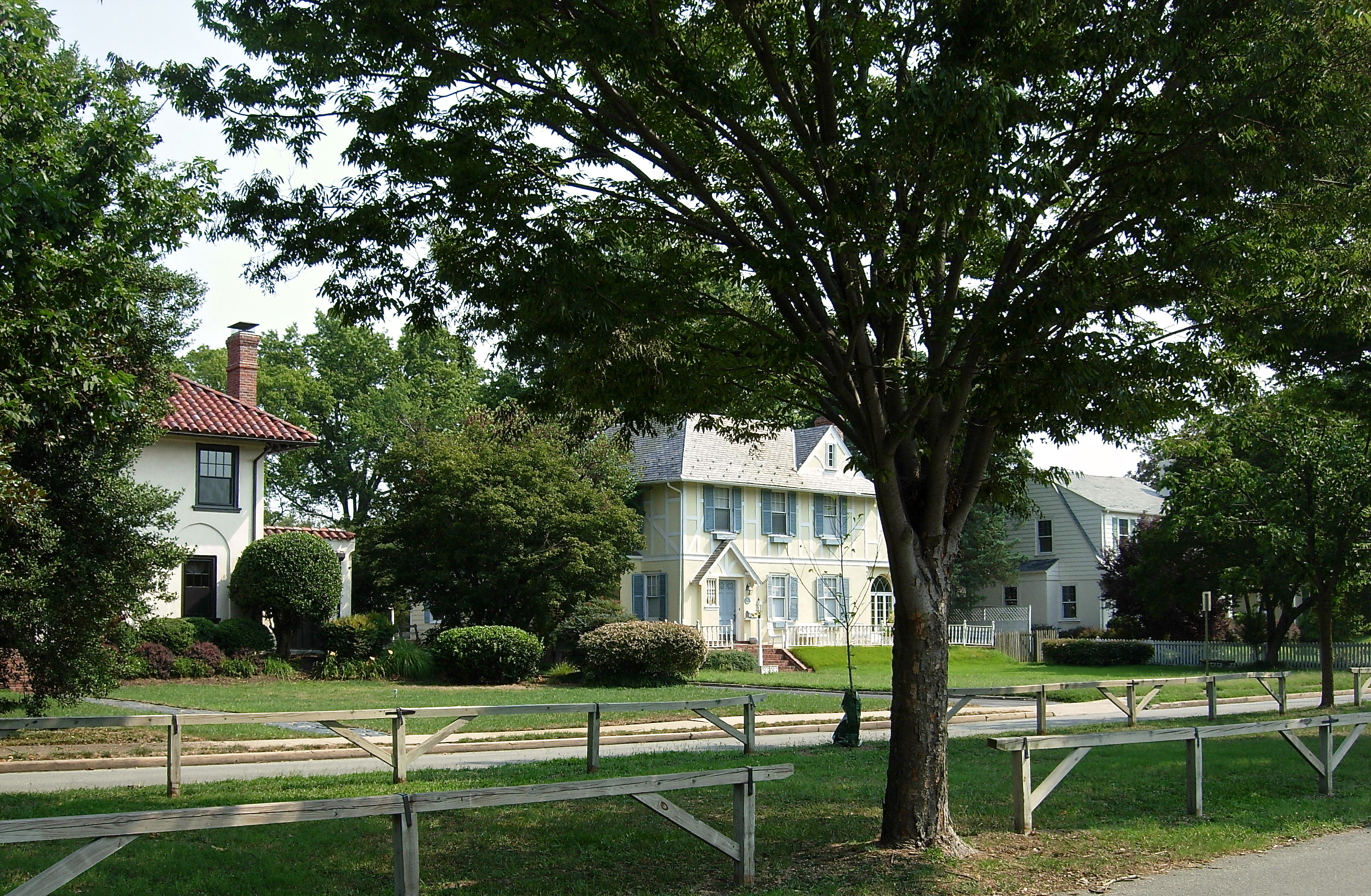
- Laburnum Park Historic District, August 2012

- Location within Virginia Location within the United States
- Location: Westwood, Palmyra, Laburnum Park Boulevard (formerly Confederate Avenue), Wilmington, W. Laburnum Aves., Chatham, Gloucester and Lamont Sts., Richmond, Virginia
- Coordinates: 37°34′52″N 77°27′23″W
- Area: 116 acres (47 ha)
- Built: 1908
- Architect: Hallett, Marcus A. & Pratt, Roy G.; et al.
- Architectural style: Queen Anne, Colonial Revival, et al.
- NRHP reference No.: 01001573
- VLR No.: 127-5895

Significant dates
- Added to NRHP: February 5, 2002
- Designated VLR: February 5, 2002, March 15, 2006

The Laburnum Park Historic District is a national historic district located at Richmond, Virginia. The district encompasses 226 contributing buildings and 2 contributing structures located north of downtown Richmond. The primarily residential area developed starting in the early-20th century as one of the city's early "streetcar suburbs" and as home to several important local institutions. The buildings are in a variety of popular early-20th century architectural styles including Queen Anne and Colonial Revival. It was developed as neighborhood of middle-to-upper-class, single-family dwellings. Notable buildings include the Laburnum House (1908), Richmond Memorial Hospital (1954–1957), Richmond Memorial Hospital Nursing School (1960–1961), "The Hermitage" (1911), Laburnum Court (1919), Veritas School.

It was added to the National Register of Historic Places in 2002.
