= Henrico County, Virginia =

County in Virginia, United States

- County
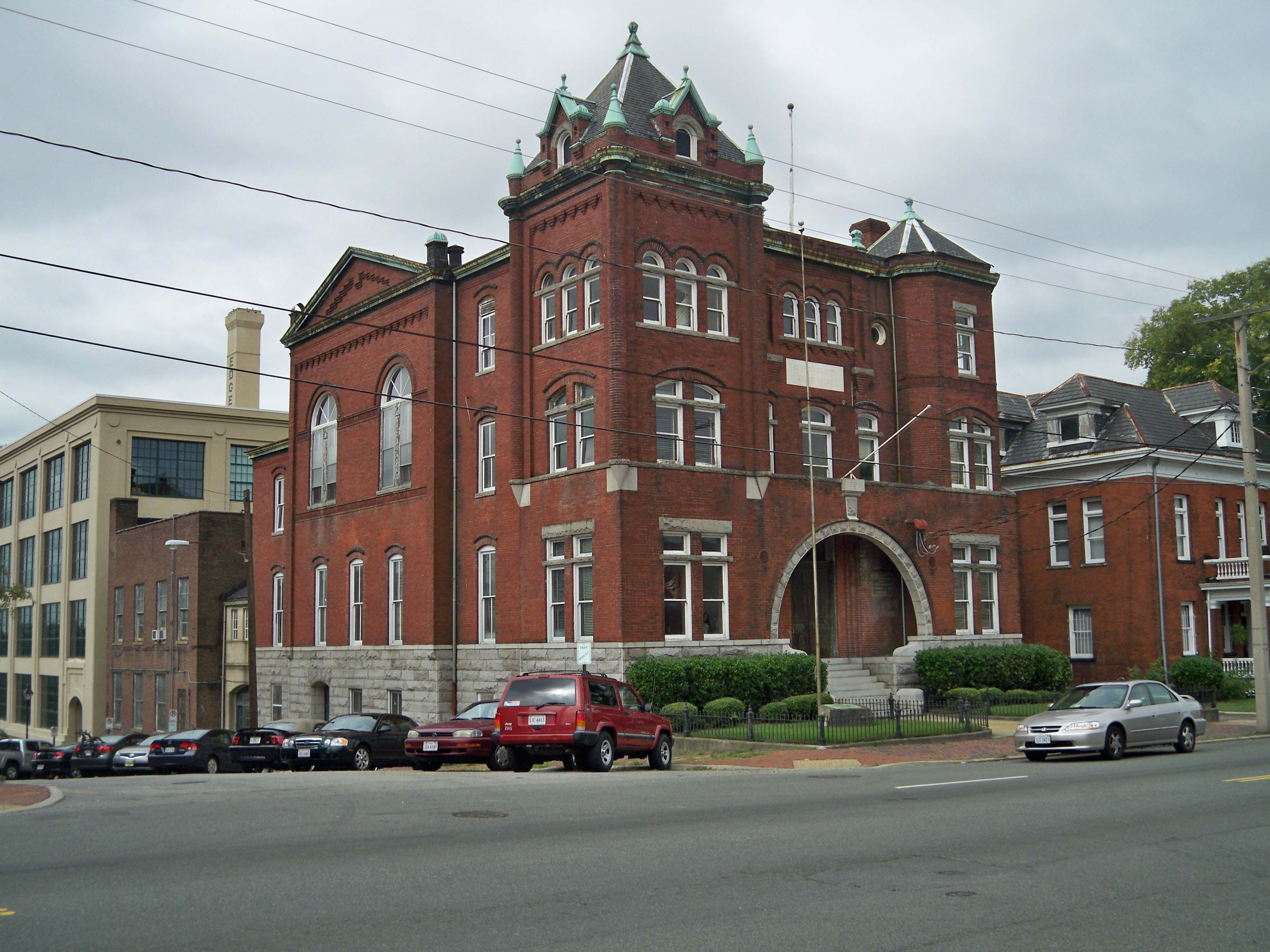
- The Old Henrico County Courthouse in Richmond.

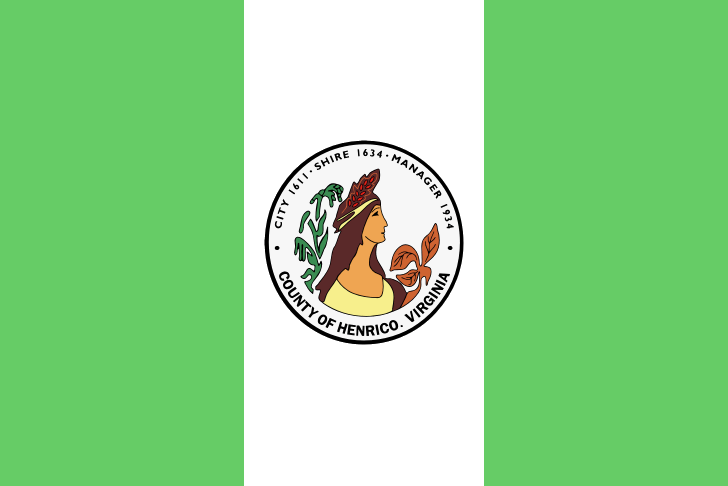
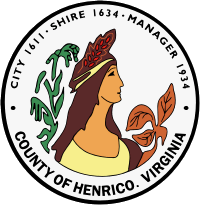
- Flag Seal

- Location within the U.S. state of Virginia
- Coordinates: 37.55°N 77.40°W
- Country: United States
- State: Virginia
- Founded: 1611
- Named for: Henricus
- Seat: Laurel
- Largest community: Tuckahoe

Government
  - Manager: John Vithoulkas

Area
  - Total: 245 sq mi (630 km^{2})
  - Land: 237.65 sq mi (615.5 km^{2})
  - Water: 7.35 sq mi (19.0 km^{2}) 3 (approx)%

Population (2020)
  - Total: 334,389
  - Estimate (2025): 342,775 ▲
  - Density: 1,407.1/sq mi (543.27/km^{2})
- Time zone: UTC−5 (Eastern)
  - Summer (DST): UTC−4 (EDT)
- Congressional districts: 4th, 1st
- Website: henrico.gov

Henrico County /hɛnˈraɪkoʊ/, officially the County of Henrico, is a county located in the Commonwealth of Virginia in the United States. As of the 2020 census, its population was 334,000 making it the fifth-most-populous county in Virginia. Henrico County is included in the Greater Richmond Region. There is no incorporated community within Henrico County; thus, it has no incorporated county seat. Laurel, an unincorporated census designated place, serves this function.

The county was named for Henry, Prince of Wales. In 1634, Henrico was reorganized as Henrico Shire, one of the eight original Shires of Virginia. It is one of the United States' oldest counties. The City of Richmond was officially part of Henrico County until 1842, when it became a fully independent city.

The present-day Henrico County curves around the City of Richmond, surrounding it to the west, north, and east. The county is bounded by the Chickahominy River to the north, Tuckahoe Creek to the west, and the James River and Richmond to the south.

Richmond International Airport is located in the eastern portion of Henrico County in Sandston. Top private employers in the county include Capital One, Bon Secours, and Elevance Health.

== History ==
In 1611, Thomas Dale founded the Citie of Henricus on a peninsula in the James River that is now called Farrar's Island. Henricus was named for Henry Frederick, Prince of Wales, but it was destroyed during the Indian massacre of 1622, during which local Native American warriors of the Powhatan confederacy attacked the English settlers to drive them from the area.

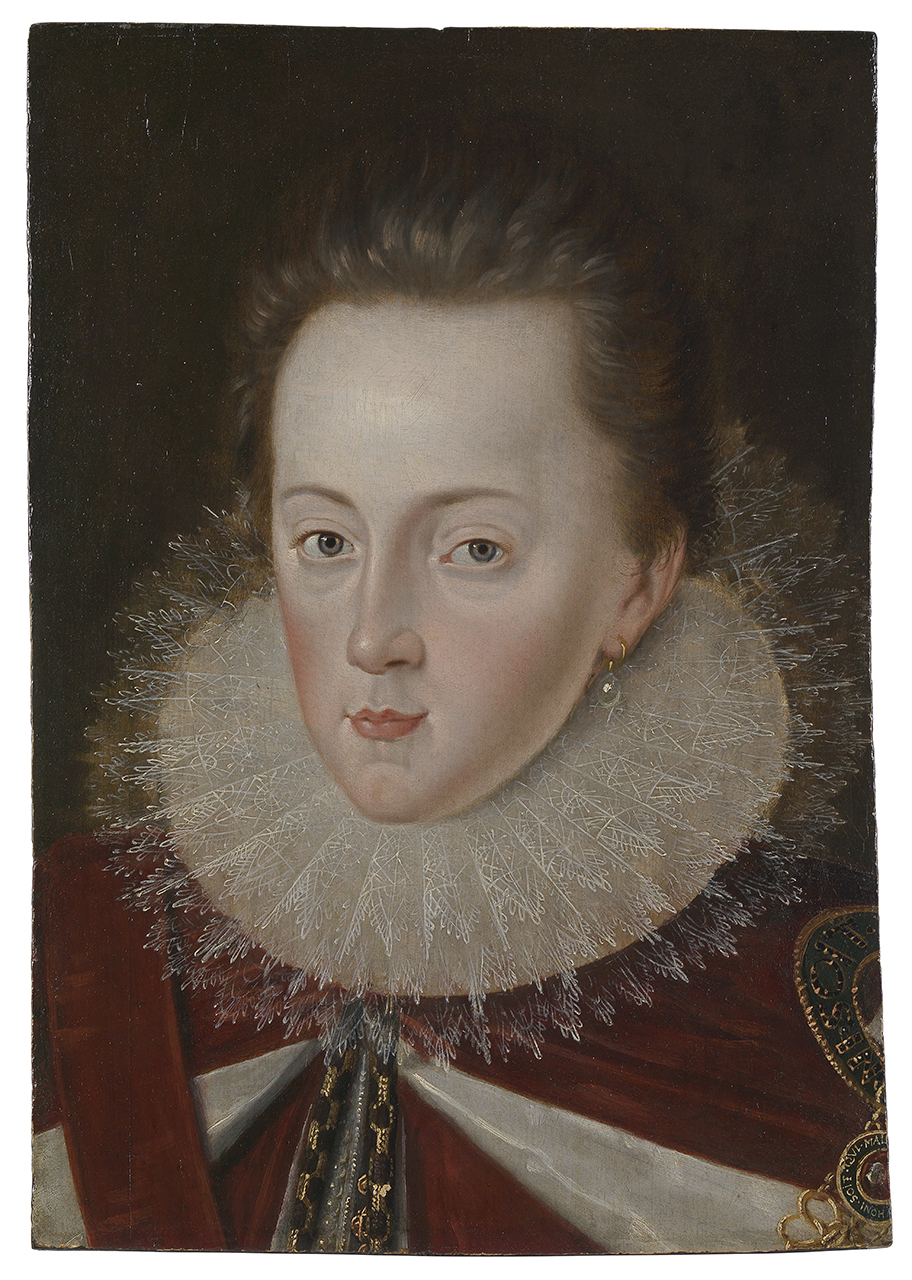
Henry Frederick, Prince of Wales

In 1634, Henrico Shire was one of the eight original Shires of Virginia established in the Virginia Colony. Since then, 10 counties and three independent cities have been formed from the original territory of Henrico Shire.

County/City	Year founded
Goochland County	1728
Albemarle County	1744
Chesterfield County	1749
Cumberland County	1749
Amherst County	1761
Buckingham County	1761
Fluvanna County	1777
Powhatan County	1777
Nelson County	1807
City of Richmond	1842
Appomattox County (part)	1845
City of Charlottesville	1888
City of Colonial Heights	1948

In 1776, Richard Adams and Nathaniel Wilkenson participated in the Fifth Virginia Convention, which voted to send delegates to the Continental Congress to propose separation from the British. That proposal led to the Declaration of Independence. During the Revolutionary War, when Benedict Arnold's invading army occupied Richmond in January 1781, the Henrico militia was called to active duty. During the brief British occupation of Richmond, many Henrico court records were destroyed. Three months later when Arnold's men, now part of British forces led by General William Phillips, approached Richmond for a second time, the British were stopped by the sight of local militiamen and American Continental troops led by a young Frenchman, the Marquis de Lafayette. Outnumbered, Lafayette abandoned Richmond when General Charles Cornwallis occupied the town in June 1781. Cornwallis then retired to Williamsburg and later to Yorktown. After being surrounded there by General George Washington and his French allies, Cornwallis surrendered, effectively ending the American Revolution.

Since becoming independent in 1842, the City of Richmond has successfully annexed portions of Henrico five times. Chesterfield County annexed the site of Henricus in 1922.

Henrico was badly hurt in the Civil War. During the Reconstruction era, Virginia Estelle Randolph was a pioneer educator and humanitarian who lived from 1874 to 1958. She opened the old Mountain Road School in 1892 and was named the first Jeanes Supervisor Industrial Teacher in Henrico County Schools in 1908. She conducted the first Arbor Day program in Virginia.

The USS Henrico was a Bayfield-class attack transport involved in World War II and subsequent conflicts.

Richmond attempted to completely merge with Henrico in 1961, but 61% of the votes in a referendum in Henrico County voted against the merger. In 1965, Richmond attempted to annex 145 square miles of Henrico County, but after a lengthy court battle, the city was given permission to annex only 17 square miles. Since the city would have had to reimburse Henrico a hefty $55 million, Richmond opted against annexing the area.

In 1981, the Virginia General Assembly placed a moratorium on all annexations throughout the state. Henrico's borders have not changed since Richmond's 1942 annexation.

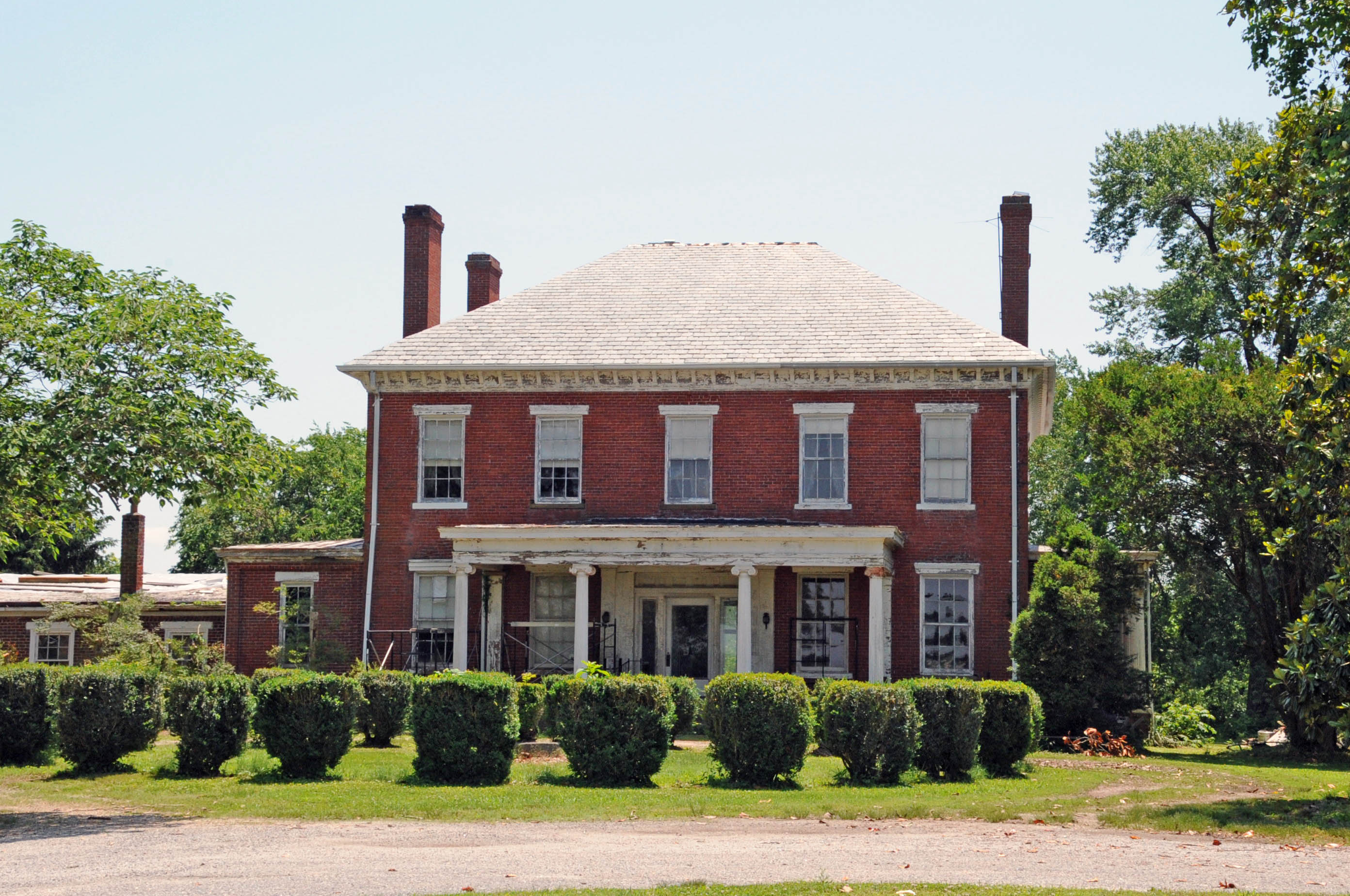
Varina Farms Plantation

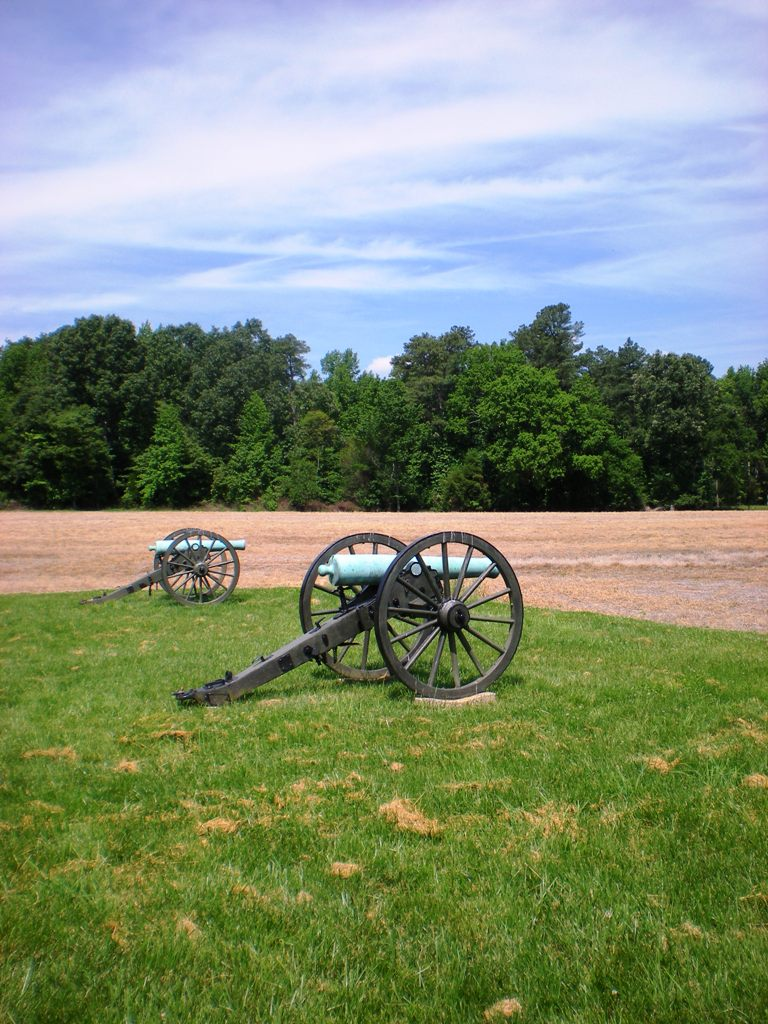
Cannons at the site of the Battle of Malvern Hill

The original county seat was at Varina, at the Varina Farms plantation across the James River from Henricus. Colonist John Rolfe built this plantation, where he lived with his wife, Pocahontas. Henrico's government was located at Varina from around 1640 until 1752.

In 1752, Henrico relocated its seat to a more central location inside the city of Richmond, between Church Hill and what is now Tobacco Row. The county seat remained at 22nd and Main St in Richmond even after the city's government became fully independent of the county in 1842. In 1974, the county moved out of the Henrico County Courthouse to a complex in the western portion of the county at the intersection of Parham Road and Hungary Springs Road in Laurel.

In addition to the 1974 complex, in 1988, the county opened its Eastern Government Center to be more convenient to county residents in the eastern portion of the county. It is located on Nine Mile Road.

=== American Civil War battle sites ===
During the Civil War in 1862, Henrico County was the site of numerous battles during the Peninsula Campaign, including:

- Battle of Seven Pines
- Battle of Savage's Station
- Battle of Oak Grove
- Battle of Garnett's & Golding's Farm
- Battle of White Oak Swamp
- Battle of Glendale
- Battle of Malvern Hill

Additional significant battles took place in 1864 during the Overland Campaign prior to and during the Siege of Petersburg, which led to the fall of Richmond. Confederate General J.E.B. Stuart was mortally wounded in Henrico County at the Battle of Yellow Tavern on May 12, 1864.

== Transportation ==
Henrico County is one of only two counties in Virginia that maintain their own roads, with the other being Arlington County. This special status was due to the existence of county highway departments prior to the creation in 1927 of the state agency that is now Virginia Department of Transportation and the assumption by that agency in 1932 of local roads in most counties. (Henrico and Arlington were grandfathered and allowed to continue pre-existing arrangements.) The control of the roads system is considered a powerful advantage for community urban planners, who can require developers to contribute to funding needed for road needs serving the planners' and developers' projects.

Henrico County is the site of Richmond International Airport. It hosts an Amtrak rail passenger station, Richmond Staples Mill Road station. It purchases public bus route services from Greater Richmond Transit Company, an FTA-funded public service company that is owned equally by the City of Richmond and neighboring Chesterfield County.

After Reconstruction, Henrico County used convict leasing to build roads in 1878.

Some old roads continue to be in use today, such as Horsepen Road, Three Chopt Road, and Quiocassin Road.

=== Major highways ===
==== Interstates ====
- I-64
- I-95
- I-195
- I-295

==== US Highways ====
- US 1
- US 33
- US 60
- US 250
- US 301
- US 360

==== State routes ====
- SR 2
- SR 5
- SR 6
- SR 33
- SR 73
- SR 76
- SR 147
- SR 150
- SR 156
- SR 157
- SR 161
- SR 197
- SR 271
- SR 356
- SR 895

== Geography ==
According to the U.S. Census Bureau, the county has a total area of 245 square miles (630 km^{2}), of which 11 sq mi (28 km^{2}) (4.6%) are covered by water.

=== Adjacent counties ===
- Charles City County (southeast)
- Chesterfield County (south)
- Goochland County (west)
- Hanover County (north)
- New Kent County (northeast)
- Richmond (south)
- Powhatan County (southwest at James River)

=== National protected area ===
- Richmond National Battlefield Park (part)

=== Climate ===
Henrico County is located within the humid subtropical climate zone and has hot and humid summers with moderately cold winters. Henrico County on average has 8 snow days and 88 days when the low falls below freezing, 50 days when the high exceeds 90 °F, and 8 days when the high does not exceed freezing.

Climate data for Tuckahoe, Virginia (1980–2010)
Month	Jan	Feb	Mar	Apr	May	Jun	Jul	Aug	Sep	Oct	Nov	Dec	Year
Mean daily maximum °F (°C)	46.9 (8.3)	50.8 (10.4)	59.4 (15.2)	70.1 (21.2)	77.4 (25.2)	85.1 (29.5)	88.5 (31.4)	87.1 (30.6)	80.9 (27.2)	70.7 (21.5)	60.7 (15.9)	50.1 (10.1)	69.0 (20.5)
Mean daily minimum °F (°C)	25.2 (−3.8)	27.4 (−2.6)	33.6 (0.9)	42.9 (6.1)	51.8 (11.0)	61.3 (16.3)	65.6 (18.7)	64.4 (18.0)	56.8 (13.8)	45.1 (7.3)	36.0 (2.2)	28.1 (−2.2)	44.8 (7.1)
Average precipitation inches (mm)	3.2 (81)	2.9 (74)	3.9 (99)	3.3 (84)	3.9 (99)	3.5 (89)	4.3 (110)	4.2 (110)	3.7 (94)	3.3 (84)	3.6 (91)	3.4 (86)	43.2 (1,101)
Source: USA.com

Source: Climate-data.org

== Demographics ==
Historical population
Census	Pop.	Note	%±
1790	12,000		—
1800	14,886		24.1%
1810	19,680		32.2%
1820	23,667		20.3%
1830	28,797		21.7%
1840	33,076		14.9%
1850	43,572		31.7%
1860	61,616		41.4%
1870	66,179		7.4%
1880	82,703		25.0%
1890	103,394		25.0%
1900	30,062		−70.9%
1910	23,437		−22.0%
1920	18,972		−19.1%
1930	30,310		59.8%
1940	41,960		38.4%
1950	57,340		36.7%
1960	117,339		104.6%
1970	154,364		31.6%
1980	180,735		17.1%
1990	217,881		20.6%
2000	262,300		20.4%
2010	306,935		17.0%
2020	334,389		8.9%
2025 (est.)	342,775	▲	2.5%
U.S. Decennial Census; 1790–1960 1900–1990; 1990–2000 2000-2010; 2010-2020

=== Racial and ethnic composition ===
Henrico County, Virginia – Racial and ethnic composition Note: the US Census treats Hispanic/Latino as an ethnic category. This table excludes Latinos from the racial categories and assigns them to a separate category. Hispanics/Latinos may be of any race.
Race / ethnicity (NH = Non-Hispanic)	Pop 1980	Pop 1990	Pop 2000	Pop 2010	Pop 2020	% 1980	% 1990	% 2000	% 2010	% 2020
White alone (NH)	150,140	167,062	178,000	174,799	167,030	83.07%	76.68%	67.86%	56.95%	49.95%
Black or African American alone (NH)	26,938	43,648	64,342	89,449	96,332	14.90%	20.03%	24.53%	29.14%	28.81%
Native American or Alaska Native alone (NH)	436	617	862	844	888	0.24%	0.28%	0.33%	0.27%	0.27%
Asian alone (NH)	1,468	4,289	9,415	19,956	32,175	0.81%	1.97%	3.59%	6.50%	9.62%
Native Hawaiian or Pacific Islander alone (NH)	x	x	71	112	127	x	x	0.03%	0.04%	0.04%
Other race alone (NH)	338	94	428	792	1,955	0.19%	0.04%	0.16%	0.26%	0.58%
Mixed race or Multiracial (NH)	x	x	3,236	5,982	13,797	x	x	1.23%	1.95%	4.13%
Hispanic or Latino (any race)	1,415	2,171	5,946	15,001	22,085	0.78%	1.00%	2.27%	4.89%	6.60%
Total	180,735	217,881	262,300	306,935	334,389	100.00%	100.00%	100.00%	100.00%	100.00%

=== 2020 census ===
As of the 2020 census, the county had a population of 334,389. The median age was 39.1 years; 22.6% of residents were under 18 and 16.6% were 65 or older. For every 100 females, there were 88.8 males, and for every 100 females 18 and over, there were 85.0 males 18 and over.

The racial makeup of the county was 51.0% White, 29.2% Black or African American, 0.4% American Indian and Alaska Native, 9.7% Asian, 0.0% Native Hawaiian and Pacific Islander, 3.3% from some other race, and 6.4% from two or more races. Hispanic or Latino residents of any race comprised 6.6% of the population.

About 96.3% of the residents lived in urban areas, while 3.7% lived in rural areas.

Of the 134,234 households in the county, 31.6% had children under 18 living with them, and 32.6% had a female householder with no spouse or partner present. About 29.0% of all households were made up of individuals, and 11.7% had someone living alone who was 65 or older.

The county had 140,739 housing units, of which 4.6% were vacant. Among occupied housing units, 62.7% were owner-occupied and 37.3% were renter-occupied. The homeowner vacancy rate was 1.1% and the rental vacancy rate was 5.8%.

=== 2010 Census ===
As of the 2010 census, 306,935 people, 127,111 households, and 69,846 families were residing in the county. The population density was 1,252 people per square mile (483 people/km^{2}). As of 2019, the 139,274 housing units had an average density of 568 units per square mile (219 units/km^{2}). In 2018, the racial makeup of the county was 57% White, 29.5% Black or African American, 0.2% Native American, 8.2% Asian, 0.03% Pacific Islander, 0.98% from other races, and 3.1% from two or more races. About 5.5% (17,959) of the population was Hispanic or Latino of any race.

The largest ancestry groups in Henrico County are: Black or African American (25%), English American (14%), German (11%), Irish (10%) and Italian (4%)

In 2000, of the 108,121 households, 31.9% had children under 18 living with them, 48.3% were married couples living together, 13.1% had a female householder with no husband present, and 35.4% were not families. About 28.9% of all households were made up of individuals, and 8.5% had someone living alone who was 65 or older. The average household size was 2.39, and the average family size was 2.97.

In the county, the age distribution was 25.1% under 19, 7.80% from 19 to 24, 27.7% from 25 to 44, 25.9% from 45 to 64, and 14.6% who were 65 or older. The median age was 38.5 years. For every 100 females. there were 90.1 males. For every 100 females 18 and over, there were 83.6 males.

In 2019, the median income in the county for a household was $68,024 and for a family was $91,956. The per capita income for the county was $40,222, with 9% of the population below the poverty line.

== Government and politics ==
United States presidential election results for Henrico County, Virginia
Year	Republican		Democratic		Third party(ies)	
Year	No.	%	No.	%	No.	%
1880	1,032	46.65%	1,180	53.35%	0	0.00%
1884	2,174	55.25%	1,755	44.60%	6	0.15%
1888	2,326	57.60%	1,712	42.40%	0	0.00%
1892	1,849	42.43%	2,374	54.47%	135	3.10%
1896	1,817	43.16%	2,332	55.39%	61	1.45%
1900	1,049	31.87%	2,189	66.51%	53	1.61%
1904	248	21.25%	890	76.26%	29	2.49%
1908	215	25.41%	627	74.11%	4	0.47%
1912	93	7.91%	952	81.02%	130	11.06%
1916	140	16.47%	690	81.18%	20	2.35%
1920	338	23.26%	1,078	74.19%	37	2.55%
1924	416	25.92%	1,052	65.55%	137	8.54%
1928	1,887	58.31%	1,349	41.69%	0	0.00%
1932	1,291	33.32%	2,458	63.43%	126	3.25%
1936	1,285	26.12%	3,610	73.39%	24	0.49%
1940	2,005	33.27%	3,993	66.25%	29	0.48%
1944	1,263	29.16%	3,056	70.56%	12	0.28%
1948	2,092	42.09%	2,321	46.70%	557	11.21%
1952	10,682	66.62%	5,339	33.30%	14	0.09%
1956	12,702	60.20%	5,032	23.85%	3,367	15.96%
1960	19,446	66.52%	9,626	32.93%	163	0.56%
1964	29,286	69.59%	12,779	30.37%	17	0.04%
1968	34,212	62.52%	8,600	15.71%	11,914	21.77%
1972	52,536	84.87%	8,420	13.60%	948	1.53%
1976	45,405	65.82%	21,729	31.50%	1,847	2.68%
1980	50,505	66.85%	21,023	27.83%	4,023	5.32%
1984	63,864	74.74%	21,336	24.97%	248	0.29%
1988	62,284	69.29%	26,980	30.02%	623	0.69%
1992	56,910	52.27%	36,807	33.81%	15,151	13.92%
1996	54,430	53.37%	41,121	40.32%	6,441	6.32%
2000	62,887	55.04%	48,645	42.58%	2,720	2.38%
2004	71,809	53.82%	60,864	45.62%	745	0.56%
2008	67,381	43.48%	86,323	55.70%	1,262	0.81%
2012	70,449	43.42%	89,594	55.22%	2,198	1.35%
2016	59,857	36.58%	93,935	57.40%	9,862	6.03%
2020	63,440	34.64%	116,572	63.65%	3,140	1.71%
2024	62,882	34.65%	115,040	63.39%	3,567	1.97%

Henrico County is managed by an appointed county manager who answers directly to the board of supervisors. The current county manager is John A. Vithoulkas.

The Board of Supervisors are:

- Brookland District – Dan Schmitt (R)
- Fairfield District – Roscoe Cooper III (D)
- Three Chopt District – Misty Whitehead (D)
- Tuckahoe District – Jody Rogish (D)
- Varina District – Tyrone E. Nelson (D)

In 2014, Henrico County won Best in Government from Richmond Magazine.

The elected constitutional officers include:

- Clerk of the Circuit Court – Heidi S. Barshinger (R)
- Commonwealth's Attorney – Shannon Taylor (D)
- Sheriff – Alisa Gregory (D)

The county also has several legislative representatives.

In the U.S. House of Representatives:

- Republican Rob Wittman
- Democrat Jennifer McClellan

In the Virginia Senate:

- Democrat Lamont Bagby
- Republican John McGuire
- Democrat Lashrecse Aird
- Democrat Schuyler VanValkenburg

In the Virginia House of Delegates:

- Democrat May Nivar
- Democrat Rodney Willett
- Republican Buddy Fowler
- Democrat Destiny LeVere Bolling
- Democrat Delores McQuinn

=== National politics ===
From the 1950s until the early 2000s, Henrico County was solidly Republican in presidential elections and was considered a classic bastion of suburban conservatism. However, Barack Obama won the county in 2008, becoming the first Democrat to do so since Harry Truman in 1948, and it has voted for the Democratic nominee in every subsequent presidential election. Mirroring the shift towards Democrats seen in many affluent suburban counties across the country, Joe Biden won Henrico County by nearly 30 points in 2020.

=== Law enforcement ===
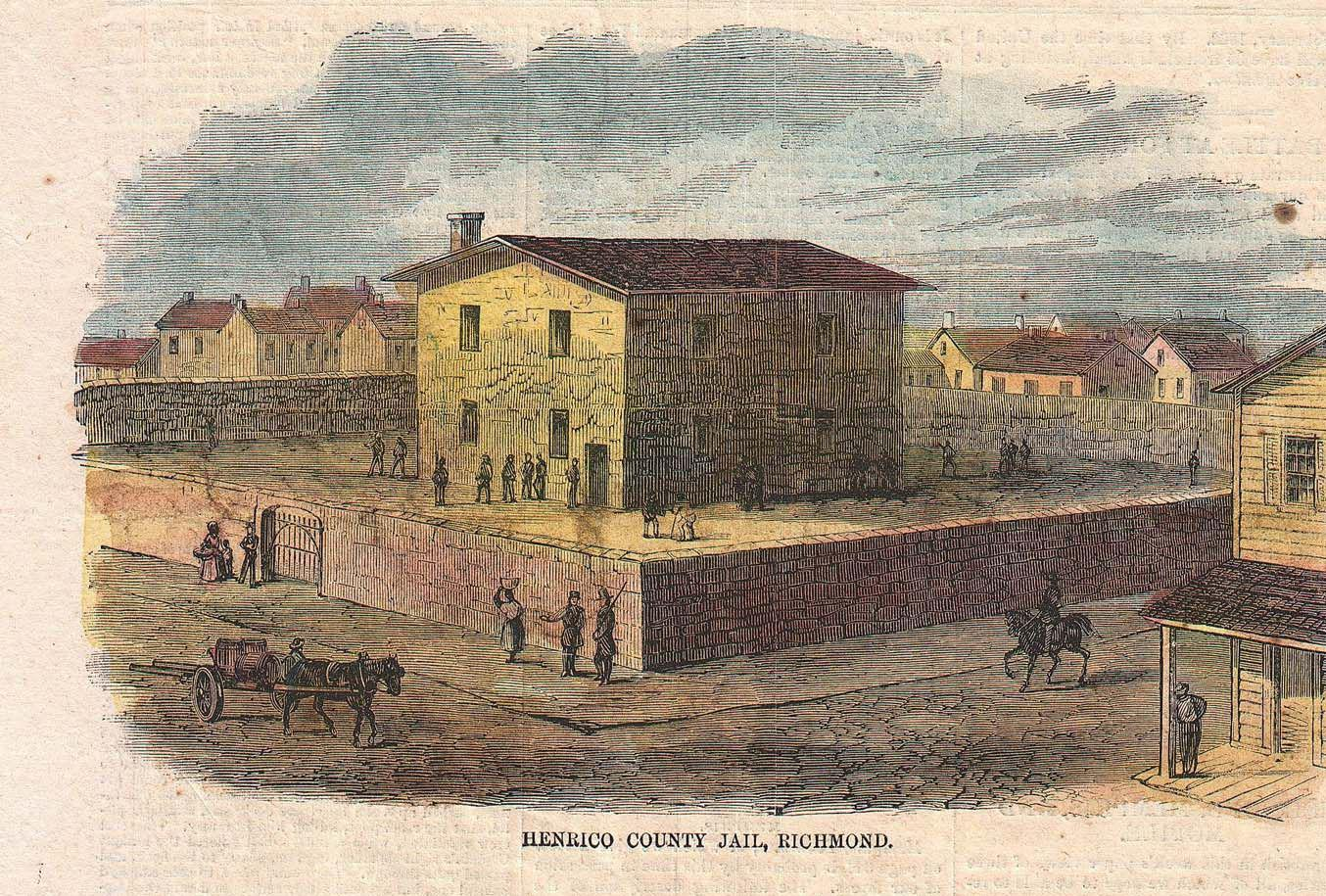
Henrico County Jail, circa 1861

The Henrico County Sheriff's Office and Henrico County Police are Henrico County's county-level law enforcement agencies. Thomas Dale led the county militia and was the first law enforcement officer in the county: the sheriff's department considers him the first sheriff of Henrico County. The county police were founded in 1915. In 1938, the board of supervisors put the police under the direct control of the county manager, rather than under the sheriff.

The elected Sheriff's primary duties are managing the jail, court security, and the service of civil process. In 1880, the first courthouse and jail was constructed and housed the Sheriff's Office and Jail until 1980. In 1980, in the need for a more technological advanced and more spacious area, the Jail West at the Henrico County Government Complex was constructed. In 1996, Henrico's Sheriff's Office opened Jail East in New Kent County.

The Henrico County Police Division is fully accredited by the Commission for Accreditation of Law Enforcement Agencies and Virginia Law Enforcement Professional Standards Commission.

=== Fire and EMS ===
The Division of Fire is responsible for fire suppression, emergency medical services, hazardous materials response, technical rescue, water rescue, fire prevention, fire investigation, public education, disaster preparedness and emergency management. The Henrico County Fire Department includes 548 members, of whom 526 are sworn firefighters. The division operates 68 fire apparatus at 20 community fire stations. The division is rated ISO class 1.

Additionally, the department encompasses several specialized units, including a Water Rescue Team, Technical Rescue Team, Hazardous Incident Team, and special events resources. In 2014, the Division of Fire responded to 41,759 emergency incidents.

The department was awarded the 2024 Governor's Fire Service Award by Glenn Youngkin, who, in a press release, praised it for its work in training and regional partnerships, particularly in supporting statewide training events.

Henrico County residents are served by the Henrico Area Mental Health and Developmental Services, which has a CARF three-year accreditation.

== Economy ==
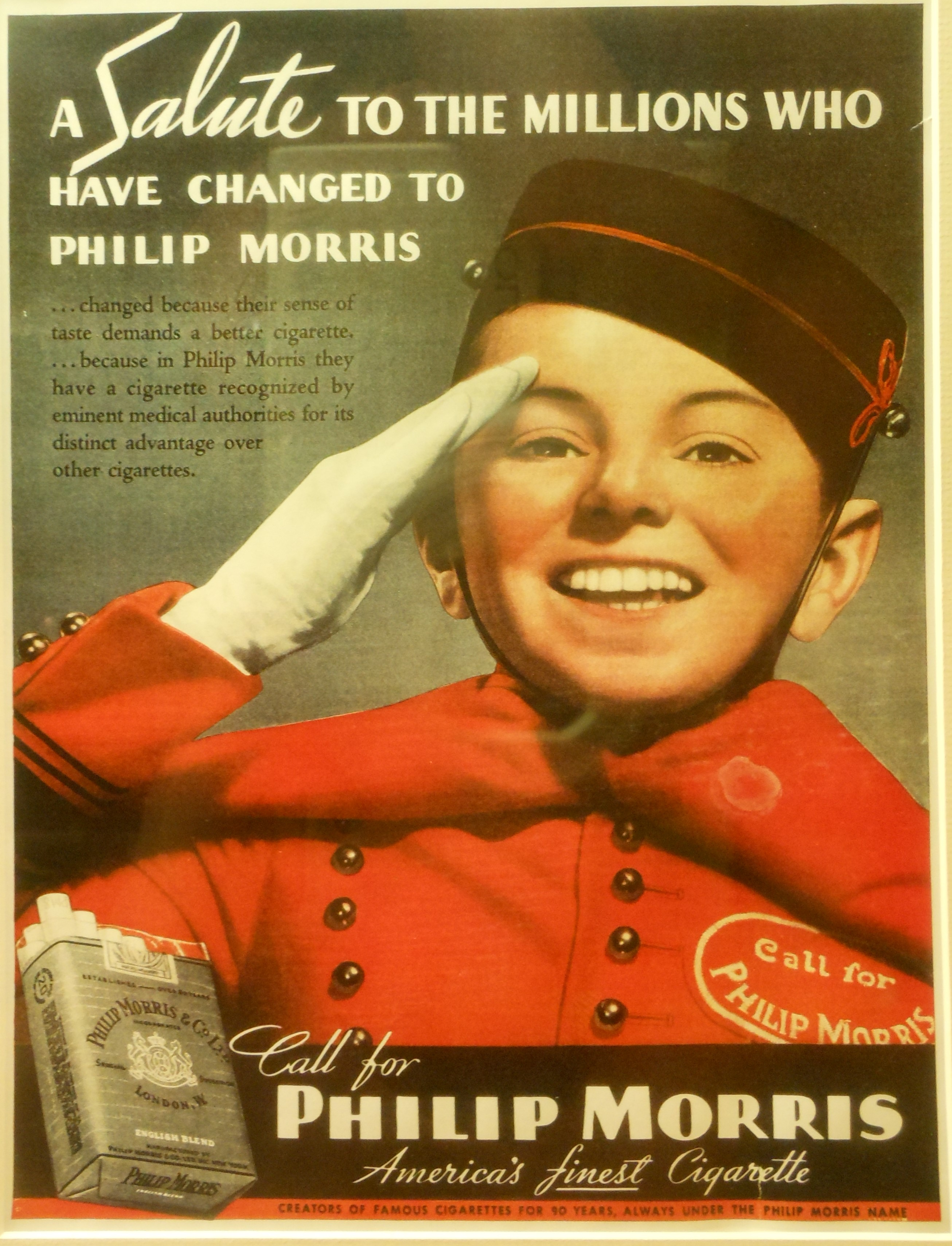
An advertisement for Philip Morris, now known as Altria, which is headquartered in Henrico.

Altria Group (formerly Philip Morris) had its corporate headquarters in an unincorporated area in Henrico County. In 2003, Philip Morris announced that it would move its headquarters from New York City to Virginia. The company said that it planned to keep around 750 employees in its former headquarters. Brendan McCormick, a spokesperson for Philip Morris, said that the company estimated that the move would save the company over $60 million each year. This relocation was made with the help of the Henrico County Economic Development Authority and the Greater Richmond Partnership, regional economic development organizations who also helped locate Aditya Birla Minacs, Alfa Laval, Genworth Financial, and Blue Bell Creameries to the county. It is also a major hub for data centers in Virginia.

=== Top employers ===
According to the county's 2014 Comprehensive Annual Financial Report, the top employers in the county are:

#	Employer	# of employees	Community
1	Henrico County Public Schools (Henrico County government)	5,000–9,999	
2	Capital One	5,000–9,999	
3	Henrico County government	1,000–4,999	Laurel
4	Henrico Doctors' Hospital	1,000–4,999	
5	Anthem	1,000–4,999	
6	Bank of America	1,000–4,999	
7	Wells Fargo	1,000–4,999	Innsbrook
8	Walmart	1,000–4,999	
9	United States Postal Service (The US Government)	1,000–4,999	Sandston
10	Genworth Financial	1,000–4,999	
11	Kroger	1,000–4,999	
12	SunTrust Banks	500–999	
13	Apex Systems	500–999	
14	Markel	500–999	
15	Virginia Department of Social Services (Commonwealth of Virginia Government)	500–999	
16	Dominion Resources	500–999	
17	Verizon Virginia	500–999	
18	J. Sargeant Reynolds Community College	500–999	
19	EAB (company)	500–999	

For many years, the United States Postal Service considered most of Henrico County to be unincorporated Richmond, and the majority of locations in the county had a Richmond address. However, in 2008 county residents won the right to recognize Henrico County as the locality to which they pay the majority of their taxes. As of October 1, 2008, the primary mailing address for the majority of the county was officially changed to Henrico. It was estimated that the county would recover $5 million in misdirected tax dollars due to the address change.

Lewis Ginter Botanical Garden was founded in 1984 and has 80 acres (320,000 m^{2}). It is one of only two independent public botanical gardens in Virginia, and designated a state botanical garden.

Henrico County is the location of Richmond Raceway, which is home to NASCAR Cup Series races once a year.

== Education ==
The school division known as Henrico County Public Schools consists of 45 elementary schools, 13 middle schools, 10 high schools and two technical centers within one school division. In 2001, HCPS began distributing Apple iBooks to every high school student. In 2003, they extended the program to middle schools. In 2005, the HCPS School Board decided to replace the iBooks with Dell's Inspiron 600M at the high school level. In 2006, the HCPS School Board decided to continue using Apple iBooks at the middle school level, purchasing nearly 13,000 laptops in a contract worth $15.8 million. In 2010, HCPS School Board opened a new middle school, Holman Middle School, and opened a new high school, Glen Allen High School.

== Communities ==
There are no existing incorporated towns, and no new municipalities can be created within the county. Henrico was the third Virginia county (after Arlington and Fairfax counties) to be affected by a state law that prohibits the creation of any new towns or cities within the boundaries of a county with a population density of 1,000 or more per square mile.

=== Census-designated places ===
- Chamberlayne
- Dumbarton
- East Highland Park
- Glen Allen
- Highland Springs
- Innsbrook
- Lakeside
- Laurel
- Montrose
- Sandston
- Short Pump
- Tuckahoe
- Wyndham

=== Other communities ===
- Fair Oaks
- Varina

=== Former towns ===
Prior to 1870, the Town and later City of Richmond was located within Henrico County. Under a new Virginia state constitution in 1870, and as further clarified by the rewritten one in 1902, Richmond became an independent city.

At the end of the 19th century and in the early 20th century, several small incorporated towns were chartered by Acts of Assembly, primarily in areas of the county near to, but outside of, the city limits. As listed by the secretary of the Commonwealth, these included:

- Barton Heights, incorporated 1896, annexed by the City of Richmond in 1914
- Fairmount, incorporated 1902, annexed by the City of Richmond in 1914
- Ginter Park, annexed by the City of Richmond
- Highland Park, annexed by the City of Richmond in 1914
- North Richmond, annexed by the City of Richmond

== Notable people ==
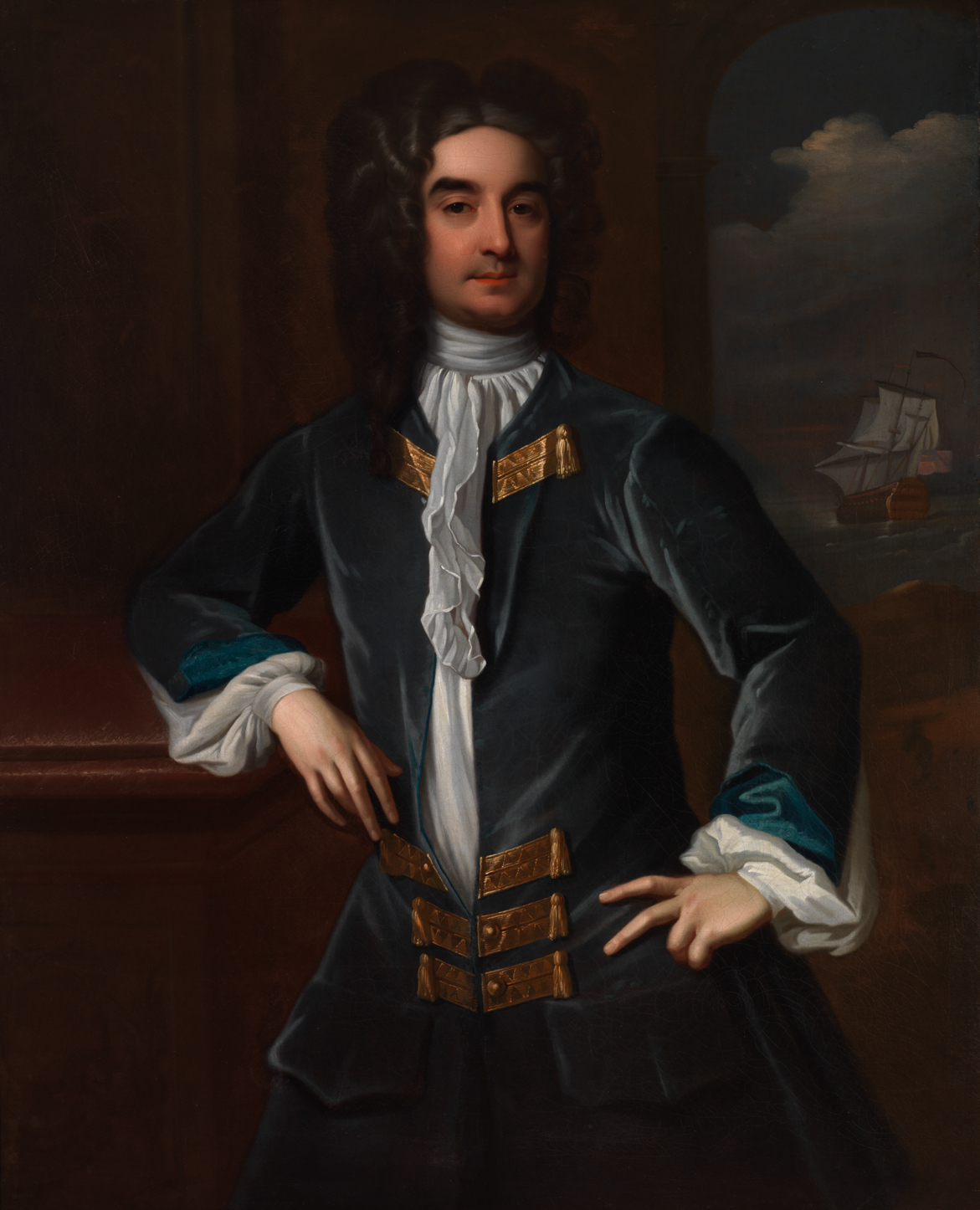
William Byrd II, the founder of Richmond, was born in Henrico.

- Van T. Barfoot, Medal of Honor recipient
- Carter Family, folk and country music group
- Georgia May Jobson, social reformer
- Daniel Lynch IV, baseball player
- Debbie Matenopoulos, television personality
- Gabriel Prosser, Revolutionary
- Schuyler VanValkenburg, State Senator
- Constance Wu, actress

== See also ==
- Henrico Citizen
- Henrico County Public Schools
- National Register of Historic Places listings in Henrico County, Virginia
- Henrico County Public Library
