= National Register of Historic Places listings in Henrico County, Virginia =

Location of Henrico County in Virginia

Henrico County, Virginia, United States, has 36 properties and districts listed on the National Register of Historic Places, including one National Historic Landmark. The locations of National Register properties and districts for which the latitude and longitude coordinates are included below, may be seen in an online map.

This National Park Service list is complete through NPS recent listings posted June 26, 2026.

== Current listings ==
	Name on the Register	Image	Date listed	Location	City or town	Description
1	Beth Elon	Beth Elon	May 22, 2003 (#03000446)	4600 Nine Mile Rd. 37°32′42″N 77°22′27″W	Richmond	A simplified Queen Anne style house from 1890, that was home of Leslie and Laura Watson, musicians and music teachers in the Richmond area
2	Brook Road Marker, Jefferson Davis Highway	Brook Road Marker, Jefferson Davis Highway	July 24, 2007 (#07000765)	0.2 mi (0.32 km) east of the junction of Hilliard and Brook Rds. 37°36′51″N 77°27′25″W	Richmond	A marker for the Jefferson Davis Highway, conceived and marked by the United Daughters of the Confederacy, as a counter to the Lincoln Highway in the north, during 1913-1925 in an era of named highway promotion, before numbered U.S. highways were created.
3	Chatsworth School	Chatsworth School	June 1, 2022 (#100007781)	1451 Chatsworth Rd. 37°28′57″N 77°23′33″W	Henrico	
4	Clarke-Palmore House	Clarke-Palmore House	June 2, 2004 (#04000576)	904 McCoul St. 37°30′19″N 77°24′25″W	Richmond	Brick house built as a farmhouse in 1819 and expanded in 1855; "a reminder of Henrico County's agricultural past."
5	Curles Neck Farm	Curles Neck Farm	December 22, 2009 (#09001222)	4705 Curles Neck Rd. 37°23′21″N 77°17′20″W	Henrico	Plantation operated continuously as a working farm since 1635. One of the great James River Plantations. Incidentally, site of an airliner's crash-landing in 1951. Plantation house and 156 acres (0.63 km^{2}) are NRHP-listed.
6	Dabbs House	Dabbs House	March 18, 2020 (#100005104)	3812 Nine Mile Rd. 37°32′37″N 77°22′59″W	Henrico	
7	Druin-Horner House	Druin-Horner House	February 25, 2009 (#09000064)	9904 River Rd. 37°35′11″N 77°36′39″W	Richmond	
8	Edge Hill	Edge Hill	March 27, 2008 (#08000243)	1107 Greenview Dr. 37°30′05″N 77°24′12″W	Richmond	
9	Emek Sholom Holocaust Memorial Cemetery	Emek Sholom Holocaust Memorial Cemetery	February 10, 1999 (#99000072)	4000 Pilots Ln. 37°35′33″N 77°26′14″W	Richmond	
10	Emmanuel Church at Brook Hill	Emmanuel Church at Brook Hill	February 3, 2000 (#99001720)	1214 Wilmer Ave. 37°36′22″N 77°27′30″W	Henrico	A "superb example of late antebellum Gothic Revival ecclesiastical architecture", designed by Rhode Island architect Clifton A. Hall.
11	Farmer's Rest	Farmer's Rest	February 13, 2015 (#15000015)	9341 Varina Rd. 37°24′32″N 77°21′13″W	Henrico	
12	Flood Marker of 1771	Flood Marker of 1771	September 22, 1971 (#71000981)	0.8 mi (1.3 km) southeast of the junction of State Routes 5 and 156; 37°23′44″N 77°15′25″W	Richmond	
13	Fort Harrison National Cemetery	Fort Harrison National Cemetery	August 10, 1995 (#95000921)	8620 Varina Rd. 37°25′42″N 77°22′00″W	Richmond	
14	Glendale National Cemetery	Glendale National Cemetery	February 26, 1996 (#96000026)	State Route 156, 1 mi (1.6 km) south of its junction with Darbytown Rd. 37°26′09″N 77°14′05″W	Providence Forge	
15	Henrico Theatre	Henrico Theatre	November 9, 2005 (#05001226)	305 E. Nine Mile Rd. 37°32′37″N 77°19′32″W	Highland Springs	An Art Deco style building from 1938.
16	Highland Springs Historic District	Highland Springs Historic District	May 11, 2018 (#100002440)	W. and E. Nine Mile Rd. and N. and S. Holly Ave. 37°32′46″N 77°19′40″W	Highland Springs	
17	Indian Springs Farm Site 44HE1065		December 12, 2024 (#100011146)	Address Restricted	Sandston vicinity	
18	James River and Kanawha Canal Historic District	James River and Kanawha Canal Historic District	August 26, 1971 (#71000982)	Extends from Ship Locks to Bosher's Dam; 37°33′40″N 77°34′32″W	Richmond	
19	James River Steam Brewery Cellars	James River Steam Brewery Cellars	February 5, 2014 (#13001162)	4920 Old Main St. 37°30′57″N 77°24′57″W	Richmond	
20	Laurel Industrial School Historic District	Laurel Industrial School Historic District	June 12, 1987 (#87001149)	Northern and southern sides of Hungary Rd., west of Old Staples Mill Rd. 37°38′37″N 77°30′33″W	Laurel	
21	Malvern Hill	Malvern Hill	November 12, 1969 (#69000248)	Southeast of the junction of State Routes 5 and 156; 37°23′50″N 77°14′49″W	Richmond	Site of bloody Battle of Malvern Hill on July 1, 1862. Cruciform-plan house built in 1600s, burned in 1905. Ruins, including end gables and chimney still "perhaps the finest example of seventeenth century diaper brickwork in the state."
22	Mankin Mansion	Mankin Mansion	October 14, 1993 (#93001124)	4300 Oakleys Ln. 37°32′12″N 77°20′49″W	Richmond	
23	The Markel Building	The Markel Building	May 8, 2017 (#100000984)	5310 Markel Rd. 37°35′04″N 77°29′58″W	Richmond	
24	Meadow Farm	Meadow Farm	August 13, 1974 (#74002125)	Mountain and Courtney Rds. 37°40′42″N 77°31′02″W	Glen Allen	
25	Virginia Randolph Cottage	Virginia Randolph Cottage	December 2, 1974 (#74002126)	2200 Mountain Rd. 37°39′40″N 77°28′54″W	Glen Allen	Home economics building of the Virginia Randolph Training School, a vocational school, where Virginia E. Randolph (1874–1958), who was a black woman, was a teacher and a teacher educator for 55 years. Now a museum commemorating her life. Her gravesite is on the grounds.
26	Redesdale	Redesdale	February 21, 2008 (#08000071)	8603 River Rd. 37°33′56″N 77°33′44″W	Richmond	
27	Reynolds Metals Company International Headquarters	Reynolds Metals Company International Headquarters	April 26, 2000 (#00000064)	6601 W. Broad St. 37°36′01″N 77°31′00″W	Richmond	International Style building complex set in a composed landscape, completed in 1958, cited as a prototype for modern suburban office development, and featuring aluminum inside and out.
28	Richmond National Cemetery	Richmond National Cemetery	October 26, 1995 (#95001183)	1701 Williamsburg Rd. 37°30′52″N 77°23′35″W	Richmond	
29	Rocky Mills	Rocky Mills	May 13, 2002 (#02000513)	211 Ross Rd. 37°33′57″N 77°33′13″W	Richmond	
30	Sandston Historic District	Sandston Historic District	December 7, 2021 (#100007215)	Roughly bounded by Williamsburg Rd., Raines Ave., Berry St., Confederate and Jackson Aves., McClellan St., East Nine Mile Rd., and Garland Ave. 37°31′17″N 77°18′26″W	Sandston	
31	Seven Pines National Cemetery	Seven Pines National Cemetery	October 26, 1995 (#95001182)	400 E. Williamsburg Rd. 37°31′13″N 77°18′07″W	Sandston	
32	Tree Hill	Tree Hill	October 17, 1974 (#74002127)	State Route 5; 37°29′31″N 77°24′42″W	Richmond	
33	Varina Plantation	Varina Plantation	April 29, 1977 (#77001489)	Varina Rd. 37°22′54″N 77°20′09″W	Varina	
34	Walkerton	Walkerton	December 6, 1984 (#84000676)	Mountain Rd. 37°39′54″N 77°29′37″W	Glen Allen	
35	Woodland Cemetery		January 16, 2026 (#100012560)	2300-A Magnolia Road; 37°33′42″N 77°24′48″W	Richmond vicinity	
36	Woodside	Woodside	July 24, 1973 (#73002021)	Southwest of Tuckahoe off State Route 157; 37°34′20″N 77°37′08″W	Tuckahoe	A Greek Revival villa built in 1858, the countryside home of the Wickham family of Richmond.

== See also ==
- List of National Historic Landmarks in Virginia
- National Register of Historic Places listings in Virginia
- National Register of Historic Places listings in Richmond, Virginia
