= Charles Gillette =

American architect

- Born: March 14, 1886; Chippewa Falls, Wisconsin
- Died: March 30, 1969 (aged 83); Richmond, Virginia
- Occupation: Architect
- Spouse: Ellen Patterson Cogwell (m. 1912; died 1967)
- Projects: University of Richmond, Reynolds Metals Company International Headquarters

Charles Freeman Gillette (March 14, 1886 – March 30, 1969) was a prominent landscape architect in the upper South who specialized in the creation of grounds supporting Colonial Revival architecture, particularly in Richmond, Virginia. He is associated with the restoration and re-creation of historic gardens in the upper South and especially Virginia. He is known for having established a regional style—known as the "Virginia Garden."

== Biography ==
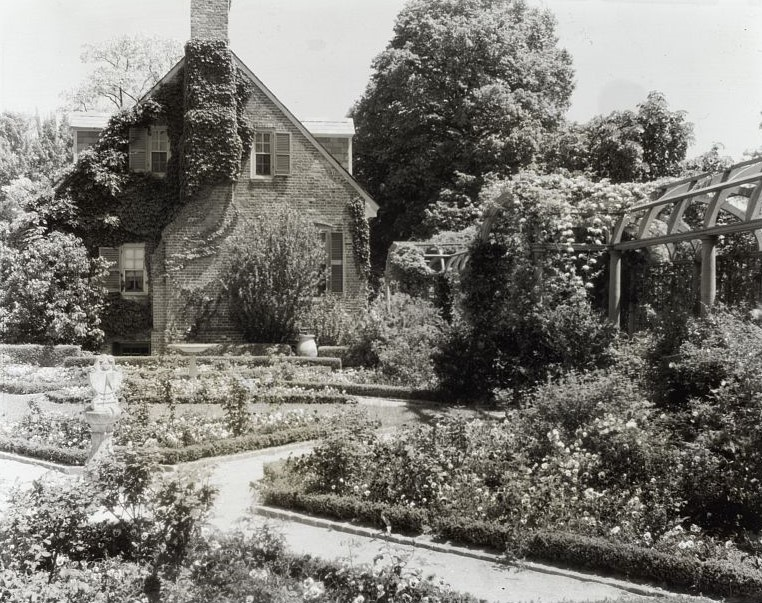
"York Hall," Captain George Preston Blow House, Route 1005 and Main Street, Yorktown, by Frances Benjamin Johnston, 1929. Griffin & Wynkoop, architects, additions to 18th century brick house, the home of Thomas Nelson Jr., 1738–1739, after purchase by Blow in 1914. Landscape: Charles Freeman Gillette, from 1914. Today the house, without additions by Captain Blow, is a National Park Service site

Charles F. Gillette was born in Chippewa Falls, Wisconsin, in 1886 as the tenth and final child of Orlando and Catherine Gillette (nee Melville). His father served as a private in the 30th Wisconsin Infantry Regiment in the Union Army during the Civil War. Due to his family's financial state, Gillette never had any formal schooling.

In 1909–1911, Gillette served as an apprentice in the Boston office of Warren H. Manning, a leading early-20th century landscape architect. Gillette moved to Richmond in 1913 to supervise the completion of Manning's landscape design for the University of Richmond's new campus. In 1915, he began designing the grounds of the Nelson House in Yorktown, Virginia. In 1924, he commenced work on the landscape restoration of Kenmore in Fredericksburg, Virginia. A few years later, he initiated plans for the landscaping of Virginia House and Agecroft, both reconstructed English manor houses located in Richmond's Windsor Farms neighborhood. Extensive additions to the Virginia House gardens were completed in 1939. During the 1950s, Gillette redesigned the gardens of Virginia's Executive Mansion at the request of Governor Thomas B. Stanley. In 1958, he designed the grounds for the Reynolds Metals Company International Headquarters located at Richmond. His commissions also included hundreds of residential projects throughout Virginia and North Carolina.

A number of his works were designed for properties listed on the National Register of Historic Places.

== In popular culture ==
Author Tom Wolfe references Gillette as the commissioned landscaper of Dupont University in I Am Charlotte Simmons.

== Selected works ==
- University of Richmond (1913), Richmond, VA
- Nelson House (1915), Yorktown, Virginia
- Casa Maria (1921-1922), Greenwood, VA
- Blue Ridge Farm (1923-1924), Greenwood, VA
- Sunken Garden (Virginia) (1923-1924), Williamsburg, Virginia
- Kenmore (1924), Fredericksburg, Virginia
- Agecroft Hall (1926), Richmond, VA
- MacCallum More and Hudgins House Historic District gardens (1927), Chase City, Virginia
- Belfield (1929-1930), Lexington, Virginia
- Gallison Hall (1931-1933), Charlottesville, VA
- Windemere (1860), Richmond, VA
- Midway (Millington, Virginia) (1936), Millington, VA
- Reynolds Metals Company International Headquarters (1958), Richmond, VA
- Lewis Ginter Botanical Garden, Richmond, VA
- Glen Alpine in the Cifax Rural Historic District, Cifax, Virginia
- Oak Grove (Eastville, Virginia), Eastville, VA
- E. Hervey Evans House (1939), Laurinburg, NC
- Monroe Ward, Richmond, VA
- John Whitworth House, Richmond, VA
- Longview Gardens Historic District
- Meadowbrook
- Virginia House, 1927
- Elderslie, 1917
- 4300 Sulgrave Road, 1957
- Executive Mansion (Virginia), 1954
- Nordley (4203 Sulgrave Road), 1924
- Redesdale, 1925
- Little Yatton, Orange County, 1948
- Meadowfarm, Orange County, 1934
