= Walkerton =

Walkerton may refer to:

- Walkerton, Ontario, a town in Canada
  - The Walkerton Hawks, a Canadian ice hockey team
  - The Walkerton Capitals, a Canadian ice hockey team
  - The Walkerton E. coli outbreak, involving the contamination of the town water supply in 2000
- Walkerton, Indiana, a town in the state of Indiana in the United States
- Walkerton, Virginia, a village in the state of Virginia in the United States
  - The Battle of Walkerton, which took place in Virginia during the American Civil War
- Walkerton (Glen Allen, Virginia), a historic tavern building
