= Gallison =

Gallison is a surname. Notable people with the surname include:

- Joseph Gallison (fl. 1961–1991), American actor
- Raymond Gallison (born 1952), American politician

== See also ==
- Galison, another surname
- Gallison Hall
- Gallison Memorial Library
