= Longview Gardens Historic District =

Historic house in North Carolina, United States

- U.S. National Register of Historic Places
- U.S. Historic district
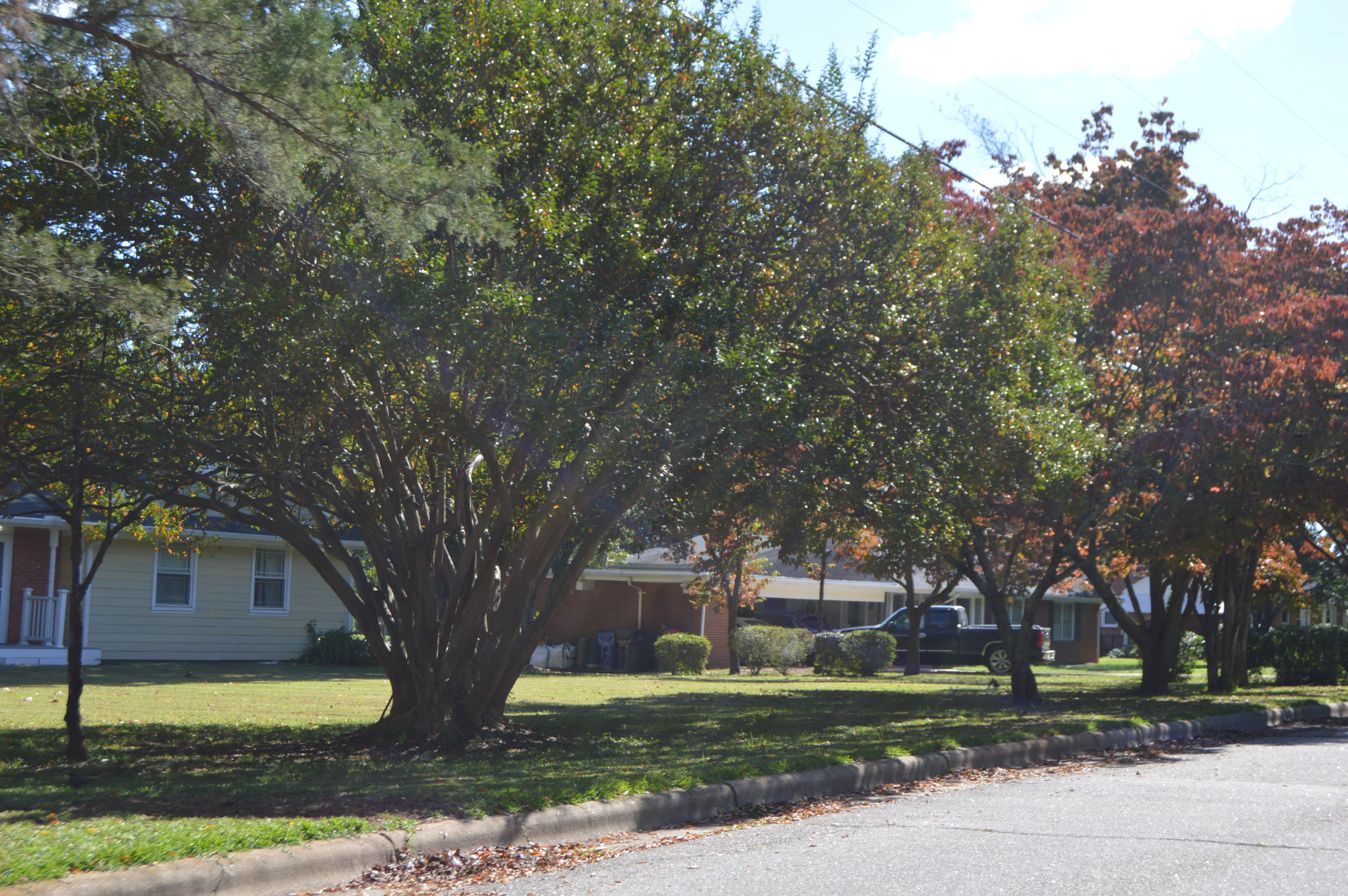
- Lord Berkley Road

- Location within North Carolina Location within the United States
- Location: Bounded roughly by King Charles Rd, Poole Rd, Donald Ross Dr, Albemarle Ave, Longview Lake Dr, and New Bern Ave,, Raleigh, North Carolina
- Coordinates: 35°46′37″N 78°35′50″W
- Area: 350 acres (140 ha)
- Built: 1938-1965
- Architect: Thomas Cooper, William H. Deitrick, Charles Gillette, Lewis Polier, James Salter
- Architectural style: Ranch, Split Level, Colonial Revival, Tudor Revival
- MPS: Post-World War II and Modern Architecture in Raleigh, North Carolina, 1945-1965
- NRHP reference No.: 10001113
- Added to NRHP: January 3, 2011

Longview Gardens Historic District is a historic post-World War II neighborhood and national historic district located 1 1/2 miles east of downtown Raleigh, North Carolina. The district encompasses 189 contributing buildings and five contributing sites. Notable contributing resources include the Raleigh Country Club golf course designed by Donald Ross, Longview Baptist Church (c. 1955) and Milner Memorial Presbyterian Church (1946), both striking examples of Modernist architecture.

Developed from 1938 to 1965 by Clarence Poe, the longtime editor of The Progressive Farmer, Longview Gardens was designed by Richmond, Virginia landscape architect Charles Gillette. A student of the City Beautiful movement, Gillette's design for Longview Gardens consisted of a pattern of curvilinear streets on both sides of a designed parkway.

The Longview Gardens neighborhood grew over a series of three separate phases: 1938–1940, 1948-1948, and 1959. Accordingly, its architectural styles reflect this progression, with the earliest homes constructed in the Colonial Revival and Tudor Revival styles popular before World War II and the later homes constructed in the Ranch and Split-level home styles.

Longview Gardens is the largest and most artistically designed mid-20th century subdivision in Raleigh and remains largely intact today.

It was listed on the National Register of Historic Places in January 2011.
