= Oak Grove (Eastville, Virginia) =

Historic house in Virginia, United States

- U.S. National Register of Historic Places
- Virginia Landmarks Register
- Location within Virginia Location within the United States
- Location: VA 630 north side, 1 mile (1.6 km) west of the junction with US 13, near Eastville, Virginia
- Coordinates: 37°22′48″N 75°57′23″W
- Area: 171.6 acres (69.4 ha)
- Built: c. 1750, c. 1811, c. 1840
- Architect: Gillette, Charles
- Architectural style: Greek Revival, Federal, Postmedieval English
- NRHP reference No.: 93000006
- VLR No.: 065-0019

Significant dates
- Added to NRHP: February 4, 1993
- Designated VLR: December 9, 1992

Oak Grove is a historic plantation house located near Eastville, Northampton County, Virginia. The original section of the manor house was built about 1750, and is a 1 1/2-story, gambrel-roofed colonial-period structure. It has a two-story Federal style wing added about 1811, and a two-story Greek Revival style wing added about 1840. The house was remodeled and enlarged in the 1940s. Also on the property are the contributing five early outbuildings, three 20th-century farm buildings, and a well tended formal garden designed by the Richmond landscape architect Charles Gillette.

It was listed on the National Register of Historic Places in 1993.
