= Farmer's Rest =

Historic house in Virginia, United States

- U.S. National Register of Historic Places
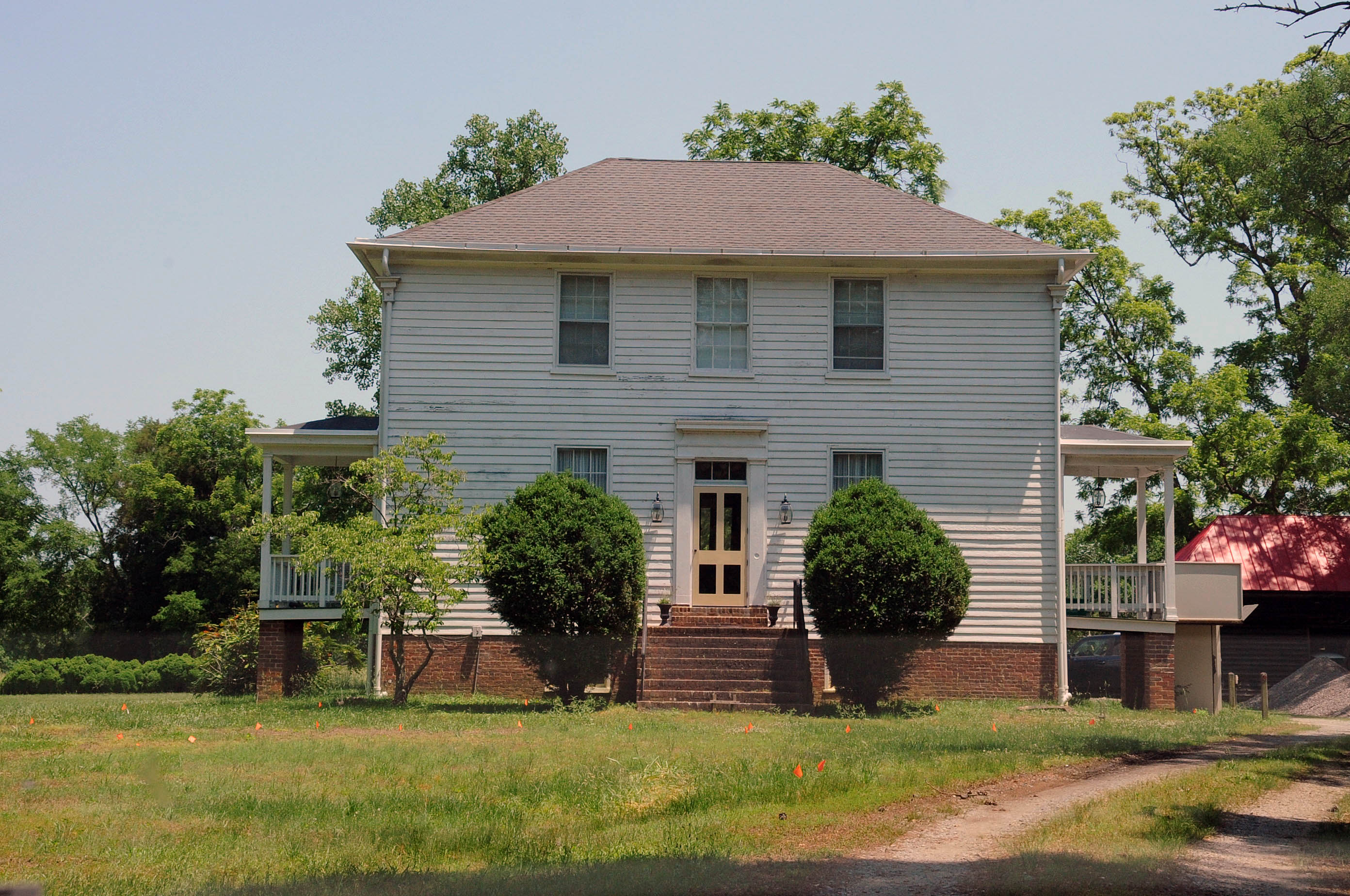

- Location within Virginia Location within the United States
- Location: 9341 Varina Rd., near Henrico, Virginia
- Coordinates: 37°24′32″N 77°21′13″W
- Area: 26 acres (11 ha)
- Architectural style: Greek Revival
- NRHP reference No.: 15000015
- Added to NRHP: February 13, 2015

Farmer's Rest is a historic plantation property at 9341 Varina Road in Henrico County, Virginia. The 26-acre (11 ha) property's farm complex includes a brick Greek Revival house, a smokehouse/workshop, chicken coop, and barn. Other resources include the family cemetery of the Bullington family, early owners of the land, and the extensive archaeological remains of a former slave quarters. The main house is a well-preserved example of Greek Revival architecture, having retained much of its interior woodwork, flooring and plaster.

The property was listed on the National Register of Historic Places in 1974.

== See also ==
- National Register of Historic Places listings in Henrico County, Virginia
