= Galison =

Galison is a surname. Notable people with the surname include:

- Peter Galison (born 1955), American historian and philosopher of science
- William Galison (born 1958), American harmonica player

== See also ==
- Gallison, another surname
- Galison, a stationery and gifts publisher owned by the McEvoy Group
