= James River Steam Brewery Cellars =

- U.S. National Register of Historic Places
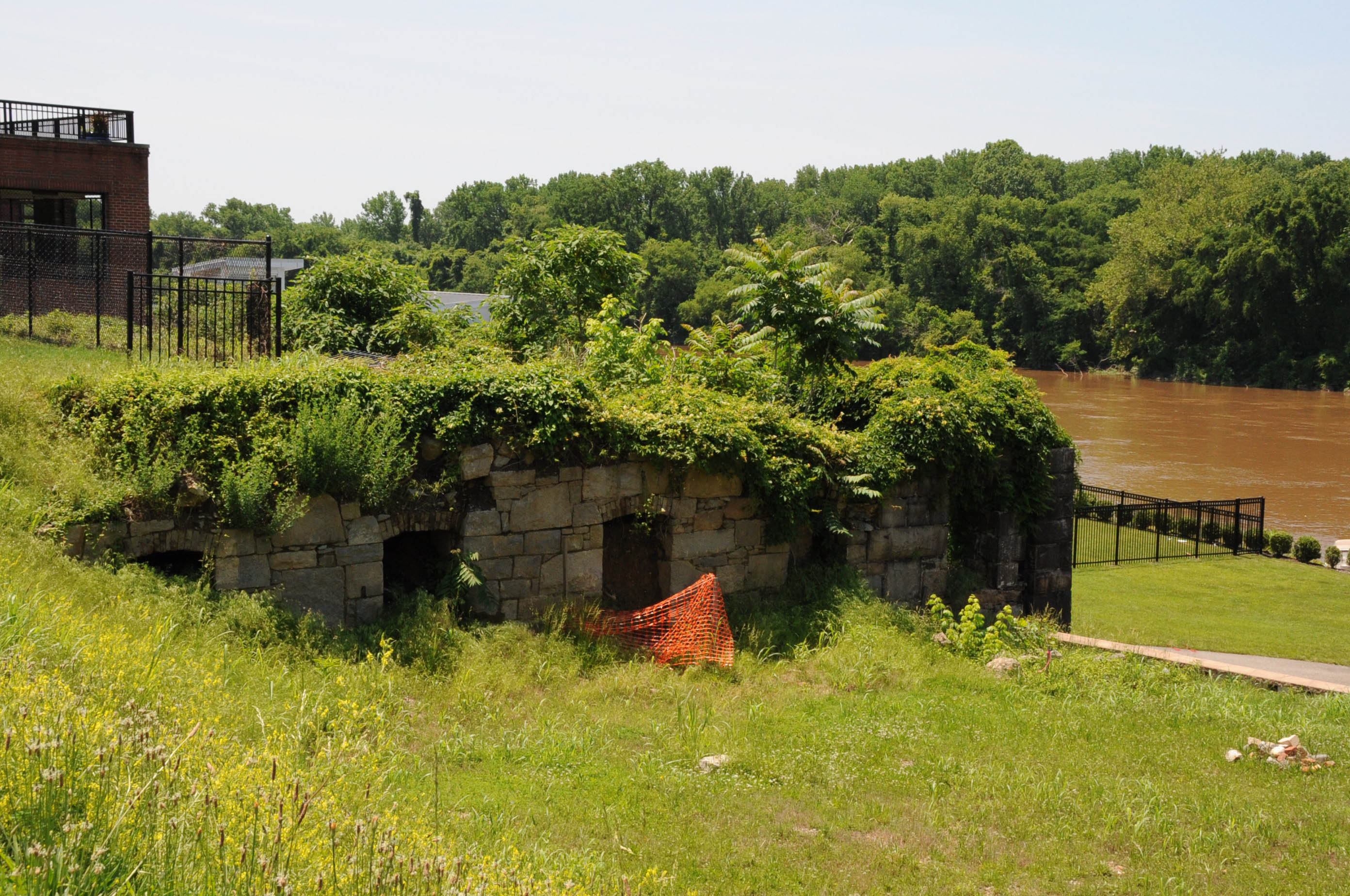

- Location within Virginia Location within the United States
- Nearest city: 4920 Old Main Street, Richmond, Virginia
- Coordinates: 37°30′58″N 77°24′57″W
- Area: 0 acres (0 ha)
- NRHP reference No.: 13001162
- Added to NRHP: February 5, 2014

The James River Steam Brewery Cellars are a historic series of brewery-related tunnels near the Rocketts Landing development on the James River in Henrico County, Virginia. The stone-lined barrel-vaulted tunnels were built c. 1866, and are the only surviving remains of the James River Steam Brewery, which operated on the site between 1866 and 1879. The brewery was owned by David G. Yuengling, Jr., son of David Yuengling, the founder of the Yuengling brewery in Pennsylvania, and two business partners. At its height, the brewery complex included a beer garden and park that remained popular even after the brewery closed in 1879. Most of the brewery's buildings were destroyed by fire in 1891. The walls of the surviving tunnels are lined with dressed ashlar granite. The west walls, which have tunnel openings, are overgrown; only small portions of the north and south walls are visible above ground.

The tunnels were listed on the National Register of Historic Places in 2014.

== See also ==
- National Register of Historic Places listings in Henrico County, Virginia
