= Cifax Rural Historic District =

Historic district in Virginia, United States

- U.S. National Register of Historic Places
- U.S. Historic district
- Virginia Landmarks Register
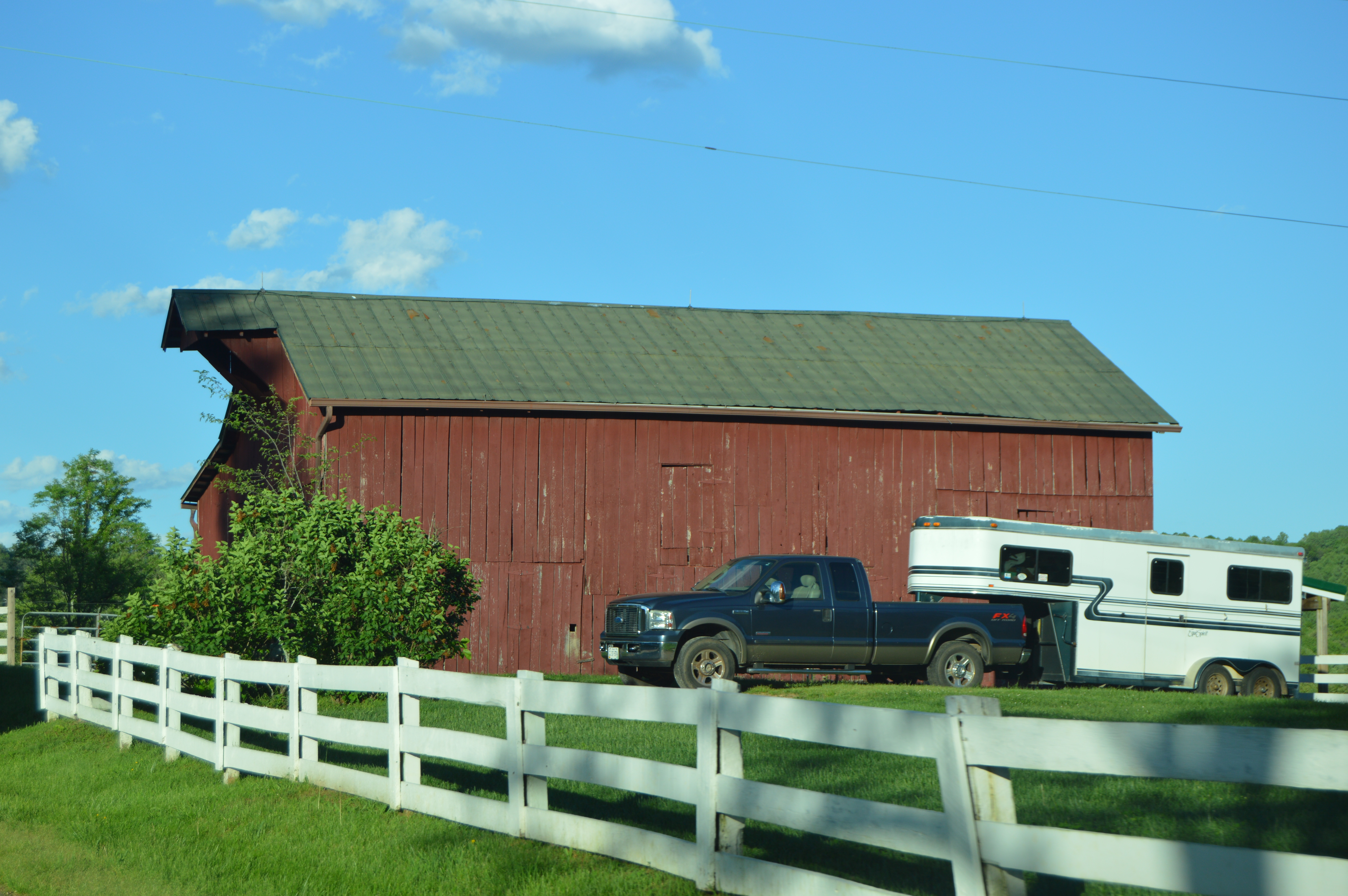
- Barn at The Cedars, just east of the central intersection

- Location within Virginia Location within the United States
- Location: Jct. of VA 644 and VA 643 and surrounding valley area, Cifax, Virginia
- Coordinates: 37°25′02″N 79°24′32″W
- Area: 1,800 acres (730 ha)
- Architect: Pendleton S. Clark, Charles F. Gillette
- Architectural style: Colonial Revival, Greek Revival
- NRHP reference No.: 92000052
- VLR No.: 009-0254

Significant dates
- Added to NRHP: February 20, 1992
- Designated VLR: August 21, 1991

Cifax Rural Historic District is a national historic district located near Cifax, Bedford County, Virginia. It encompasses 51 contributing buildings, 7 contributing sites, and 2 contributing structures. The district includes the dwellings and outbuildings of prominent families, the houses of the poor and middling farmers and the laborers who in part depended on them for employment, and the stores, schools, and churches that served them. Notable buildings include the Dillard-Coffey House, Logwood-Williams House, Old Nazareth Methodist Episcopal Church, Poplar Springs Baptist Church, Cifax School, The Cedars, Noell-Lankford House, Poindexter-Ellett-Higginbotham Farm, and Glen Alpine designed by architect Pendleton S. Clark with landscaping by Charles F. Gillette.

It was listed on the National Register of Historic Places in 1992.
