= Meadowbrook Country Club (Chesterfield County, Virginia) =

Private golf club in Virginia, US

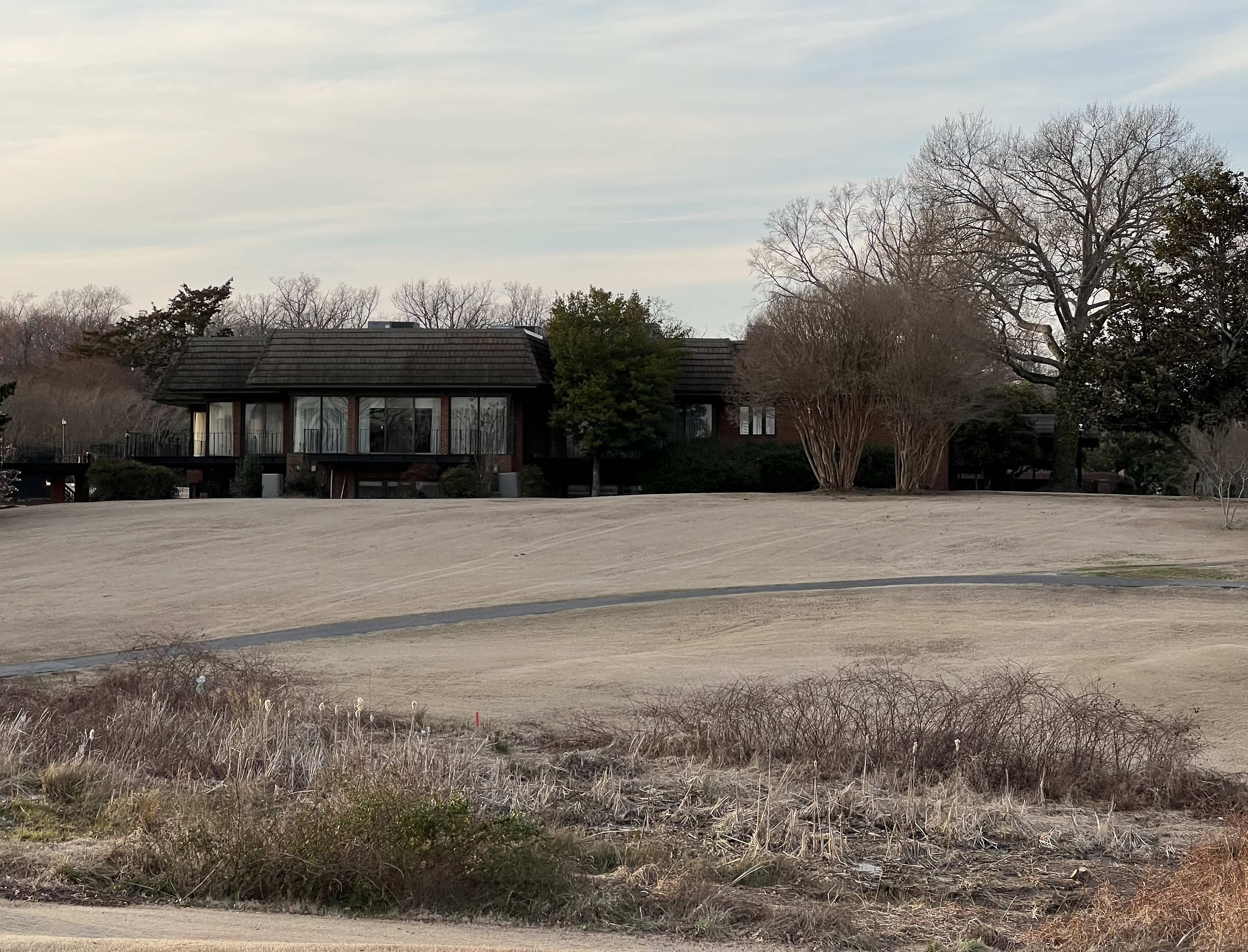

- Location within the United States Location within Virginia
- 37°26′53.41″N 77°27′49.39″W

Club information
- Location: Richmond, Virginia, U.S.
- Elevation: 197 feet (60 m)
- Type: Private
- Owner: Member owned
- Tota holes: 18
- Greens: bentgrass
- Fairways: Bermuda grass
- Website: Meadowbrook Country Club
- Designed by: Keith Foster
- Par: 71
- Length: 6,596 yards (6,031 m)
- Course rating: 71.6

Meadowbrook Country Club (Chesterfield County, Virginia) is a private golf and social club located at 3700 Cogbill Road in Richmond, Virginia. The club was formed in 1957.

== History of the estate ==
The Meadowbrook Country Club was once Meadowbrook Farm, a large and historic estate owned by the Jeffress family, who were among the earliest settlers in Virginia. The Jeffress family lived in a Tudor mansion that eventually became the original clubhouse for the country club. The family began the elaborate plantings and garden on their land, and the large formal garden was later enhanced by the "personal stamp" of Charles F. Gillette, who was also working on gardens for the Virginia Governor's Executive Mansion in Richmond and on Agecroft Hall.

In 2013 Lake Chesdin Golf Club merged with Meadowbrook Country Club. The idea was to consolidate and help attract members to both clubs. The two formed an LLC called: Meadowbrook-Chesdin LLC. The LLC paid $1.2 million to purchase the 200 acres (81 ha) Chesdin course. The partnership ended in 2014 over financial concerns from the Chesdin club. Upon dissolution, members were given the choice as to which club they would settle into.

== The Gardens ==
The Women of Meadowbrook Country Club is a non-profit women's club, a group originally founded in 1965 to preserve the historic gardens of the club which had been designed by renowned landscape architect Charles F. Gillette for the original estate grounds in Chesterfield County where the club is situated. Although the country club was founded in 1957, the gardens are much older, having been begun by the Jeffress family on their estate. The Gardens have a noteworthy Gazebo.

== Golf ==
The original course designer was Robert Bruce Harris. In 2000, the course was upgraded and redesigned by Keith Foster at a cost of $2 million dollars.

The 18-hole Meadowbrook course features 6,663 yards (6,093 m) of golf from the longest tees for a par of 71. The course is rated 71.6 and has a slope rating of 120 on Bermuda grass. The course was designed by Frederick A. Findlay and opened in 1957. The course currently features 30 tees driving range and 18 regulation holes. The course has bentgrass putting greens and bermudagrass fairways and consists of four Par 3's, nine Par 4's and three Par 5's. The course has four sets of men's tees and two sets of ladies' tees.
