= John Whitworth House =

Historic house in Virginia, United States

- U.S. National Register of Historic Places
- Virginia Landmarks Register
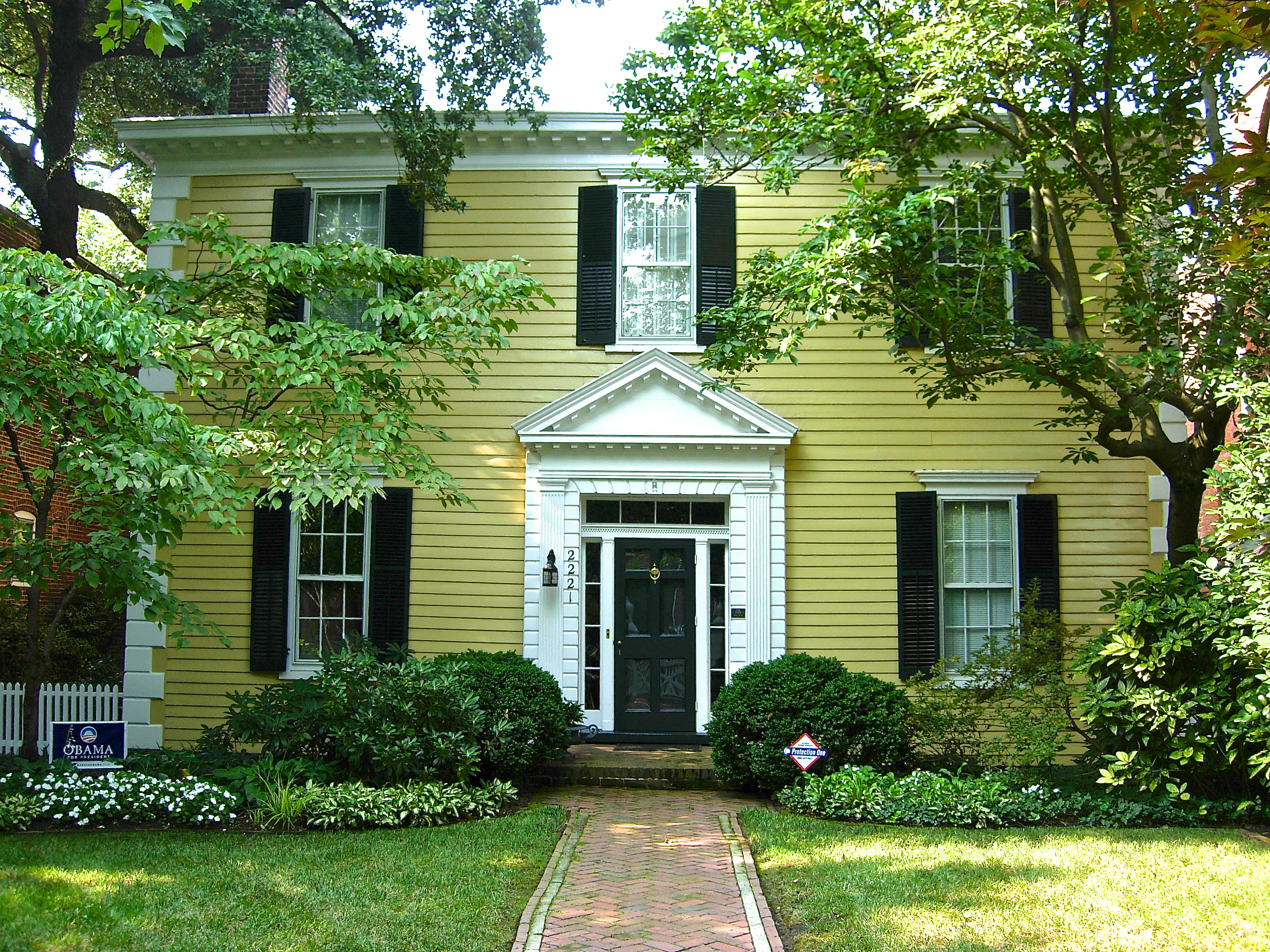
- John Whitworth House, August 2012

- Location within Virginia Location within the United States
- Location: 2221 Grove Ave., Richmond, Virginia
- Coordinates: 37°33′9″N 77°28′5″W
- Area: less than one acre
- Built: 1857, 1923
- Architect: Gillette, Charles F.
- Architectural style: Greek Revival, Colonial Revival
- NRHP reference No.: 99000143
- VLR No.: 127-0248-0001

Significant dates
- Added to NRHP: February 5, 1999
- Designated VLR: December 3, 1997

John Whitworth House is a historic home located in Richmond, Virginia. It was built in 1857, and is a two-story, three-bay, Greek Revival style frame dwelling with a low hipped roof. The house was purchased by noted landscape architect Charles F. Gillette in 1923 and subsequently remodeled in the Colonial Revival style. The property includes a formal garden designed by Gillette.

It was listed on the National Register of Historic Places in 1999.
