= Laurel Industrial School Historic District =

Historic district in Virginia, United States

- U.S. National Register of Historic Places
- U.S. Historic district
- Virginia Landmarks Register
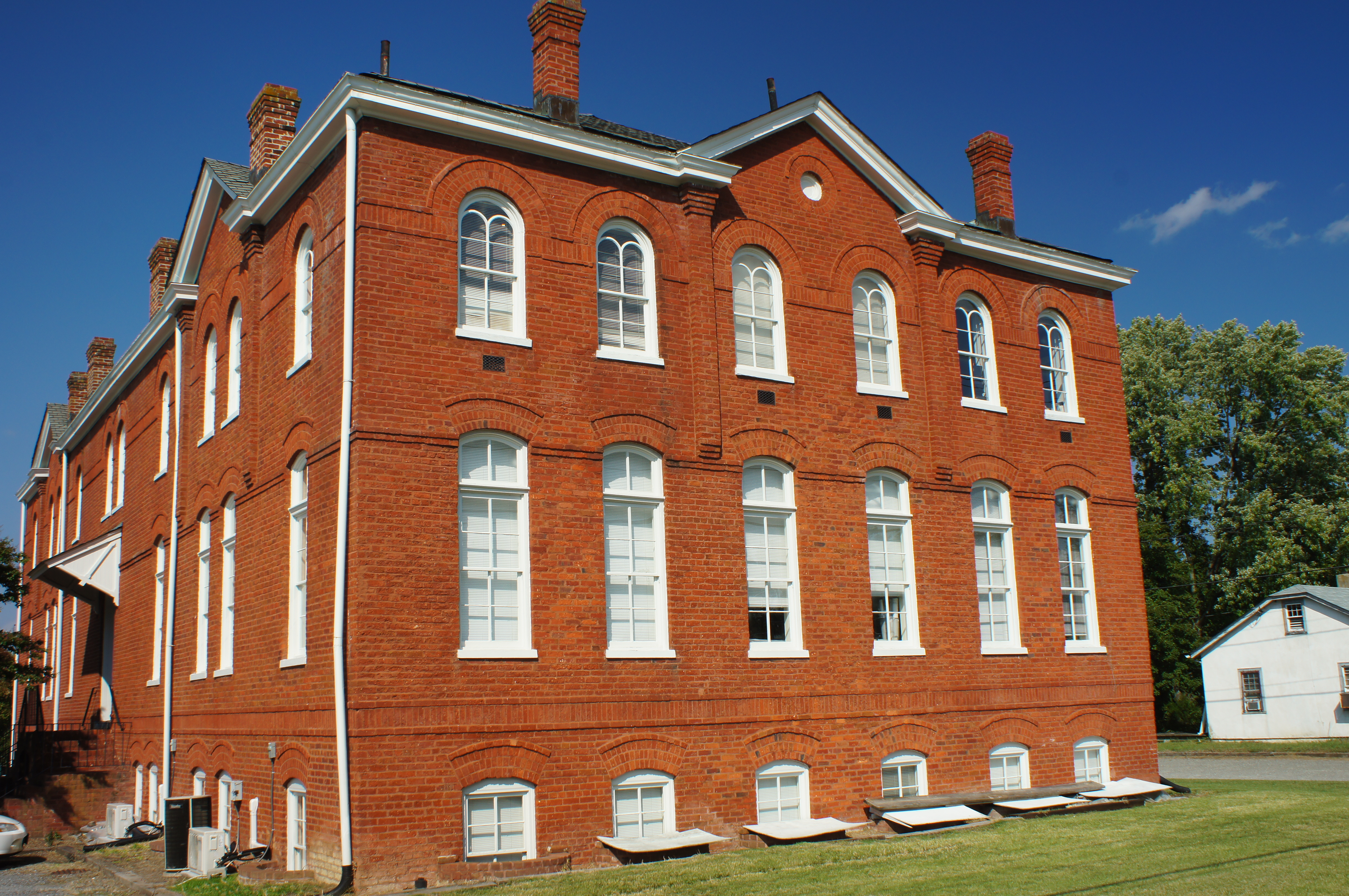

- Location within Virginia Location within the United States
- Location: N & S sides of Hungary Rd. W of Old Staples Mill Rd., in Laurel, Virginia
- Coordinates: 37°38′35″N 77°30′37″W
- Area: 6 acres (2.4 ha)
- Built: 1892
- Architectural style: Colonial Revival, Romanesque, Georgian Revival
- NRHP reference No.: 87001149
- VLR No.: 043-0292

Significant dates
- Added to NRHP: June 12, 1987
- Designated VLR: October 15, 1985

The Laurel Industrial School Historic District is a 6-acre (2.4 ha) historic district near Laurel, Virginia. The site was the center of the 175-acre (71 ha) Laurel Industrial School, later known as the Virginia Industrial School, the first public school in Henrico County. It was established by the Prison Association of Virginia, a Progressive group dedicated to prison reform at the turn of the 20th century. The school started a pattern of correctional reform which affected many institutions across Virginia throughout the 20th century.

It was identified as a Virginia Historic Landmark in 1985 and was listed on the National Register of Historic Places (NRHP) in 1987, at which time at which time it included five contributing buildings and one noncontributing building. The main building was called the Robert Stiles building and was named after a Confederate major of artillery in General Robert E. Lee's Army of Northern Virginia. The district was the center of the sprawling complex of Virginia's first reformatory/industrial school.

The district may be affected by the DC2RVA high-speed rail proposal.

== History ==
=== Prison Association of Virginia ===
When a recommendation was made, but ignored by legislators, that Virginia separate its juvenile and adult offenders, a group of prominent Virginians, including former Confederate Army soldiers, businessmen, and politicians, organized the Prison Association of Virginia. The organization was inspired by the Progressive movement, which had been slow to take off in Virginia. The group was unusual in that it functioned almost as an extension of state government while still being nominally independent. Their ambitions were altruistic but not realistic. They included improving the governance, discipline, and management of prisons in the state; ameliorate prisoners' conditions; and aid convicts who demonstrated a desire to reform. Governor Fitzhugh Lee supported their initiatives. They wanted the school to become a model for reformatory correctional institutions in the state.

=== History of the school ===
In November 1890, a Lynchburg court sent the first boy, named Walter Turpin, to the Association, who at the time operated the program at a temporary location in a donated house in Eastern Henrico. 12 more boys were sent in six months and plans were developed for a new complex, including the purchase of 90 acres in the area then known as Laurel Station.

In 1895, the Association's President, James Caskie, asked the General Assembly for money, which was awarded in 1906, to build a second dormitory for the school's expanding population.

By January 1896, the school's population had rapidly grown to 132 boys and the facility grew in response to demand. The General Assembly paid for an entirely new building with a kitchen, dormitory, washroom, dining hall, and schoolroom.

By 1910, there were 325 boys at the school.

==== Criticism of the school's operations ====
Caskie, admitted to the General Assembly that the school had some issues; only white boys were allowed to go there, and the operation of the school took so much time and effort that the Association was not able to focus on its other goals.

In 1901-1902, a state report on the school said that its sanitary facilities were poor, low water supplies were making the administration nervous, and that the dormitories couldn't handle the rapidly increasing population.

Superintendent Davis, who had resigned, wrote an article in the Richmond Evening Post after a disagreement with Hutzler — that was partially about the quality of food served at the institution — saying that the school was "a nursery of vice and not [a] place of reform" and was "largely a moral failure." He argued that the institution was mismanaged and corrupt, which led to him resigning twice. He said that the state already furnished all the money for the school and should take charge of its operations. Hutzler made a counter-statement, saying that the allegations were untrue and were made by a "disappointed and discredited individual." However, despite Hutzler's rejection of the allegations, the State Board of Charities and Corrections conducted a second investigation of the school. The Prison Association was absolved of any mismanagement, but it was recommended to then-governor William Hodges Mann that the state take control of the school.

=== Life at the school ===
Some of the children at the school were as young as 6-7 years old. However, the school was designed to prevent mingling between older and younger boys as much as possible.

Boys were sent to the school for indeterminate sentences in the early years; they were held until they had been judged to have "reformed." The school's average period of detention was one year, nine months, and twelve days.

By 1910, there were enough boys to necessitate organization into 'families' of thirty to fifty boys who watched them around the clock. At any given time, there could be 300 boys at the school.

The Association wanted the boys to experience the life of a middle-class child going to public school. In spite of the presence of the whip and solitary confinement at the school, the boys were able to have fun experiences. They were taken to the state fair, celebrated holidays, went to baseball games, sang, played music, and had their own theatrical troupe and band. They were given better-fitting clothes than children in other institutions.

==== Daily life ====
The education that they received was very moral. In 1903, the school introduced the Sloyd method, which taught woodworking and other handicrafts via a system of gradual introduction to tools, starting with the jackknife. Then-president of the Prison Association Charles Hutzler wanted to use the method to help prevent idleness, and help the children engage their thoughts and hands. Children were allowed to sell their work but had to put the money back to the school.

Their weekdays consisted of eight hours of labor, two hours and 45 minutes of schooltime, one hour for visiting, and one hour for play. They had to perform five hours of labor on Saturdays and had two hours and 35 minutes for visiting. There were no visiting hours on Sundays. Their mealtimes were silent and they were given instruction on formal table manners.

The boys either worked for hire for local residents or worked at a succession of local enterprises on the property, beginning with the manufacture of horse collars then the fabrication of shirts. Outside of those options, boys could work in the kitchen, farm, greenhouse, shoe shop, and laundry. They were also kept busy with repairs, chopping wood, and making bricks. Some of those bricks went to the Superintendent's administration building, which they helped build with the help of only one professionally-trained builder.

They wanted the business operations to make the school self-sufficient and thus reduce the burden on the state budget, but this goal never came to fruition; the school received state appropriations from its founding until the Commonwealth took control in 1920. The boys lived on a bare minimum diet because that was what the school could afford.

The main building's second floor had dormitory space, while the first floor had a school room/chapel to the south and a dining room to the north. The basement area was used for washing and related activities and a kitchen that sent food up via dumbwaiter.

==== Discipline ====
The severity of discipline at the school, or lack thereof, was a contentious issue. Corporal punishment was common at the time, but the school was especially harsh. Disciplinary measures were often unexpected by the boys. Harsh discipline at the school sparked an 1898 House committee investigation. Boys rebelled because of the vicious nature of the discipline. Escapes were common and newspapers loved to report on them. In 1898, a report produced by the Committee on Asylums and Prisons recommended the use of cages, not shackles, as disciplinary measures. In the second half of 1910, 31 boys escaped. Those who escaped had chains attached to their ankles so that their movements could be overheard. Other serious disciplinary violations that occurred included windows being broken, a boy being shot, and a guard being murdered. Recidivism was high at the school.

=== Closure and post-closure history ===
In the late 1910s and early 1920s, an efficiency movement in the commonwealth led to consolidation and the adoption of some Northern ideals across the government. The Commonwealth took over many tasks that, in the South, had traditionally been the responsibilities of local government; they also worked to professionalize many parts of the government. On February 21, 1920, the commonwealth ordered that Laurel transfer all property and control to the state. The program was gradually moved, but sources disagree as to where and when; some say that it was moved to an unnamed location in Goochland County in 1932, while others say that it was moved to Beaumont in Powhatan County. Its name was changed to the Virginia Industrial School for Boys.

The Robert Stiles building was used as a grocery store and apartments, but went vacant and fell into disrepair during the 1980s after the store closed down. The building was put up for auction in 1983 and was bought by the only bidder, Dr. Robert Bluford Jr., who had a keen interest in preservation and took efforts to ensure that the building was returned to its original state. He had also been involved in saving the Laurel Presbyterian Church and the building of the current Laurel Gallery. His son's medical supply business moved there in 1985.

The Adeline Russell building, which was the school's second dormitory, was converted to serve as the building for Laurel Elementary School, but was then demolished. Other support buildings became residences and a golf course was made with the tailor shop at its heart.

=== Effects of the school ===
The norms established by reform schools persisted late into the 21st century.

The first separate courts for juveniles in Virginia were established in 1899, partially because of institutions like Laurel. These were originally equity courts, meaning that the court had extremely wide latitude to do whatever they needed to "to intervene and help that child go on a straighter path." It wasn't until the 1960s, however, that juvenile courts started to implement similar rights and protections as adult courts; this was due to multiple court decisions; notably among them were In re Gault and In re Winship.

Henrico's modern juvenile detention center is located on Dixon Powers Drive, which is named after Henrico's first juvenile judge, who lived in the former administration building of Laurel Industrial School.

== Architecture ==
The Main building, or Robert Stiles building, was built in the Romanesque-Revival-Victorian style. The intricate bridge truss system, made of iron-tie beams and massive wood struts, supporting its roof may be the only exposed example of that type in Virginia; the NHRP nomination lists that and its hipped slate roof as its most notable architectural feature. It is a large, two-story structure with a simple internal layout of about 14,700 sq ft (1,370 m^{2}). Its raised floor is reminiscent of the piano nobile idea.

The support buildings were typical of turn-of-the-century American architecture and included pyramidal, Georgian revival, and gable-front styles with some unique variations. The district preserves the character of the small neighborhood that originated with the school's founding.
