= Laurel, Virginia =

- Census-designated place
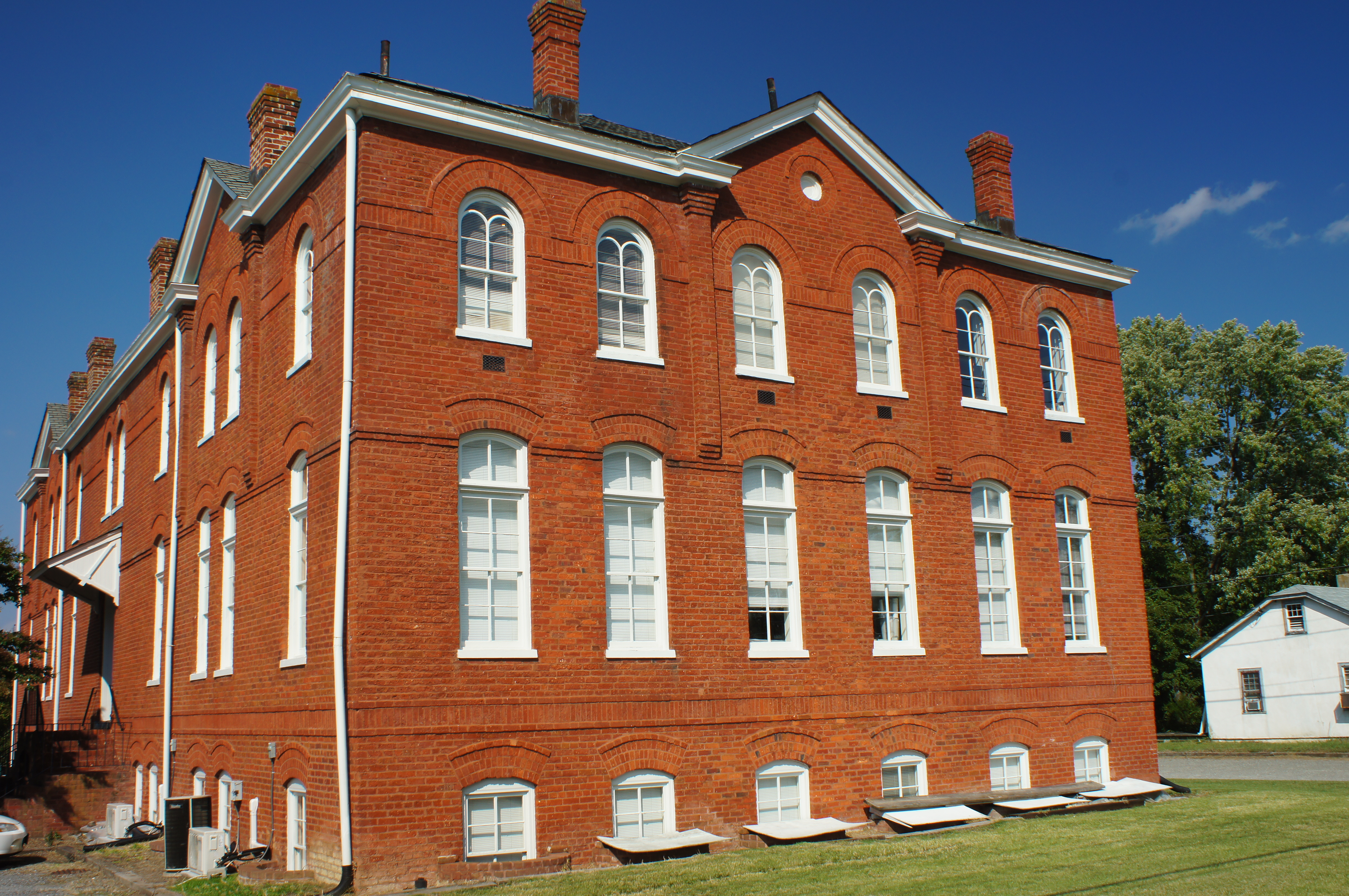
- A building from the Laurel Industrial School Historic District

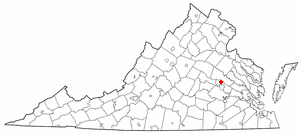
- Location of Laurel, Virginia
- Coordinates: 37°38′2″N 77°30′24″W
- Country: United States
- State: Virginia
- County: Henrico

Area
  - Total: 5.4 sq mi (14.1 km^{2})
  - Land: 5.4 sq mi (14.0 km^{2})
  - Water: 0.039 sq mi (0.1 km^{2})
- Elevation: 243 ft (74 m)

Population (2020)
  - Total: 17,769
  - Density: 3,290/sq mi (1,270/km^{2})
- Time zone: UTC−5 (Eastern (EST))
  - Summer (DST): UTC−4 (EDT)
- ZIP Codes: 23075, 23228, 23229, 23231, 23233, 23238, 23242, 23255, 23288, 23294
- FIPS code: 51-44280
- GNIS feature ID: 1469155

Laurel is a census-designated place (CDP) in western Henrico County, Virginia, United States, named after the number of laurel trees in the area. The population was 17,769 at the 2020 United States Census.

Laurel is the location of the Laurel Skate Park. The bowl was recently filled in with smooth concrete and the vertical ramp removed to make way for safer amenities.

Laurel is the location of the Laurel Industrial School Historic District.

== History ==
Laurel's previous names include Hungary; Hungary Station; Jenningsville, so named because the Jennings family, who were large landholders and have a family gravesite at the site of the historic district; and School. In the 19th century, Laurel was a stop on the Richmond, Fredericksburg and Potomac (RF&P) Railroad. It was a spur line that connected the coalfields in western Henrico with the rail network. During the Civil War, the station was burned. Union Army Colonel Ulric Dahlgren's body was secretly buried there in March 1864; the body was later re-interred to Philadelphia. The RF&P railroad is succeeded by CSX Transportation, which still operates on the same rights-of-way.

The A.A. Harvey General Store was built c. 1910 to serve the community. Over the years, the building has undergone several transformations. It went from general store to housing. It then became the Crystal Ice Co. and the Laurel Post Office, where Lillian Merkle was Postmaster. The Post Office was one of only a few in the United States that was privately owned. The building was completely restored in 1991 to its present use as the Laurel Gallery. Robert Bluford, the preservationist, made efforts to ensure that the restored building stayed true to its original style.

== Geography ==
Laurel is located at 37°38′2″N 77°30′24″W (37.634012, −77.506661).

According to the United States Census Bureau, the CDP has a total area of 5.4 square miles (14.1 km^{2}), of which 5.4 square miles (14.0 km^{2}) is land and 0.04 square miles (0.1 km^{2}), or 0.71%, is water.

== Demographics ==
Historical population
Census	Pop.	Note	%±
1980	10,569		—
1990	13,011		23.1%
2000	14,875		14.3%
2010	16,713		12.4%
2020	17,769		6.3%
U.S. Decennial Census; 1950 1960 1970; 1980 1990 2000; 2010

Laurel was first listed as a census designated place in the 1980 U.S. census.

=== Racial and ethnic composition ===
Laurel CDP, Virginia – Racial and ethnic composition Note: the US Census treats Hispanic/Latino as an ethnic category. This table excludes Latinos from the racial categories and assigns them to a separate category. Hispanics/Latinos may be of any race.
Race / Ethnicity (NH = Non-Hispanic)	Pop 2000	Pop 2010	Pop 2020	% 2000	% 2010	% 2020
White alone (NH)	9,435	8,373	8,019	63.43%	50.10%	45.13%
Black or African American alone (NH)	3,567	4,989	4,730	23.98%	29.85%	26.62%
Native American or Alaska Native alone (NH)	47	53	61	0.32%	0.32%	0.34%
Asian alone (NH)	910	1,031	1,676	6.12%	6.17%	9.43%
Native Hawaiian or Pacific Islander alone (NH)	5	9	19	0.03%	0.05%	0.11%
Other race alone (NH)	26	82	151	0.17%	0.49%	0.85%
Mixed race or Multiracial (NH)	267	330	822	1.79%	1.97%	4.63%
Hispanic or Latino (any race)	618	1,846	2,291	4.15%	11.05%	12.89%
Total	14,875	16,713	17,769	100.00%	100.00%	100.00%

=== 2020 census ===
As of the 2020 census, Laurel had a population of 17,769. The median age was 36.2 years. 20.5% of residents were under the age of 18 and 14.4% of residents were 65 years of age or older. For every 100 females there were 94.0 males, and for every 100 females age 18 and over there were 91.5 males age 18 and over.

100.0% of residents lived in urban areas, while 0.0% lived in rural areas.

There were 7,126 households in Laurel, of which 28.1% had children under the age of 18 living in them. Of all households, 37.2% were married-couple households, 20.2% were households with a male householder and no spouse or partner present, and 34.6% were households with a female householder and no spouse or partner present. About 33.6% of all households were made up of individuals and 12.4% had someone living alone who was 65 years of age or older.

There were 7,493 housing units, of which 4.9% were vacant. The homeowner vacancy rate was 0.9% and the rental vacancy rate was 6.0%.

Racial composition as of the 2020 census
Race	Number	Percent
White	8,388	47.2%
Black or African American	4,825	27.2%
American Indian and Alaska Native	118	0.7%
Asian	1,680	9.5%
Native Hawaiian and Other Pacific Islander	22	0.1%
Some other race	1,392	7.8%

=== 2000 census ===
As of the census of 2000, there were 14,875 people, 6,288 households, and 3,634 families residing in the CDP. The population density was 2,713.6 inhabitants per square mile (1,047.7/km^{2}). There were 6,522 housing units at an average density of 1,189.8 sq mi (3,082 km^{2}). The racial makeup of the CDP was 64.98% White, 24.30% African American, 0.33% Native American, 6.16% Asian, 0.05% Pacific Islander, 2.08% from other races, and 2.08% from two or more races. Hispanic or Latino of any race were 4.15% of the population.

There were 6,288 households, out of which 27.2% had children under the age of 18 living with them, 42.0% were married couples living together, 12.0% had a female householder with no husband present, and 42.2% were non-families. 32.8% of all households were made up of individuals, and 7.1% had someone living alone who was 65 years of age or older. The average household size was 2.24 and the average family size was 2.87.

In the CDP, the population was spread out, with 20.2% under the age of 18, 10.6% from 18 to 24, 38.5% from 25 to 44, 19.6% from 45 to 64, and 11.0% who were 65 years of age or older. The median age was 34 years. For every 100 females, there were 93.4 males. For every 100 females age 18 and over, there were 91.6 males.

The median income for a household in the CDP was $42,128, and the median income for a family was $52,579. Males had a median income of $31,495 versus $30,158 for females. The per capita income for the CDP was $21,893. About 3.8% of families and 5.4% of the population were below the poverty line, including 4.7% of those under age 18 and 2.0% of those age 65 or over.
