= Cifax, Virginia =

Unincorporated community in Virginia, United States

- Unincorporated community
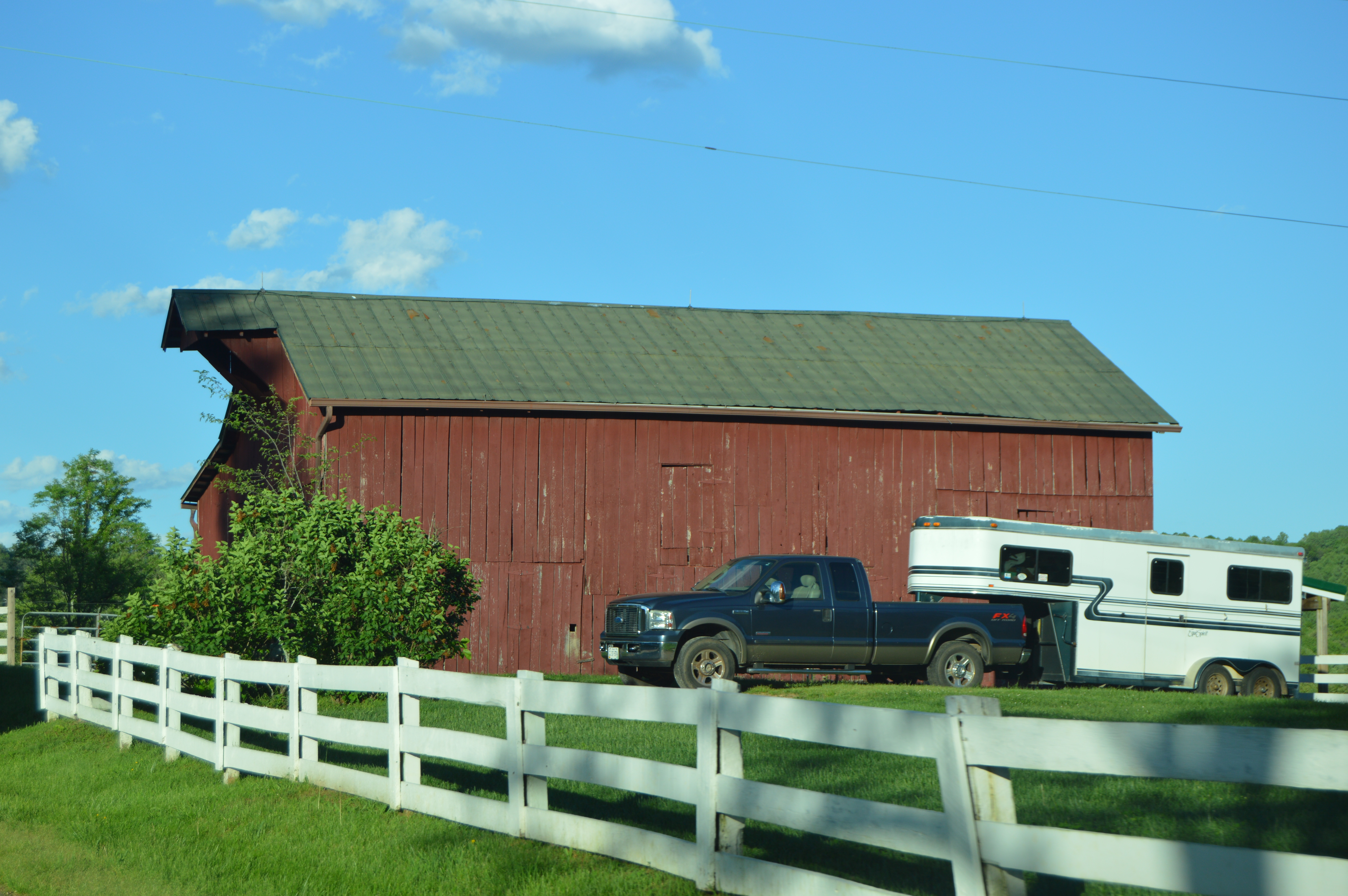
- Barn at The Cedars farmstead, a core part of the community

- Location within Virginia Location within the United States
- Coordinates: 37°24′40″N 79°24′27″W
- Country: United States
- State: Virginia
- County: Bedford
- Elevation: 938 ft (286 m)
- Time zone: UTC-5 (Eastern (EST))
  - Summer (DST): UTC-4 (EDT)
- Area code: 540
- GNIS feature ID: 1499264

Cifax is an unincorporated community in Bedford County, Virginia, United States. Cifax is located at the junction of State Routes 643 and 644, 8.3 miles (13.4 km) northeast of Bedford.

The Cifax Rural Historic District, which includes Cifax and the surrounding area, is listed on the National Register of Historic Places.
