= Gallison Hall =

Historic house in Virginia, United States

- U.S. National Register of Historic Places
- Virginia Landmarks Register
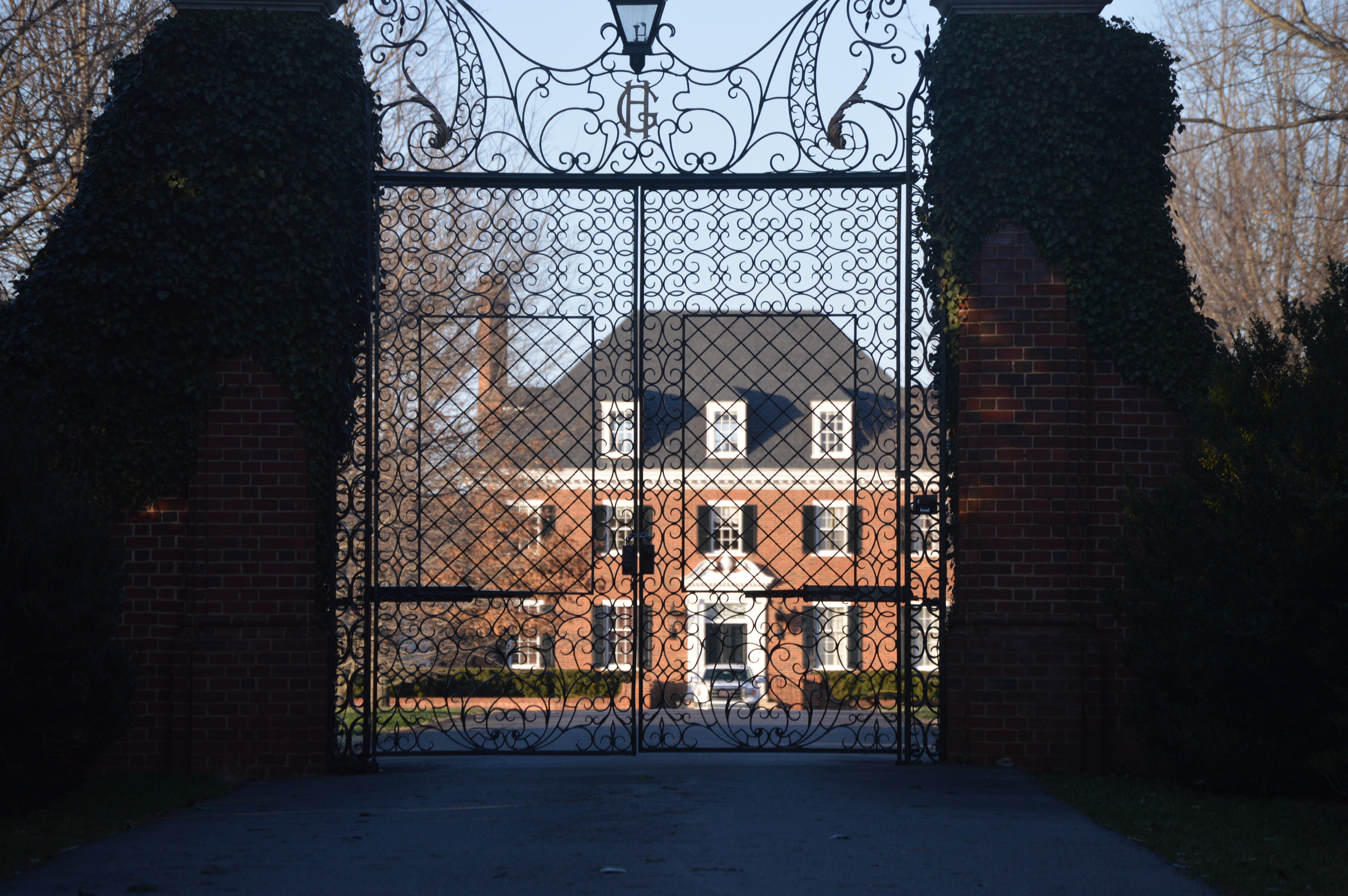
- Gate view

- Location within Virginia Location within the United States
- Location: 150 Finders Way, Charlottesville, Virginia 22901
- Coordinates: 38°4′10″N 78°32′09″W
- Area: 44 acres (18 ha)
- Built: 1930-1933
- Architect: Stanhope Johnson, Charles F. Gillette
- Architectural style: Colonial Revival, Georgian Revival
- NRHP reference No.: 90002013
- VLR No.: 002-0808

Significant dates
- Added to NRHP: December 28, 1990
- Designated VLR: February 20, 1990

Gallison Hall is a historic home located near Charlottesville in Albemarle County, Virginia, United States. It was designed by the architect Stanhope Johnson in the Georgian Revival style, and built between 1931 and 1933. It consists of a 2½-story, five-bay, brick center section with a steeply pitched hipped roof, flanked by 1 1/2-story, three-bay, gable-roofed wings connected by hyphens. At each end are a seven-bay brick arcades connected to a 1 1/2-story two-bay gable-roofed garage on the east and an identical arcade connected to an octagonal gazebo brick on the west. The house is set among English gardens designed by Charles F. Gillette.

It was added to the National Register of Historic Places in 1990.
