= Mankin Mansion =

Historic house in Virginia, United States

- U.S. National Register of Historic Places
- Virginia Landmarks Register
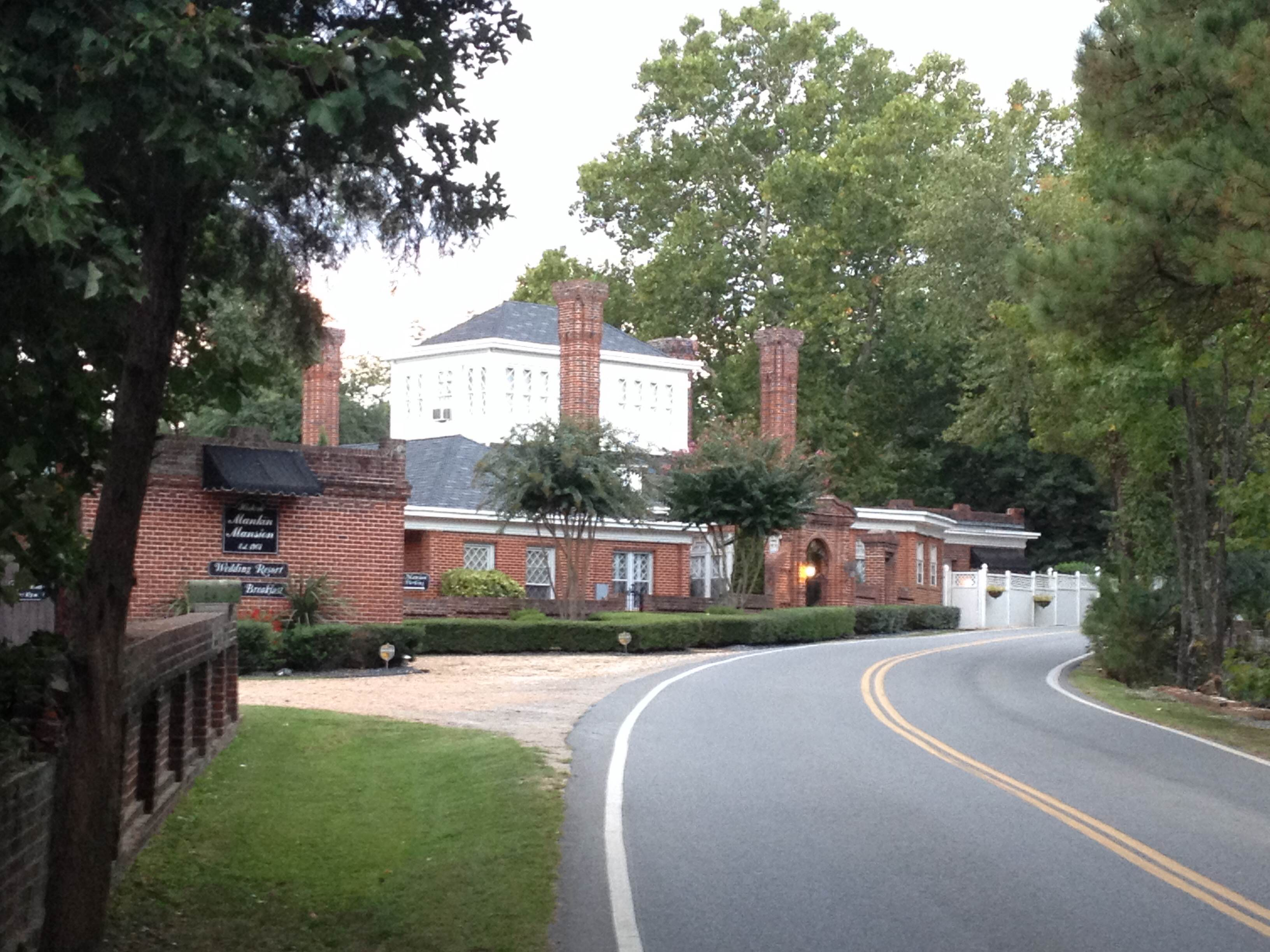

- Location within Virginia Location within the United States
- Location: 4300 Oakleys Ln., Richmond, Virginia
- Coordinates: 37°32′10″N 77°20′50″W
- Area: 2.5 acres (1.0 ha)
- Built: 1924
- Architect: Mankin, Edward Thurston
- Architectural style: Colonial Revival, Georgian Revival
- NRHP reference No.: 93001124
- VLR No.: 043-0068

Significant dates
- Added to NRHP: October 14, 1993
- Designated VLR: August 18, 1993

Mankin Mansion, also known as Brickworks or as Irvin Place, was built in 1924 as a home and showplace by and for Edward Thurston Mankin, a brick manufacturer. The architecture of the mansion, inside and out, and of walls, benches, and structures on the grounds, includes many features ingeniously implemented in brick.

The building's architecture is Georgian Revival, a subtype of Colonial Revival architecture. The house is featured in Foundations in Time II: More of Henrico’s Architectural Treasures, a Henrico County TV film available for viewing online. The mansion was saved from deterioration by its purchase by new owners who renovated it in 2004 and operate as a wedding and events venue.

It was listed on the National Register of Historic Places in 1993. In 1993, the NRHP listing included five contributing buildings, one contributing site, and two contributing structures.
