= Reynolds Metals Company International Headquarters =

- U.S. National Register of Historic Places
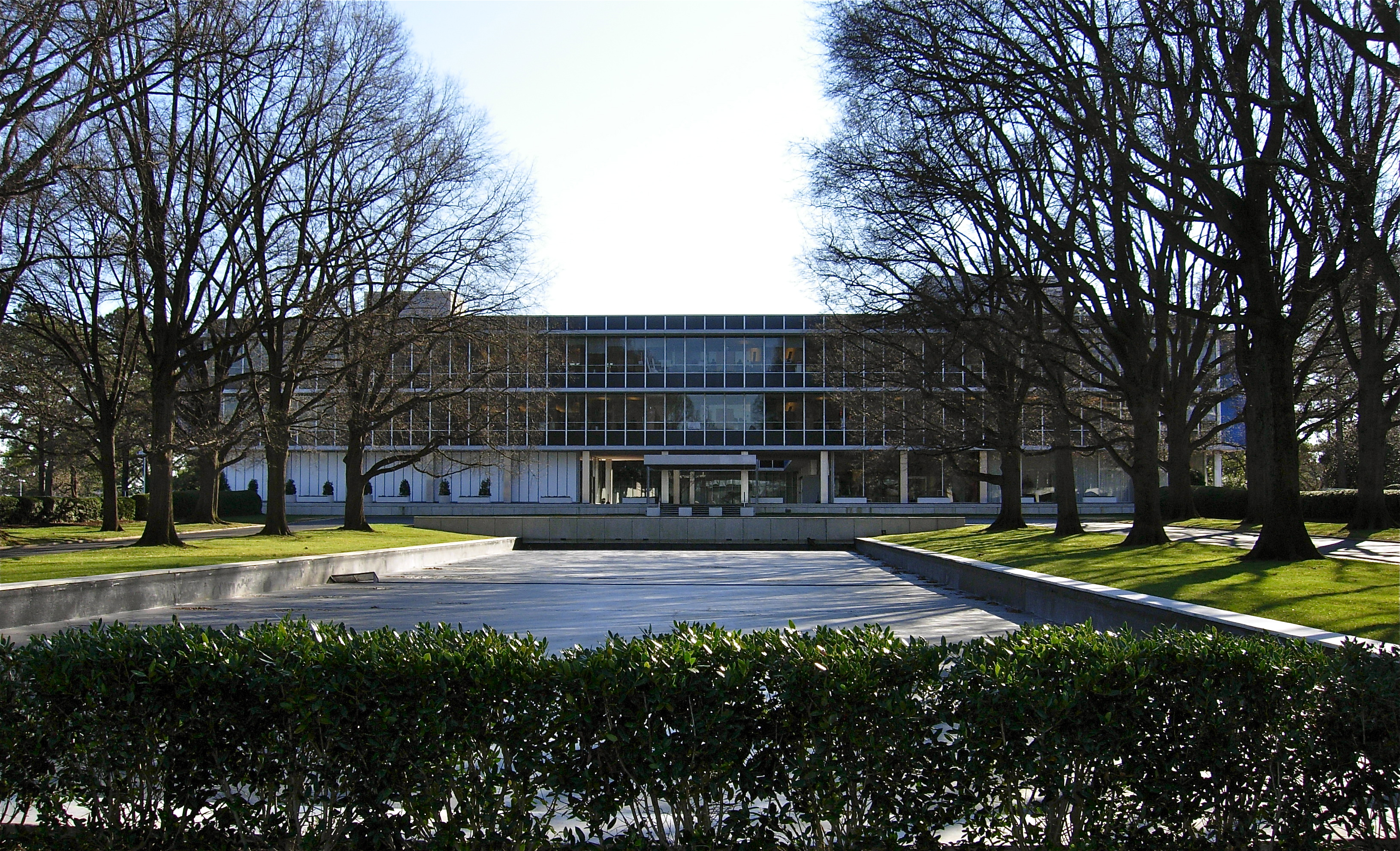

- Location within Virginia Location within the United States
- Location: 6601 W. Broad St., Richmond, Virginia
- Coordinates: 37.600875°N 77.516883°W
- Area: 121 acres (49 ha)
- Built: 1958
- Architect: Bunshaft, Gordon; Gillette, Charles F.
- Architectural style: International Style
- NRHP reference No.: 00000064
- Added to NRHP: April 26, 2000

The Reynolds Metals Company International Headquarters is an International Style building complex set in a composed landscape in Henrico County, near Richmond, Virginia, completed in 1958. The low-rise Executive Office Building was designed by Gordon Bunshaft of Skidmore, Owings and Merrill, in collaboration with Richmond landscape architect Charles F. Gillette. The headquarters complex has been cited as a prototype for modern suburban office development. It was listed on the National Register of Historic Places in 2000. It is the headquarters for the Altria Group, formerly known as the Philip Morris Companies, Inc. The property was owned by the University of Richmond before being sold to Altria.

== Description ==
The headquarters complex is set on a 121-acre (49 ha) site outside of Richmond, once a horse farm, that is now surrounded by suburban development. The Donovan Farm, also known as the "Horse Pen", gave its name to nearby Horsepen Road. The original site comprised the General Office Building (now the Executive Office Building), its podium, a service building and a greenhouse, as well as screened parking areas, formal gardens and a reflecting pool.

The principal element of the Reynolds headquarters complex is the Executive Office Building. Intended as a showcase for the products of the Reynolds Metals Company, the Executive Office Building incorporated aluminum, the company's principal product, wherever possible, principally in the building's exterior cladding, but even in interior furnishings and finishes, where carpets and draperies incorporated aluminum fibers.

The three-story building rests on an elevated podium. The lowest level appears as an open loggia with slender aluminum-clad columns. Windows span from slab to slab at all three levels, more deeply inset at the first level to reveal the columns. An interior courtyard illuminates interior spaces. Deep fixed overhangs on the south shade the windows from the sun, and are matched by non-functional overhangs on the north side. The east and west elevations feature bright blue adjustable aluminum louvers for sun control. The louvers are motorized to provide daylighting without direct glare.

=== Use of aluminum ===
The Executive Office Building uses a total of 1,235,800 pounds (560,500 kg) of aluminum, 400,000 pounds (180,000 kg) in the exterior cladding. The building retains much of its original furniture, such as built-in aluminum file cabinets, and other original furnishings are in use or in storage. Furniture was designed by Eero Saarinen, Florence Knoll, and Hans Wegner. The carpet and draperies are woven with aluminum thread.

=== Other structures ===
The four-story 1968 General Office Building, while sympathetic to the Executive Office Building, is not considered a contributing structure to the National Register property, nor are the 1978 Information Services Building and other support structures.
