= Woodside (Tuckahoe, Virginia) =

Historic house in Virginia, United States

- U.S. National Register of Historic Places
- Virginia Landmarks Register
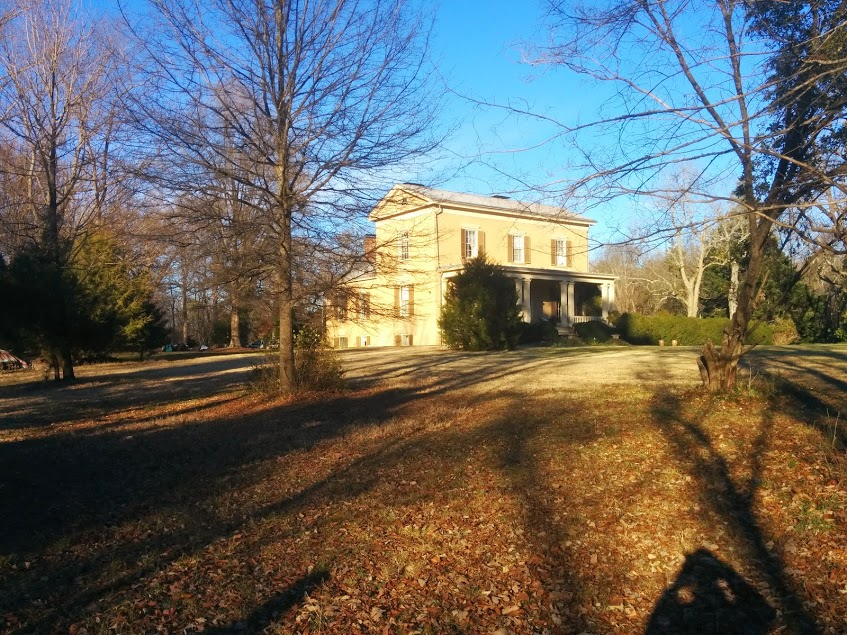

- Location within Virginia Location within the United States
- Location: 510 S. Gaskins Rd., near Tuckahoe, Virginia
- Coordinates: 37.579131°N 77.611641°W
- Area: 53 acres (21 ha)
- Built: 1858
- Architectural style: Greek Revival
- NRHP reference No.: 73002021
- VLR No.: 043-0012

Significant dates
- Added to NRHP: July 24, 1973
- Designated VLR: February 20, 1973

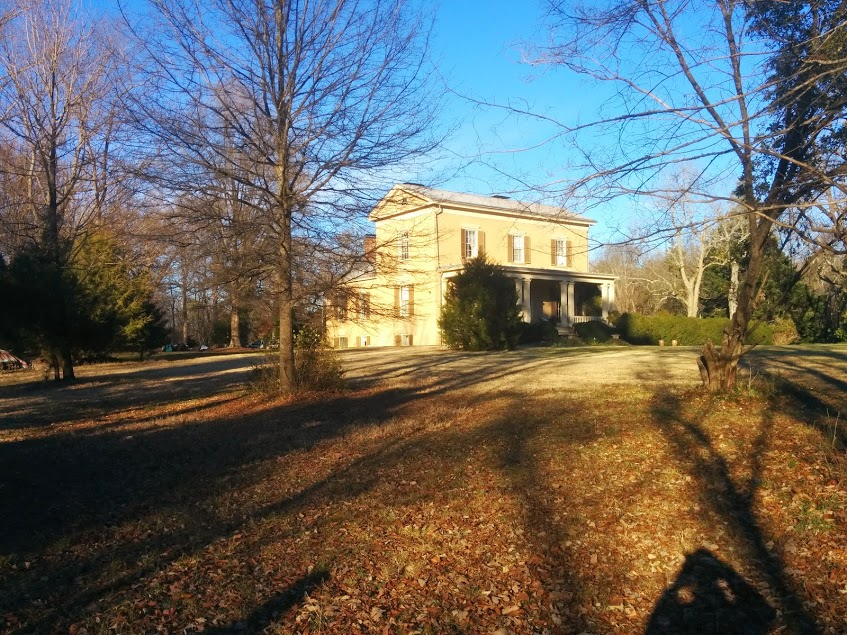
Woodside main house, front view

Woodside, near Tuckahoe, Virginia in Henrico County, Virginia, was built in 1858. It is a Greek Revival style villa, in the countryside but not a farmhouse. It was a family home of the Wickham family of Richmond. It was listed on the National Register of Historic Places in 1973.

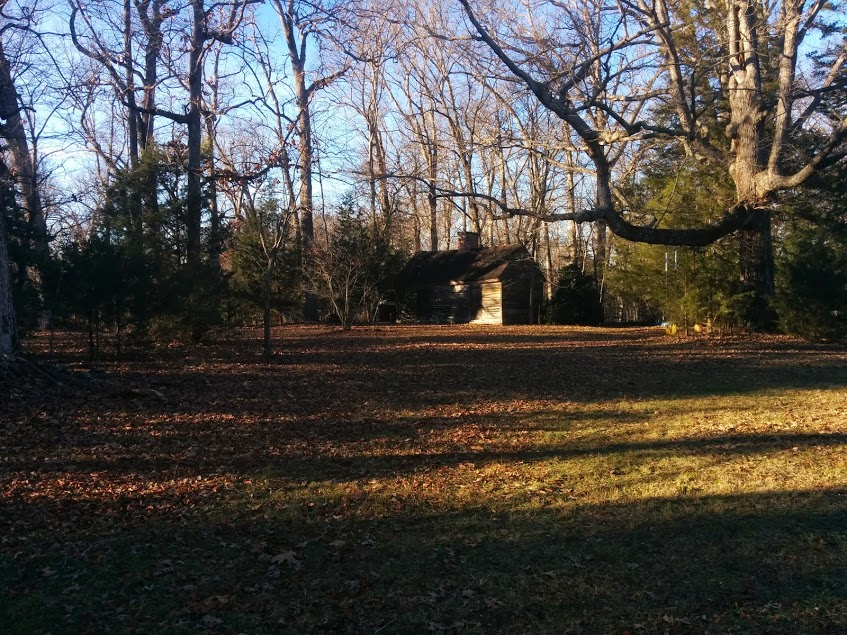
Woodside's summer kitchen

The house, along with open area around it, has been permanently protected by an easement.

It is located southwest of Tuckahoe off VA 157, at what is now 510 S. Gaskins Rd.
