= Markel Building =

Office building near Richmond, Virginia

- The Markel Building
- U.S. National Register of Historic Places
- Virginia Landmarks Register
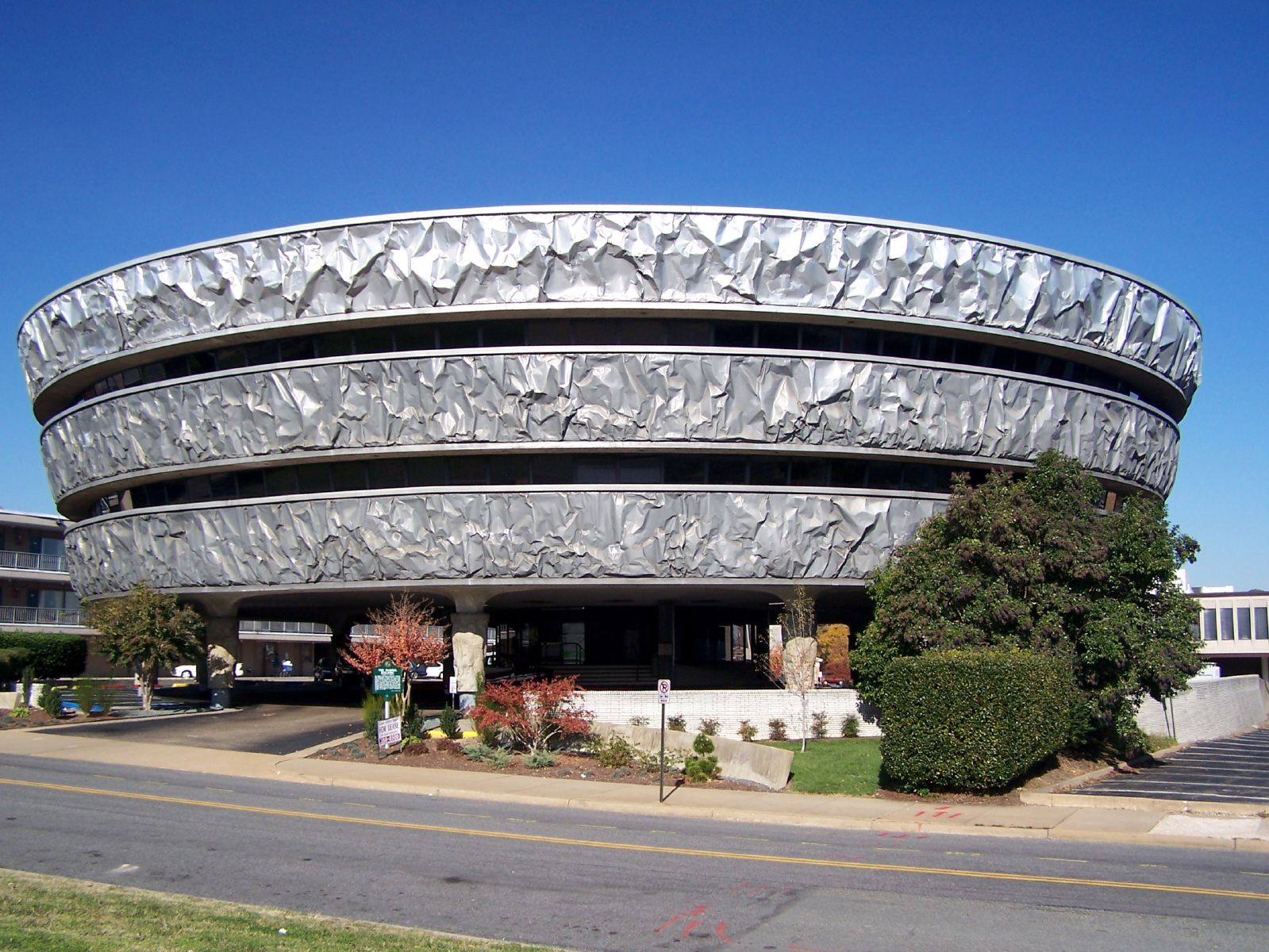
- The Markel Building from the south, 2006
- Interactive map of The Markel Building
- Location: 5310 Markel Road, Henrico, Virginia, U.S.
- Coordinates: 37°35′04″N 77°29′58″W
- Built: 1964‍–‍1966
- Architect: Haigh Jamgochian
- NRHP reference No.: 100000984
- VLR No.: 043-0715

Significant dates
- Added to NRHP: May 8, 2017
- Designated VLR: December 15, 2016

The Markel Building is an office building commissioned by the Markel Corporation and designed by Haigh Jamgochian (1924–2019) located on Markel Road just outside the city limits of Richmond, Virginia in Henrico County. The building was inspired by a baked potato wrapped in foil served to Jamgochian while attending an American Institute of Architects' dinner. The exterior siding of each floor consists of a single 555-foot piece of aluminum, the longest unbroken pieces of aluminum ever used as siding material.

The architect personally hammered some of the wrinkles on the top story. This is the only extant building by Jamgochian, the son of Armenian Genocide survivors.

The building was listed on the National Register of Historic Places May 8, 2017.
