= Flood Marker of 1771 =

- U.S. National Register of Historic Places
- Virginia Landmarks Register
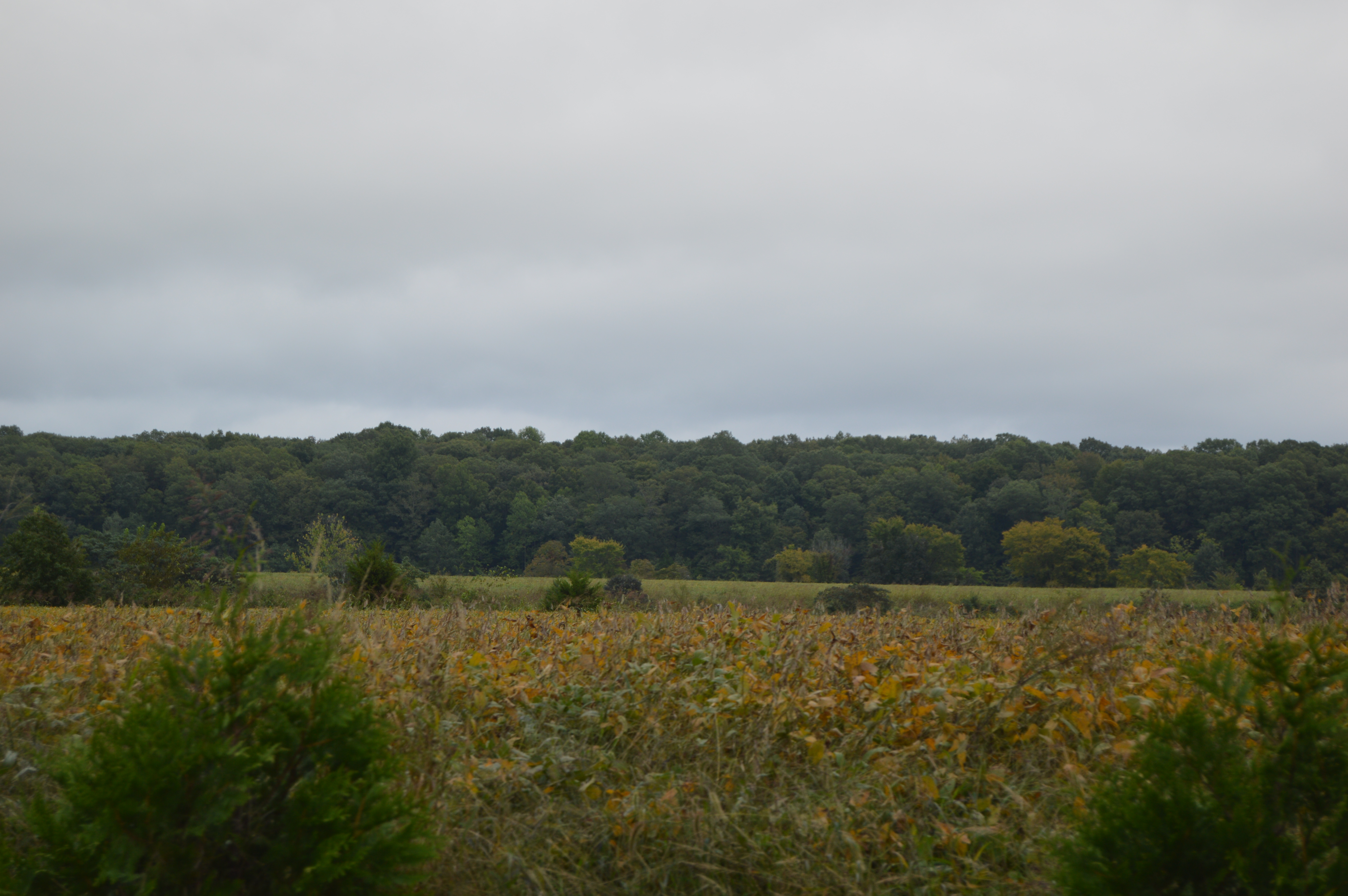
- The marker sits atop this hill

- Location within Virginia Location within the United States
- Nearest city: Richmond, Virginia
- Coordinates: 37°23′42″N 77°16′6″W
- Area: 1 acre (0.40 ha)
- Built: 1771
- NRHP reference No.: 71000981
- VLR No.: 043-0023

Significant dates
- Added to NRHP: September 22, 1971
- Designated VLR: July 7, 1970

The Flood Marker of 1771 is a monument that marks the high point of a flood of the James River on May 27, 1771, that killed around 150 people near Richmond, Virginia. The river reached a flood stage of around 45 feet (14 m) above its normal levels.

It was listed on the National Register of Historic Places in 1971.
