= Walkerton (Glen Allen, Virginia) =

Historic tavern in Virginia, United States

- U.S. National Register of Historic Places
- Virginia Landmarks Register
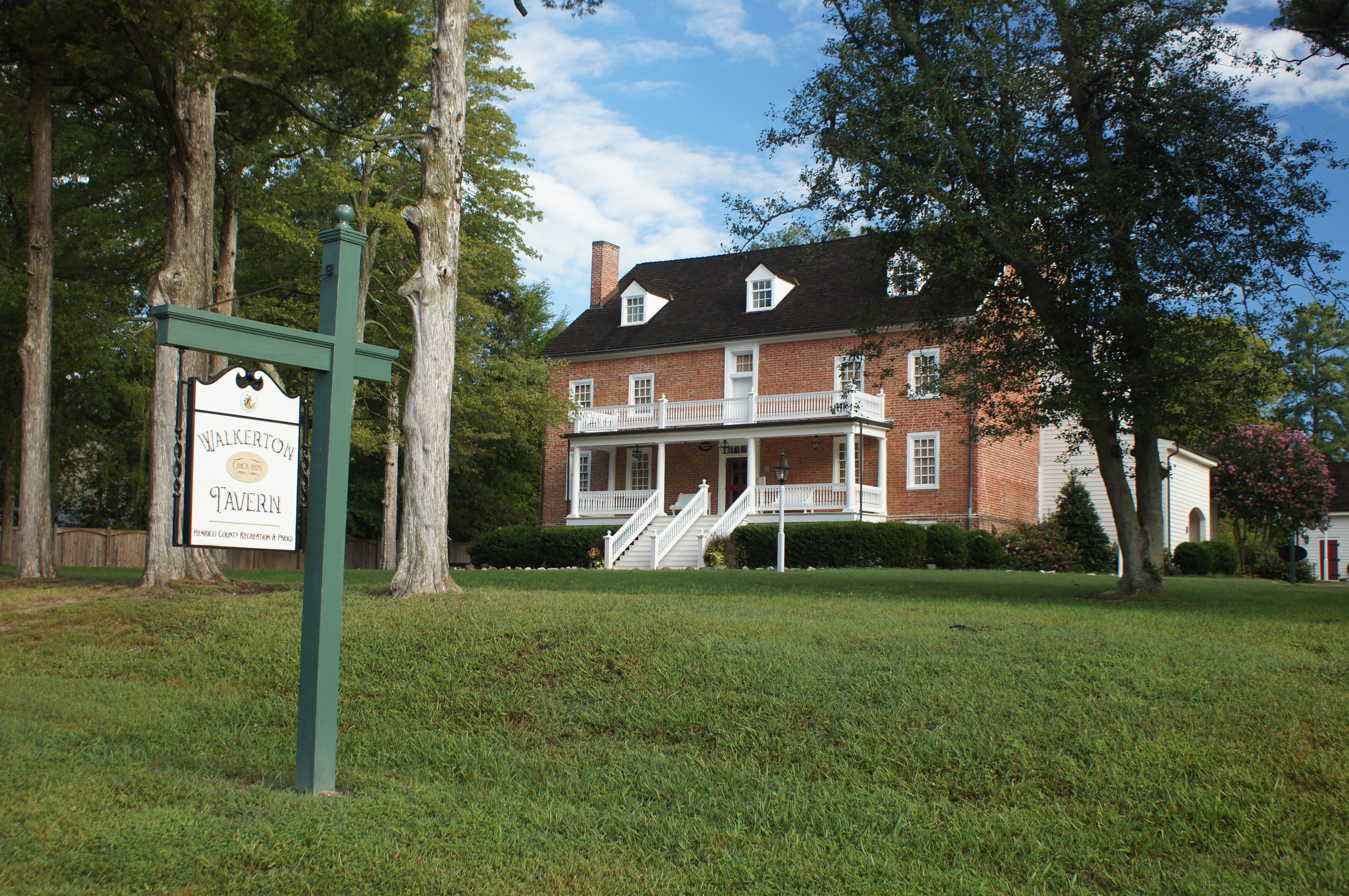

- Location within Virginia Location within the United States
- Location: Mountain Rd., Glen Allen, Virginia
- Coordinates: 37°39′53″N 77°29′38″W
- Area: 1.7 acres (0.69 ha)
- Built: 1825
- NRHP reference No.: 84000676
- VLR No.: 043-0019

Significant dates
- Added to NRHP: December 6, 1984
- Designated VLR: October 16, 1984

Walkerton Tavern was listed on the National Register of Historic Places in 1984; the listing included five contributing buildings and one contributing site.

== History ==
The main structure was built in 1825.

=== Condition at the time of listing ===
At the time of the property's listing on the National Register in 1984, it was occupied and privately owned by George D. Bowles; its accessibility was limited. The property was noted as one of the best-preserved antebellum-era taverns in central Virginia and perhaps "the most impressive building of its type ever erected in Central Virginia."

=== Presidential visit ===
President Barack Obama visited the site and held a rally as part of a campaign tour for his second presidential election.

== Architecture ==
The tavern is a brick structure with 4 stories of living space. It is more architecturally significant than other hostelries in the region of the same period. It has a double set of internal stairways, one set intended for guests and the other for the family and servants.

The main building also has an unusual semi-enclosed gable-end service porch and a unique swinging vertical-board partition, which allowed one of the upstairs rooms to serve as a temporary dance hall.

Some of the features that made the property distinctive were gone as of the time of its 1984 listing, including a caged bar, a plank walkway from the carriage stop to the front porch, three separate detached ice houses, and a stable with stalls for twenty horses.

=== Remaining early outbuildings ===
Some outbuildings remain from the time when the building was initially in operation: these are the servants' quarters, a well-house, a smokehouse, and a carriage-house/outhouse.
