= Redesdale (Richmond, Virginia) =

Historic house in Virginia, United States

- U.S. National Register of Historic Places
- Virginia Landmarks Register
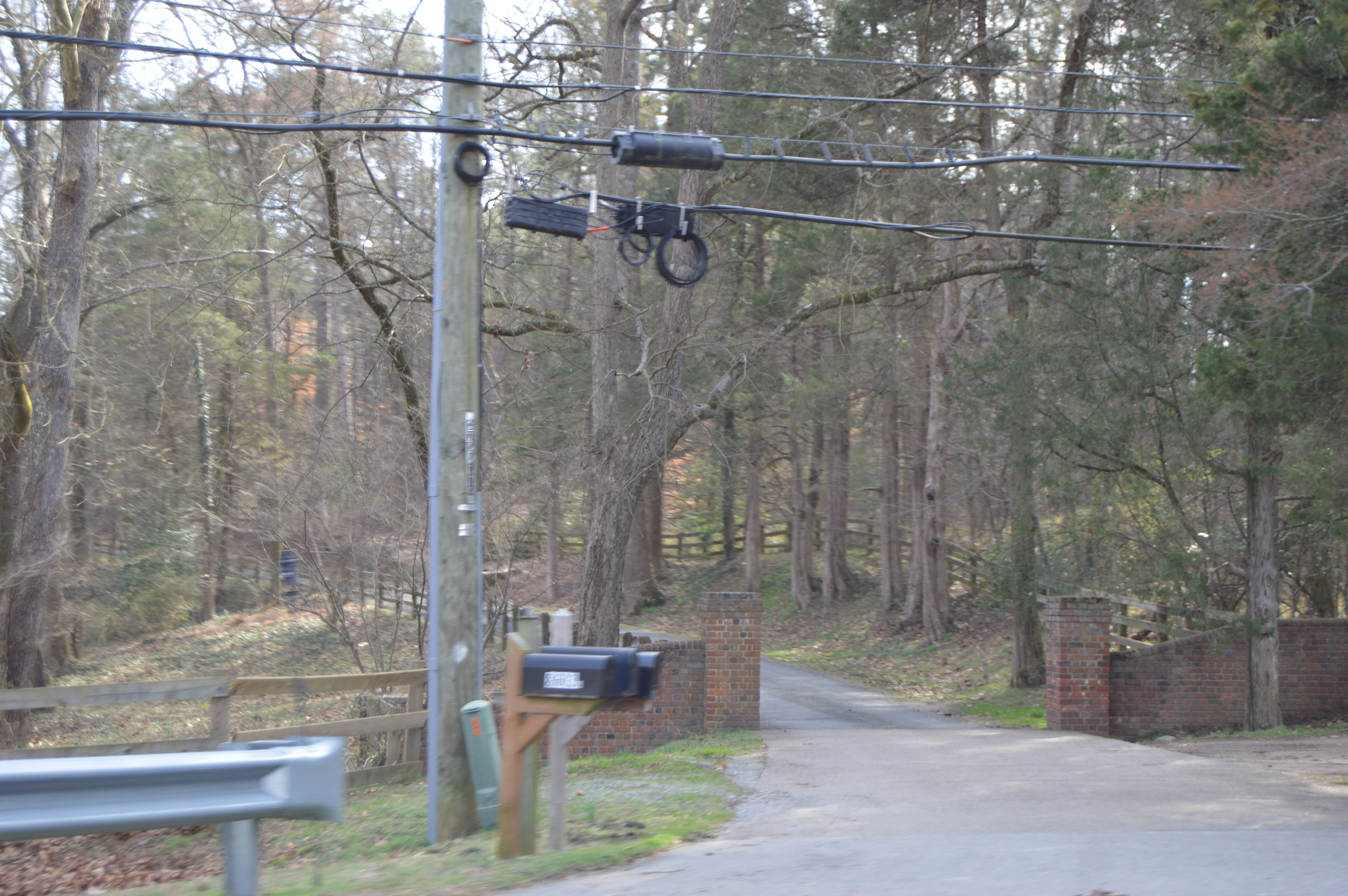
- Property entrance

- Location within Virginia Location within the United States
- Location: 8603 River Rd., near Richmond, Virginia
- Coordinates: 37.565488°N 77.562231°W
- Area: 35 acres (14 ha)
- Built: 1925
- Architect: W.L. Bottomley, C.F. Gillette
- Architectural style: Georgian Revival, Gothic Revival
- NRHP reference No.: 08000071
- VLR No.: 043-0719

Significant dates
- Added to NRHP: February 21, 2008
- Designated VLR: December 15, 2007

Redesdale in Henrico County, Virginia near Richmond, Virginia was built in 1925. It was listed on the National Register of Historic Places in 2008. The listing included a 35-acre (14 ha) area with 4 contributing buildings, 3 contributing sites and 3 contributing structures.

It was designed by William Lawrence Bottomley, a society architect.
