= Battle of Chancellorsville =

1863 American Civil War battle

- Part of the American Civil War
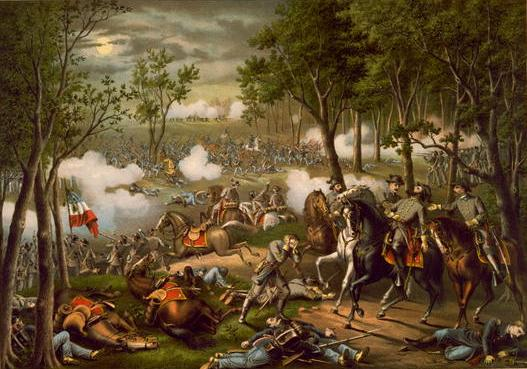
- Battle of Chancellorsville, by Kurz and Allison, 1889 (Apocryphal painting depicts the wounding of Confederate Lt. Gen. Stonewall Jackson on May 2, 1863)
Date	April 30 – May 6, 1863
Location	Spotsylvania County, Virginia 38.3105°N 77.6484°W
Result	Confederate victory

Belligerents
United States (Union)	Confederate States

Commanders and leaders
Joseph Hooker	Robert E. Lee

Units involved
Army of the Potomac	Army of Northern Virginia

Strength
Chancellorsville campaign: 133,868 ("present for duty equipped"): Chancellorsville: c. 106,000 (Army of the Potomac minus VI Corps-2nd Div./II Corps); 2nd Fredericksburg/Salem Church: c. 28,000 (VI Corps; 2nd Div./II Corps)	60,298

Casualties and losses
Chancellorsville campaign: 17,287 (1,606 killed 9,762 wounded 6,919 captured/missing): Chancellorsville: 12,145 (1,082 killed 6,849 wounded 5,214 captured/missing); 2nd Fredericksburg/Salem Church: 4,700 (493 killed 2,710 wounded 1,497 captured/missing); Minor skirmishes: 442 (31 killed 203 wounded 208 captured/missing)	12,764 (1,665 killed 9,081 wounded 2,018 captured/missing)

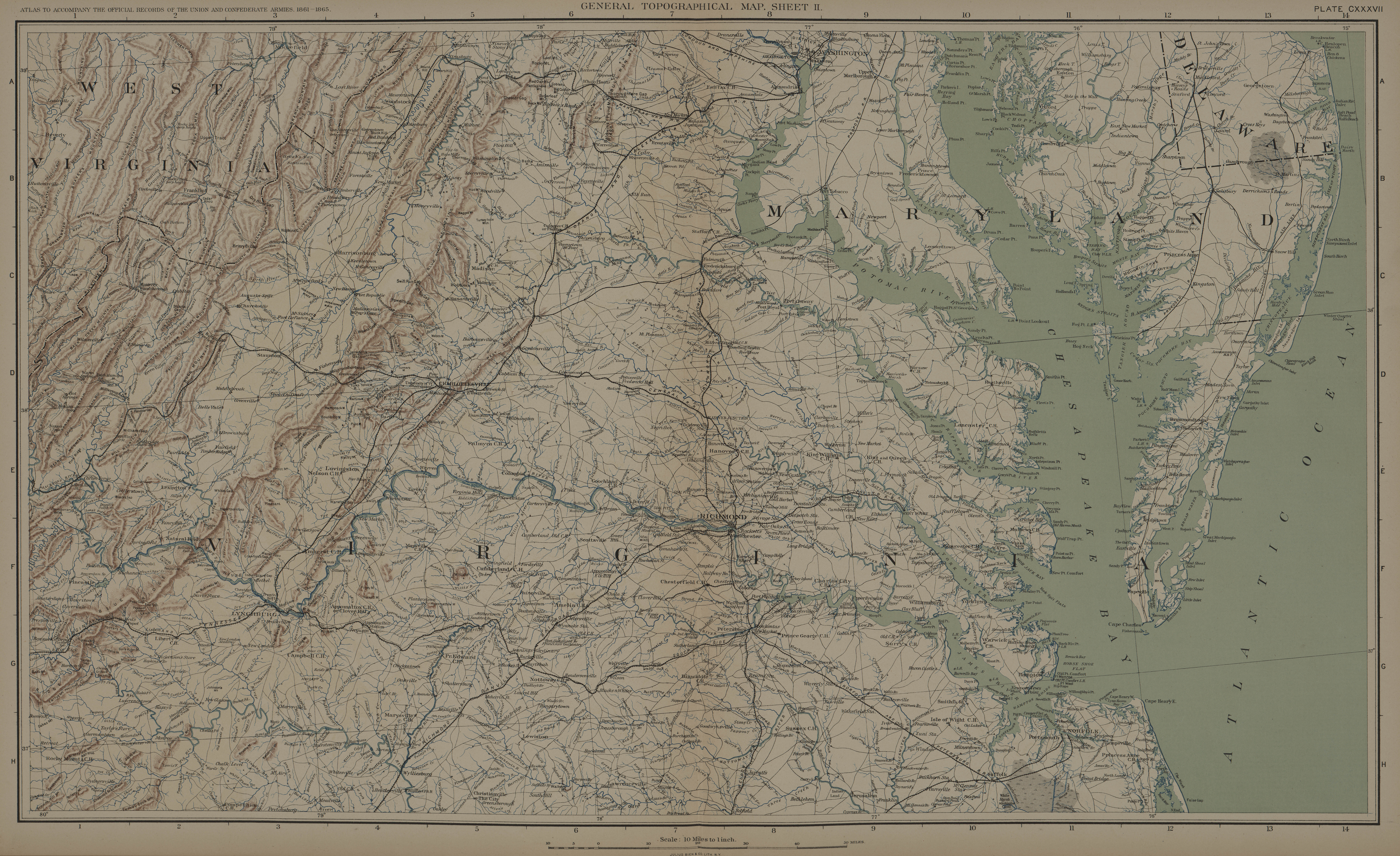
Map of Virginia, 1863

The Battle of Chancellorsville, April 30 – May 6, 1863, was a major battle of the American Civil War (1861–1865), and the principal engagement of the Chancellorsville campaign.

Confederate General Robert E. Lee's risky decision to divide his army in the presence of a much larger enemy force resulted in a significant Confederate victory, described by some historians as Lee's "perfect battle". The victory, a product of Lee's audacity and Union general Joseph Hooker's timid decision-making, was tempered by heavy casualties, including Lt. Gen. Thomas J. "Stonewall" Jackson. Jackson was hit by friendly fire, requiring his left arm to be amputated. He died of pneumonia eight days later, a loss that Lee likened to losing his right arm.

The two armies had faced off against each other at Fredericksburg during the winter of 1862–1863. The Chancellorsville campaign began when Hooker secretly moved the bulk of his army up the left bank of the Rappahannock River, then crossed it on the morning of April 27, 1863. Union cavalry under Maj. Gen. George Stoneman began a long-distance raid against Lee's supply lines at about the same time. Crossing the Rapidan River via Germanna and Ely's Fords, the Federal infantry concentrated near Chancellorsville on April 30. Combined with the Union force facing Fredericksburg, Hooker planned a double envelopment, attacking Lee from both his front and rear.

On May 1, Hooker advanced from Chancellorsville toward Lee, but the Confederate general split his army in the face of superior numbers, leaving a small force at Fredericksburg to deter Maj. Gen. John Sedgwick from advancing, while he attacked Hooker's advance with about four-fifths of his army. Despite the objections of his subordinates, Hooker withdrew his men to the defensive lines around Chancellorsville, ceding the initiative to Lee. On May 2, Lee divided his army again, sending Stonewall Jackson's entire corps on a flanking march that routed the Union XI Corps. While performing a personal reconnaissance in advance of his line, Jackson was wounded by fire after dark from his own men, and cavalry commander Maj. Gen. J. E. B. Stuart temporarily replaced him as corps commander.

The fiercest fighting of the battle—and the second bloodiest day of the Civil War—occurred on May 3 as Lee launched multiple attacks against the Union position at Chancellorsville, resulting in heavy losses on both sides and the pulling back of Hooker's main army. That same day, Sedgwick advanced across the Rappahannock River, defeated the small Confederate force at Marye's Heights in the Second Battle of Fredericksburg, and then moved to the west. The Confederates fought a successful delaying action at the Battle of Salem Church. On the 4th, Lee turned his back on Hooker and attacked Sedgwick, and drove him back to Banks' Ford, surrounding them on three sides. Sedgwick withdrew across the ford early on May 5. Lee turned back to confront Hooker who withdrew the remainder of his army across U.S. Ford the night of May 5–6.

The campaign ended on May 7 when Stoneman's cavalry reached Union lines east of Richmond. Both armies resumed their previous position across the Rappahannock from each other at Fredericksburg. With the loss of Jackson, Lee reorganized his army, and flush with victory began what was to become the Gettysburg campaign a month later.

== Background ==
=== Union attempts against Richmond ===
In the Eastern Theater of the American Civil War, the objective of the Union had been to advance and seize the Confederate capital, Richmond, Virginia. In the first two years of the war, four major attempts had failed: the first foundered just miles away from Washington, D.C., at the First Battle of Bull Run (First Manassas) in July 1861. Maj. Gen. George B. McClellan's Peninsula Campaign took an amphibious approach, landing his Army of the Potomac on the Virginia Peninsula in the spring of 1862 and coming within 6 miles (9.7 km) of Richmond before being turned back by Gen. Robert E. Lee in the Seven Days Battles.

That summer, Maj. Gen. John Pope's Army of Virginia was defeated at the Second Battle of Bull Run. Finally, in December 1862, Maj. Gen. Ambrose Burnside's Army of the Potomac attempted to reach Richmond by way of Fredericksburg, Virginia, but was defeated at the Battle of Fredericksburg.

=== Shakeup in the Army of the Potomac ===
In January 1863, the Army of the Potomac, following the Battle of Fredericksburg and the humiliating Mud March, suffered from rising desertions and plunging morale. Maj. Gen. Ambrose Burnside decided to conduct a mass purge of the Army of the Potomac's leadership, eliminating a number of generals who he felt were responsible for the disaster at Fredericksburg. In reality, he had no power to dismiss anyone without the approval of Congress.

Predictably, Burnside's purge went nowhere, and he offered President Abraham Lincoln his resignation from command of the Army of the Potomac. He even offered to resign entirely from the Army, but the president persuaded him to stay, transferring him to the Western Theater, where he became commander of the Department of the Ohio. Burnside's former command, the IX Corps, was transferred to the Virginia Peninsula, a movement that prompted the Confederates to detach troops from Lee's army under Lt. Gen. James Longstreet, a decision that would be consequential in the upcoming campaign.

Abraham Lincoln had become convinced that the appropriate objective for his Eastern army was the army of Robert E. Lee, not any geographic features such as a capital city, but he and his generals knew that the most reliable way to bring Lee to a decisive battle was to threaten his capital. Lincoln tried a fifth time with a new general on January 25, 1863—Maj. Gen. Joseph Hooker, a man with a pugnacious reputation who had performed well in previous subordinate commands.

With Burnside's departure, Maj. Gen. William B. Franklin left as well. Franklin had been a staunch supporter of George B. McClellan and refused to serve under Hooker, because he disliked him personally and also because he was senior to Hooker in rank. Maj. Gen. Edwin V. Sumner stepped down due to old age (he was 65) and poor health. He was reassigned to a command in Missouri, but died before he could assume it. Brig. Gen. Daniel Butterfield was reassigned from command of the V Corps to be Hooker's chief of staff.

Hooker embarked on a much-needed reorganization of the army, doing away with Burnside's grand division system, which had proved unwieldy; he also no longer had sufficient senior officers on hand that he could trust to command multi-corps operations. He organized the cavalry into a separate corps under the command of Brig. Gen. George Stoneman (who had commanded the III Corps at Fredericksburg). But while he concentrated the cavalry into a single organization, he dispersed his artillery battalions to the control of the infantry division commanders, removing the coordinating influence of the army's artillery chief, Brig. Gen. Henry J. Hunt.

Hooker established a reputation as an outstanding administrator and restored the morale of his soldiers, which had plummeted to a new low under Burnside. Among his changes were fixes to the daily diet of the troops, camp sanitary changes, improvements and accountability of the quartermaster system, addition of and monitoring of company cooks, several hospital reforms, an improved furlough system, orders to stem rising desertion, improved drills, and stronger officer training.

=== Intelligence and plans ===
My plans are perfect. May God have mercy on General Lee for I will have none.

— Maj. Gen. Joseph Hooker

Hooker took advantage of improved military intelligence about the positioning and capabilities of the opposing army, superior to that available to his predecessors in army command. His chief of staff, Butterfield, commissioned Col. George H. Sharpe from the 120th New York Infantry to organize a new Bureau of Military Information in the Army of the Potomac, part of the provost marshal function under Brig. Gen. Marsena R. Patrick. Previously, intelligence gatherers, such as Allan Pinkerton and his detective agency, gathered information only by interrogating prisoners, deserters, "contrabands" (slaves), and refugees.

The new BMI added other sources including infantry and cavalry reconnaissance, spies, scouts, signal stations, and an aerial balloon corps. As he received the more complete information correlated from these additional sources, Hooker realized that if he were to avoid the bloodbath of direct frontal attacks, which were features of the battles of Antietam and, more recently, Fredericksburg, he could not succeed in his crossing of the Rappahannock "except by stratagem."

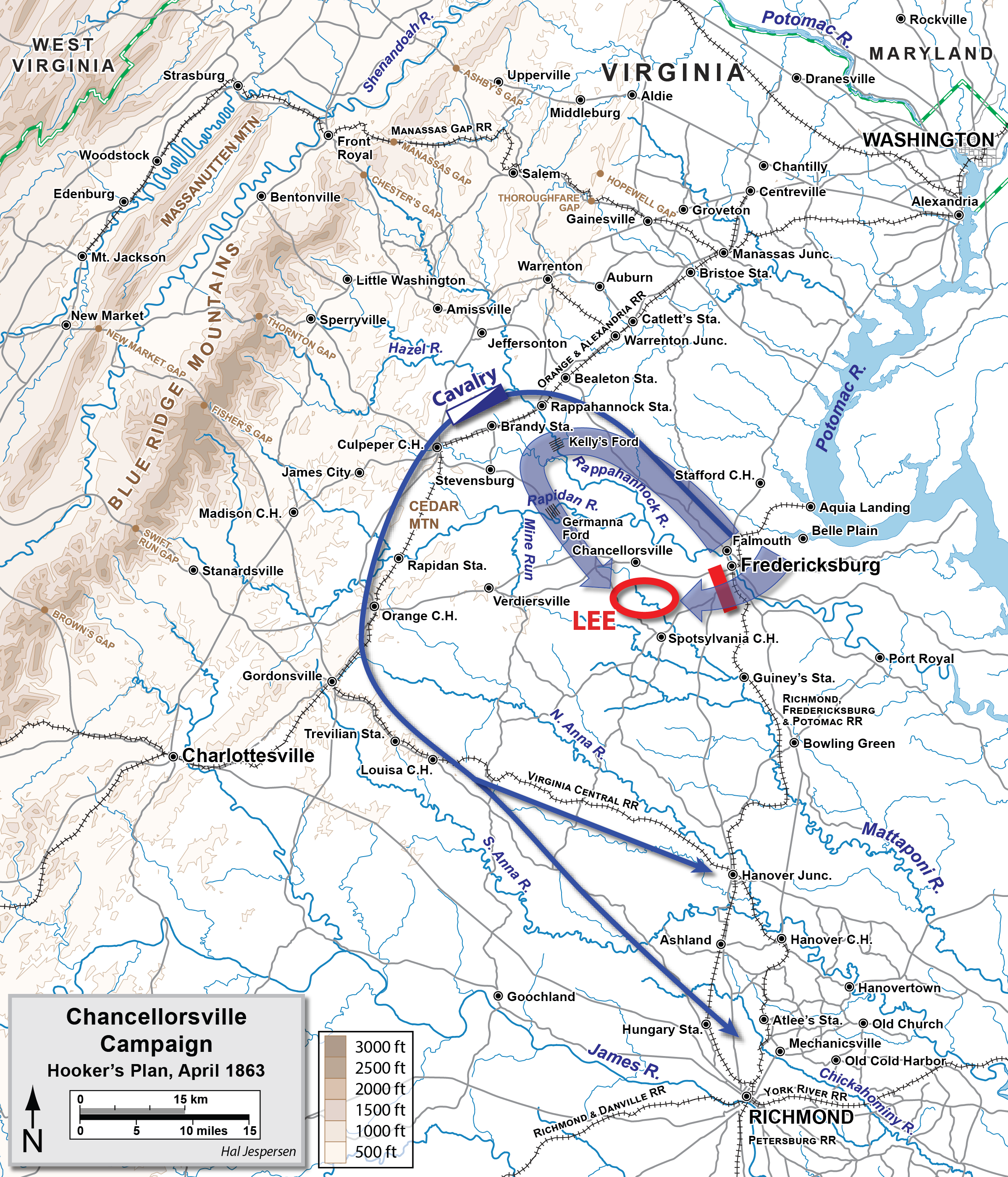
Hooker's plan for the Chancellorsville campaign Confederate Union

Hooker's army faced Lee across the Rappahannock from its winter quarters in Falmouth and around Fredericksburg. Hooker developed a strategy that was, on paper, superior to those of his predecessors. He planned to send his 10,000 cavalrymen under Maj. Gen. George Stoneman to cross the Rappahannock far upstream and raid deep into the Confederate rear areas, destroying crucial supply depots along the railroad from the Confederate capital in Richmond to Fredericksburg, which would cut Lee's lines of communication and supply.

Hooker reasoned that Lee would react to this threat by abandoning his fortified positions on the Rappahannock and withdrawing toward his capital. At that time, Hooker's infantry would cross the Rappahannock in pursuit, attacking Lee when he was moving and vulnerable. Stoneman attempted to execute this turning movement on April 13, but heavy rains made the river crossing site at Sulphur Spring impassable. President Lincoln lamented, "I greatly fear it is another failure already." Hooker was forced to create a new plan for a meeting with Lincoln, Secretary of War Edwin M. Stanton, and general in chief Henry W. Halleck in Aquia on April 19.

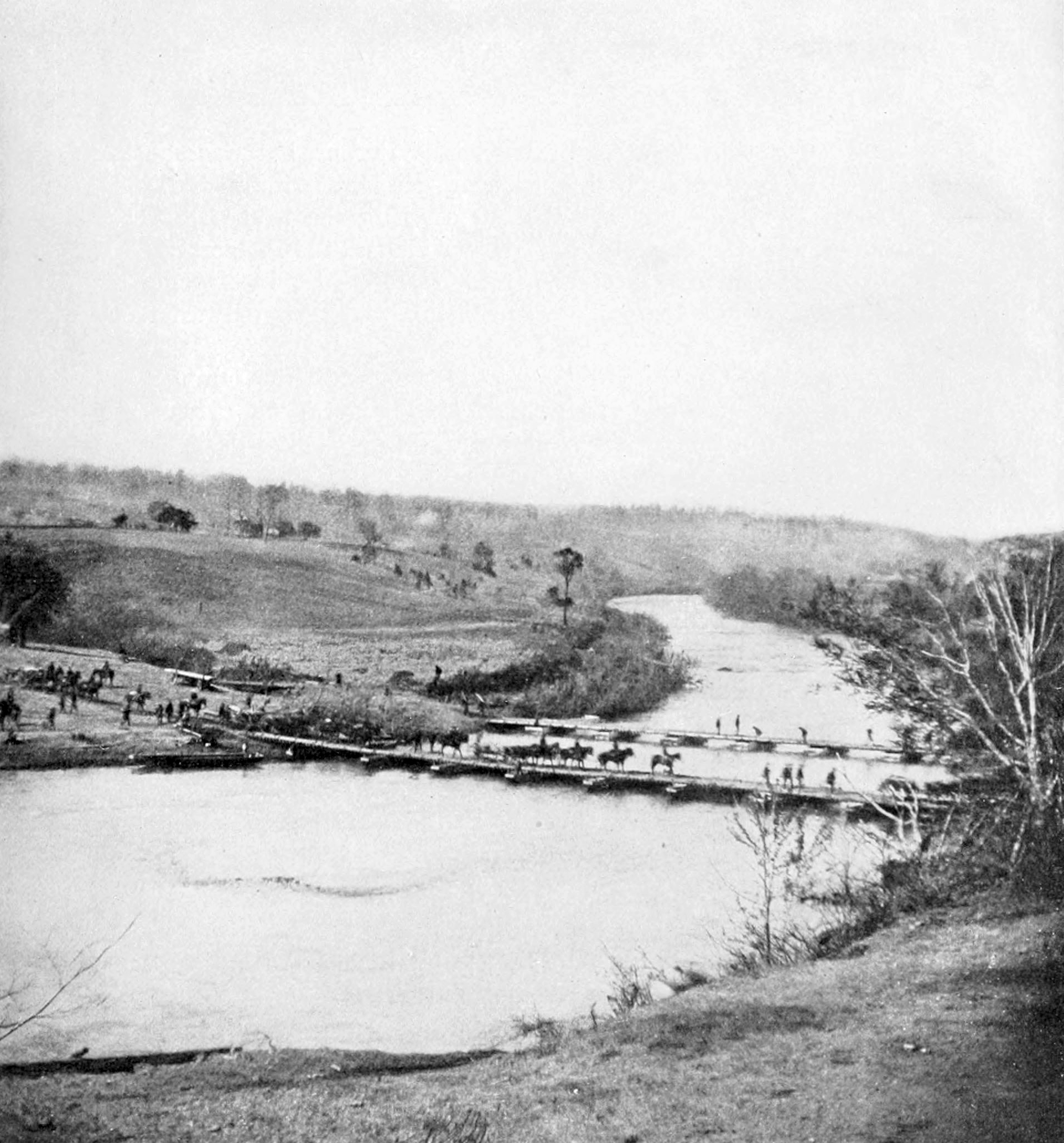
Troops crossing the Rapidan at Germanna Ford

Hooker's second plan was to launch both his cavalry and infantry simultaneously in a bold double envelopment of Lee's army. Stoneman's cavalry would make a second attempt at its deep strategic raid, but at the same time, 42,000 men in three corps (V, XI, XII Corps) would stealthily march to cross the Rappahannock upriver at Kelly's Ford. They would then proceed south and cross the Rapidan at Germanna and Ely's Ford, concentrate at the Chancellorsville crossroads, and attack Lee's army from the west.

While they were under way, 10,000 men in two divisions from the II Corps would cross at the U.S. Ford and join with the V Corps in pushing the Confederates away from the river. The second half of the double envelopment was to come from the east: 40,000 men in two corps (I and VI Corps, under the overall command of John Sedgwick) would cross the Rappahannock below Fredericksburg and threaten to attack Stonewall Jackson's position on the Confederate right flank.

The remaining 25,000 men (III Corps and one division of the II Corps) would remain visible in their camps at Falmouth to divert Confederate attention from the turning movement. Hooker anticipated that Lee would either be forced to retreat, in which case he would be vigorously pursued, or he would be forced to attack the Union Army on unfavorable terrain.

One of the defining characteristics of the battlefield was a dense woodland south of the Rapidan known locally as the "Wilderness of Spotsylvania". The area had once been an open broadleaf forest, but during colonial times the trees were gradually cut down to make charcoal for local pig iron furnaces. When the supply of wood was exhausted, the furnaces were abandoned and secondary forest growth developed, creating a dense mass of brambles, thickets, vines, and low-lying vegetation.

Catharine Furnace, abandoned in the 1840s, had recently been reactivated to produce iron for the Confederate war effort. This area was largely unsuitable for the deployment of artillery and the control of large infantry formations, which would nullify some of the Union advantage in military power. It was important for Hooker's plan that his men move quickly out of this area and attack Lee in the open ground to the east. There were three primary roads available for this west-to-east movement: the Orange Plank Road, the Orange Turnpike, and the River Road.

The Confederate dispositions were as follows: the Rappahannock line at Fredericksburg was occupied by Longstreet's First Corps division of Lafayette McLaws on Marye's Heights, with Jackson's entire Second Corps to their right. Early's division was at Prospect Hill and the divisions of Rodes, Hill, and Colston extended the Confederate right flank along the river almost to Skinker's Neck. The other division present from Longstreet's Corps, Anderson's, guarded the river crossings on the left flank. Stuart's cavalry was largely in Culpeper County near Kelly's Ford, beyond the infantry's left flank.

=== Initial movements ===
==== April 27–30: Movement to battle ====
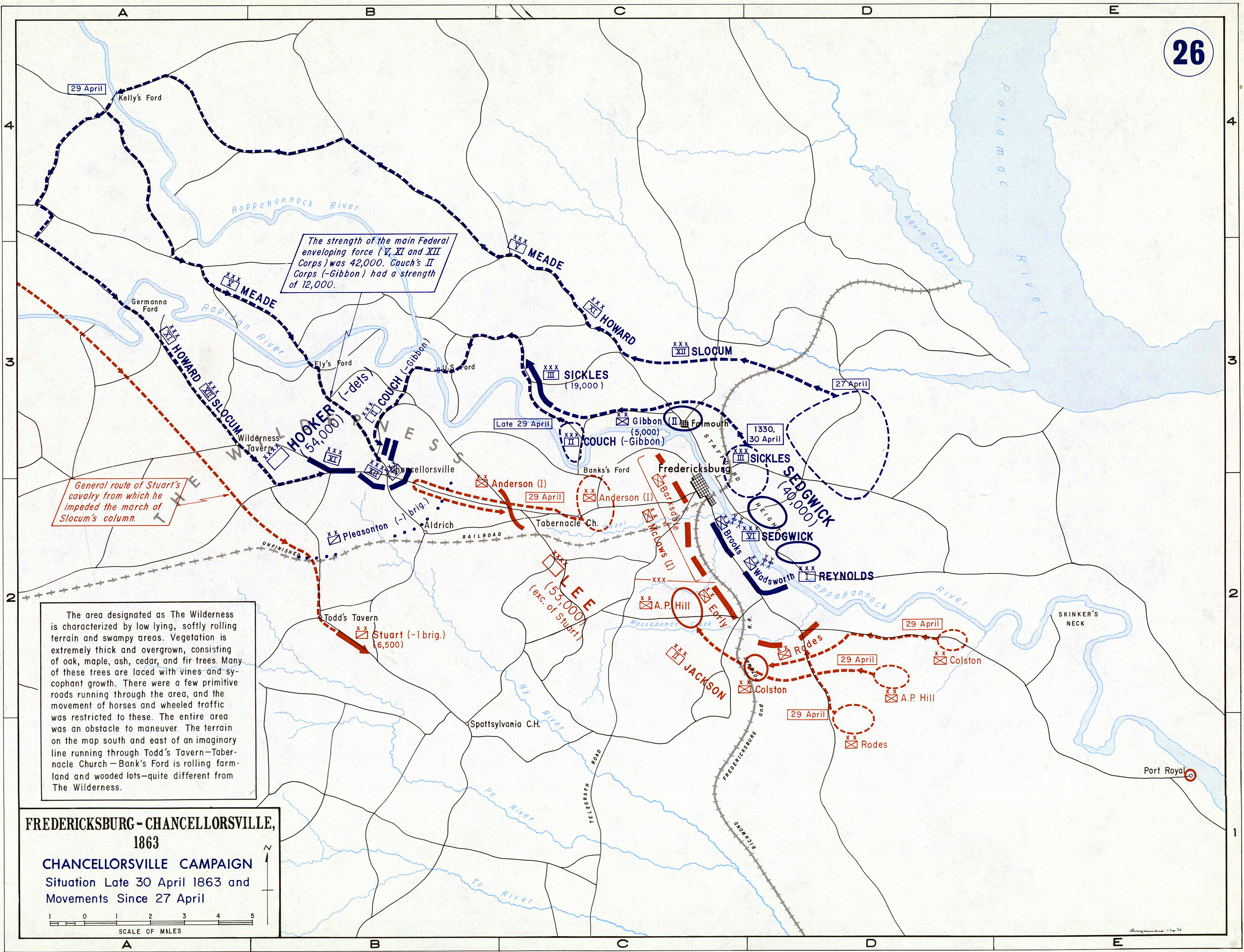
Battle of Chancellorsville, Situation Late 30 April 1863 and Movements since 27 April

On April 27–28, the initial three corps of the Army of the Potomac began their march under the leadership of Slocum. They crossed the Rappahannock and Rapidan rivers as planned and began to concentrate on April 30 around the hamlet of Chancellorsville, which was little more than a single large, brick mansion at the junction of the Orange Turnpike and Orange Plank Road. Built in the early 19th century, it had been used as an inn on the turnpike for many years, but now served as a home for the Frances Chancellor family. Some of the family remained in the house during the battle.

Hooker arrived late in the afternoon on April 30 and made the mansion his headquarters. Stoneman's cavalry began on April 30 its second attempt to reach Lee's rear areas. Two divisions of II Corps crossed at U.S. Ford on April 30 without opposition. By dawn on April 29, pontoon bridges spanned the Rappahannock south of Fredericksburg and Sedgwick's force began to cross.

Pleased with the success of the operation so far, and realizing that the Confederates were not vigorously opposing the river crossings, Hooker ordered Sickles to begin the movement of the III Corps from Falmouth the night of April 30 – May 1. By May 1, Hooker had approximately 70,000 men concentrated in and around Chancellorsville.

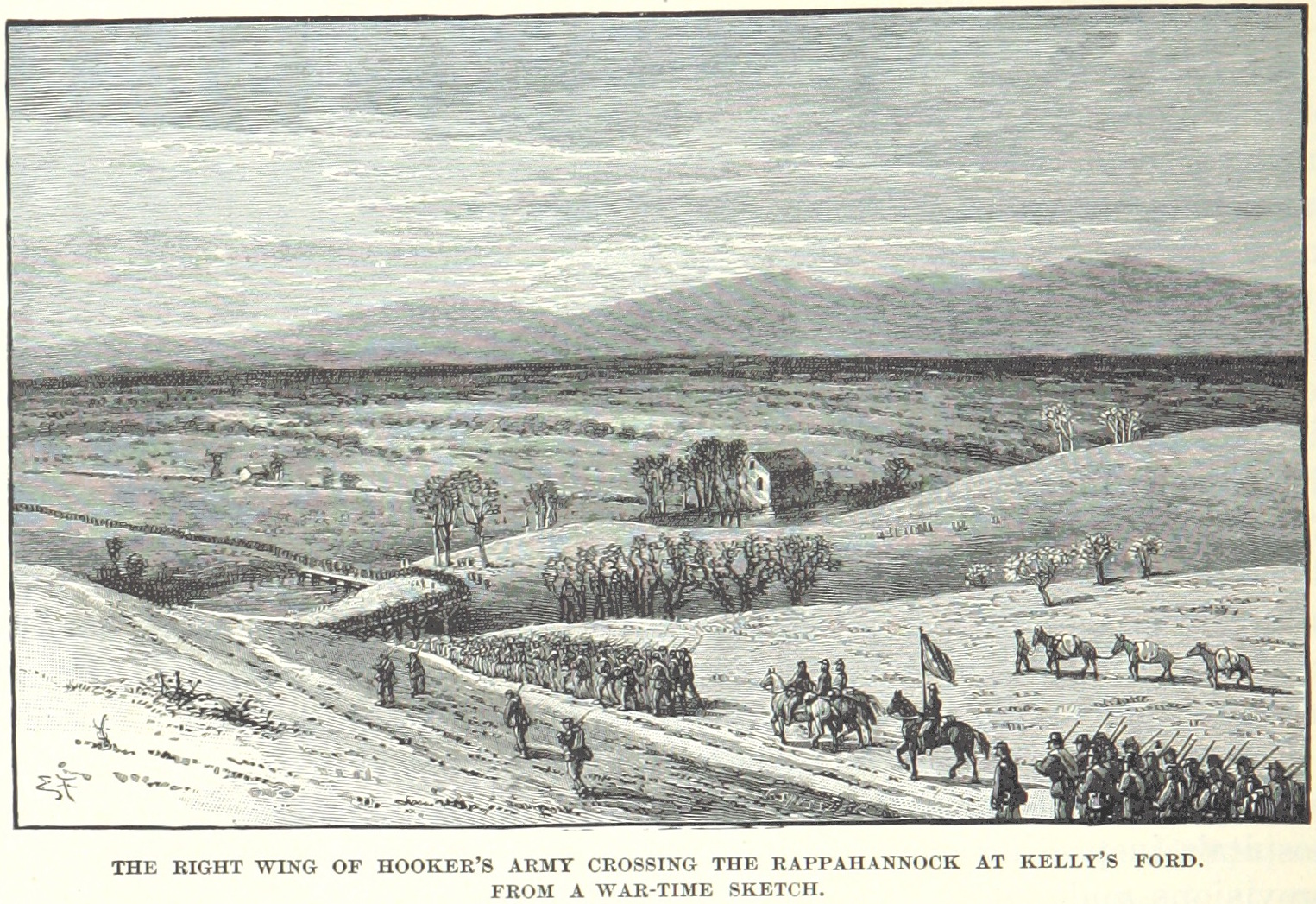
Troops on Hooker's right cross the Rappahannock, by Edwin Forbes

In his Fredericksburg headquarters, Lee was initially in the dark about the Union intentions and he suspected that the main column under Slocum was heading towards Gordonsville. Jeb Stuart's cavalry was cut off at first by Stoneman's departure on April 30, but they were soon able to move freely around the army's flanks on their reconnaissance missions after almost all their Union counterparts had left the area.

As Stuart's intelligence information about the Union river crossings began to arrive, Lee did not react as Hooker had anticipated. He decided to violate one of the generally accepted principles of war and divide his force in the face of a superior enemy, hoping that aggressive action would allow him to attack and defeat a portion of Hooker's army before it could be fully concentrated against him. He became convinced that Sedgwick's force would demonstrate against him, but not become a serious threat, so he ordered about four-fifths of his army to meet the challenge from Chancellorsville. He left behind a brigade under Brig. Gen. William Barksdale on heavily fortified Marye's Heights behind Fredericksburg and one division under Maj. Gen. Jubal A. Early, on Prospect Hill south of the town.

These roughly 11,000 men and 56 guns would attempt to resist any advance by Sedgwick's 40,000. He ordered Stonewall Jackson to march west and link up with Maj. Gen. Richard H. Anderson's division, which had pulled back from the river crossings they were guarding and began digging earthworks on a north–south line between the Zoan and Tabernacle churches. McLaws's division was ordered from Fredericksburg to join Anderson. This would amass 40,000 men to confront Hooker's movement east from Chancellorsville. Heavy fog along the Rappahannock masked some of these westward movements and Sedgwick chose to wait until he could determine the enemy's intentions.

== Opposing forces ==
=== Union ===
Key commanders (Army of the Potomac)
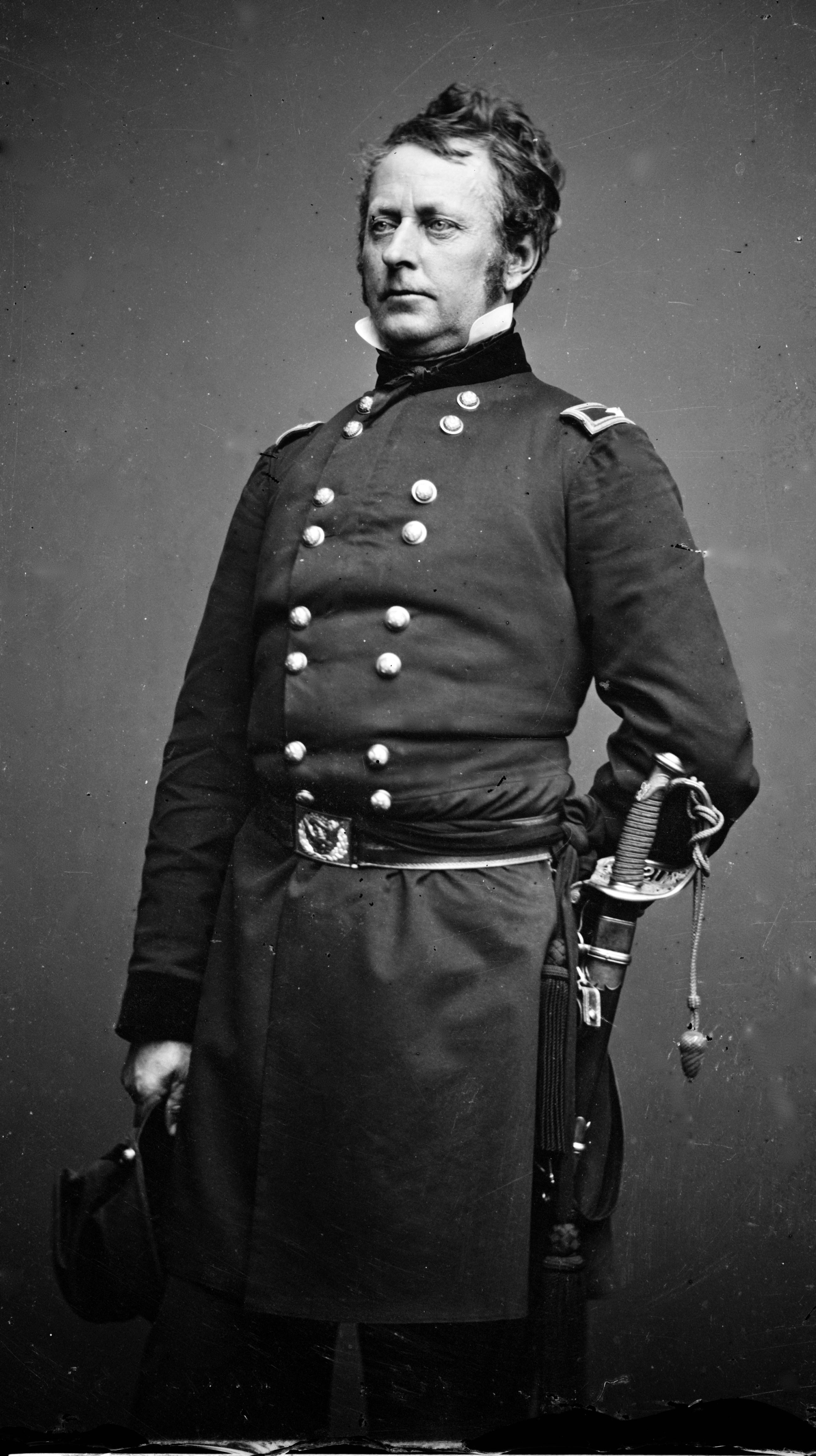
Maj. Gen.
Joseph Hooker,
(Commanding)

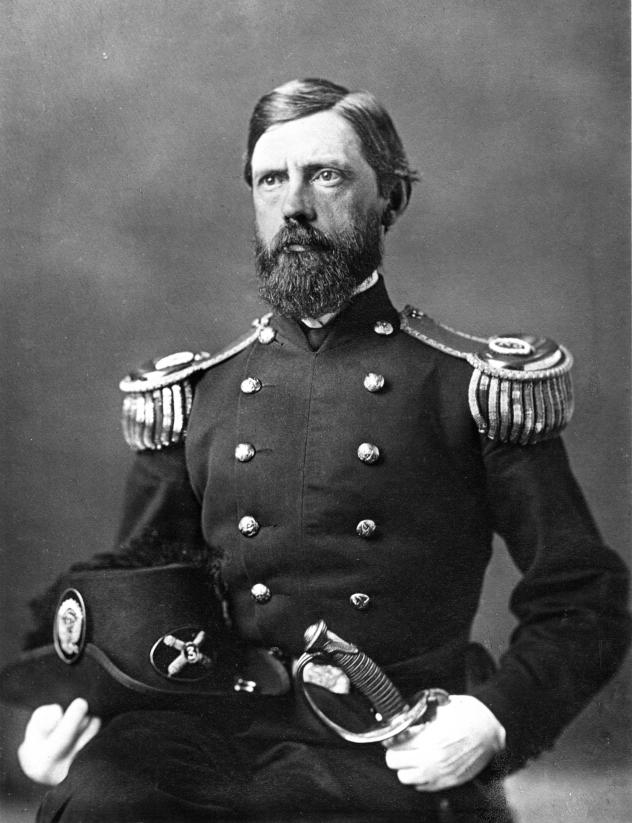
Maj. Gen.
John F. Reynolds,
I Corps

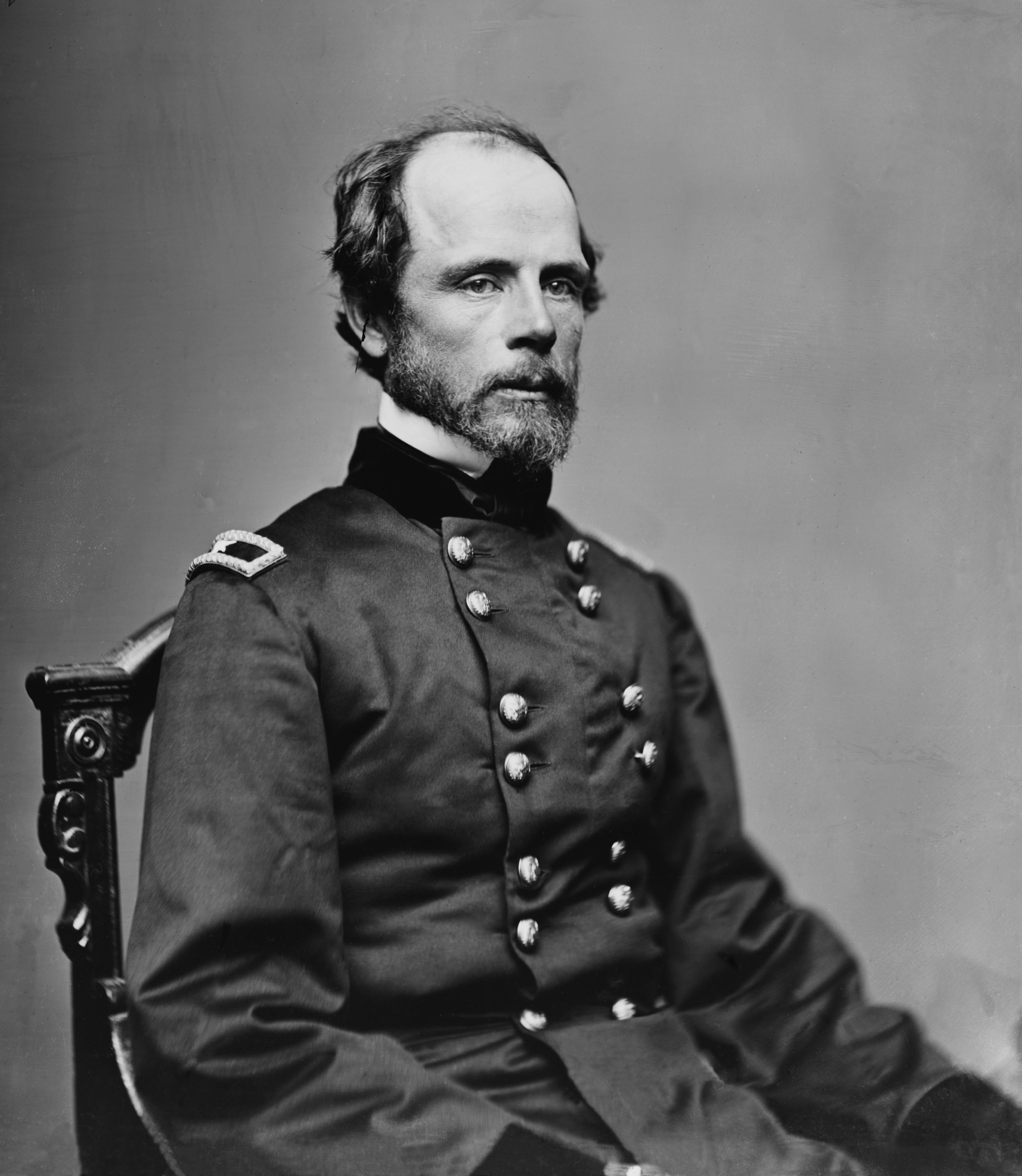
Maj. Gen.
Darius N. Couch,
II Corps

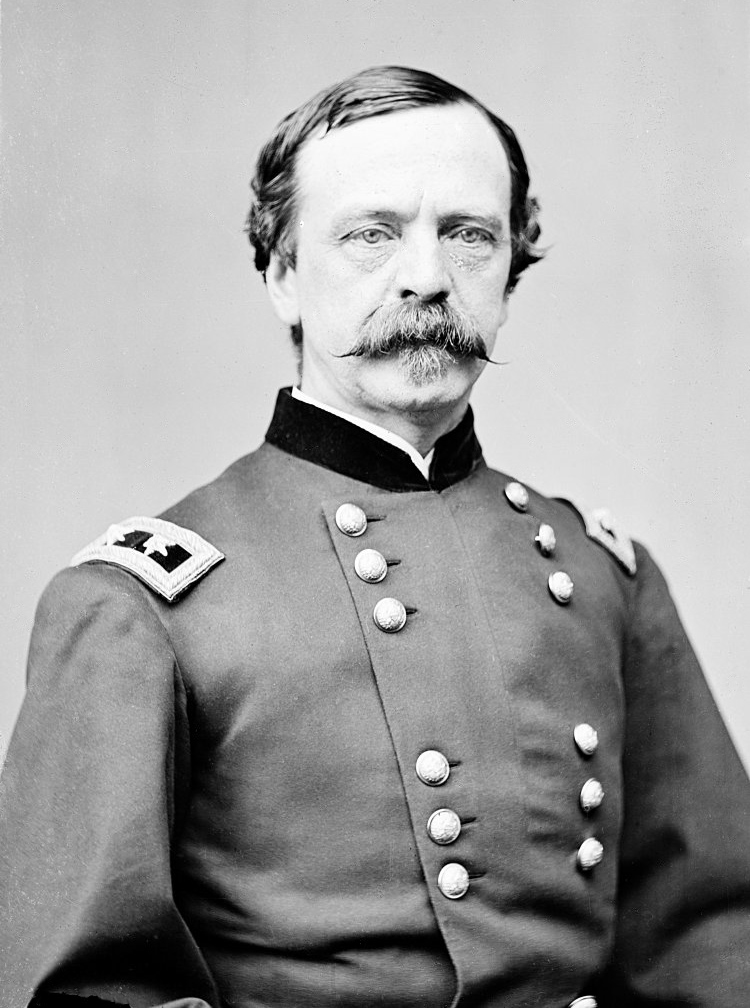
Maj. Gen.
Daniel Sickles,
III Corps

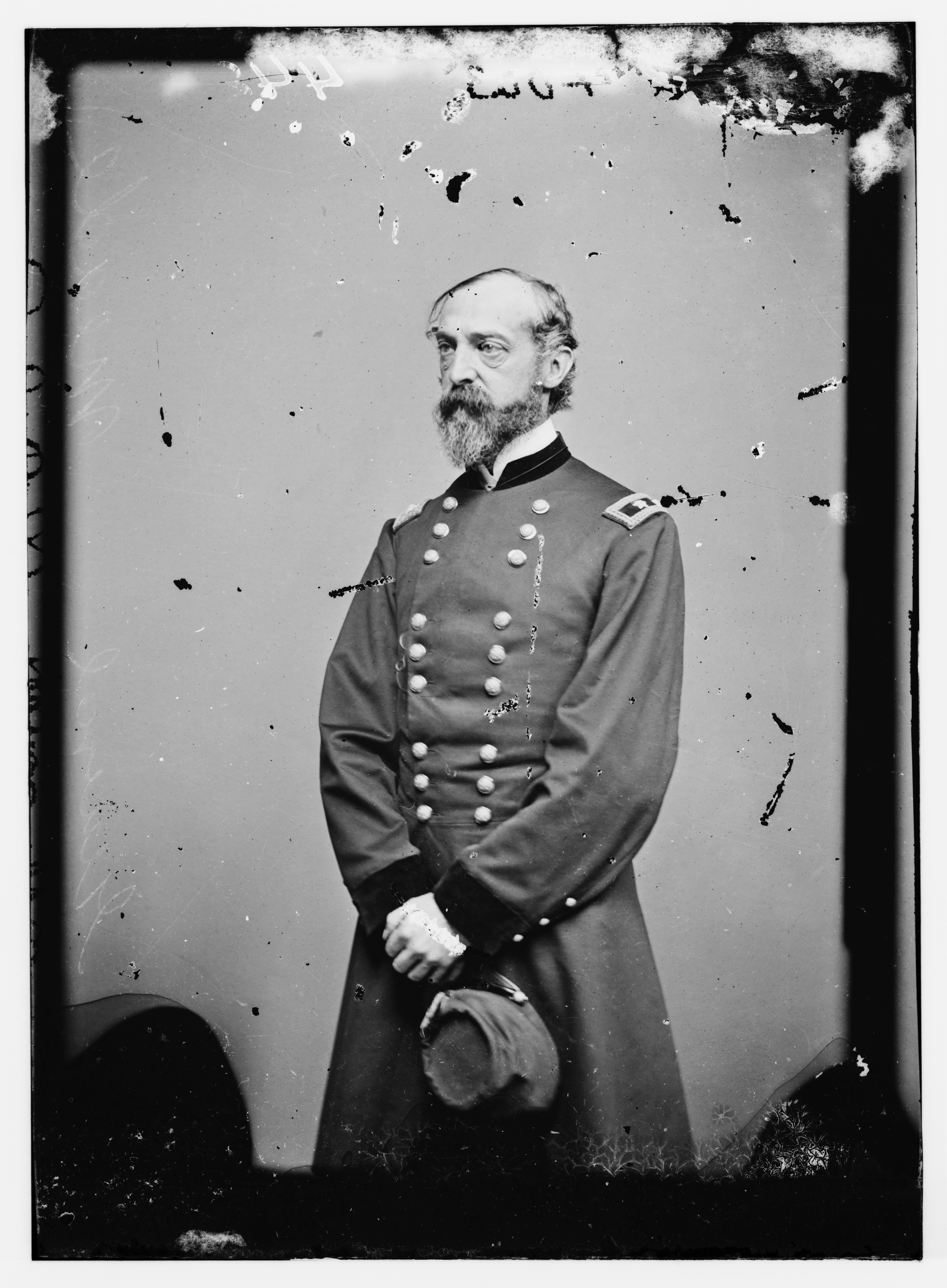
Maj. Gen.
George G. Meade,
V Corps

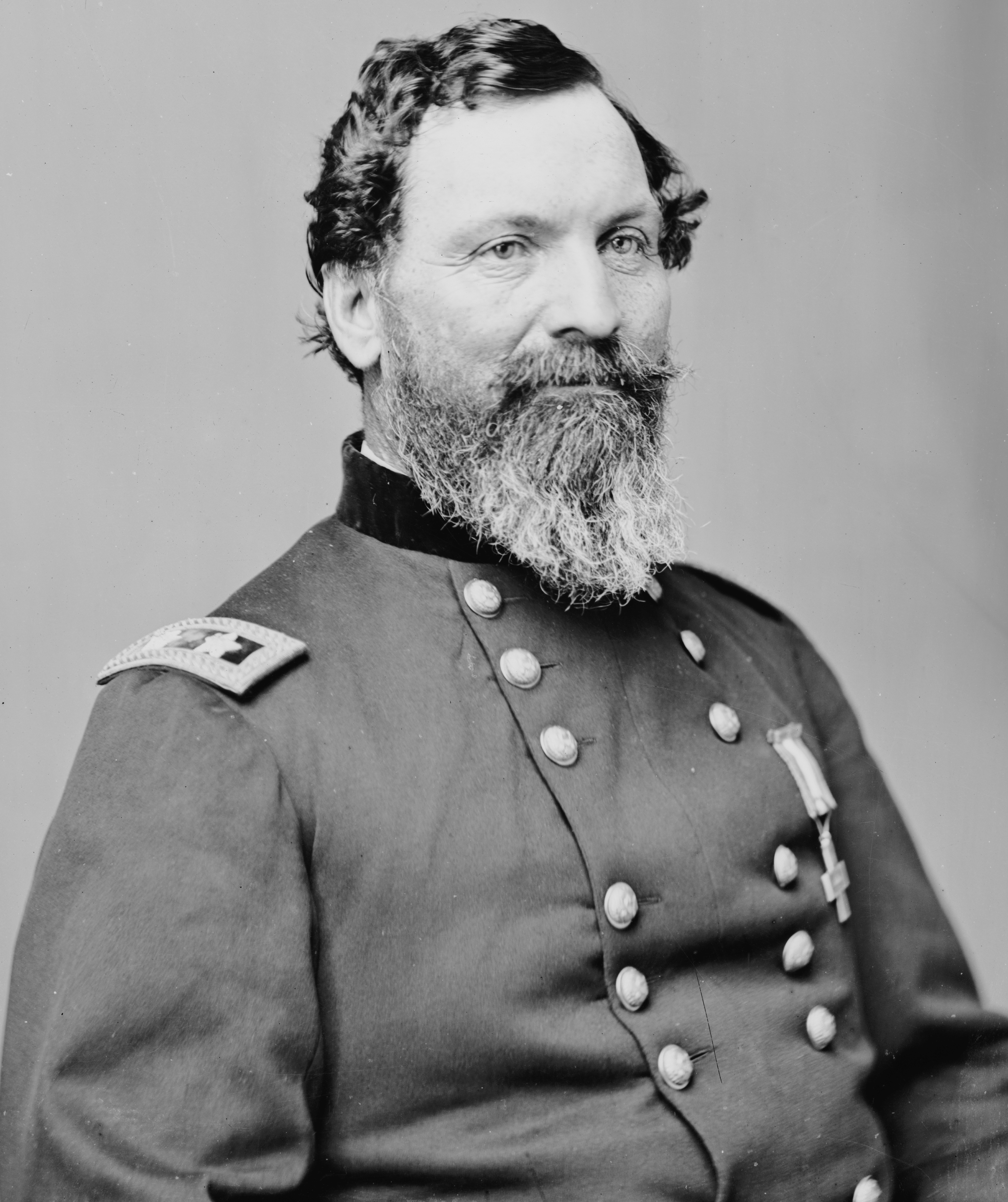
Maj. Gen.
John Sedgwick,
VI Corps

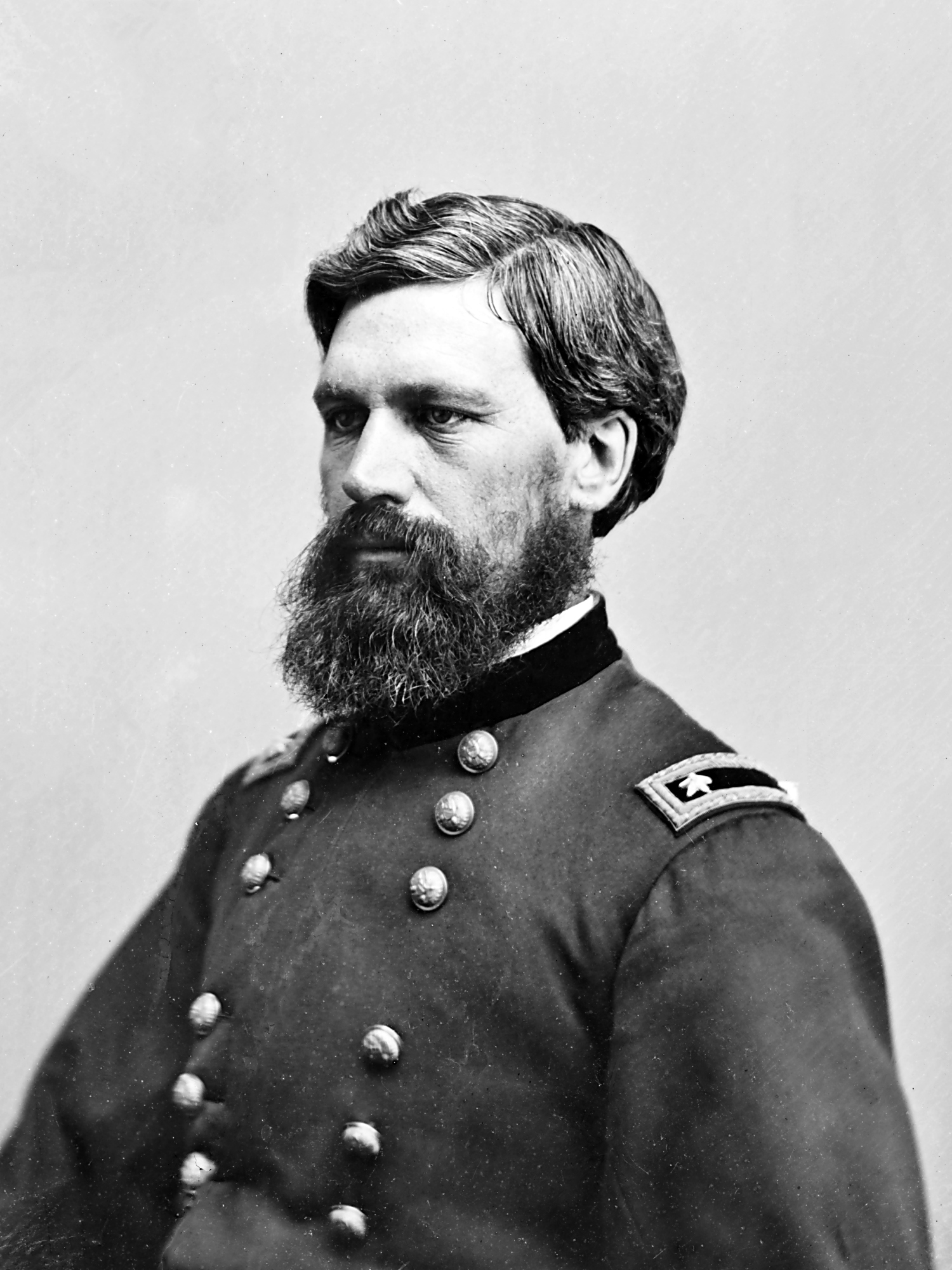
Maj. Gen.
Oliver O. Howard,
XI Corps

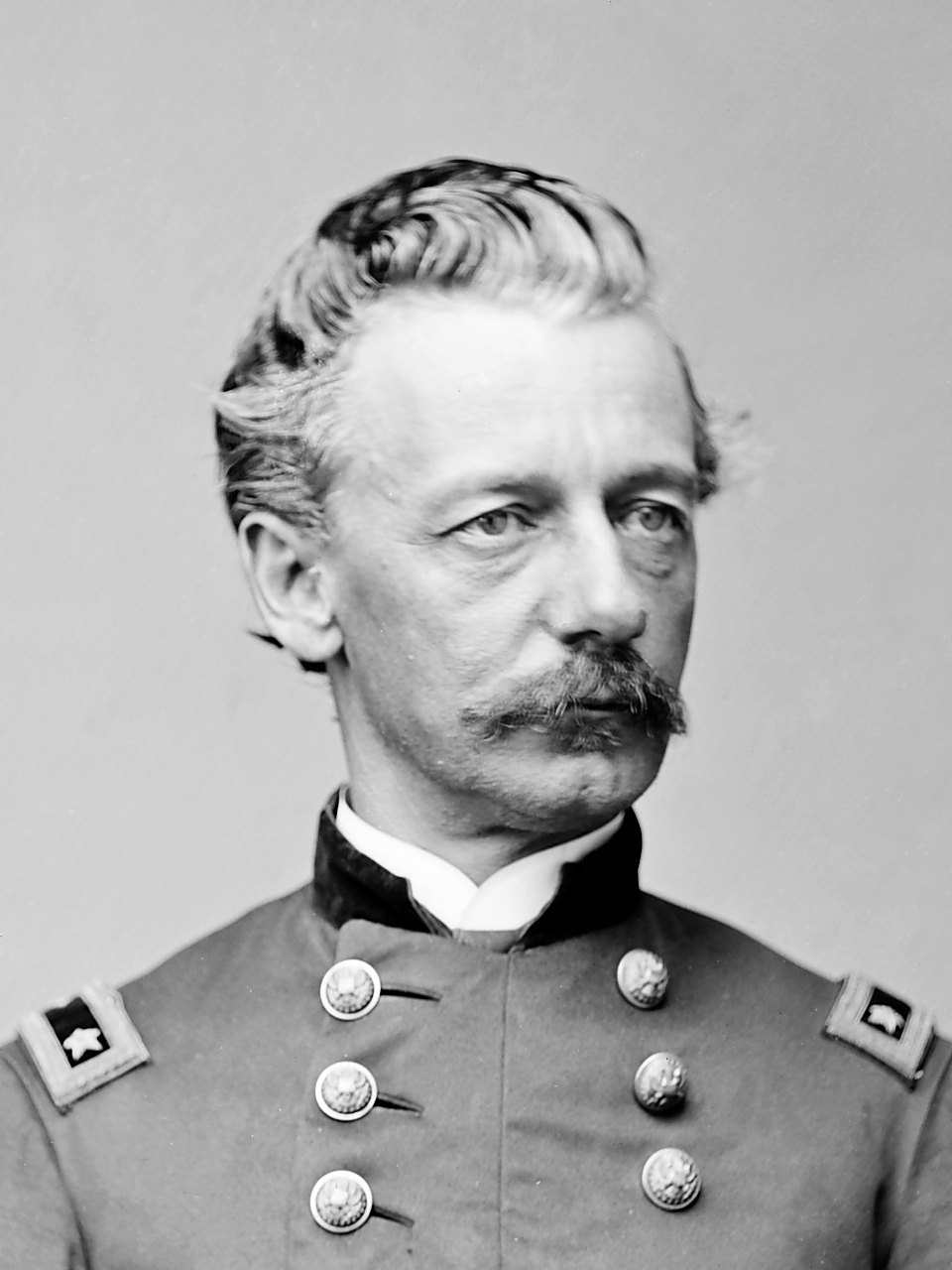
Maj. Gen.
Henry W. Slocum,
XII Corps

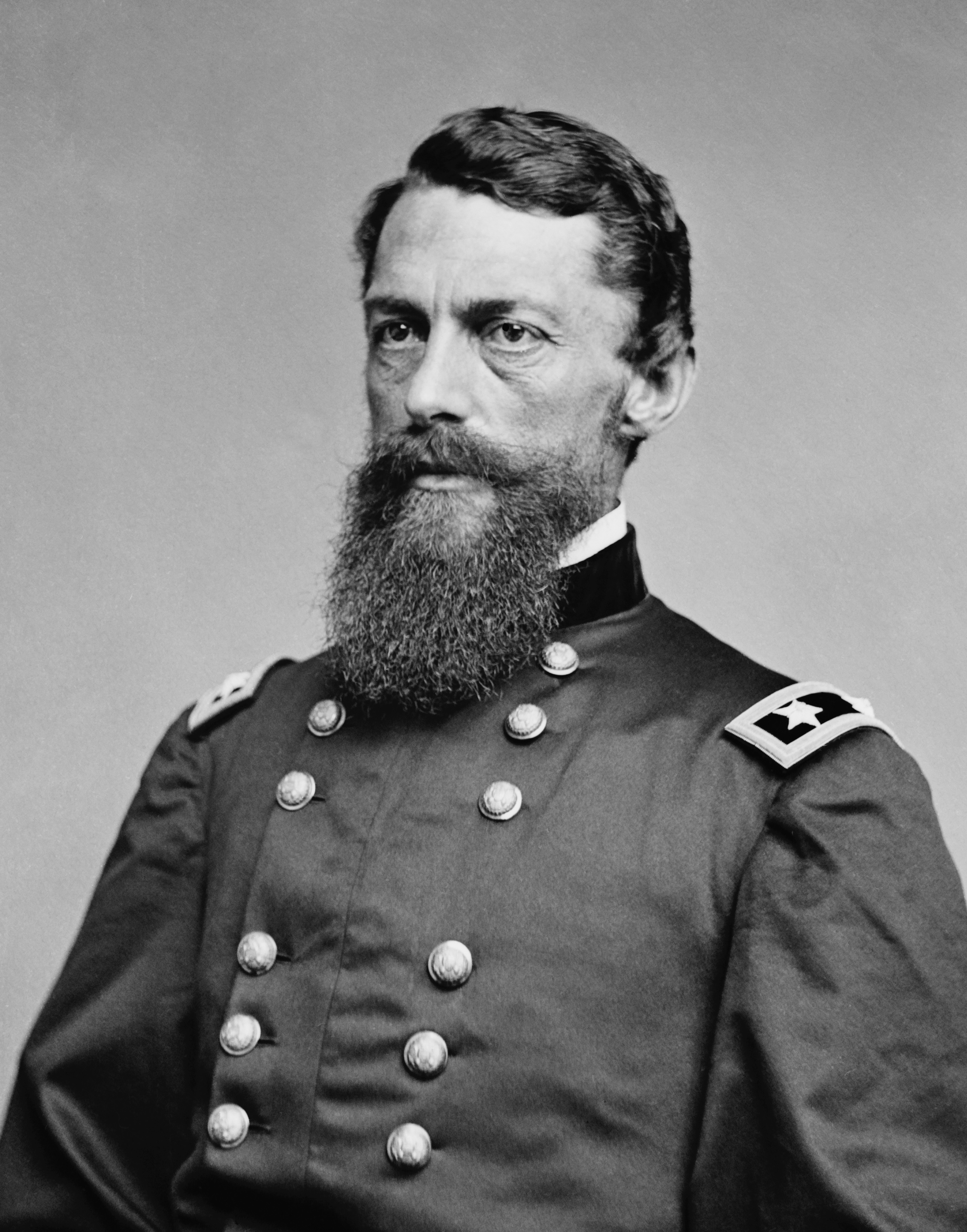
Maj. Gen.
George Stoneman,
Cav. Corps

The Army of the Potomac, commanded by Maj. Gen. Joseph Hooker, had 133,868 men and 413 guns organized as follows:

- I Corps, commanded by Maj. Gen. John F. Reynolds, with the divisions of Brig. Gens. James S. Wadsworth, John C. Robinson, and Maj. Gen. Abner Doubleday.
- II Corps, commanded by Maj. Gen. Darius N. Couch, with the divisions of Maj. Gens. Winfield Scott Hancock, William H. French, and Brig. Gen. John Gibbon.
- III Corps, commanded by Maj. Gen. Daniel E. Sickles, with the divisions of Brig. Gen. David B. Birney, and Maj. Gens. Hiram G. Berry and Amiel W. Whipple.
- V Corps, commanded by Maj. Gen. George G. Meade, with the divisions of Brig. Gens. Charles Griffin, Andrew A. Humphreys, and Maj. Gen. George Sykes.
- VI Corps, commanded by Maj. Gen. John Sedgwick, with the divisions of Brig. Gens. William T. H. Brooks, Albion P. Howe, Maj. Gen. John Newton, and Col. Hiram Burnham.
- XI Corps, commanded by Maj. Gen. Oliver O. Howard, with the divisions of Brig. Gens. Charles Devens, Jr., Adolph von Steinwehr, and Maj. Gen. Carl Schurz.
- XII Corps, commanded by Maj. Gen. Henry W. Slocum, with the divisions of Brig. Gens. Alpheus S. Williams and John W. Geary.
- Cavalry Corps, commanded by Maj. Gen. George Stoneman, with the divisions of Brig. Gens. Alfred Pleasonton, William W. Averell, and David M. Gregg.

=== Confederate ===
Key commanders (Army of Northern Virginia)
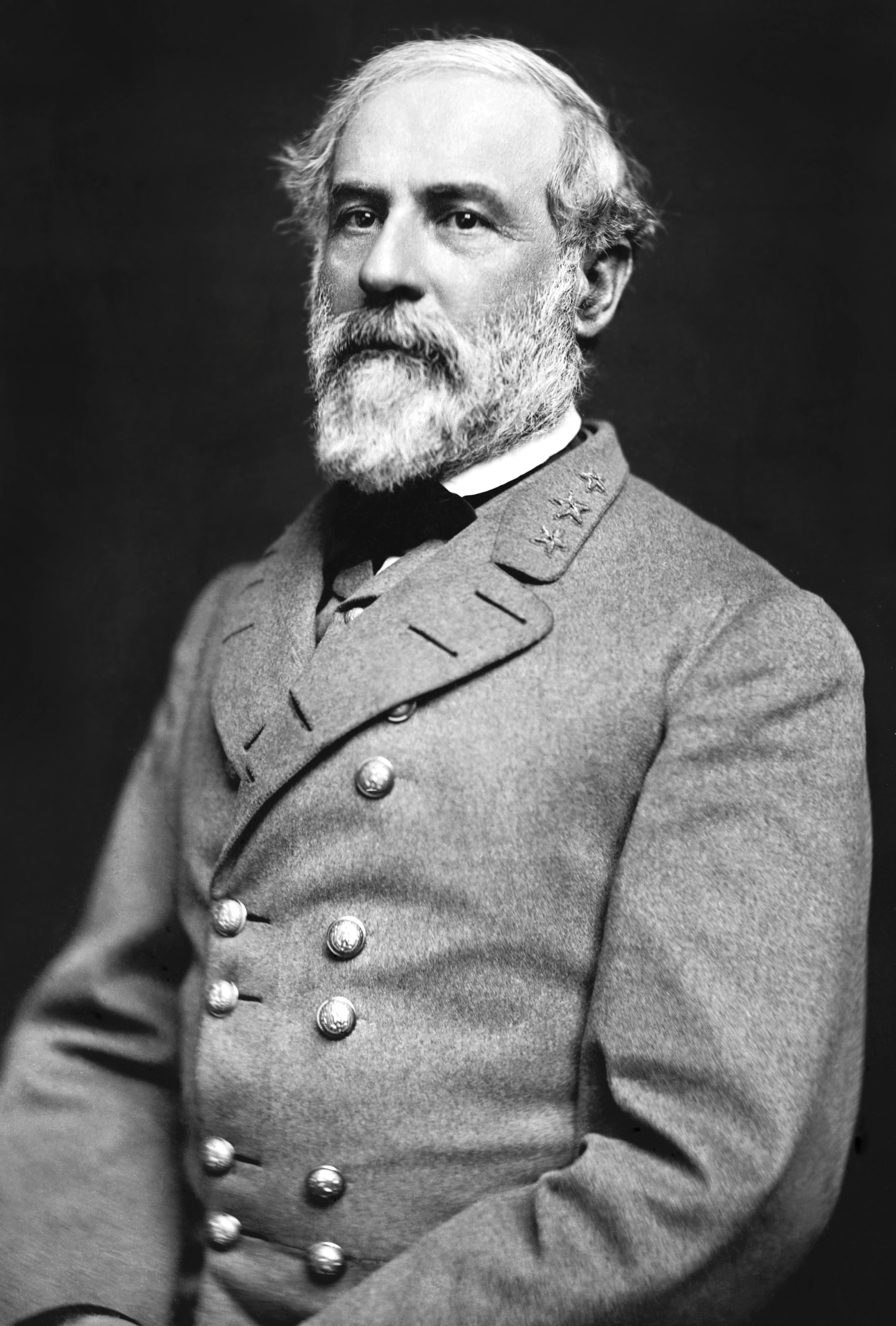
Gen.
Robert E. Lee,
(Commanding)

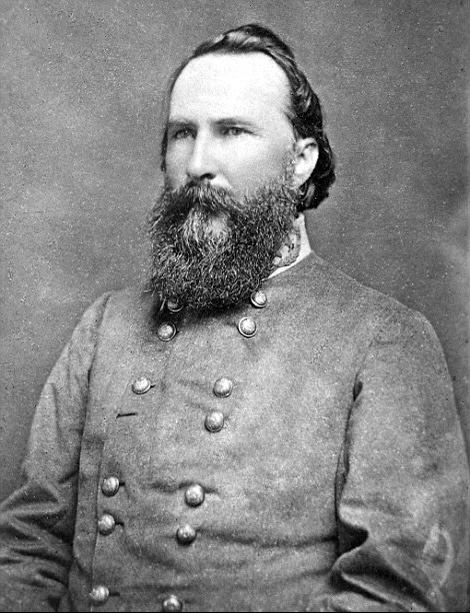
Lt. Gen.
James Longstreet,
I Corps

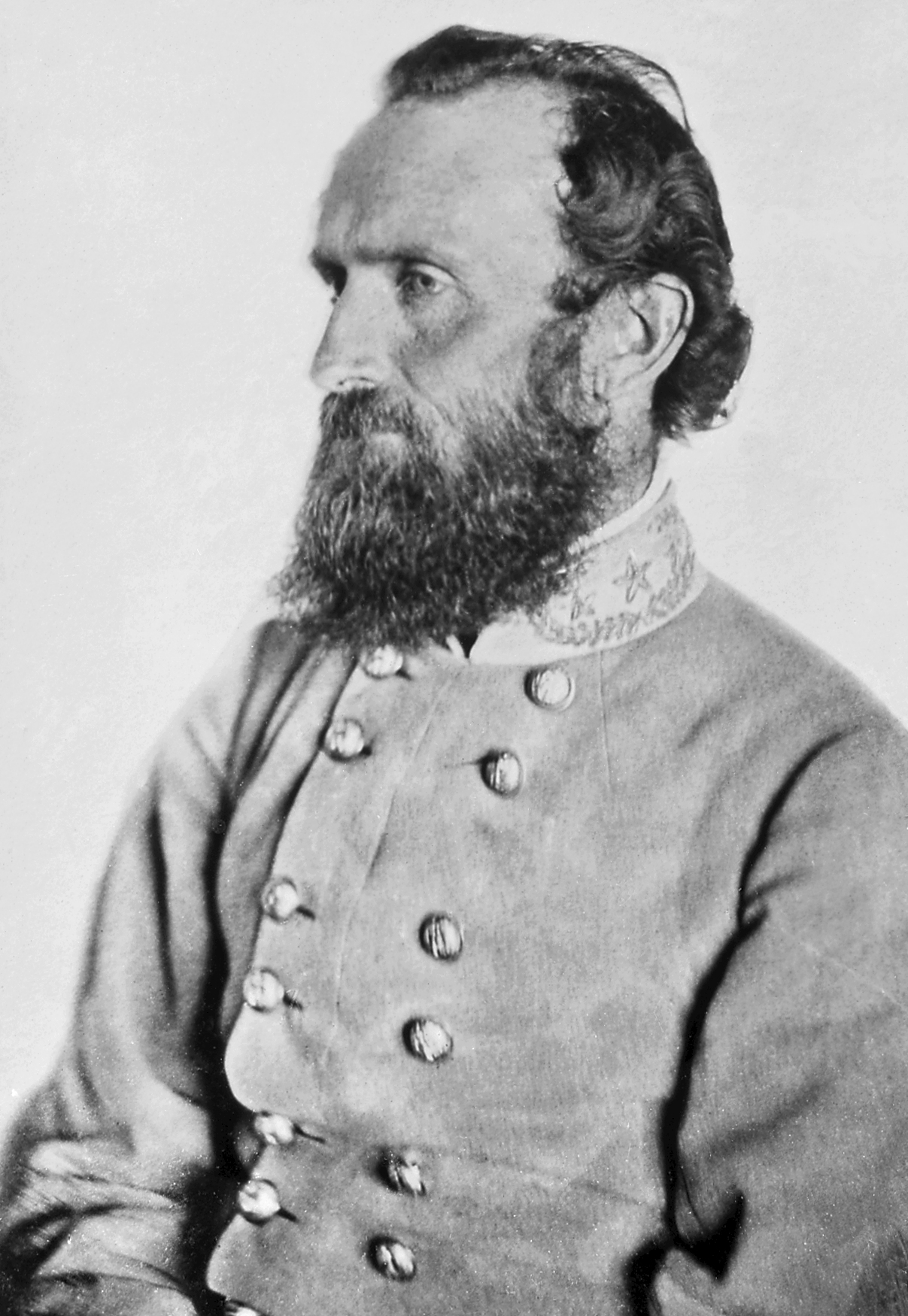
Lt. Gen.
Stonewall Jackson,
II Corps

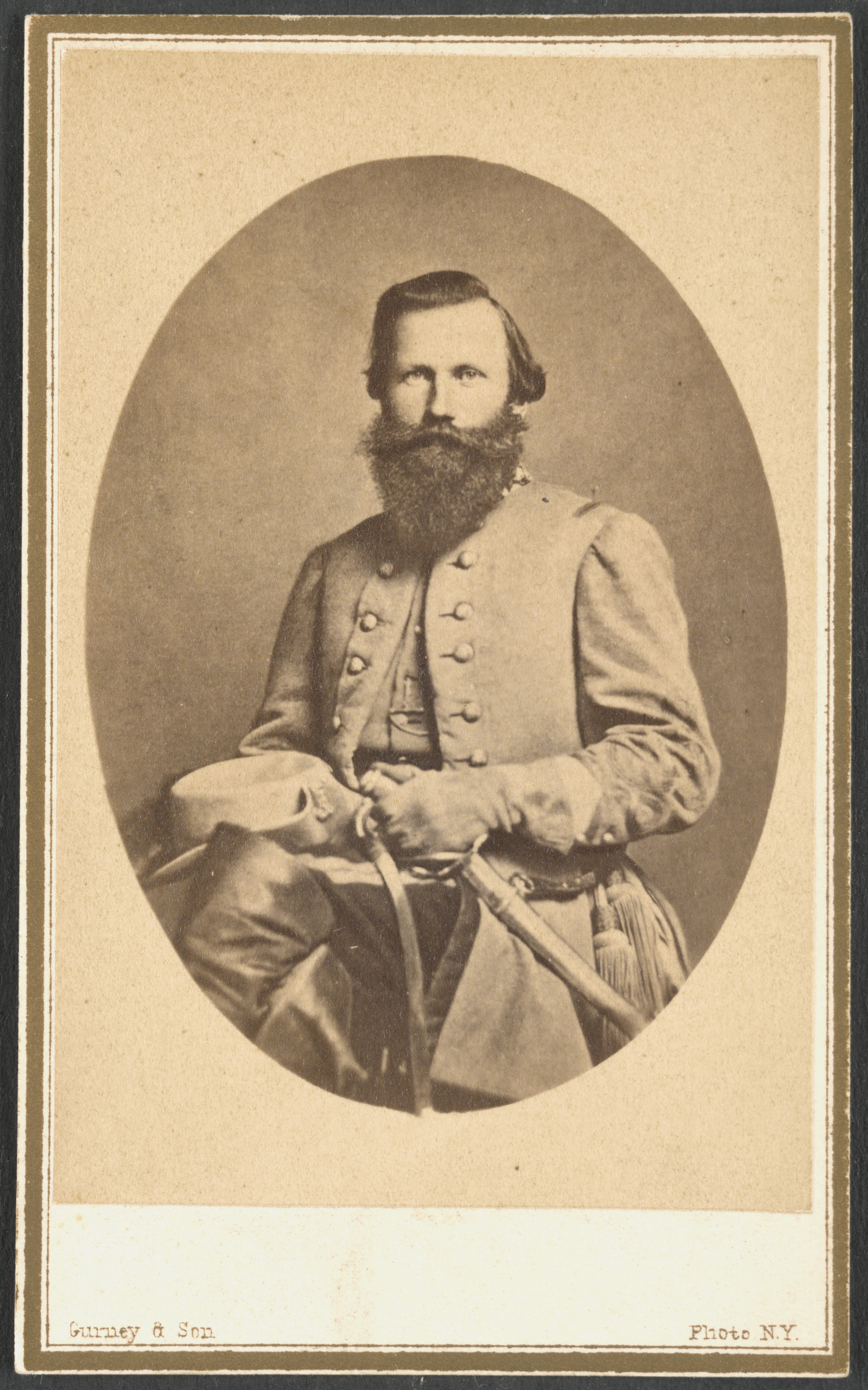
Maj. Gen.
J.E.B. Stuart,
Cav. Corps

Gen. Robert E. Lee's Army of Northern Virginia fielded 60,298 men and 220 guns, organized as follows:

- First Corps, commanded by Lt. Gen. James Longstreet. Longstreet and the majority of his corps (the divisions of Maj. Gen. John Bell Hood and Maj. Gen. George E. Pickett, and two artillery battalions) were detached for duty in southeastern Virginia. The divisions present at Chancellorsville were those of Maj. Gens. Lafayette McLaws and Richard H. Anderson.
- Second Corps, commanded by Lt. Gen. Stonewall Jackson, with the divisions of Maj. Gen. A.P. Hill, Brig. Gen. Robert E. Rodes, Maj. Gen. Jubal A. Early, and Brig. Gen. Raleigh E. Colston.
- Cavalry Corps, commanded by Maj. Gen. J.E.B. Stuart. (Stuart's corps had only two brigades at Chancellorsville, those of Brig. Gens. Fitzhugh Lee and W.H.F. "Rooney" Lee. The brigades of Brig. Gens. Wade Hampton and William E. "Grumble" Jones were detached.)

The Chancellorsville campaign was one of the most lopsided clashes of the war, with the Union's effective fighting force more than twice the Confederates', the greatest imbalance during the war in Virginia. Hooker's army was much better supplied and was well-rested after several months of inactivity. Lee's forces, on the other hand, were poorly provisioned and were scattered all over the state of Virginia. Some 15,000 men of Longstreet's Corps had previously been detached and stationed near Norfolk in order to block a potential threat to Richmond from Federal troops stationed at Fort Monroe and Newport News on the Peninsula, as well as at Norfolk and Suffolk.

In light of the continued Federal inactivity, by late March Longstreet's primary assignment became that of requisitioning provisions for Lee's forces from the farmers and planters of North Carolina and Virginia. As a result of this the two divisions of Maj. Gen. John Bell Hood and Maj. Gen. George Pickett were 130 miles (210 km) away from Lee's army and would take a week or more of marching to reach it in an emergency. After nearly a year of campaigning, allowing these troops to slip away from his immediate control was Lee's gravest miscalculation. Although he hoped to be able to call on them, these men would not arrive in time to aid his outnumbered forces.

== Battle ==
=== May 1: Hooker passes on opportunity ===
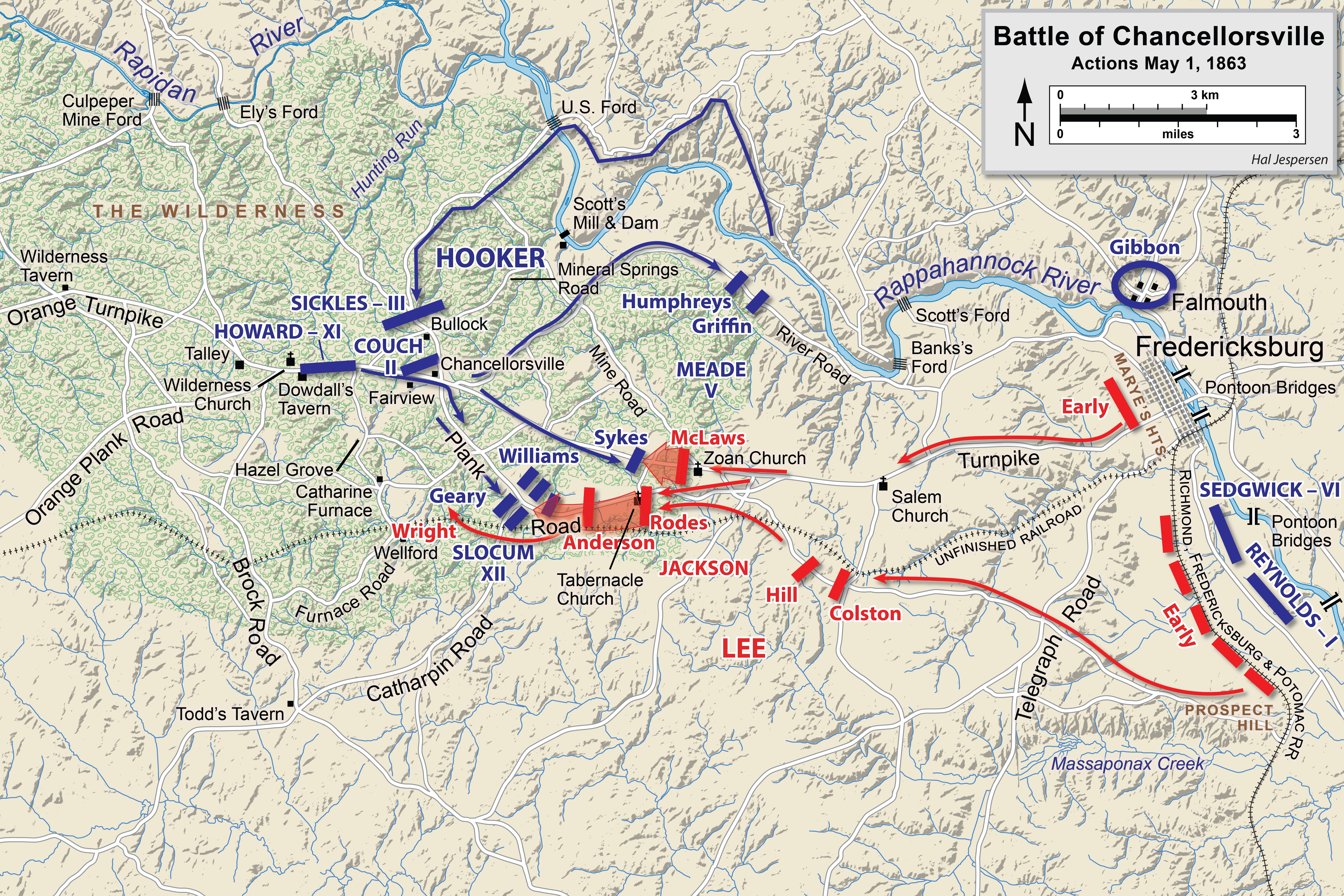
Chancellorsville, actions on May 1

Jackson's men began marching west to join with Anderson before dawn on May 1. Jackson himself met with Anderson near Zoan Church at 8 a.m., finding that McLaws's division had already arrived to join the defensive position. But Stonewall Jackson was not in a defensive mood. He ordered an advance at 11 a.m. along two roads toward Chancellorsville: McLaws's division and the brigade of Brig. Gen. William Mahone on the Turnpike, and Anderson's other brigades and Jackson's arriving units on the Plank Road.

At about the same time, Hooker ordered his men to advance on three roads to the east: two divisions of Meade's V Corps (Griffin and Humphreys) on the River Road to uncover Banks's Ford, and the remaining division (Sykes) on the Turnpike; and Slocum's XII Corps on the Plank Road, with Howard's XI Corps in close support. Couch's II Corps was placed in reserve, where it would be soon joined by Sickles's III Corps.

The first shots of the Battle of Chancellorsville were fired at 11:20 a.m. as the armies collided. McLaws's initial attack pushed back Sykes's division. The Union general organized a counterattack that recovered the lost ground. Anderson then sent a brigade under Brig. Gen. Ambrose Wright up an unfinished railroad south of the Plank Road, around the right flank of Slocum's corps. This would normally be a serious problem, but Howard's XI Corps was advancing from the rear and could deal with Wright.

Sykes's division had proceeded farther forward than Slocum on his right, leaving him in an exposed position. This forced him to conduct an orderly withdrawal at 2 p.m. to take up a position behind Hancock's division of the II Corps, which was ordered by Hooker to advance and help repulse the Confederate attack. Meade's other two divisions made good progress on the River Road and were approaching their objective, Banks's Ford.

Modern attempts to rehabilitate and fumigate Joe Hooker's reputation usually and remarkably employ special pleading about the difficulties of moving in the Wilderness. Such arguments actually emphasize the salient factor on May 1: Getting out of that wilderness of course was the very essence of the general's needs. When he abandoned the chance to reach that desirable goal, Hooker at once passed the initiative, with all of its advantages, to Lee. The Confederate would make superb use of the opportunity.

— Robert K. Krick, Lee's Greatest Victory

Despite being in a potentially favorable situation, Hooker halted his brief offensive. His actions may have demonstrated his lack of confidence in handling the complex actions of such a large organization for the first time (he had been an effective and aggressive division and corps commander in previous battles), but he had also decided before beginning the campaign that he would fight the battle defensively, forcing Lee, with his small army, to attack his own, larger one. At the [First] Battle of Fredericksburg (December 13, 1862), the Union army had done the attacking and met with a bloody defeat.

Hooker knew Lee could not sustain such a defeat and keep an effective army in the field, so he ordered his men to withdraw back into the Wilderness and take a defensive position around Chancellorsville, daring Lee to attack him or retreat with superior forces at his back. He confused matters by issuing a second order to his subordinates to hold their positions until 5 p.m., but by the time it was received, most of the Union units had begun their rearward movements. That evening, Hooker sent a message to his corps commanders, "The major general commanding trusts that a suspension in the attack to-day will embolden the enemy to attack him."

The retrograde movement had prepared me for something of the kind, but to hear from [Hooker's] own lips that the advantages gained by the successful marches of his lieutenants were to culminate in fighting a defensive battle in that nest of thickets was too much, and I retired from his presence with the belief that my commanding general was a whipped man.

— Union Maj. Gen. Darius N. Couch

Hooker's subordinates were surprised and outraged by the change in plans. They saw that the position they were fighting for near the Zoan Church was relatively high ground and offered an opportunity for the infantry and artillery to deploy outside the constraints of the Wilderness. Meade exclaimed, "My God, if we can't hold the top of the hill, we certainly can't hold the bottom of it!" Viewing through the lens of hindsight, some of the participants and many modern historians judged that Hooker effectively lost the campaign on May 1. Stephen W. Sears observed, however, that Hooker's concern was based on more than personal timidity.

The ground being disputed was little more than a clearing in the Wilderness, to which access was available by only two narrow roads. The Confederate response had swiftly concentrated the aggressive Stonewall Jackson's corps against his advancing columns such that the Federal army was outnumbered in that area, about 48,000 to 30,000, and would have difficulty maneuvering into effective lines of battle. Meade's two divisions on the River Road were too far separated to support Slocum and Sykes, and reinforcements from the rest of the II Corps and the III Corps would be too slow in arriving.

As the Union troops dug in around Chancellorsville that night, creating log breastworks, faced with abatis, Lee and Stonewall Jackson met at the intersection of the Plank Road and the Furnace Road to plan their next move. Jackson believed that Hooker would retreat across the Rappahannock, but Lee assumed that the Union general had invested too much in the campaign to withdraw so precipitously. If the Federal troops were still in position on May 2, Lee would attack them. As they discussed their options, cavalry commander J.E.B. Stuart arrived with an intelligence report from his subordinate, Brig. Gen. Fitzhugh Lee.

Although Hooker's left flank was firmly anchored by Meade's V Corps on the Rappahannock, and his center was strongly fortified, his right flank was "in the air." Howard's XI Corps was camped on the Orange Turnpike, extending past Wilderness Church, and was vulnerable to a flanking attack. Investigations of a route to be used to reach the flank identified the proprietor of Catharine Furnace, Charles C. Wellford, who showed Jackson's cartographer, Jedediah Hotchkiss, a recently constructed road through the forest that would shield marchers from the observation of Union pickets. Lee directed Jackson to make the flanking march, a maneuver similar to the one that had been so successful prior to the Second Battle of Bull Run (Second Manassas). An account by Hotchkiss recalls that Lee asked Jackson how many men he would take on the flanking march and Jackson replied, "my whole command."

=== May 2: Jackson's flank attack ===
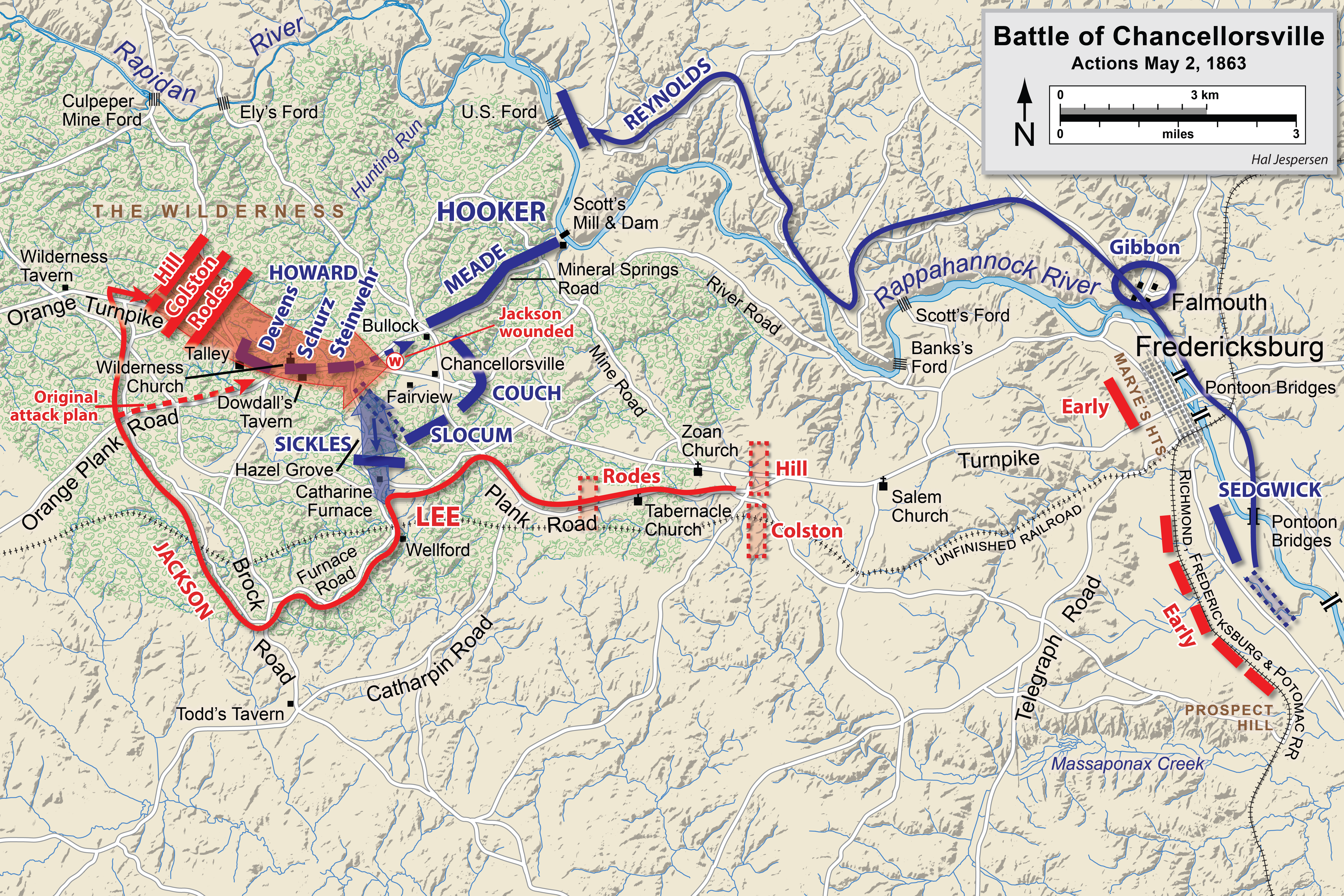
Chancellorsville, actions on May 2

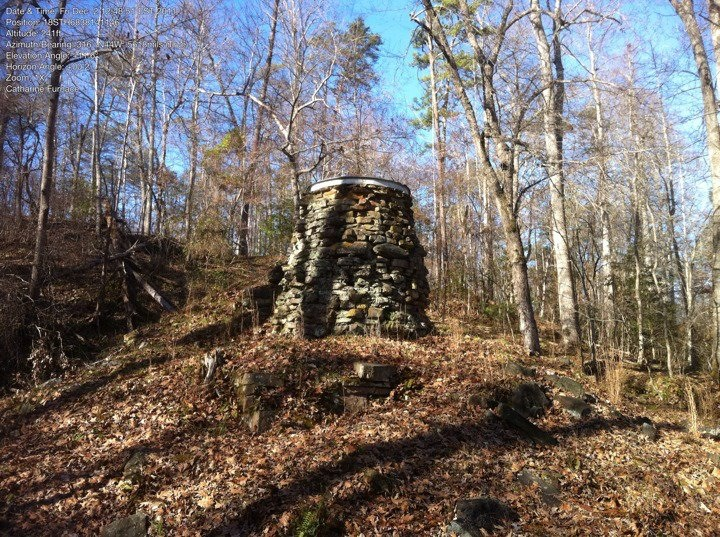
The ruins of Catharine Furnace photographed in 2011

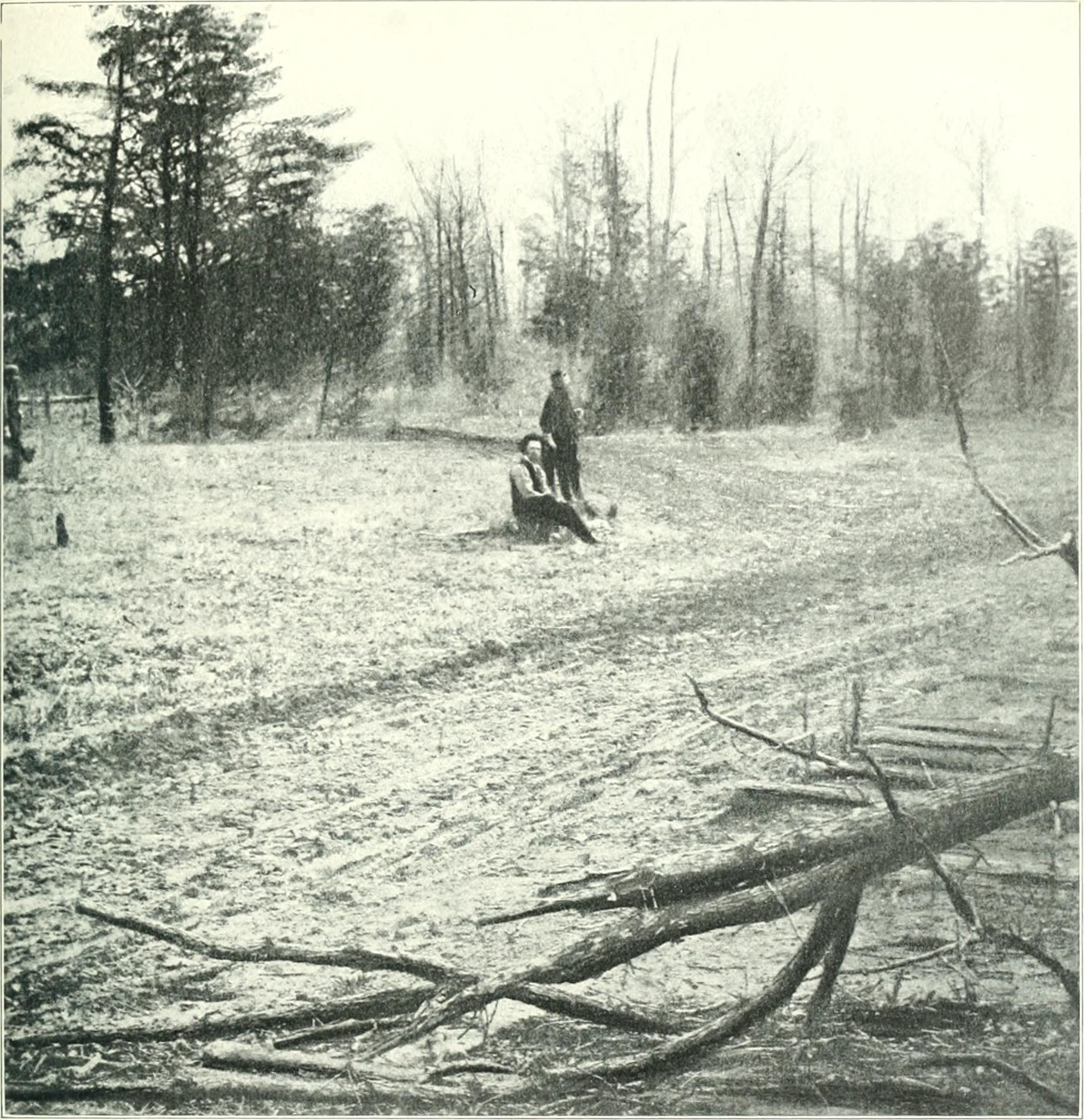
The site of "Keenan's Charge" [8th Pennsylvania Cavalry Regiment] 2 May 1863

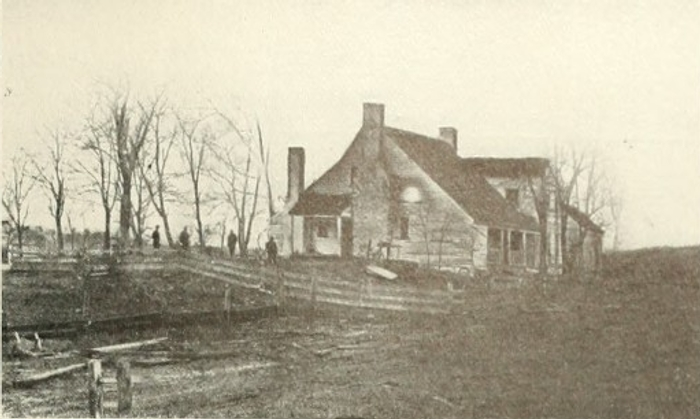
Dowdall's Tavern was Union General Oliver O. Howard's headquarters until he was surprised and driven out by Stonewall Jackson's Confederate troops on May 2.

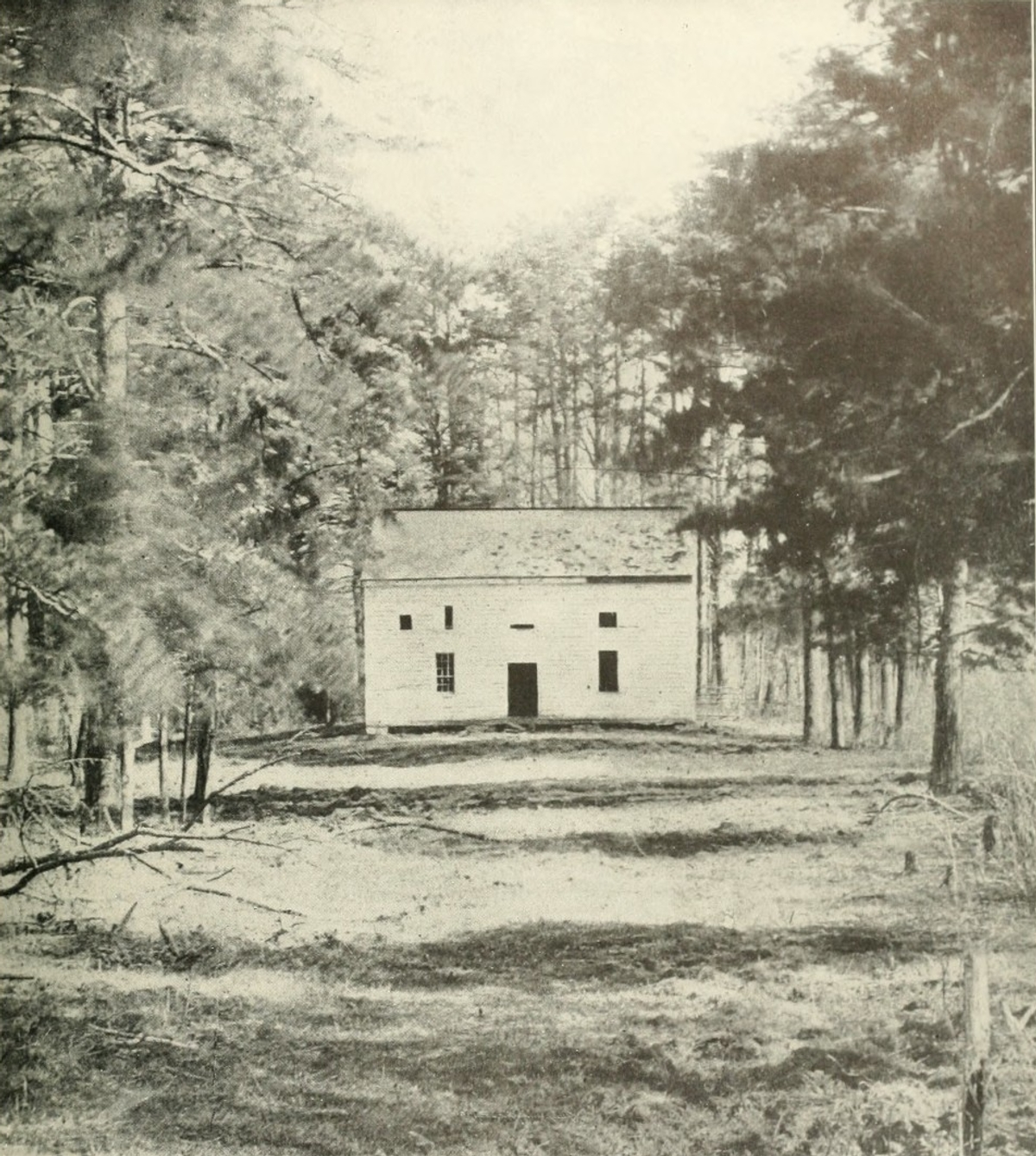
Wilderness Church at Chancellorsville was the center of a stand made by Union general Schurz's division during Stonewall Jackson's surprise flank attack.

Early on the morning of May 2, Hooker began to realize that Lee's actions on May 1 had not been constrained by the threat of Sedgwick's force at Fredericksburg, so no further deception was needed on that front. He decided to summon the I Corps of Maj. Gen. John F. Reynolds to reinforce his lines at Chancellorsville. His intent was that Reynolds would form up to the right of the XI Corps and anchor the Union right flank on the Rapidan River.

Given the communications chaos of May 1, Hooker was under the mistaken impression that Sedgwick had withdrawn back across the Rappahannock and, based on this, that the VI Corps should remain on the north bank of the river across from the town, where it could protect the army's supplies and supply line. In fact, both Reynolds and Sedgwick were still west of the Rappahannock, south of the town.

Hooker sent his orders at 1:55 a.m., expecting that Reynolds would be able to start marching before daylight, but problems with his telegraph communications delayed the order to Fredericksburg until just before sunrise. Reynolds was forced to make a risky daylight march. By the afternoon of May 2, when Hooker expected him to be digging in on the Union right at Chancellorsville, Reynolds was still marching to the Rappahannock.

Meanwhile, for the second time, Lee was dividing his army. Jackson would lead his Second Corps of 28,000 men around to attack the Union right flank while Lee exercised personal command of the remaining two divisions, about 13,000 men and 24 guns facing the 70,000 Union troops at Chancellorsville. For the plan to work, several things had to happen. First, Jackson had to make a 12-mile (19 km) march via roundabout roads to reach the Union right, and he had to do it undetected. Second, Hooker had to stay tamely on the defensive. Third, Early would have to keep Sedgwick bottled up at Fredericksburg, despite the four-to-one Union advantage there. And when Jackson launched his attack, he had to hope that the Union forces were unprepared.

Confederate cavalry under Stuart kept most Union forces from spotting Jackson on his long flank march, which started between 7 and 8 a.m. and lasted until midafternoon. Several Confederate soldiers saw the Union observation balloon Eagle soaring overhead and assumed that they could likewise be seen, but no such report was sent to headquarters. When men of the III Corps spotted a Confederate column moving through the woods, their division commander, Brig. Gen. David B. Birney, ordered his artillery to open fire, but this proved little more than harassment. The corps commander, Sickles, rode to Hazel Grove to see for himself and he reported after the battle that his men observed the Confederates passing for over three hours.

When Hooker received the report about the Confederate movement, he thought that Lee might be starting a retreat, but he also realized that a flanking march might be in progress. He took two actions. First, he sent a message at 9:30 a.m. to the commander of the XI Corps, Maj. Gen. Oliver O. Howard on his right flank: "We have good reason to suppose the enemy is moving to our right. Please advance your pickets for purposes of observation as far as may be safe in order to obtain timely information of their approach."

At 10:50 a.m., Howard replied that he was "taking measures to resist an attack from the west." Hooker's second action was to send orders to Sedgwick – "attack the enemy in his front" at Fredericksburg if "an opportunity presents itself with a reasonable expectation of success" – and Sickles – "advance cautiously toward the road followed by the enemy, and harass the movement as much as possible". Sedgwick did not take action from the discretionary orders. Sickles, however, was enthusiastic when he received the order at noon. He sent Birney's division, flanked by two battalions of Col. Hiram Berdan's U.S. sharpshooters, south from Hazel Grove with orders to pierce the column and gain possession of the road.

But the action came too late. Jackson had ordered the 23rd Georgia Infantry to guard the rear of the column and they resisted the advance of Birney and Berdan at Catherine Furnace. The Georgians were driven south and made a stand at the same unfinished railroad bed used by Wright's Brigade the day before. They were overwhelmed by 5 p.m. and most were captured. Two brigades from A.P. Hill's division turned back from the flanking march and prevented any further damage to Jackson's column, which by now had left the area.

Most of Jackson's men were unaware of the small action at the rear of their column. As they marched north on Brock Road, Jackson was prepared to turn right on the Orange Plank Road, from which his men would attack the Union lines at around Wilderness Church. However, it became apparent that this direction would lead to essentially a frontal assault against Howard's line. Fitzhugh Lee met Jackson and they ascended a hill with a sweeping view of the Union position. Jackson was delighted to see that Howard's men were resting, unaware of the impending Confederate threat.

Although by now it was 3 p.m., Jackson decided to march his men two miles farther and turn right on the Turnpike instead, allowing him to strike the unprotected flank directly. The attack formation consisted of two lines—the divisions of Brig. Gens. Robert E. Rodes and Raleigh E. Colston—stretching almost a mile on either side of the turnpike, separated by 200 yards, followed by a partial line with the arriving division of A.P. Hill.

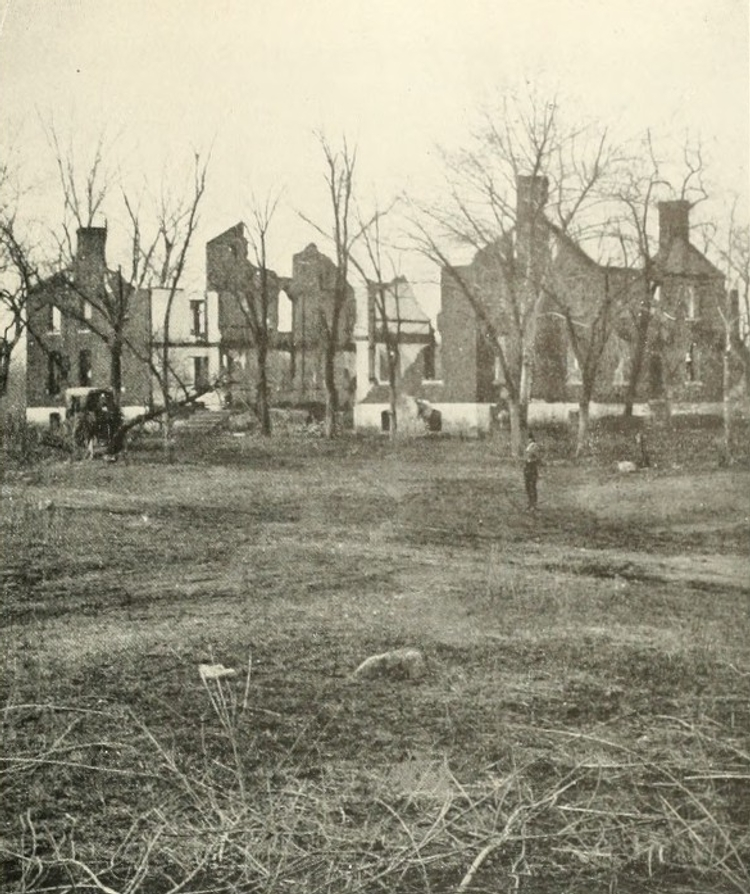
Ruins of the Chancellor House which was the headquarters of Federal General Joseph Hooker of the Army of the Potomac during the battle, later burned, May 1863

Significant contributions to the impending Union disaster were the nature of the Union XI Corps and the incompetent performance of its commander, Maj. Gen. Oliver O. Howard. Howard failed to make any provision for defending against a surprise attack, even though Hooker had ordered him to do so. The Union right flank was not anchored on any natural obstacle, and the only defenses against a flank attack consisted of two cannons pointing out into the Wilderness.

Also, the XI Corps was not well respected – an outfit with poor morale and no history of battlefield success. Many of its officers and enlisted men were immigrants from Germany and other parts of Central Europe, including a number of political refugees from the 1848 revolutions. The corps had been formed in the spring of 1862 by merging Brig. Gen Louis Blenker's division with Maj. Gen John C. Frémont's Mountain Department in West Virginia. After a miserable trek across Virginia in which Blenker's troops were provisioned inadequately and suffered from widespread hunger, disease, and desertion, they joined with Fremont in a campaign that resulted in them being soundly defeated by Stonewall Jackson.

Fremont's army became part of Maj. Gen John Pope's Army of Virginia in the summer. Fremont had refused to serve under Pope and was replaced by Maj. Gen Franz Sigel, an inept political general who, however, was much beloved by his German troops. Louis Blenker fell from a horse during the Northern Virginia campaign and suffered injuries that would claim his life later in 1863. The corps suffered heavy casualties at Second Bull Run and was left behind in Washington D.C. during the Maryland campaign. During the Fredericksburg campaign, it did not join the rest of the army until after the battle was over.

After Hooker took command, Sigel was the ranking general behind him. The XI Corps was the smallest in the army and Sigel's requests to general-in-chief Henry Halleck to have it enlarged were refused, so he resigned his command in March 1863 and was replaced by Maj. Gen Oliver O. Howard, who was widely unpopular with the enlisted men and brought in several new generals, such as Brig. Gen Francis Barlow, who had a reputation of being aggressive martinets. Eight of the 27 regiments in the corps had never been in battle before, while the remaining 21 had never been on the winning side of a battle. The German soldiers suffered from widespread ethnic friction with the rest of the army although a number of the regiments in the XI Corps consisted of native-born Americans.

Hooker had no major plans for the corps except for mopping up after the main battle was over, and it was placed out on the army's right flank where it was not expected to be involved in any fighting, and the woods to the west were assumed to be so thick that enemy troops could not possibly move through them and form a line of battle. As far as Hooker knew, the only possible route for a Confederate attack was along the turnpike, which would cause them to run right into the II and XII Corps, both elite outfits and well-entrenched. Further north, the Union line was held by the V Corps, also first-rate troops occupying an almost impregnable position.

As the day wore on, the men of the XI Corps became increasingly aware that something was going on in the woods to the west of them, but were unable to get any higher-ups to pay attention. Col. John C. Lee of the 55th Ohio received numerous reports of a Confederate presence out there, and Col. William Richardson of the 25th Ohio reported that huge numbers of Confederates were massing to the west. Col. Leopold von Gilsa, who commanded one of two brigades in Brig. Gen Charles Devens' division, went to Howard's headquarters warning him that an all-out enemy assault was imminent, but Howard insisted that it was impossible for the Confederates to get through the dense woods.

Maj. Gen Carl Schurz, who commanded the 3rd Division of the corps, began rearranging his troops into a line of battle. Captain Hubert Dilger, who commanded Battery I of the 1st Ohio Artillery, rode out on a reconnaissance mission, narrowly missed being captured by the Confederates, and rode far north, almost to the banks of the Rapidan, and back south to Hooker's headquarters, but a haughty cavalry officer dismissed his concerns and would not let him in to see the general. Dilger next went to Howard's headquarters, but was merely told that the Confederate army was retreating and that it was not acceptable to make scouting expeditions without permission of higher-ups. As the sun started to go down, all remained quiet on the XI Corps's front, the noises of the III and XII Corps engaging Lee's rear guard coming from off in the distance.

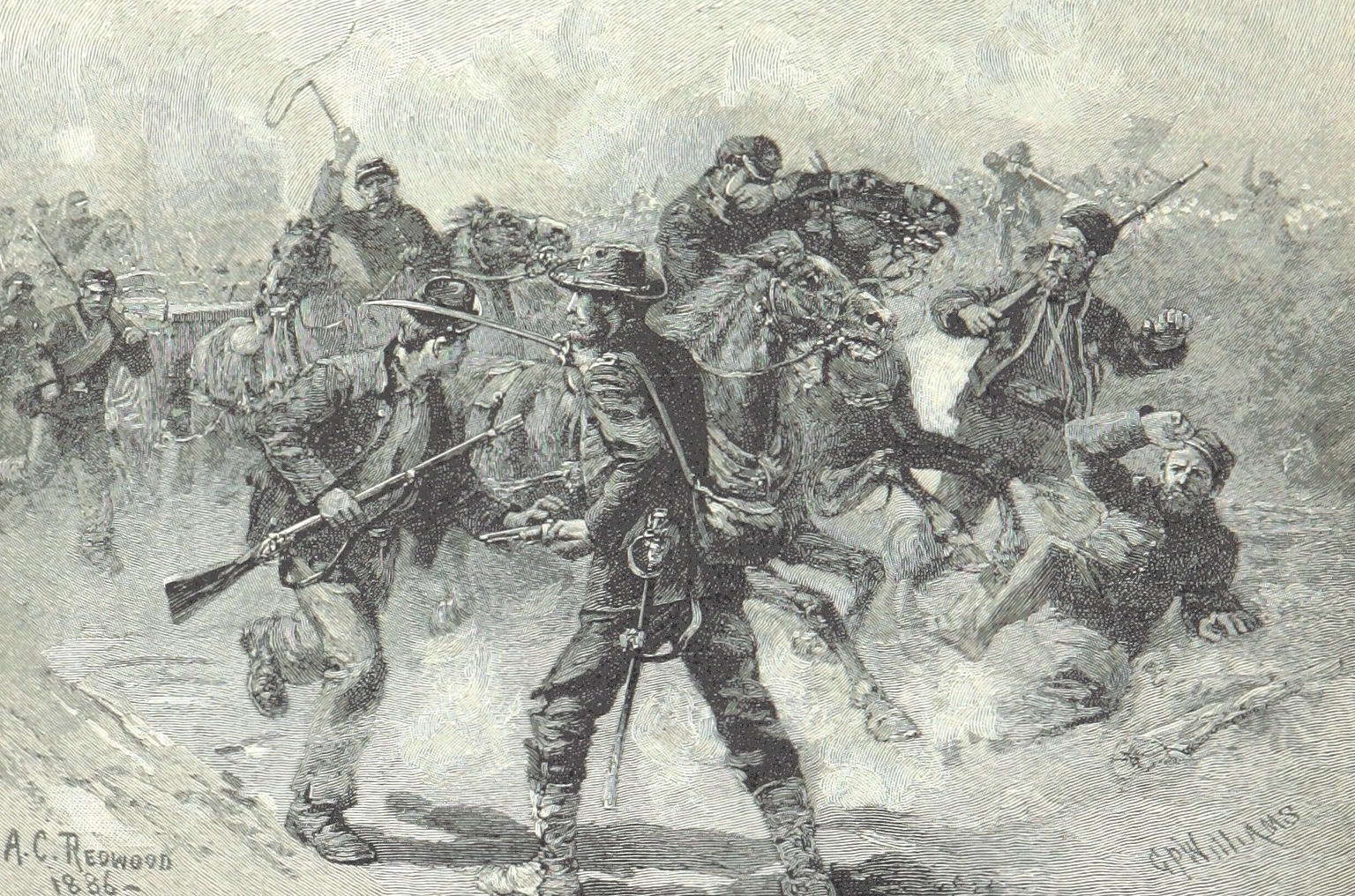
The XI Corps routs before Jackson's evening dinner time surprise attack

Around 5:30 p.m., Jackson turned to Robert Rodes and asked him "General, are you ready?" When Rodes nodded, Jackson replied, "You may go forward then." Most of the men of the XI Corps were encamped and sitting down for supper and had their rifles unloaded and stacked. Their first clue to the impending onslaught was the observation of numerous animals, such as rabbits and foxes, fleeing in their direction out of the western woods. This was followed by the crackle of musket fire, and then the unmistakable scream of the "rebel yell".

Two of von Gilsa's regiments, the 153rd Pennsylvania and 54th New York, had been placed up as a heavy skirmish line and the massive Confederate assault rolled completely over them. A few men managed to get off a shot or two before fleeing. The pair of artillery pieces at the very end of the XI Corps line were captured by the Confederates and promptly turned on their former owners. Devens's division collapsed in a matter of minutes, slammed on three sides by almost 30,000 Confederates. Col. Robert Reily and his 75th Ohio managed to resist for about ten minutes before the regiment disintegrated with 150 casualties, including Reily himself, and joined the rest of the fleeing mob.

Col. Lee would later write sarcastically, "A rifle pit is useless when the enemy is on the same side and in rear of your line." Some men tried to stand and resist, but they were knocked over by their fleeing comrades and a hail of Confederate bullets. Maj. Gen. Carl Schurz ordered his division to shift from an east–west alignment to north–south, which they did with amazing precision and speed. They resisted for about 20 minutes and "Leatherbreeches" Dilger managed to drive the Confederates off the turnpike for a bit with his guns, but the sheer weight of Jackson's assault overwhelmed them, too, and they soon had to flee.

Dilger for a time stood alone with a gun firing double-shotted canister at the attackers, then limbered up to flee as the Confederates closed in on him. Three of his artillery horses were shot dead, and when he realized that the gun could not be moved, he had to abandon it. General Howard partially redeemed his inadequate performance prior to the battle by his personal bravery in attempting to rally the troops. He stood shouting and waving a flag held under the stump of his amputated arm lost at the Battle of Seven Pines in 1862, ignoring the danger of the heavy rifle fire, but he could only gather small pockets of soldiers to resist before his corps disintegrated. Col. Adolf Buschbeck's brigade put up a last-ditch stand along with Dilger's guns. They too had to retreat, but maintained good order as they went.

The chaos unfurling on the Union right had gone unnoticed at Hooker's headquarters until at last the sound of gunfire could be heard in the distance, followed by a panic-stricken mob of men and horses pouring into the Chancellorsville clearing. A staff officer yelled "My God, here they come!" as the mob ran to and past the Chancellor mansion. Hooker jumped onto his horse and frantically tried to take action. He ordered Maj. Gen Hiram Berry's division of the III Corps, once his own division, forward, yelling "Receive them on your bayonets!" Artillerymen around the clearing began moving guns into position around Fairview Cemetery.

Meanwhile, down at Hazel Grove, the 8th Pennsylvania Cavalry were relaxing and awaiting orders to chase after Confederate wagon trains, also oblivious to the collapse of the XI Corps. The regiment's commander, Maj. Pennock Huey, received a notice that General Howard was requesting some cavalry. Huey saddled up his men and headed west along the turnpike, where they ran straight into Robert Rodes's division. After a confused fight, the 8th Pennsylvania Cavalry retreated to the safety of the Chancellorsville clearing with the loss of 30 men and three officers.

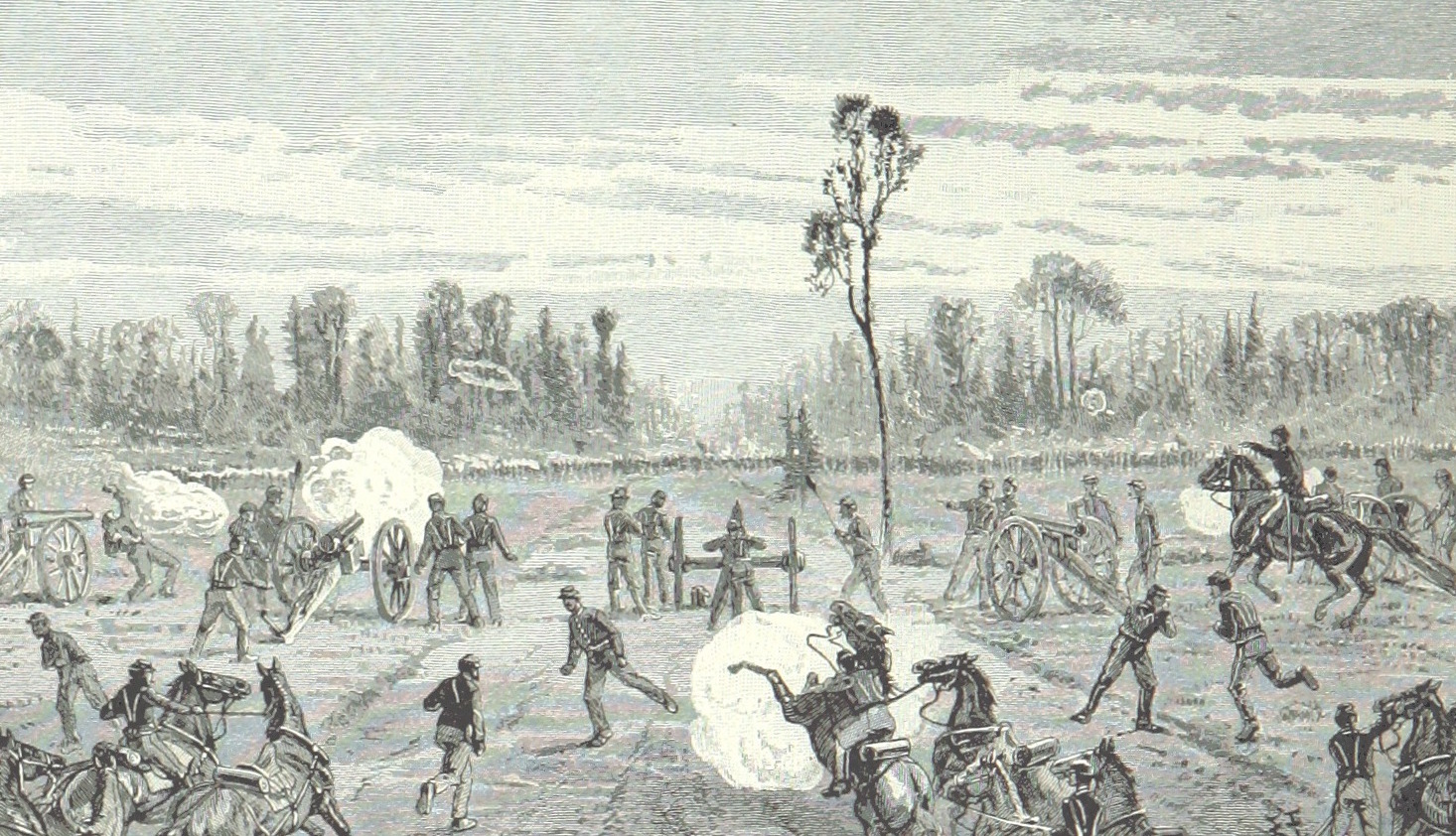
XII Corps artillery halting Jackson's surprise attack

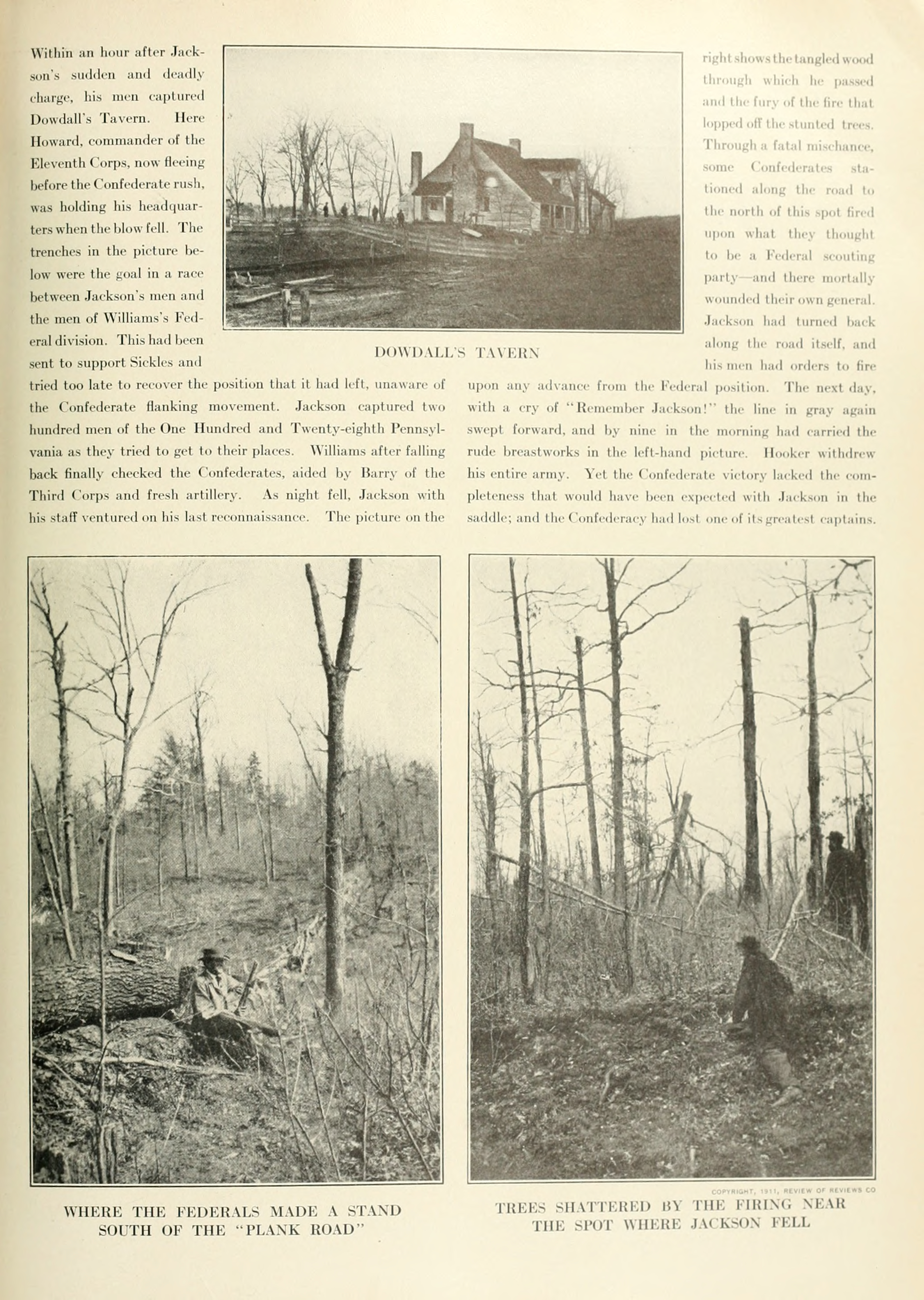
Lower right photograph of trees shattered by artillery shells near where Jackson was shot on the Orange Plank Road.

By nightfall, the Confederate Second Corps had advanced more than 1.25 miles, to within sight of Chancellorsville, but darkness and confusion were taking their toll. The attackers were almost as disorganized as the routed defenders. Although the XI Corps had been defeated, it had retained some coherence as a unit. The corps suffered nearly 2,500 casualties (259 killed, 1,173 wounded, and 994 missing or captured), about one quarter of its strength, including 12 of 23 regimental commanders, which suggests that they fought fiercely during their retreat.

Jackson's force was now separated from Lee's men only by Sickles's corps, which had been separated from the main body of the army after its foray attacking Jackson's column earlier in the afternoon. Like everyone else in the Union army, the III Corps had been unaware of Jackson's attack. When he first heard the news, Sickles was skeptical, but finally believed it and decided to pull back to Hazel Grove.

Sickles became increasingly nervous, knowing that his troops were facing an unknown number of Confederates to the west. A patrol of Jackson's troops was driven back by Union gunners, a minor incident that would come to be exaggerated into a heroic repulse of Jackson's entire command. Between 11 p.m. and midnight, Sickles organized an assault north from Hazel Grove toward the Plank Road, but called it off when his men began suffering artillery and rifle friendly fire from the Union XII Corps.

Stonewall Jackson wanted to press his advantage before Hooker and his army could regain their bearings and plan a counterattack, which might still succeed because of the sheer disparity in numbers. He rode out onto the Plank Road that night to determine the feasibility of a night attack by the light of the full moon, traveling beyond the farthest advance of his men. When one of his staff officers warned him about the dangerous position, Jackson replied, "The danger is all over. The enemy is routed. Go back and tell A.P. Hill to press right on."

As he and his staff started to return, they were incorrectly identified as Union cavalry by men of the 18th North Carolina Infantry, who hit Jackson with friendly fire. Jackson's three bullet wounds were not in themselves life-threatening, but his left arm was broken and had to be amputated. While recovering, he contracted pneumonia and died on May 10. His death was a devastating loss for the Confederacy. Some historians and participants—particularly those of the postbellum Lost Cause movement—attribute the Confederate defeat at Gettysburg two months later to Jackson's absence.

The Union gunners at Fairview Cemetery were alert and nervous; they were a few hundred yards behind Berry's division and still-intact elements of the XI Corps and they found it quite impossible to fire their guns without the shells going over the heads of the infantrymen in front of them. A few friendly-fire casualties resulted from this as the gunners were quick to shoot at anything that looked like enemy soldiers; when they got sight of a large body of Confederates drawing near, they let loose a huge cannonade that landed on and around the party that was carrying the wounded Jackson to the rear and did end up wounding A.P. Hill.

=== May 3: Chancellorsville ===
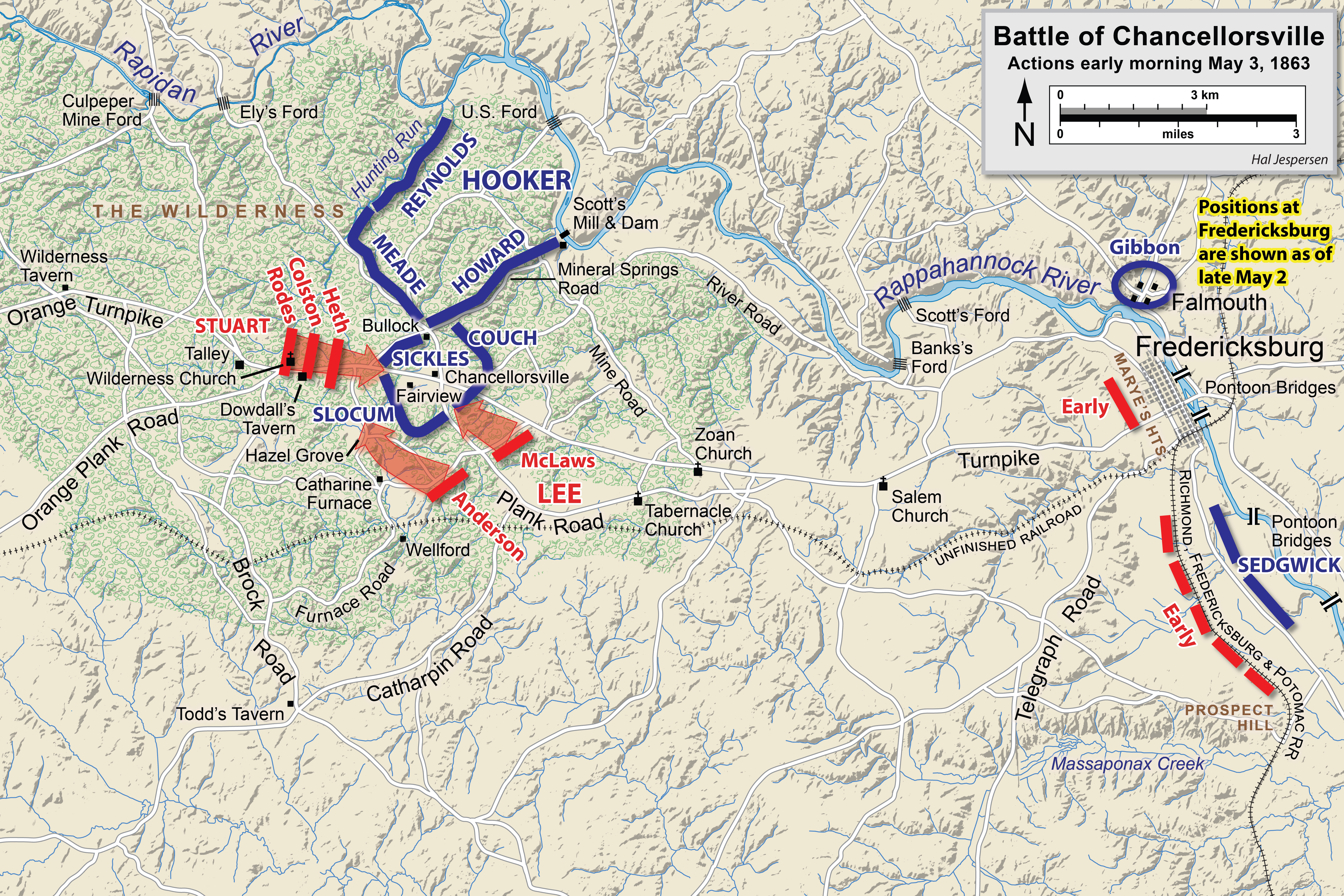
Chancellorsville, actions on May 3, dawn to 10 a.m.

Despite the fame of Stonewall Jackson's victory on May 2, it did not result in a significant military advantage for the Army of Northern Virginia. Howard's XI Corps had been defeated, but the Army of the Potomac remained a potent force and Reynolds's I Corps had arrived overnight, which replaced Howard's losses. About 76,000 Union men faced 43,000 Confederate at the Chancellorsville front. The two halves of Lee's army at Chancellorsville were separated by Sickles's III Corps, which occupied a strong position on high ground at Hazel Grove.

Unless Lee could devise a plan to eject Sickles from Hazel Grove and combine the two halves of his army, he would have little chance of success in assaulting the formidable Union earthworks around Chancellorsville. Fortunately for Lee, Joseph Hooker inadvertently cooperated. Early on May 3, Hooker ordered Sickles to move from Hazel Grove to a new position on the Plank Road. As they were withdrawing, the trailing elements of Sickles's corps were attacked by the Confederate brigade of Brig. Gen. James J. Archer, which captured about 100 prisoners and four cannons. Hazel Grove was soon turned into a powerful artillery platform with 30 guns under Col. Porter Alexander.

After Jackson was wounded on May 2, command of the Second Corps fell to his senior division commander, Maj. Gen. A.P. Hill. Hill was soon wounded himself. He consulted with Brig. Gen. Robert E. Rodes, the next most senior general in the corps, and Rodes acquiesced in Hill's decision to summon Maj. Gen. J.E.B. Stuart to take command, notifying Lee after the fact. Brig. Gen. Henry Heth replaced Hill in division command.

Although Stuart was a cavalryman who had never commanded infantry before, he was to deliver a creditable performance at Chancellorsville. By the morning of May 3, the Union line resembled a horseshoe. The center was held by the III, XII, and II Corps. On the left were the remnants of the XI Corps, and the right was held by the V and I Corps. On the western side of the Chancellorsville salient, Stuart organized his three divisions to straddle the Plank Road: Heth's in the advance, Colston's 300–500 yards behind, and Rodes's, whose men had done the hardest fighting on May 2, near the Wilderness Church.

The attack began about 5:30 a.m. supported by the newly installed artillery at Hazel Grove, and by simultaneous attacks by the divisions of Anderson and McLaws from the south and southeast. The Confederates were resisted fiercely by the Union troops behind strong earthworks, and the fighting on May 3 was the heaviest of the campaign. The initial waves of assaults by Heth and Colston gained a little ground, but were beaten back by Union counterattacks.

At Hazel Grove, in short, the finest artillerists of the Army of Northern Virginia were having their greatest day. They had improved guns, better ammunition and superior organization. With the fire of battle shining through his spectacles, William Pegram rejoiced. "A glorious day, Colonel," he said to Porter Alexander, "a glorious day!"

— Douglas Southall Freeman, Lee's Lieutenants

Rodes sent his men in last and this final push, along with the excellent performance of the Confederate artillery, carried the morning battle. Chancellorsville was the only occasion in the war in Virginia in which Confederate gunners held a decided advantage over their Federal counterparts. Confederate guns on Hazel Grove were joined by 20 more on the Plank Road to duel effectively with the Union guns on neighboring Fairview Hill, causing the Federals to withdraw as ammunition ran low and Confederate infantrymen picked off the gun crews.

Fairview was evacuated at 9:30 a.m., briefly recaptured in a counterattack, but by 10 a.m. Hooker ordered it abandoned for good. The loss of this artillery platform doomed the Union position at the Chancellorsville crossroads as well, and the Army of the Potomac began a fighting retreat to positions circling United States Ford. The soldiers of the two halves of Lee's army reunited shortly after 10 a.m. before the Chancellor mansion, wildly triumphant as Lee arrived on Traveller to survey the scene of his victory.

Lee's presence was the signal for one of those uncontrollable bursts of enthusiasm which none can appreciate who has not witnessed them. The fierce soldiers, with their faces blackened with the smoke of battle, the wounded crawling with feeble limbs from the fury of the devouring flames, all seemed possessed with a common impulse. One long unbroken cheer, in which the feeble cry of those who lay helpless on the earth blended with the strong voices of those who still fought, rose high above the roar of battle and hailed the presence of a victorious chief. He sat in the full realization of all that soldiers dream of—triumph; and as I looked at him in the complete fruition of the success which his genius, courage, and confidence in his army had won, I thought that it must have been from some such scene that men in ancient days ascended to the dignity of gods.

— Charles Marshall, Lee's military secretary, An Aide-de-Camp to Lee

At the height of the fighting on May 3, Hooker suffered an injury when at 9:15 a.m. a Confederate cannonball hit a wooden pillar he was leaning against at his headquarters. He later wrote that half of the pillar "violently [struck me] ... in an erect position from my head to my feet." He likely received a concussion, which was sufficiently severe to render him unconscious for over an hour. Although clearly incapacitated after he arose, Hooker refused to turn over command temporarily to his second-in-command, Maj. Gen. Darius N. Couch, and, with Hooker's chief of staff, Maj. Gen. Daniel Butterfield, and Sedgwick out of communication (again due to the failure of the telegraph lines), there was no one at headquarters with sufficient rank or stature to convince Hooker otherwise. This failure may have affected Union performance over the next day and may have directly contributed to Hooker's seeming lack of nerve and timid performance throughout the rest of the battle.

Meanwhile, at about 7:30 a.m., near Chancellorsville, III Corps, Second Division commander Maj. Gen. Hiram Berry was killed by Confederate musket fire. Brig. Gen. Gershom Mott, next in seniority, was also severely wounded at about that time. Believing himself to be next in command, Brig. Gen. Joseph Warren Revere (grandson of Paul Revere) assumed command of the division. Finding himself in among stragglers from the battle and unable to contact Sickles, Revere commanded a group of 500 or 600 soldiers to reform at a point about three miles to the north of Chancellorsville. This three-mile march away from the battlefield, described by Revere as a "regrouping effort" and not a retreat, led to his being court-martialed in August by Maj. Gen. Hooker. This coincided with Revere's friendly 1852 conversation with Stonewall Jackson, in which Jackson used horoscopes and astrology to predict Revere's "culmination of the malign aspect" in the first days of May 1863.

=== May 3: Fredericksburg and Salem Church ===
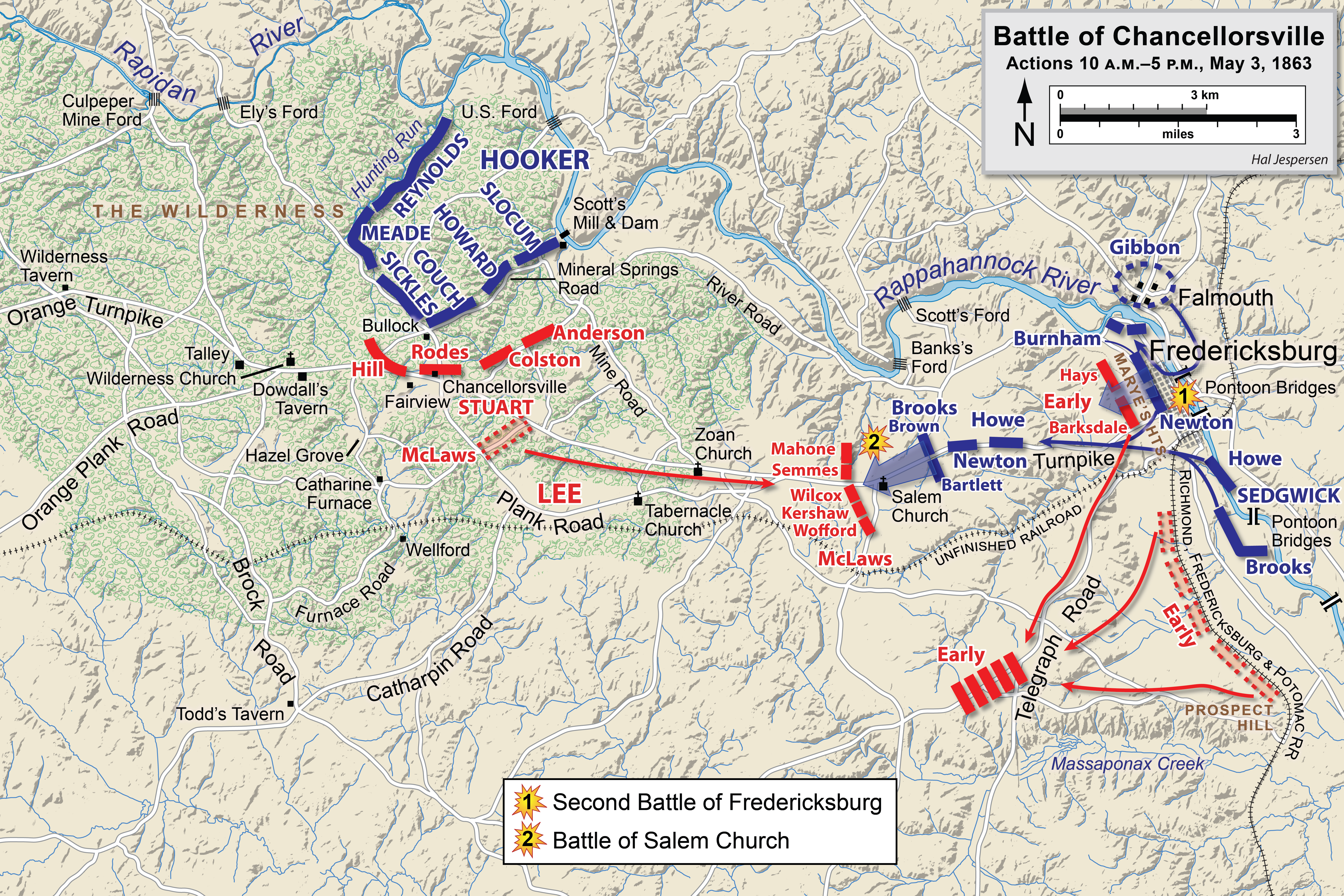
Chancellorsville, actions on May 3, 10 a.m. to 5 p.m., including the Second Battle of Fredericksburg and the Battle of Salem Church

As Lee was savoring his victory at the Chancellorsville crossroads, he received disturbing news: Maj. Gen. John Sedgwick's force had broken through the Confederate lines at Fredericksburg and was headed toward Chancellorsville. On the night of May 2, in the aftermath of Jackson's flank attack, Hooker had ordered Sedgwick to "cross the Rappahannock at Fredericksburg on the receipt of this order, and at once take up your line of march on the Chancellorsville road until you connect with him. You will attack and destroy any force you may fall in with on the road."

Lee had left a relatively small force at Fredericksburg, ordering Maj. Gen. Jubal Early to "watch the enemy and try to hold him." If he was attacked in "overwhelming numbers," Early was to retreat to Richmond, but if Sedgwick withdrew from his front, he was to join with Lee at Chancellorsville. On the morning of May 2, Early received a garbled message from Lee's staff that caused him to start marching most of his men toward Chancellorsville, but he quickly returned after a warning from Brig. Gen. William Barksdale of a Union advance against Fredericksburg.

At 7 a.m. on May 3, Early was confronted with four Union divisions: Brig. Gen. John Gibbon of the II Corps had crossed the Rappahannock north of town, and three divisions of Sedgwick's VI Corps—Maj. Gen. John Newton and Brig. Gens. Albion P. Howe and William T. H. Brooks—were arrayed in line from the front of the town to Deep Run. Most of Early's combat strength was deployed to the south of town, where Federal troops had achieved their most significant successes during the December battle. Marye's Heights was defended by Barksdale's Mississippi brigade and Early ordered the Louisiana brigade of Brig. Gen. Harry T. Hays from the far right to Barksdale's left.

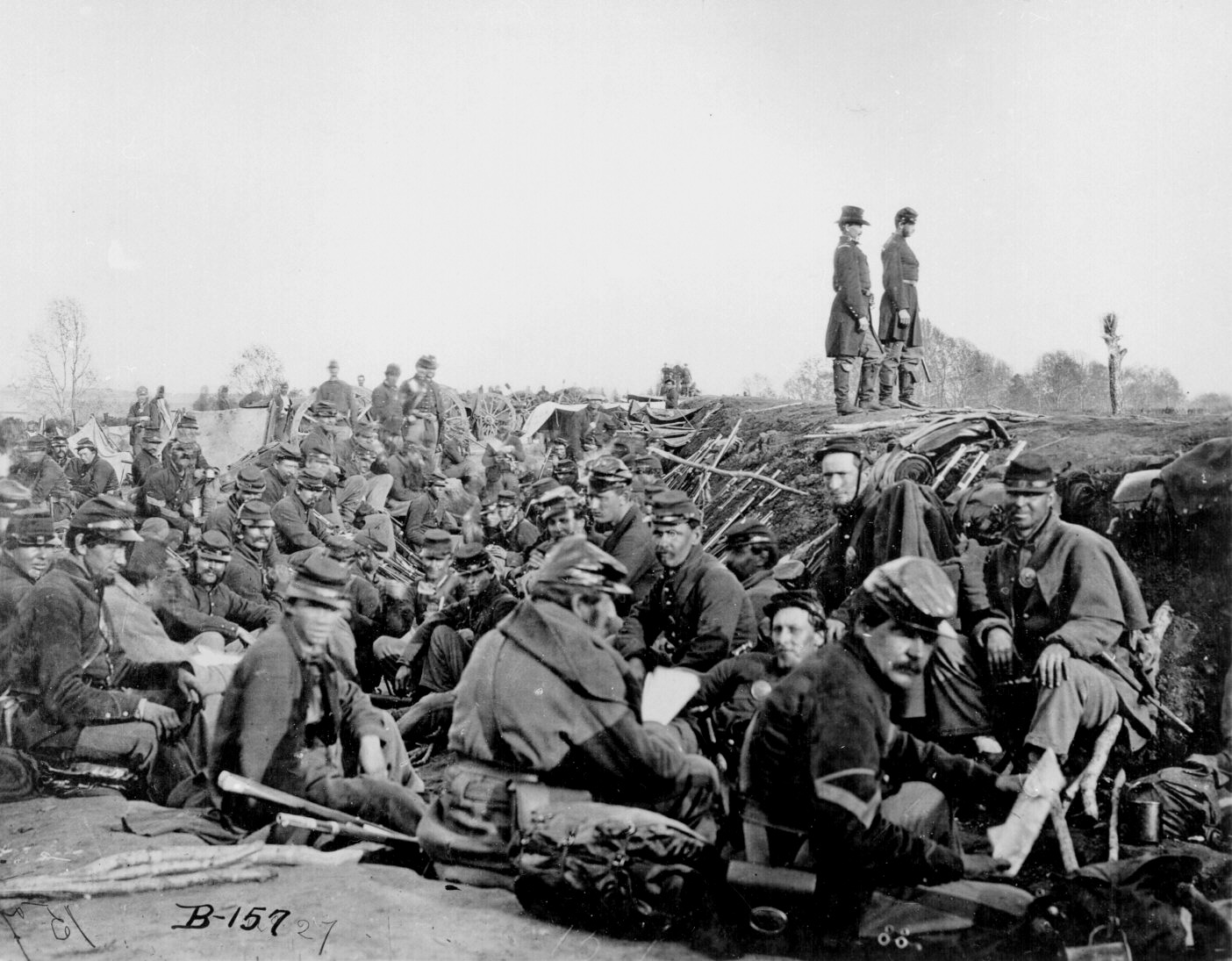
Soldiers of the VI Corps, Army of the Potomac, in trenches before storming Marye's Heights at the Second Battle of Fredericksburg during the Chancellorsville campaign, Virginia, May 1863. This photograph (Library of Congress #B-157) is sometimes mistakenly labeled as taken at the 1864 Siege of Petersburg, Virginia.

By midmorning, two Union attacks against the infamous stone wall on Marye's Heights were repulsed with numerous casualties. A Union party under flag of truce was allowed to approach ostensibly to collect the wounded, but while close to the stone wall, they were able to observe how sparsely the Confederate line was manned. A third Union attack was successful in overrunning the Confederate position. Early was able to organize an effective fighting retreat.

John Sedgwick's road to Chancellorsville was open, but he wasted time in gathering his troops and forming a marching column. His men, led by Brooks's division, followed by Newton and Howe, were delayed for several hours by successive actions against the Alabama brigade of Brig. Gen. Cadmus M. Wilcox. His final delaying line was a ridge at Salem church, where he was joined by three brigades from McLaws's division and one from Anderson's, bringing the total Confederate strength to about 10,000 men.

Artillery fire was exchanged by both sides in the afternoon and at 5:30 p.m., two brigades of Brooks's division attacked on both sides of the Plank Road. The advance south of the road reached as far as the churchyard, but was driven back. The attack north of the road could not break the Confederate line. Wilcox described the action as "a bloody repulse to the enemy, rendering entirely useless to him his little success of the morning at Fredericksburg." Hooker expressed his disappointment in Sedgwick: "my object in ordering General Sedgwick forward ... Was to relieve me from the position in which I found myself at Chancellorsville. ... In my judgment General Sedgwick did not obey the spirit of my order, and made no sufficient effort to obey it. ... When he did move it was not with sufficient confidence or ability on his part to manoeuvre his troops."

The fighting on May 3, 1863, was some of the most furious anywhere in the civil war. The loss of 21,357 men that day in the three battles, divided equally between the two armies, ranks the fighting only behind the Battle of Antietam as the bloodiest day of war in American history.

=== May 4–6: Union withdrawals ===
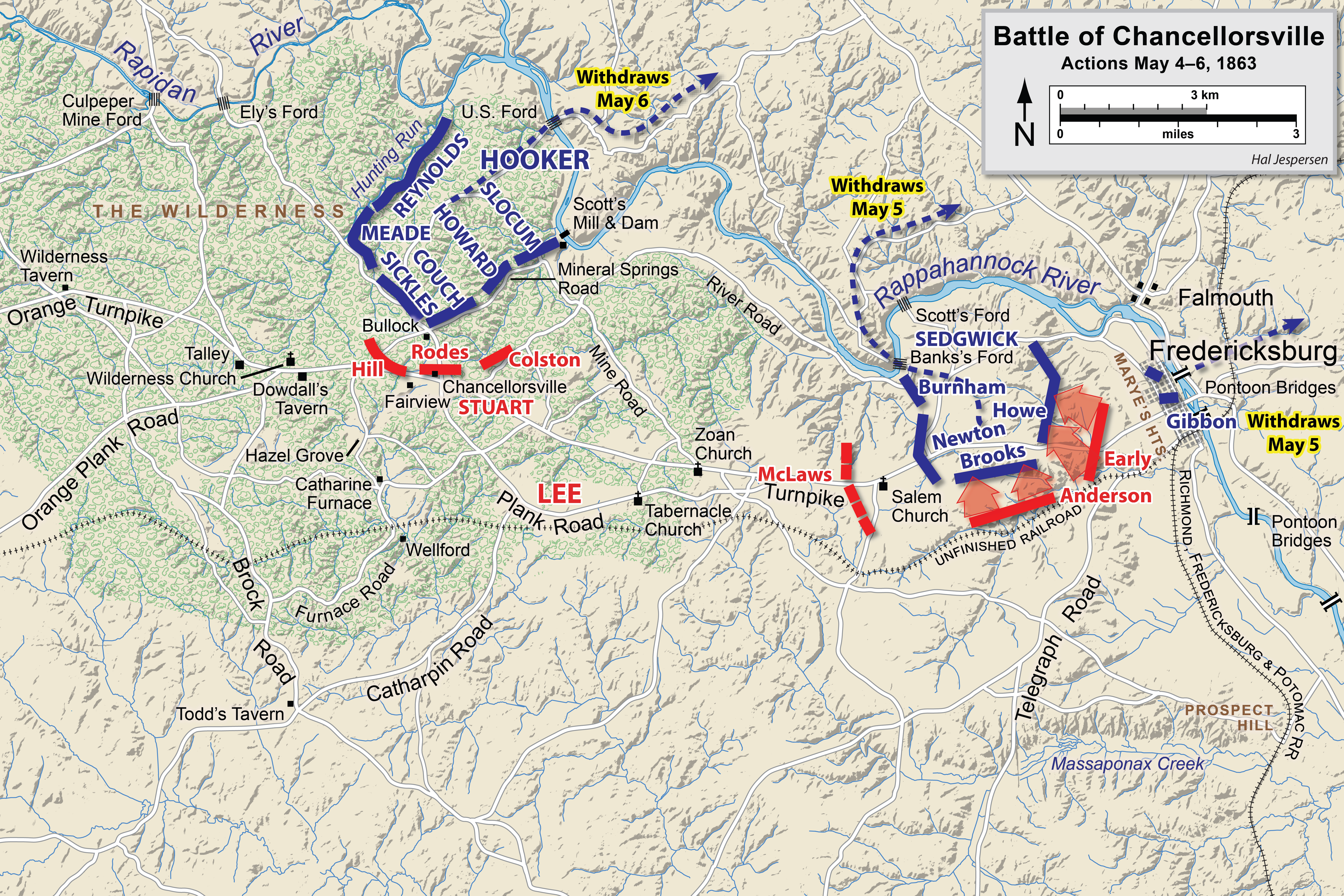
Chancellorsville, actions on May 4, withdrawals on May 5 and 6

On the evening of May 3 and all day May 4, Hooker remained in his defenses north of Chancellorsville. Lee observed that Hooker was threatening no offensive action, so felt comfortable ordering Anderson's division to join the battle against Sedgwick. He sent orders to Early and McLaws to cooperate in a joint attack, but the orders reached his subordinates after dark, so the attack was planned for May 4.

By this time Sedgwick had placed his divisions into a strong defensive position with its flanks anchored on the Rappahannock, three sides of a rectangle extending south of the Plank Road. Early's plan was to drive the Union troops off Marye's Heights and the other high ground west of Fredericksburg. Lee ordered McLaws to engage from the west "to prevent [the enemy] concentrating on General Early."

Early reoccupied Marye's Heights on the morning of May 4, cutting Sedgwick off from the town. However, McLaws was reluctant to take any action. Before noon, Lee arrived with Anderson's division, giving him a total of 21,000 men, slightly outnumbering Sedgwick. Despite Lee's presence, McLaws continued his passive role and Anderson's men took a few hours to get into position, a situation that frustrated and angered both Early and Lee, who had been planning on a concentrated assault from three directions.

The attack finally began around 6 p.m. Two of Early's brigades (under Brig. Gens. Harry T. Hays and Robert F. Hoke) pushed back Sedgwick's left-center across the Plank Road, but Anderson's effort was a slight one and McLaws once again contributed nothing. Throughout the day on May 4, Hooker provided no assistance or useful guidance to Sedgwick, and Sedgwick thought about little else than protecting his line of retreat.

Sedgwick withdrew across the Rappahannock at Banks's Ford during the pre-dawn hours of May 5. When he learned that Sedgwick had retreated back over the river, Hooker felt he was out of options to save the campaign. He called a council of war and asked his corps commanders to vote about whether to stay and fight or to withdraw. Although a majority voted to fight, Hooker had had enough, and on the night of May 5–6, he withdrew back across the river at U.S. Ford.

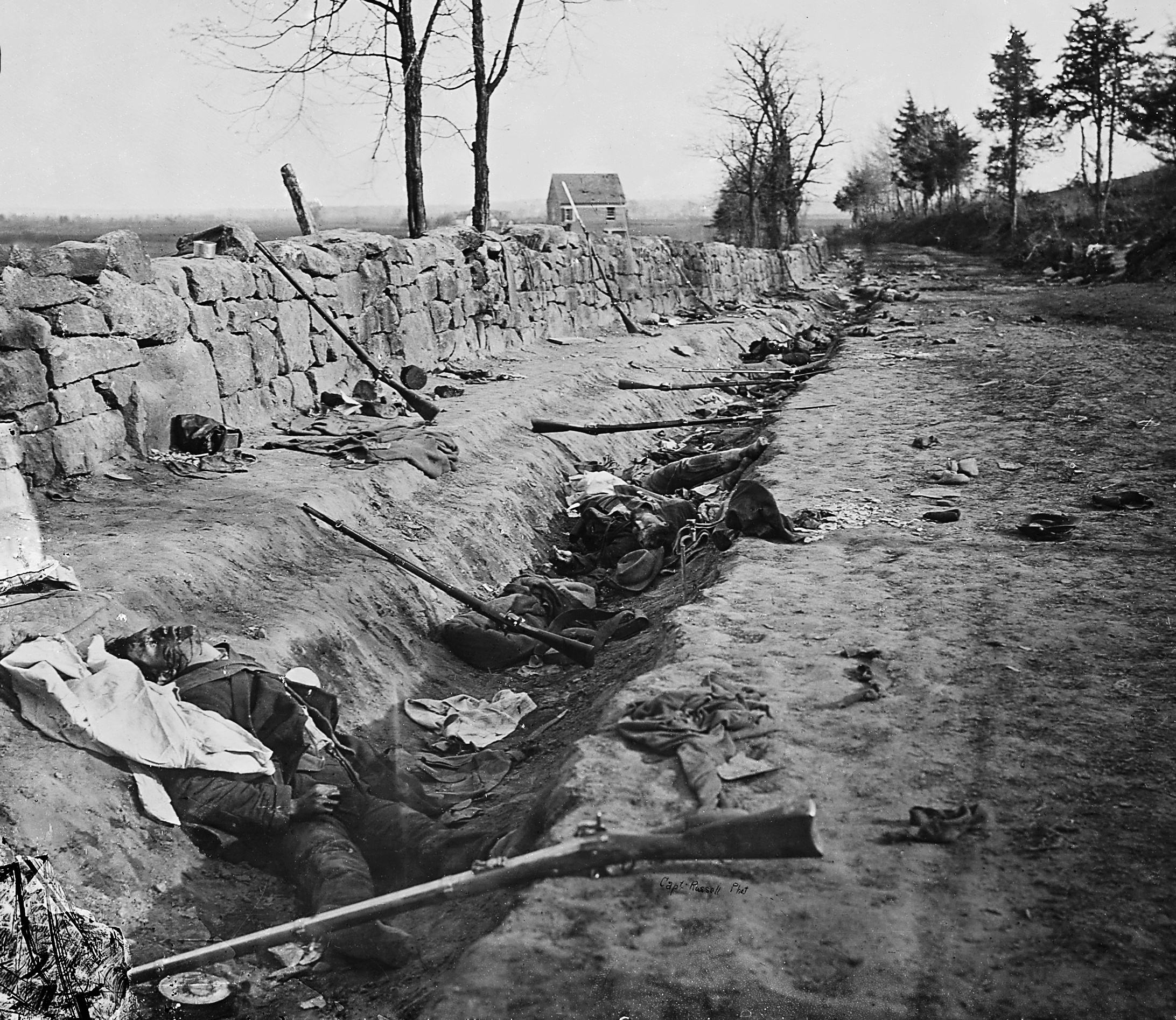
Confederate dead behind the stone wall of Marye's Heights, Fredericksburg, Virginia, killed during the Chancellorsville campaign (the Second Battle of Fredericksburg), May 1863. Photograph by A.J. Russell.

It was a difficult operation. Hooker and the artillery crossed first, followed by the infantry beginning at 6 a.m. on May 6. Meade's V Corps served as the rear guard. Rains caused the river to rise and threatened to break the pontoon bridges.

Couch was in command on the south bank after Hooker departed, but he was left with explicit orders not to continue the battle, which he had been tempted to do. The surprise withdrawal frustrated Lee's plan for one final attack against Chancellorsville. He had issued orders for his artillery to bombard the Union line in preparation for another assault, but by the time they were ready Hooker and his men were gone.

The Union cavalry under Brig. Gen. George Stoneman, after a week of ineffectual raiding in central and southern Virginia in which they failed to attack any of the objectives Hooker established, withdrew into Union lines east of Richmond—the peninsula north of the York River, across from Yorktown—on May 7, ending the campaign.

== Aftermath ==
My God! It is horrible—horrible; and to think of it, 130,000 magnificent soldiers so cut to pieces by less than 60,000 half-starved ragamuffins!

— Horace Greeley, New York Tribune

=== Casualties ===
Senior officer casualties
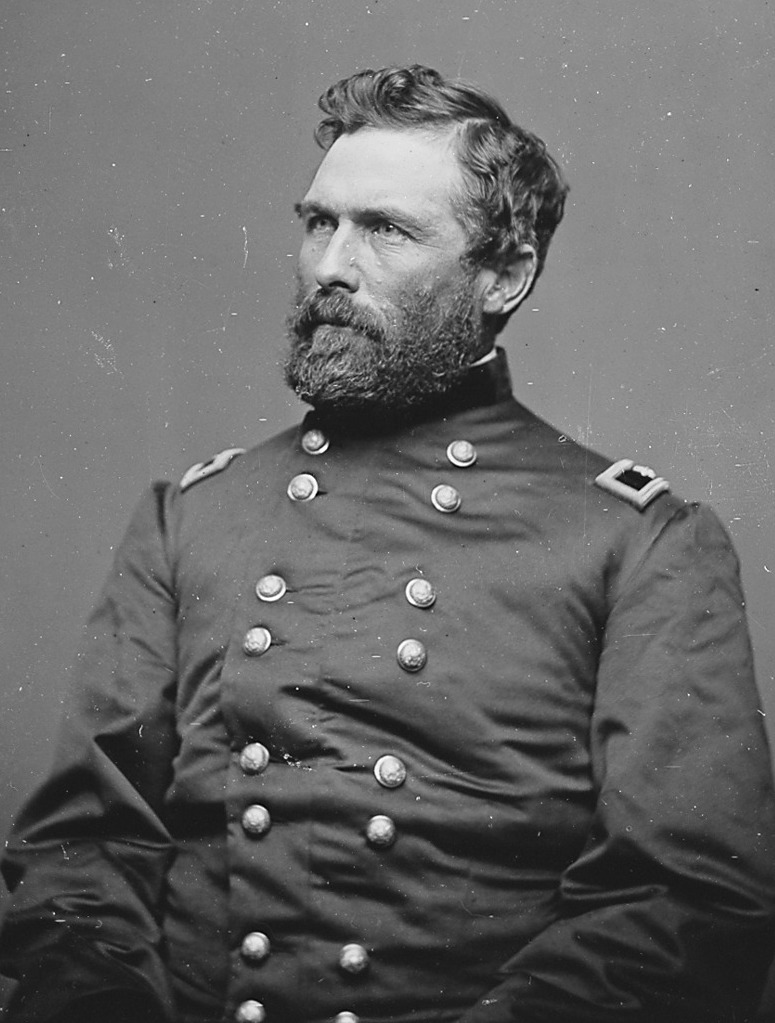
Maj. Gen.
Hiram G. Berry, killed

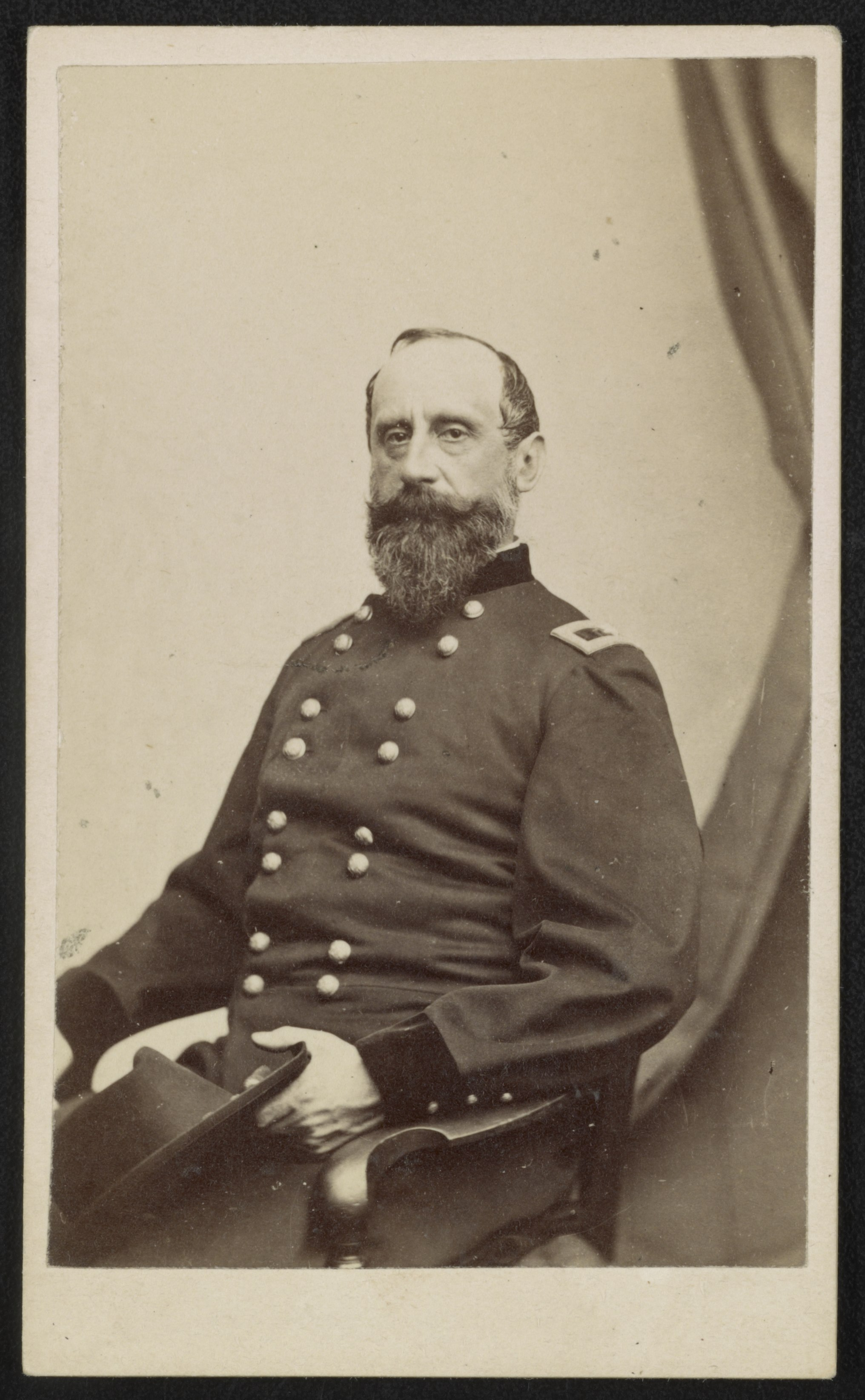
Brig. Gen.
Charles Devens, wounded

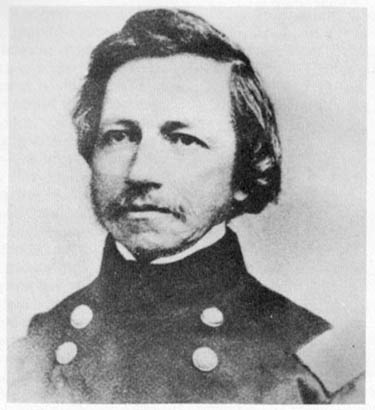
Brig. Gen.
Amiel W. Whipple, mortally wounded

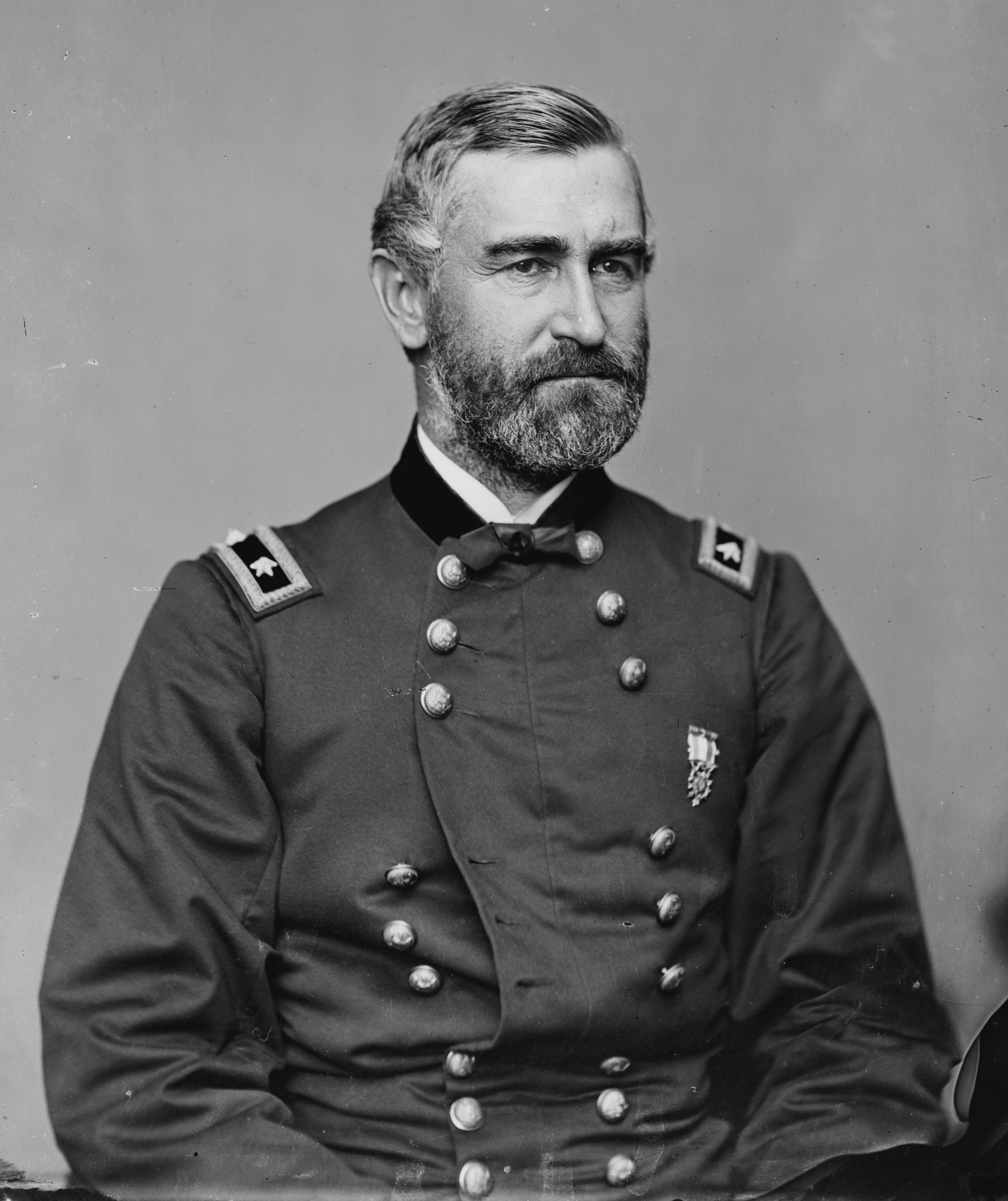
Brig. Gen.
Gershom Mott, wounded

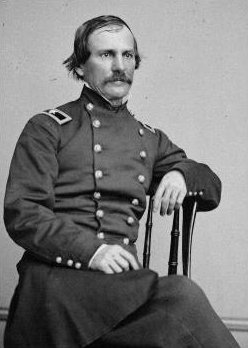
Brig. Gen.
William Hays, wounded

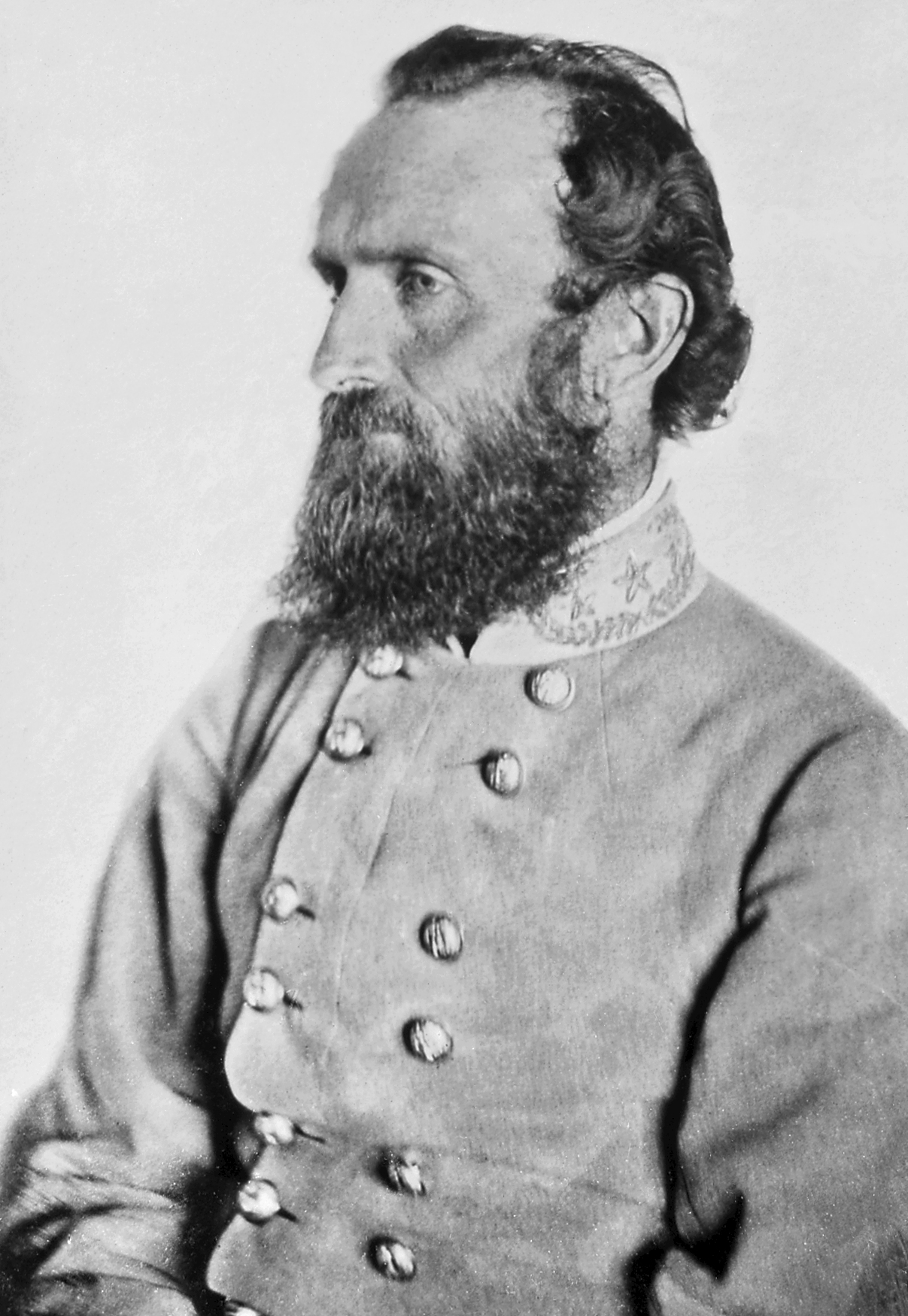
Lt. Gen.
Stonewall Jackson, mortally wounded

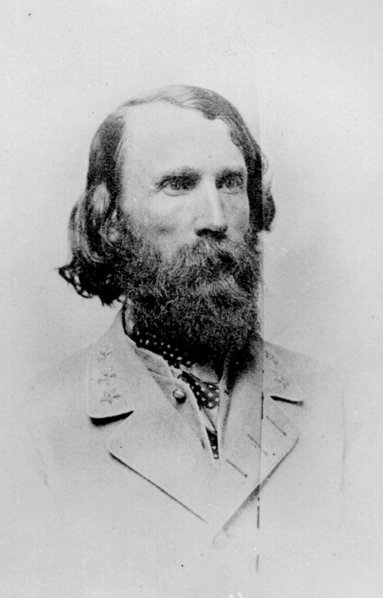
Maj. Gen.
Ambrose P. Hill, wounded

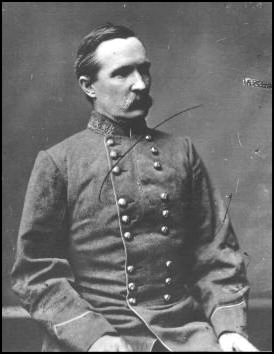
Brig. Gen.
Henry Heth, wounded

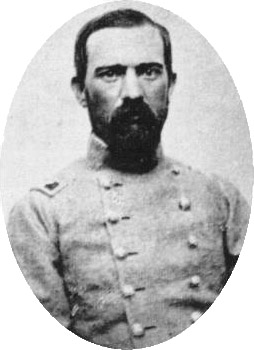
Brig. Gen.
William D. Pender, wounded

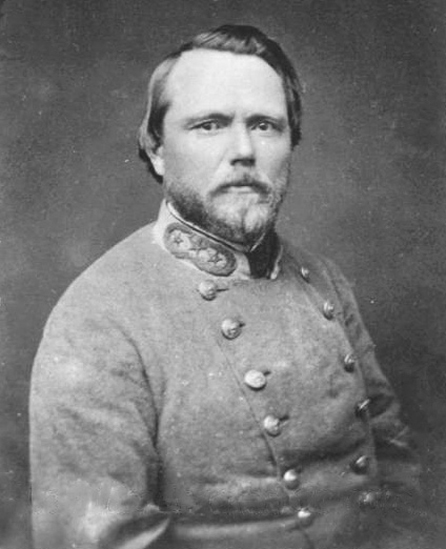
Brig. Gen.
Samuel McGowan, wounded

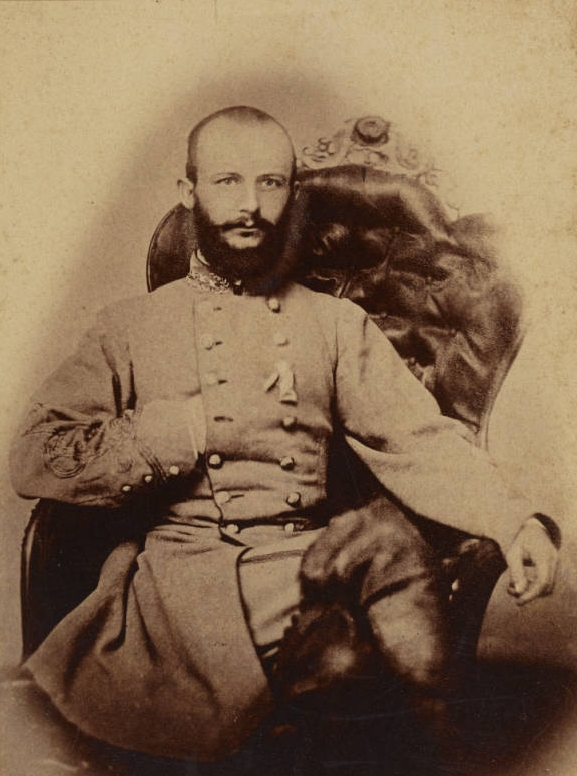
Brig. Gen.
Stephen D. Ramseur, wounded

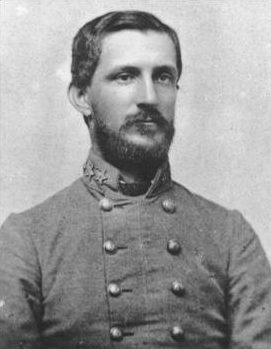
Brig. Gen.
Robert F. Hoke, wounded

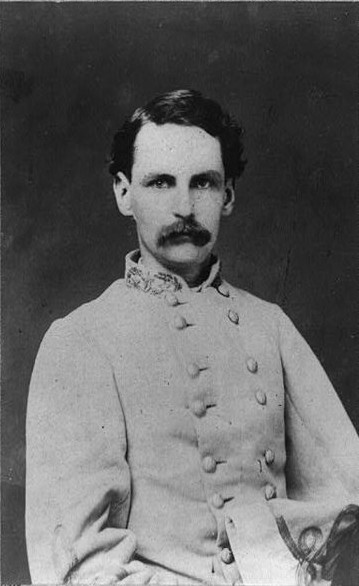
Brig. Gen.
Francis T. Nicholls, wounded

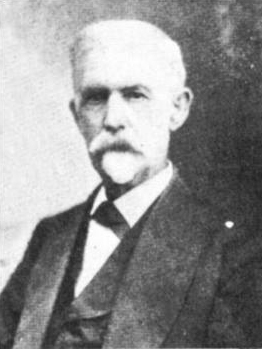
Brig. Gen.
Edward A. O'Neal, wounded

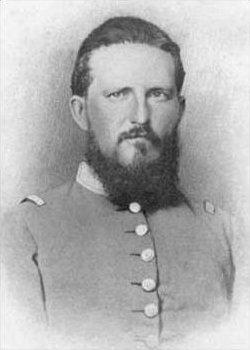
Brig. Gen.
Elisha F. Paxton, killed

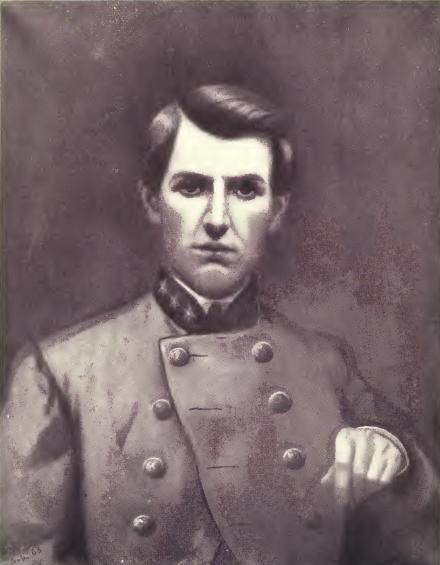
Col.
Stapleton Crutchfield, wounded

Lee, despite being outnumbered by a ratio of over two to one, won arguably his greatest victory of the war, sometimes described as his "perfect battle." But he paid a terrible price for it, taking more casualties than he had lost in any previous battle, including the stalemate at the Battle of Antietam. With only 60,000 men engaged, he suffered 13,303 casualties (1,665 killed, 9,081 wounded, 2,018 missing), losing some 22% of his force in the campaign—men that the Confederacy, with its limited manpower, could not replace. Just as seriously, he lost his most aggressive field commander, Stonewall Jackson. Brig. Gen. Elisha F. Paxton was the other Confederate general killed during the battle. After Longstreet rejoined the main army, he was highly critical of Lee's strategy, saying that battles like Chancellorsville cost the Confederacy more men than it could afford to lose.

Of the 133,000 Union men engaged, 17,197 were casualties (1,606 killed, 9,672 wounded, 5,919 missing), a percentage much lower than Lee's, particularly considering that it includes 4,000 men of the XI Corps who were captured on May 2. When comparing only the killed and wounded, there were almost no differences between the Confederate and Federal losses at Chancellorsville. The Union lost three generals in the campaign: Maj. Gens. Hiram G. Berry and Amiel W. Whipple and Brig. Gen. Edmund Kirby.

=== Assessment of Hooker ===
Lee's Chancellorsville consisted of a pastiche of unbelievably risky gambits that led to a great triumph. Hooker's campaign, after the brilliant opening movements, degenerated into a tale of opportunities missed and troops underutilized.

— Robert K. Krick, Lee's Greatest Victory

Hooker, who began the campaign believing he had "80 chances in 100 to be successful", lost the battle through miscommunication, the incompetence of some of his leading generals (most notably Howard and Stoneman, but also Sedgwick), but mostly through the collapse of his own confidence. Hooker's errors included abandoning his offensive push on May 1 and ordering Sickles to give up Hazel Grove and pull back on May 2. He also erred in his disposition of forces; despite Abraham Lincoln's exhortation, "this time put in all your men," some 40,000 men of the Army of the Potomac scarcely fired a shot. When later asked why he had ordered a halt to his advance on May 1, Hooker is reputed to have responded, "For the first time, I lost faith in Hooker." However, Stephen W. Sears has categorized this as a myth:

Nothing has been more damaging to General Joseph Hooker's military reputation than this, from John Bigelow's The Campaign of Chancellorsville (1910): "A couple of months later, when Hooker crossed the Rappahannock [actually, the Potomac] with the Army of the Potomac in the Campaign of Gettysburg he was asked by General Doubleday: 'Hooker, what was the matter with you at Chancellorsville? ... Hooker answered frankly ... 'Doubleday ... For once I lost confidence in Hooker'."

Sears's research has shown that Bigelow was quoting from a letter written in 1903 by an E. P. Halstead, who was on the staff of Doubleday's I Corps division. There is no evidence that Hooker and Doubleday ever met during the Gettysburg campaign, and they could not have done so since they were dozens of miles apart. Finally, Doubleday made no mention of such a confession from Hooker in his history of the Chancellorsville campaign, published in 1882. Sears concludes:

It can only be concluded that forty years after the event, elderly ex-staff officer Halstead was at best retailing some vaguely remembered campfire tale, and at worst manufacturing a role for himself in histories of the campaign.... Whatever Joe Hooker's failings at Chancellorsville, he did not publicly confess them.

Lincoln later told Connecticut Representative Deming that he believed the war could have been terminated at Chancellorsville had Hooker managed the battle better: specifically, "when Hooker failed to reinforce Sedgwick, after hearing his cannon...." However, he added, "I do not know that I could have given any different orders had I been with them myself. I have not fully made up my mind how I should behave when minie-balls were whistling, and those great oblong shells shrieking in my ear. I might run away."

=== Union reaction ===
The Union was shocked by the defeat. President Abraham Lincoln was quoted as saying, "My God! My God, what will the country say!?" A few generals were career casualties. Hooker relieved Stoneman for incompetence and for years waged a vituperative campaign against Howard, whom he blamed for his loss. He wrote in 1876 that Howard was "a hypocrite ... totally incompetent ... a perfect old woman ... a bad man." He labeled Sedgwick as "dilatory." Couch was so disgusted by Hooker's conduct of the battle (and his incessant political maneuvering) that he resigned and was placed in charge of the Department of the Susquehanna, commanding only Pennsylvania militia.

President Lincoln chose to retain Hooker in command of the army, but the friction between Lincoln, general in chief Henry W. Halleck, and Hooker became intolerable in the early days of what would become known as the Gettysburg campaign and Lincoln relieved Hooker of command on June 28, just before the Battle of Gettysburg. One of the consequences of Chancellorsville at Gettysburg was the conduct of Daniel Sickles, who undoubtedly recalled the terrible consequences of withdrawing from Hazel Grove when he decided to ignore the commands of his general and moved his lines on the second day of battle to ensure that a minor piece of high ground, the Peach Orchard, was not available to the enemy's artillery.

=== Confederate reaction ===
The Confederate public had mixed feelings about the result, joy at Lee's tactical victory tempered by the loss of their most beloved general, Stonewall Jackson. The death of Jackson caused Lee to make the long-needed reorganization of the Army of Northern Virginia from two large corps into three, under James Longstreet, Richard S. Ewell, and A.P. Hill. The new assignments for the latter two generals caused some command difficulties in the upcoming Gettysburg campaign, which began in June. Of more consequence for Gettysburg, however, was the supreme confidence that Lee gained from his great victory at Chancellorsville, that his army was virtually invincible and would succeed at anything he asked it to do.

The specific individuals responsible for the three friendly fire bullets that wounded Jackson were never definitively identified. While Major John Decatur Barry of the 18th North Carolina (a regiment within General James H. Lane's brigade) is widely cited as the officer who ordered the fire—an event that reportedly caused him significant distress until his death in 1867, historians have not confirmed the identity of any individual shooter. The incident was formally classified as a tragic accident; consequently, no disciplinary action or court-martial proceedings were initiated, and the personnel involved remained in active service.

Lee later wrote "At Chancellorsville we gained another victory; our people were wild with delight—I, on the contrary, was more depressed than after Fredericksburg; our loss was severe, and again we gained not an inch of ground and the enemy could not be pursued."

== Additional battle maps ==
=== Gallery: Chancellorsville campaign tactical maps ===
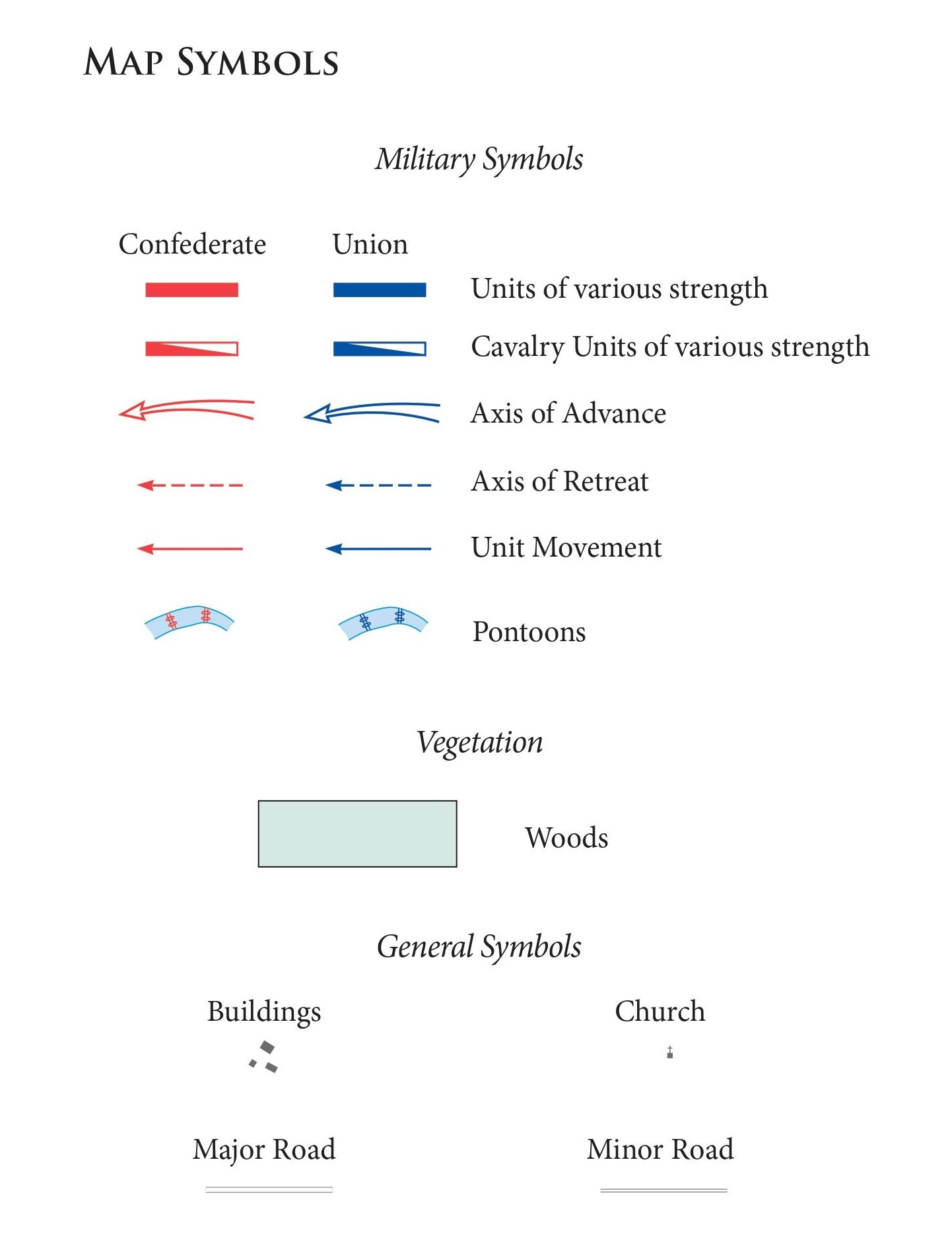
Map symbols

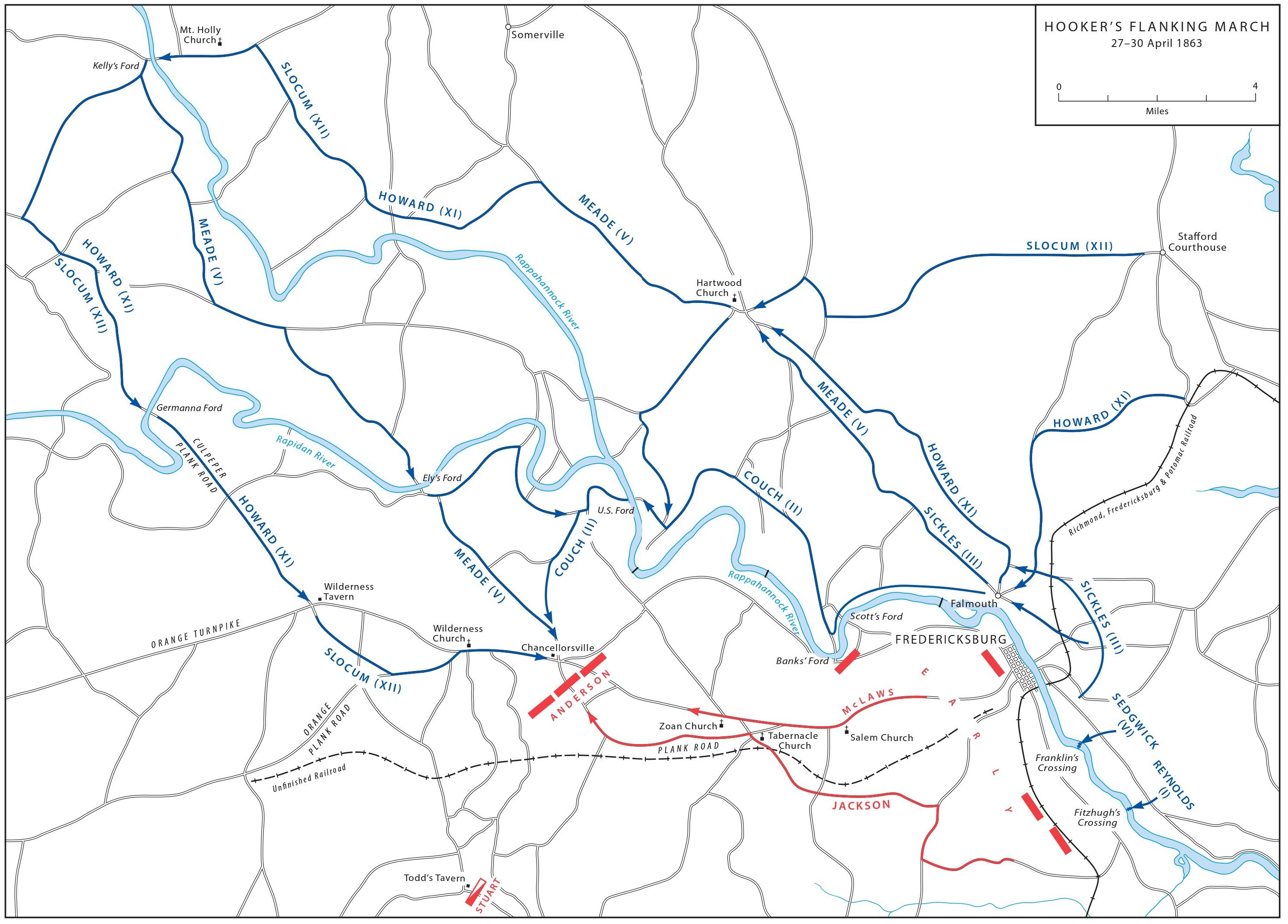
Map 1:
Hooker's Flanking March, 27–30 April 1863

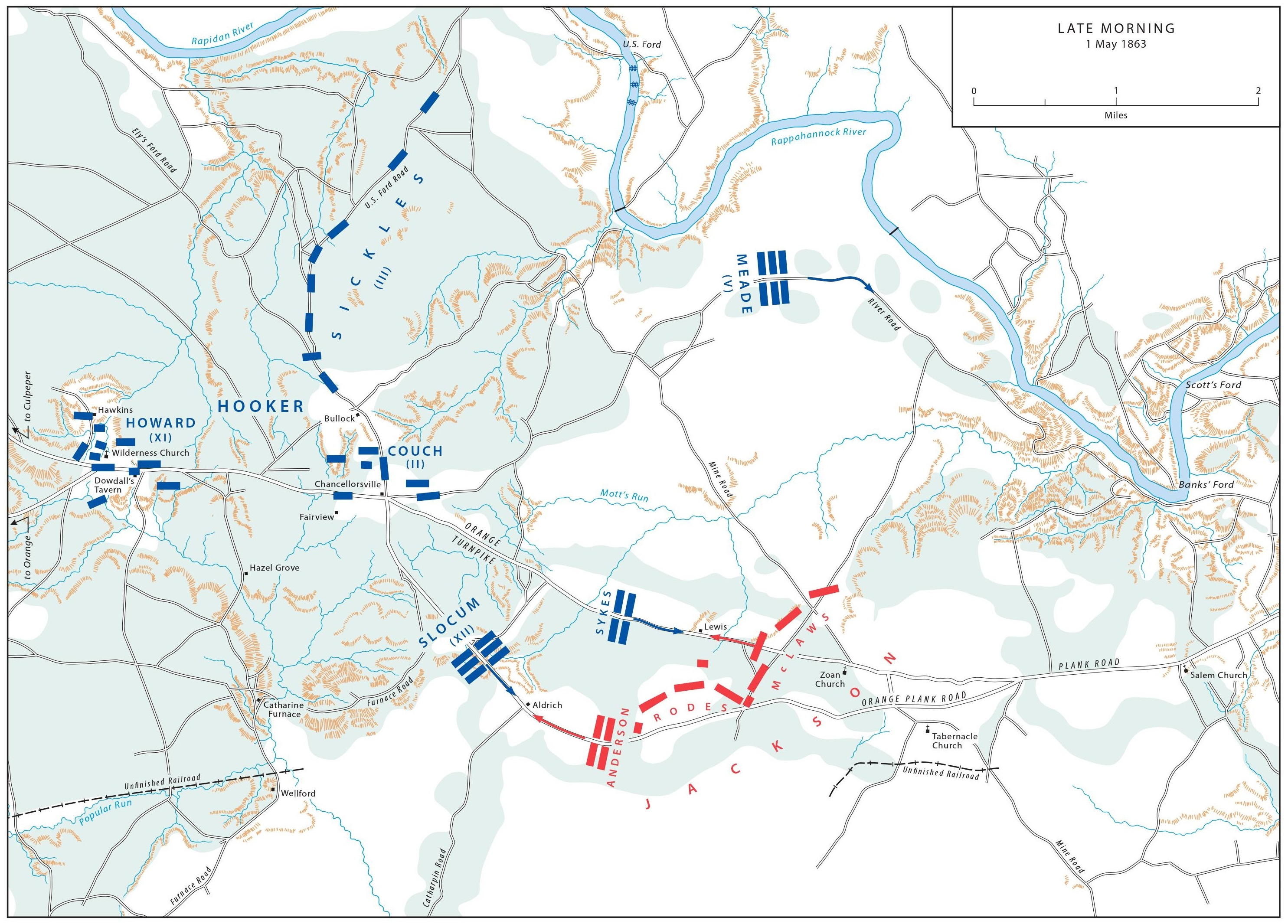
Map 2:
1 May 1863 (late morning)

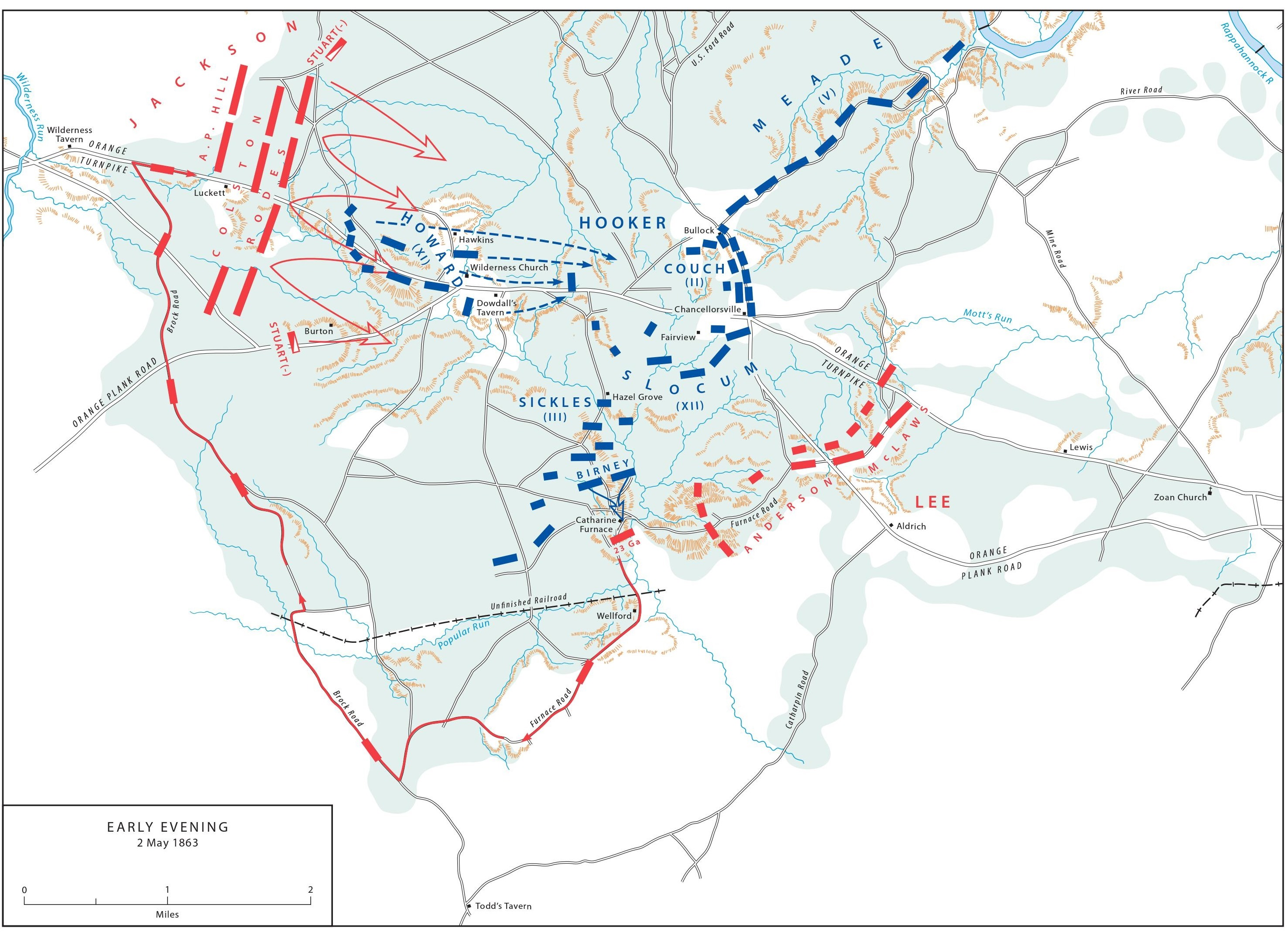
Map 3:
2 May 1863 (early evening)

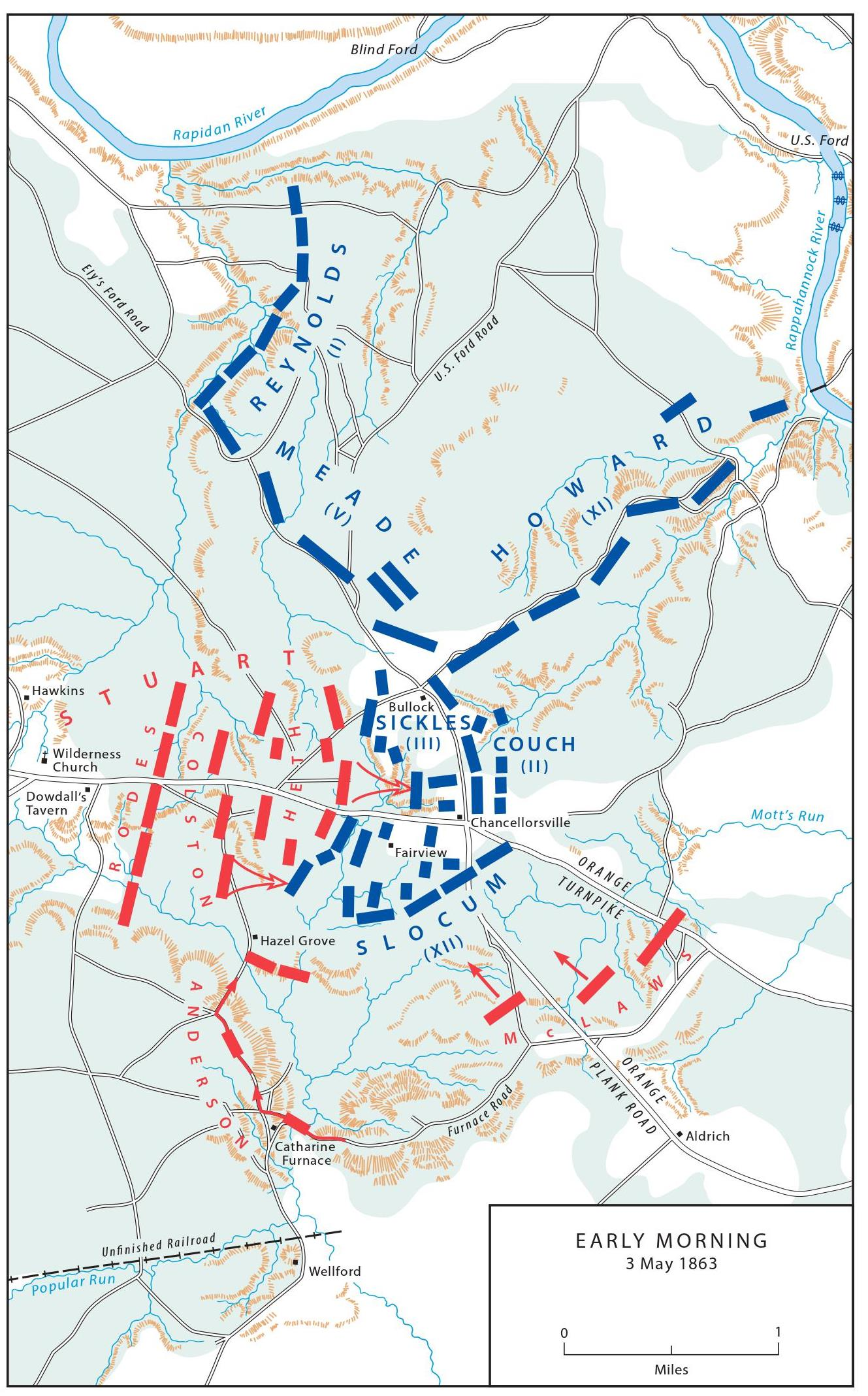
Map 4:
3 May 1863 (early morning)

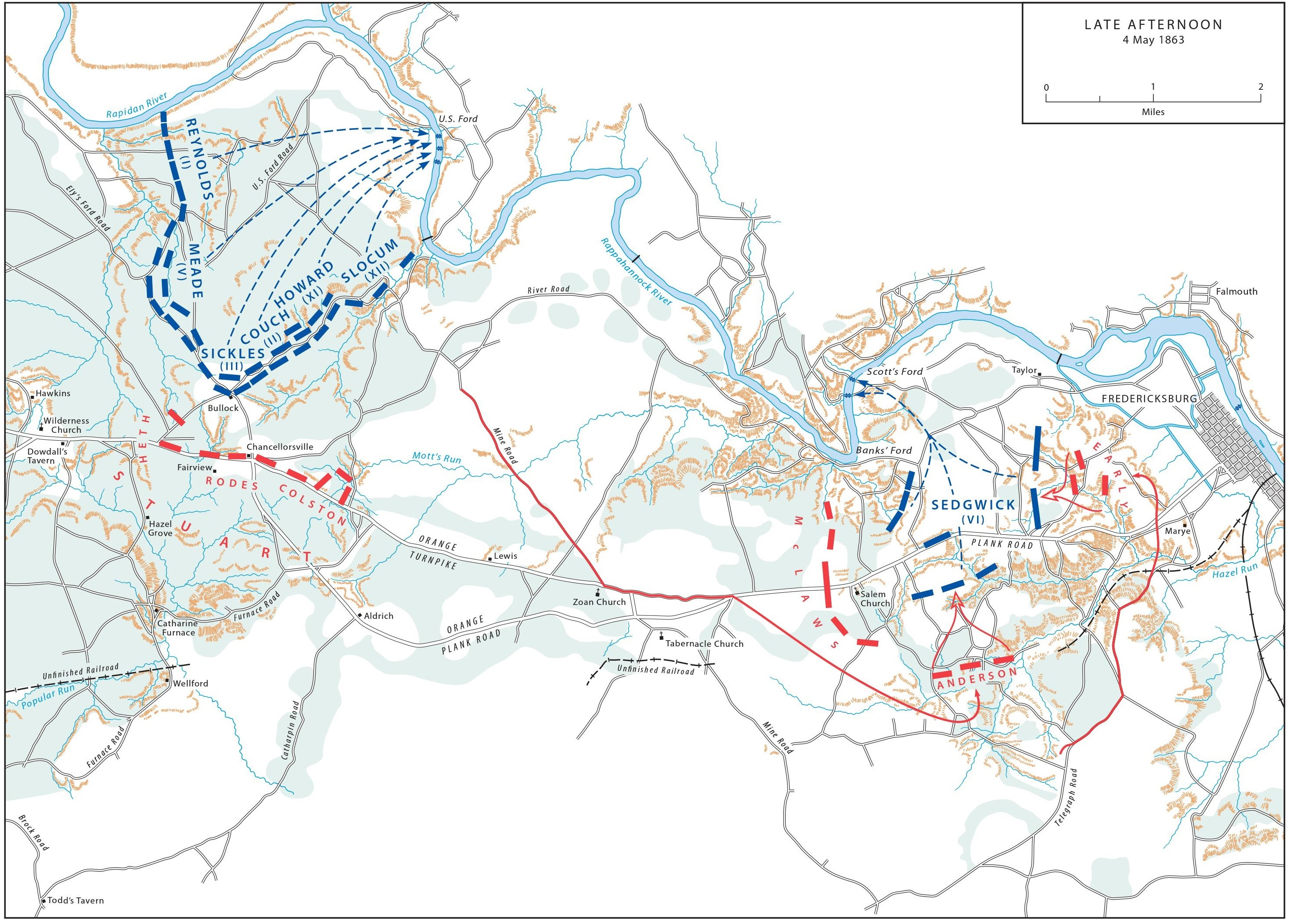
Map 5:
4 May 1863 (late afternoon)

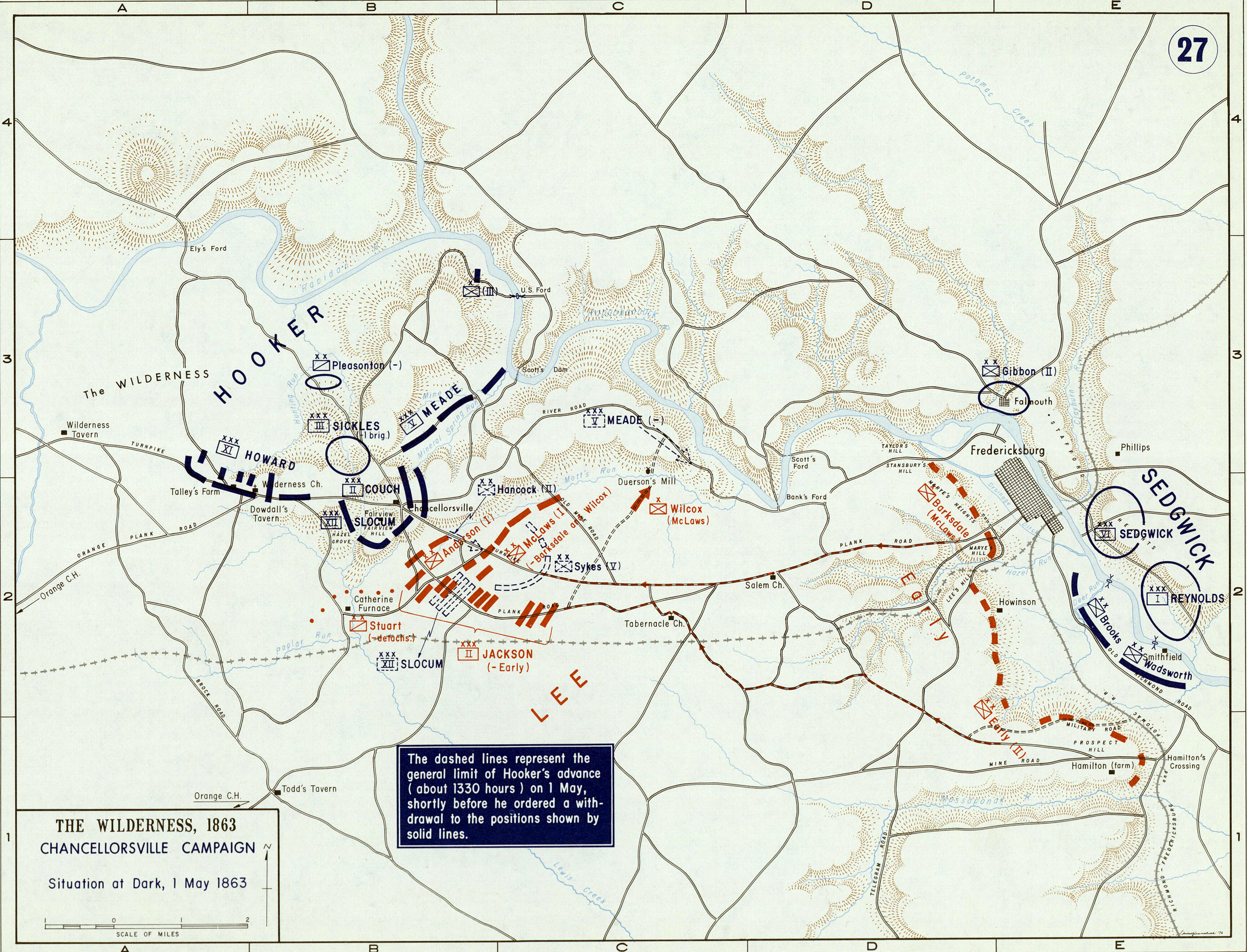
Battle of Chancellorsville
1 May 1863 (Situation at Dark)

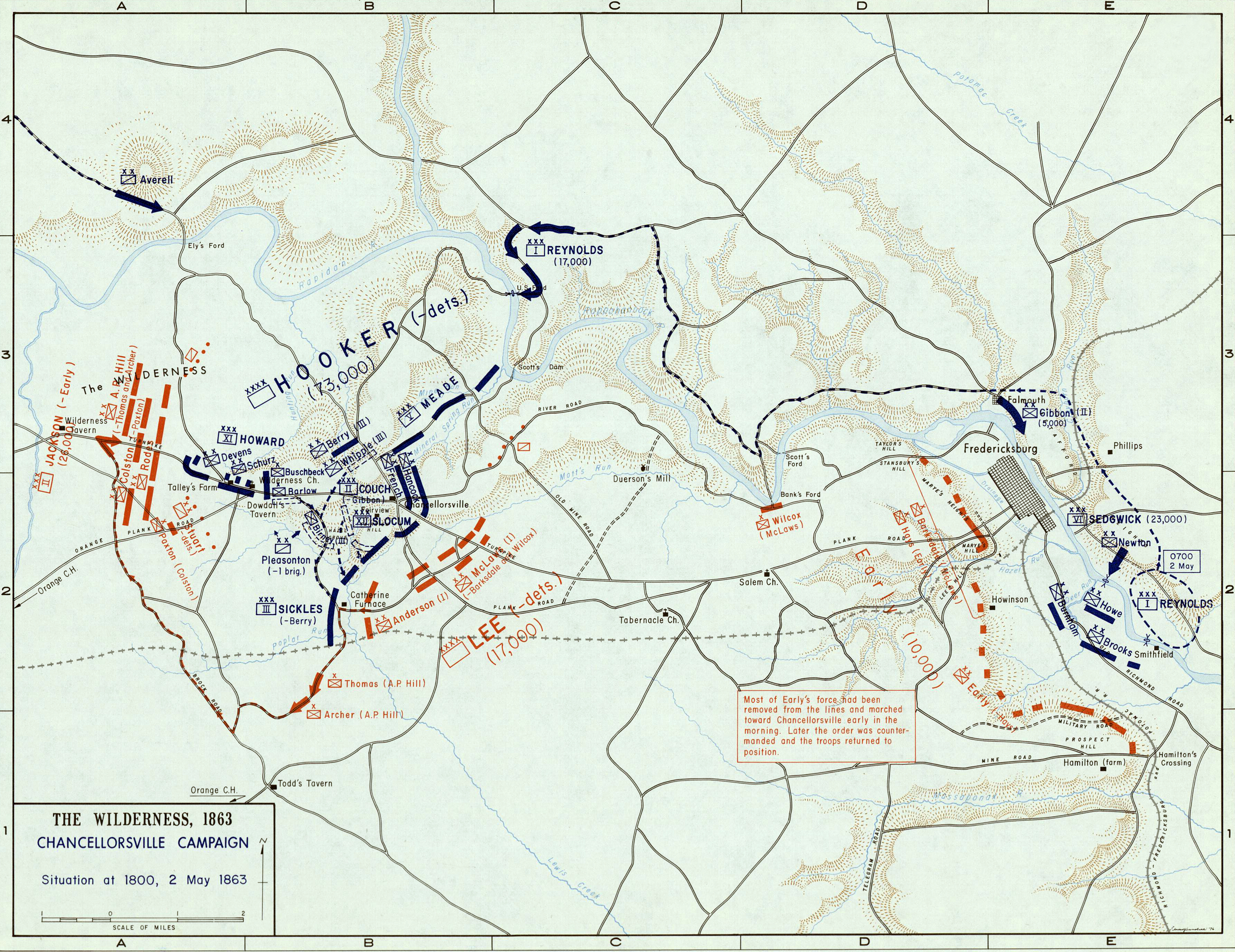
Battle of Chancellorsville
2 May 1863 (Situation at 1800)

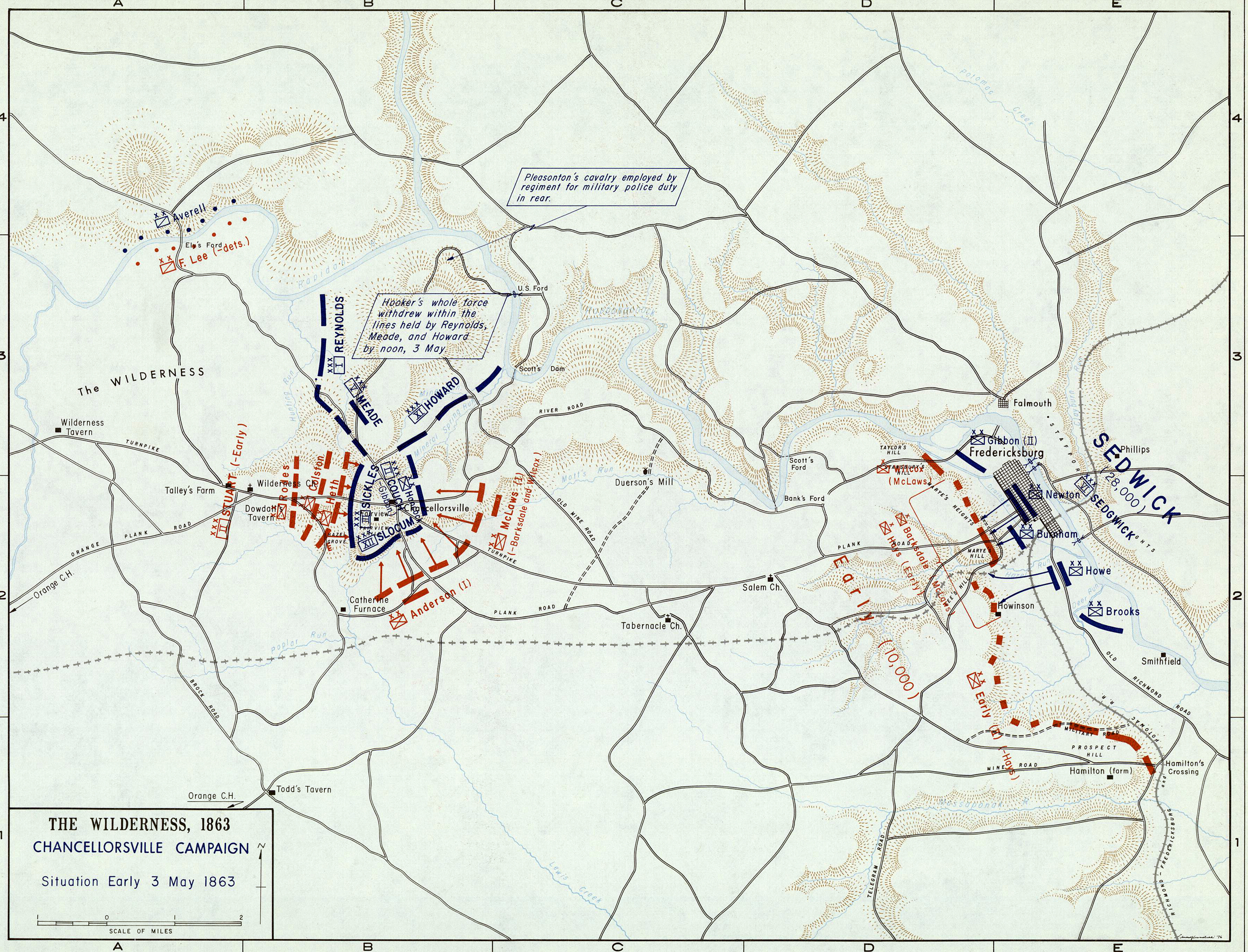
Battle of Chancellorsville
3 May 1863 (Situation Early)

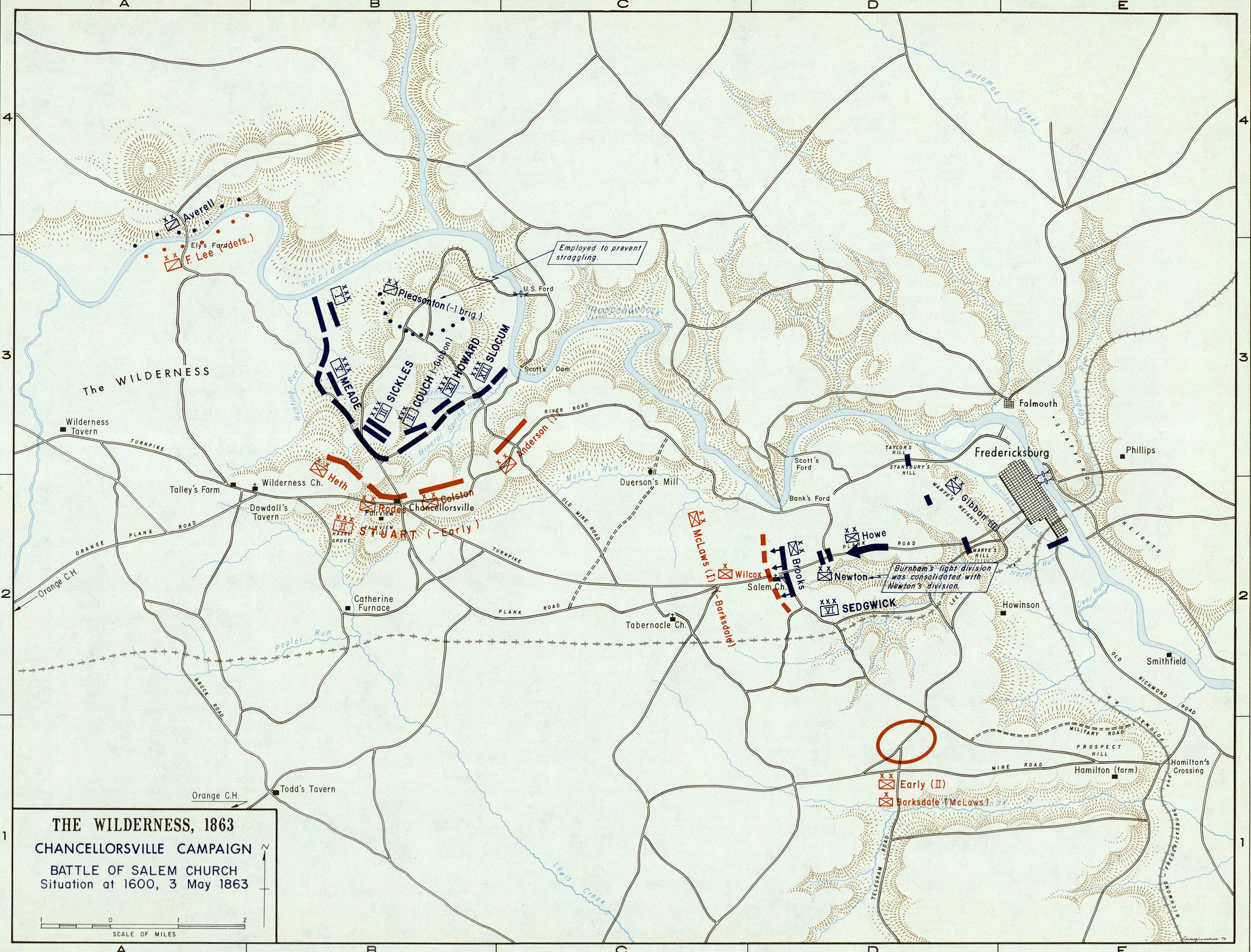
Chancellorsville Campaign
3 May 1863 (Battle of Salem Church: Situation at 1600)

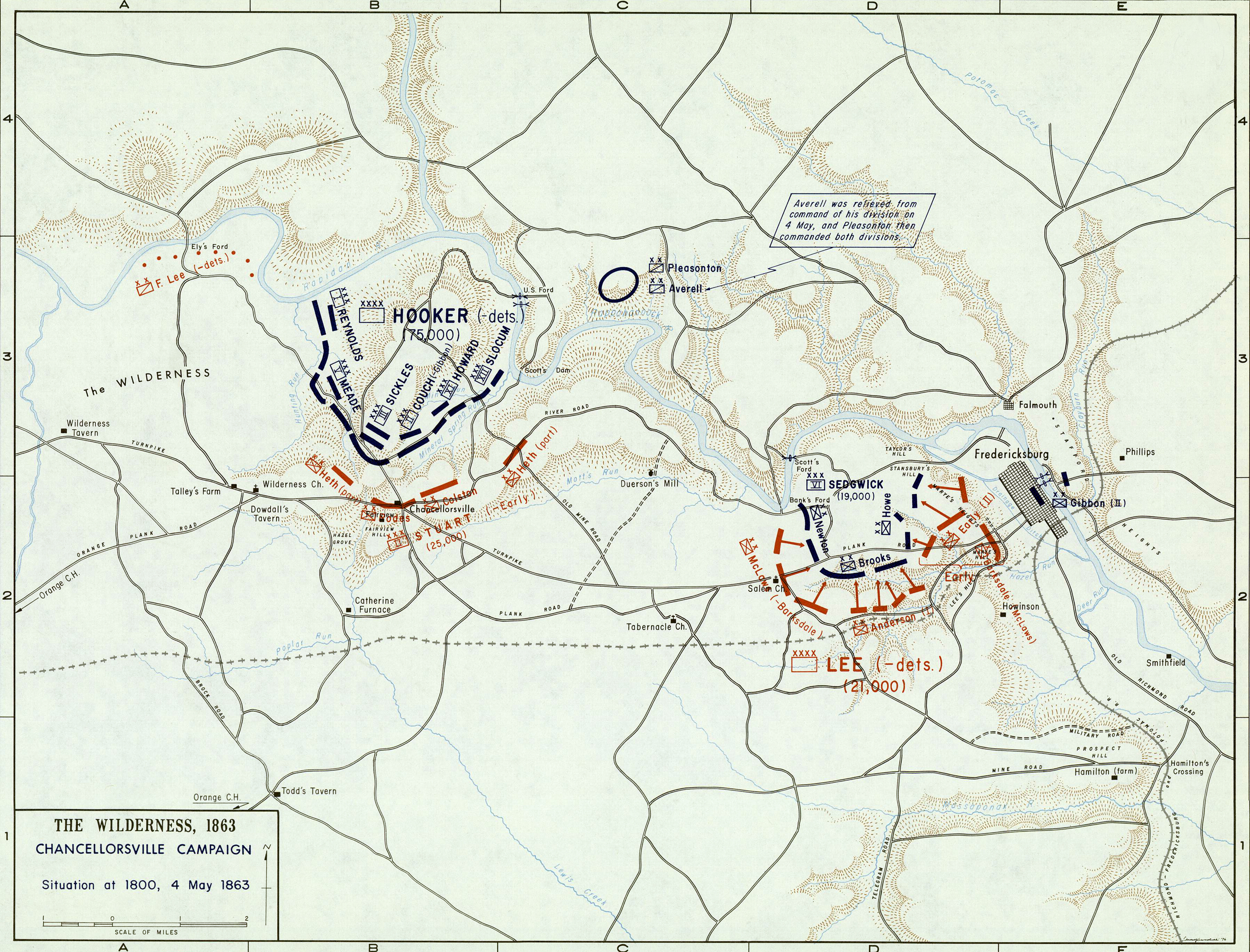
Battle of Chancellorsville
4 May 1863 (Situation at 1800)

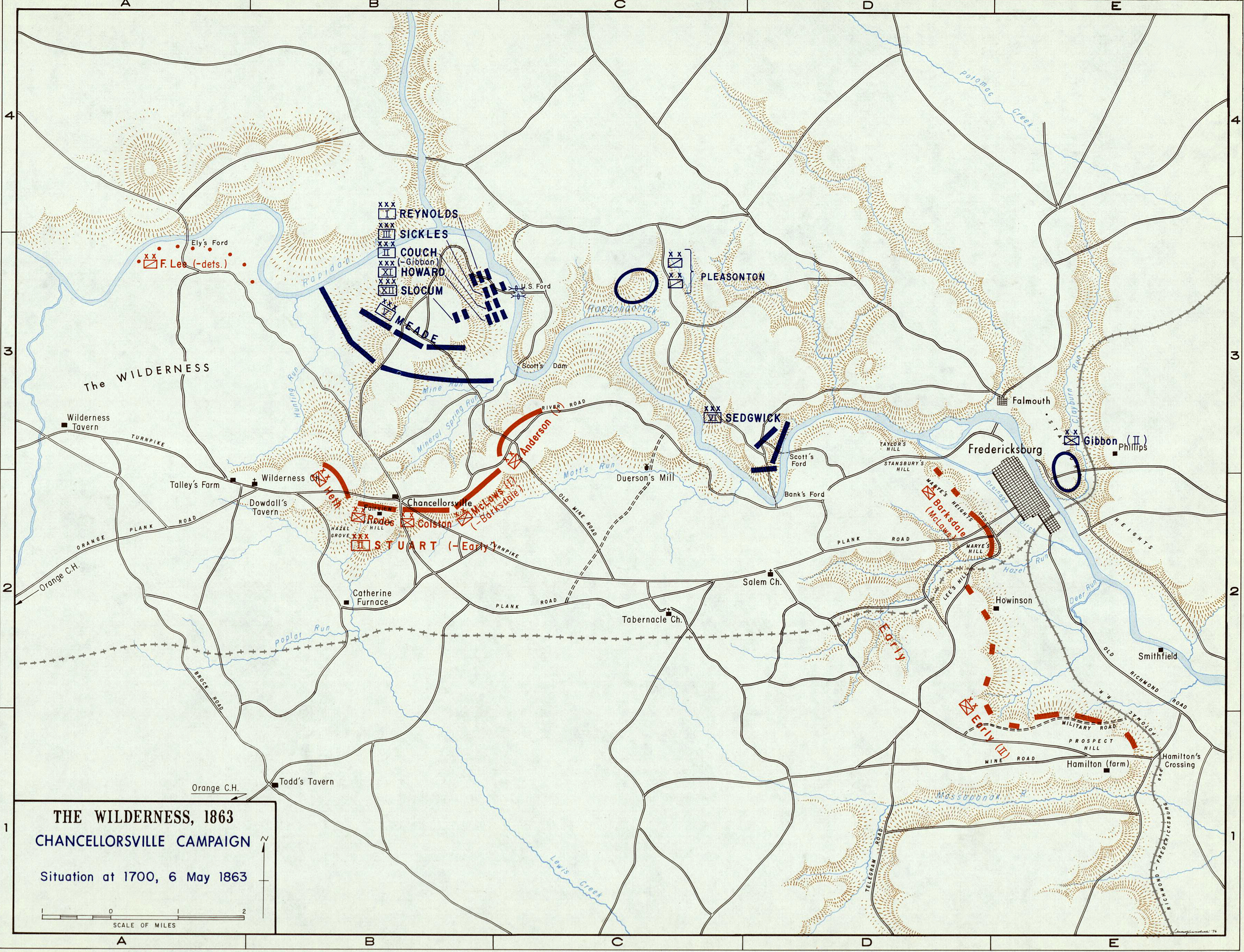
Battle of Chancellorsville
6 May 1863 (Situation at 1700)

== Battlefield preservation ==
- Fredericksburg and Spotsylvania County Battlefields Memorial National Military Park
- U.S. National Register of Historic Places
- U.S. National Military Park
- Virginia Landmarks Register
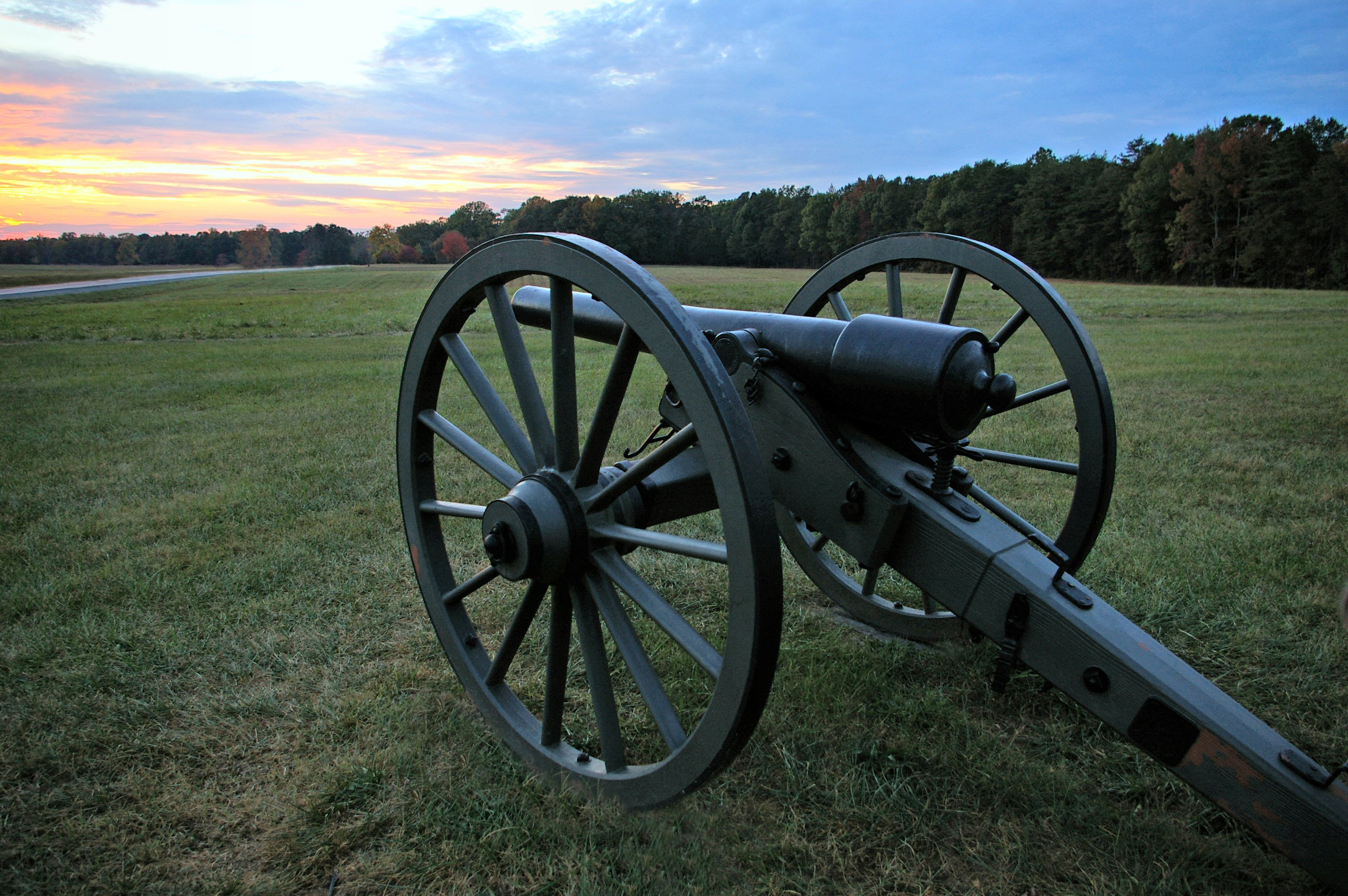
- A piece of artillery.
- Area: 4,601.1 acres (1,862 ha)
- NRHP reference No.: 66000046
- VLR No.: 111-0147

Significant dates
- Added to NRHP: October 15, 1966
- Designated VLR: January 16, 1973

The battlefield was a scene of widespread destruction, covered with dead men and animals. The Chancellor family, whose house was destroyed during the battle, placed the entire 854-acre property for sale four months after the battle. A smaller version of the house was rebuilt using some of the original materials, which served as a landmark for many of the veteran reunions of the late 19th century. In 1927, the rebuilt house was destroyed by fire. That same year, the United States Congress authorized the Fredericksburg and Spotsylvania National Military Park, which preserves some of the land that saw fighting in the 1862 Battle of Fredericksburg, the Chancellorsville campaign, the Battle of the Wilderness, and the Battle of Spotsylvania Court House (the latter two being key battles in the 1864 Overland Campaign).

In May 2002, a regional developer announced a plan to build 2,300 houses and 2,000,000 square feet of commercial space on the 790-acre Mullins Farm, site of the first day of fighting at the Battle of Chancellorsville. Soon thereafter, the American Battlefield Trust, then known as The Civil War Trust, formed the Coalition to Save Chancellorsville, a network of national and local preservation groups that waged a vocal campaign against the development.

For nearly a year, the Coalition mobilized local citizens, held candlelight vigils and hearings, and encouraged residents to become more involved in preservation. Public opinion polling conducted by the Coalition found that more than two-thirds of local residents opposed the development. The survey also found that 90 percent of local residents believed their county has a responsibility to protect Chancellorsville and other historic resources.

As a result of these efforts, in March 2003 the Spotsylvania County Board of Supervisors denied the rezoning application that would have allowed for the development of the site. Immediately following the vote, the Civil War Trust and other Coalition members began working to acquire the battlefield. By working with county officials and developers, the Trust acquired 140 acres in 2004 and another 74 acres in 2006. The American Battlefield Trust and its federal, state and local partners have acquired and preserved 1,365 acres (5.52 km^{2}) of the battlefield in more than 15 different transactions from 2002 through mid-2023.

== In popular media ==
The battle formed the basis for Stephen Crane's 1895 novel The Red Badge of Courage.

The battle serves as the background for one of F. Scott Fitzgerald's short stories, published in the February 1935 Esquire Magazine, entitled "The Night at Chancellorsville."

The Battle of Chancellorsville was depicted in the 2003 film Gods and Generals, based on the novel of the same name. The treatment of the battle in both the novel and the movie focuses on Jackson's assault on the Union right flank, his wounding, and his subsequent death.

== See also ==
- List of American Civil War battles
- Troop engagements of the American Civil War, 1863
- Battle of Fredericksburg and Mud March
- Second Battle of Fredericksburg
- Battle of Salem Church
- Battle of Banks Ford
- List of costliest American Civil War land battles
- Armies in the American Civil War
- Bibliography of the American Civil War
- Bibliography of Abraham Lincoln
- Bibliography of Ulysses S. Grant
- USS Robert Smalls, formerly the USS Chancellorsville
