= National Register of Historic Places listings in Chesterfield County, Virginia =

Location of Chesterfield County in Virginia

This is a list of the National Register of Historic Places listings in Chesterfield County, Virginia.

This is intended to be a complete list of the properties and districts on the National Register of Historic Places in Chesterfield County, Virginia, United States. The locations of National Register properties and districts for which the latitude and longitude coordinates are included below, may be seen in an online map.

There are 29 properties and districts listed on the National Register in the county, including 1 National Historic Landmark.

This National Park Service list is complete through NPS recent listings posted April 24, 2026.

== Current listings ==
	Name on the Register	Image	Date listed	Location	City or town	Description
1	Azurest South	Azurest South	December 30, 1993 (#93001464)	2900 Boisseau St. 37°14′26″N 77°25′02″W	Petersburg	Designated a National Historic Landmark in 2024.
2	Beach Station	Beach Station	February 22, 2008 (#08000067)	11410 and 11400 Beach Rd. 37°21′21″N 77°35′41″W	Chesterfield	Boundaries decreased on March 24, 2010
3	Bellona Arsenal	Bellona Arsenal	May 6, 1971 (#71000975)	Off Old Gun Rd., northwest of its junction with State Route 147; 37°33′16″N 77°37′03″W	Midlothian	
4	Bellwood	Bellwood	December 12, 1978 (#78003013)	8000 U.S. Route 301; 37°24′50″N 77°26′19″W	Richmond	Plantation house originally known as Sheffields and later as Auburn Chase. Boundary increase on August 1, 2013.
5	Bethel Baptist Church	Bethel Baptist Church	February 22, 1999 (#99000141)	1100 Huguenot Springs Rd. 37°30′35″N 77°42′40″W	Midlothian	
6	Bon Air Historic District	Bon Air Historic District	November 15, 1988 (#88002178)	Roughly bounded by Forest Hill Rd., N. Robert, W. Bon View Dr., and McRae Rd. 37°31′34″N 77°33′26″W	Richmond	
7	Bridge at Falling Creek	Bridge at Falling Creek	October 12, 1995 (#95001171)	U.S. Routes 1/301 at Falling Creek; 37°26′23″N 77°26′21″W	Richmond	
8	Castlewood	Castlewood	November 21, 1976 (#76002099)	State Route 10; 37°22′30″N 77°30′10″W	Chesterfield	
9	Chester Presbyterian Church	Chester Presbyterian Church	November 21, 1976 (#76002098)	Junction of State Route 10 and Osborne Rd. 37°21′34″N 77°25′51″W	Chester	
10	Chesterfield County Courthouse and Courthouse Square	Chesterfield County Courthouse and Courthouse Square	August 18, 1992 (#92001008)	Northern side of State Route 10, 350 feet (110 m) east of its junction with Beach Rd. 37°22′36″N 77°30′25″W	Chesterfield	
11	Dale's Pale Archeological District	Dale's Pale Archeological District	January 19, 2007 (#06001012)	Western terminus of the Bermuda Hundred peninsula 37°20′27″N 77°17′41″W	Chester	
12	Dinwiddie County Pullman Car	Dinwiddie County Pullman Car	July 3, 1991 (#91000834)	Hallsboro Yard, northeast of the junction of Mount Hermon and County Line Rds. 37°28′59″N 77°44′12″W	Midlothian	
13	Eppington	Eppington	November 12, 1969 (#69000230)	South of the junction of River and Eppes Falls Rds. 37°17′45″N 77°43′38″W	Winterpock	
14	Falling Creek Ironworks Archeological Site	Falling Creek Ironworks Archeological Site	March 29, 1995 (#95000242)	Just above the waterfalls on Falling Creek; 37°26′20″N 77°26′07″W	Richmond	
15	Falling Creek UDC Jefferson Davis Highway Marker	Falling Creek UDC Jefferson Davis Highway Marker	January 23, 2013 (#12001220)	U.S. Route 1 at the Falling Creek Wayside; 37°26′20″N 77°26′20″W	Richmond	
16	Fuqua Farm	Fuqua Farm	June 5, 2017 (#100001039)	8700 Bethia Rd. 37°23′12″N 77°40′55″W	Chesterfield	A boundary decrease was approved August 14, 2024.
17	Hallsboro Store	Hallsboro Store	March 10, 2005 (#05000133)	920 Hallsboro Rd. 37°29′19″N 77°43′35″W	Midlothian	
18	Hallsborough Tavern	Hallsborough Tavern	March 17, 1980 (#80004181)	West of Midlothian on U.S. Route 60; 37°30′31″N 77°42′39″W	Midlothian	
19	Henrico	Henrico	April 13, 1972 (#72001400)	251 Henricus Park Rd. 37°22′31″N 77°21′41″W	Dutch Gap	
20	Kingsland	Kingsland	September 18, 1975 (#75002019)	1608 Willis Rd. 37°24′14″N 77°24′48″W	Chimney Corner	
21	Magnolia Grange	Magnolia Grange	March 17, 1980 (#80004179)	State Route 10; 37°22′30″N 77°30′24″W	Chesterfield	
22	Olive Hill	Olive Hill	April 3, 1975 (#75002017)	0.5 miles (0.80 km) west of Matoaca off State Route 36; 37°13′32″N 77°29′44″W	Matoaca	
23	Pleasant View	Pleasant View	June 10, 1975 (#75002018)	1.5 miles (2.4 km) east of Midlothian on Old Buckingham Rd. 37°30′42″N 77°37′17″W	Midlothian	
24	Pocahontas State Park Historic District	Pocahontas State Park Historic District	February 8, 2016 (#15001054)	10301 State Park Rd. 37°23′06″N 77°35′04″W	Chesterfield	
25	Point of Rocks	Point of Rocks	March 10, 2005 (#05000134)	1005 Point of Rocks Rd. 37°19′12″N 77°20′14″W	Chester	
26	Proctor Creek, Jefferson Davis Highway Marker	Proctor Creek, Jefferson Davis Highway Marker	September 12, 2008 (#08000892)	9300 block of U.S. Route 301; 37°23′49″N 77°25′51″W	Richmond	
27	Swift Creek Mill	Swift Creek Mill	January 11, 1974 (#74002113)	North of Colonial Heights on U.S. Route 1; 37°17′00″N 77°24′41″W	Colonial Heights	
28	Town of Bermuda Hundred Historic District	Town of Bermuda Hundred Historic District	November 8, 2006 (#06001011)	Both sides of Bermuda Hundred and Allied Rds. 37°20′29″N 77°16′22″W	Chester	
29	Vawter Hall and Old President's House	Vawter Hall and Old President's House	May 7, 1980 (#80004180)	Virginia State University campus 37°14′06″N 77°25′04″W	Ettrick	

== See also ==
- List of National Historic Landmarks in Virginia
- National Register of Historic Places listings in Virginia
- National Register of Historic Places listings in Colonial Heights, Virginia
- National Register of Historic Places listings in Petersburg, Virginia
