= Castlewood =

Castlewood may refer to:

== Places ==
=== United States ===
- Castlewood, Colorado, a town
- Castlewood, South Dakota, a town
- Castlewood, Virginia, a city
  - Castlewood High School
  - Castlewood (Chesterfield, Virginia), a historic plantation listed on the National Register of Historic Places
- Castlewood State Park, near Ballwin, Missouri
- Castlewood Canyon State Park, near Franktown, Colorado

=== Canada ===
- Orangeville/Castlewood Field Aerodrome, in Ontario
- Castlewood Lake, in Saskatchewan

== Other ==
- Castlewood Orb Drive, a removable storage disk drive
- Castlewood - the name of fictional locations (in Hampshire and in Virginia) in novels by William Makepeace Thackeray
