= Otterdale =

Coordinates: 37.437°N 77.710°W

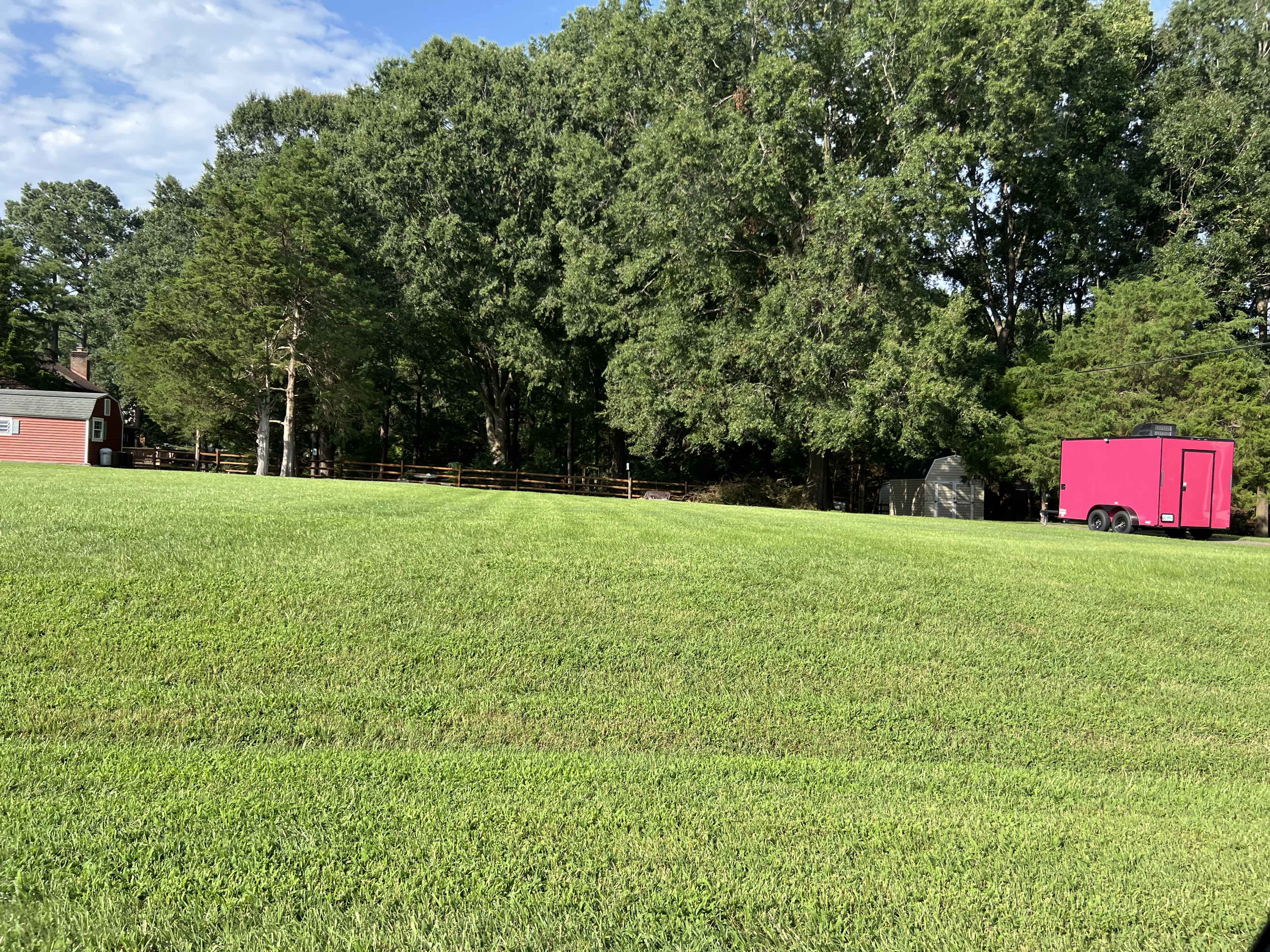
Approximate location of Otterdale.

Otterdale was a farm located east of Otterdale Road close to the Swift Creek Reservoir in Chesterfield County, Virginia. The main house was originally built by Col. Woodson W. Hancock (1789 - 1883) in 1834 and was a 1½-story central-passage house. Around 1855 the house was enlarged by an addition that consisted of a 2-story, side passage plan style house. Woodson Wingfield Hancock was a renowned county leader in politics, the militia, and agriculture. Using the neighboring Otter Creek (now known as Otterdale Branch), Hancock engineered a system of irrigation in which he built a dike at the creek's furthest point downstream that was on his property. Every winter the dike would be closed and water would overflow into the low lying surrounding land. This would deposit a rich cover of silt on top of the farmland. In the spring the dike would be opened so the water could flow out just before plowing. This system of farming gave Col. Hancock exceptionally bountiful harvests.

In 1884, shortly after Col. Hancock's death, the 560 acre farm was sold for $4,500 to Wallace Waltman and John Lewis Waltman, brothers from Laddsburg, Bradford County, Pennsylvania. They immediately set to work fixing up the farm and house. At this time, the farm's name was changed from Otterdale to Cedar Lane. John Lewis Waltman returned to Pennsylvania in 1887 and another Pennsylvanian, Willie Mead, took his place at Otterdale. In 1895, John Lewis returned to Otterdale and two years after, the Waltman brothers' widowed mother, along with her new husband and two daughters, also came to live at the farm in Chesterfield. At this point there were four families living on the property. Later the Otterdale parcel was split up as Wallace Waltman and Willie Mead built their own houses on the land. In 1903, both Waltman and Mead left for Montana to settle new homesteads. John Lewis Waltman's descendants continued to live at Otterdale until January 2, 1933 when it was destroyed by a fire.

Many outbuildings were located on this farm including a separate one room kitchen, a detached office, tobacco barns, a stable, and a carriage house along with numerous other outbuildings. In the early 20th century a driveway that was lined with cedars led from Otterdale Road to the main house and in the back an alleé passed "through an arbor, vegetable garden and orchard" on its way to the family cemetery.

Otterdale burned down in 1933 and nothing remains of the property now except the abandoned cellar and a small cemetery. In the late 20th century a development was built on the property and about 12 new houses were built.
