= Woodlake, Virginia =

Woodlake
- CDP
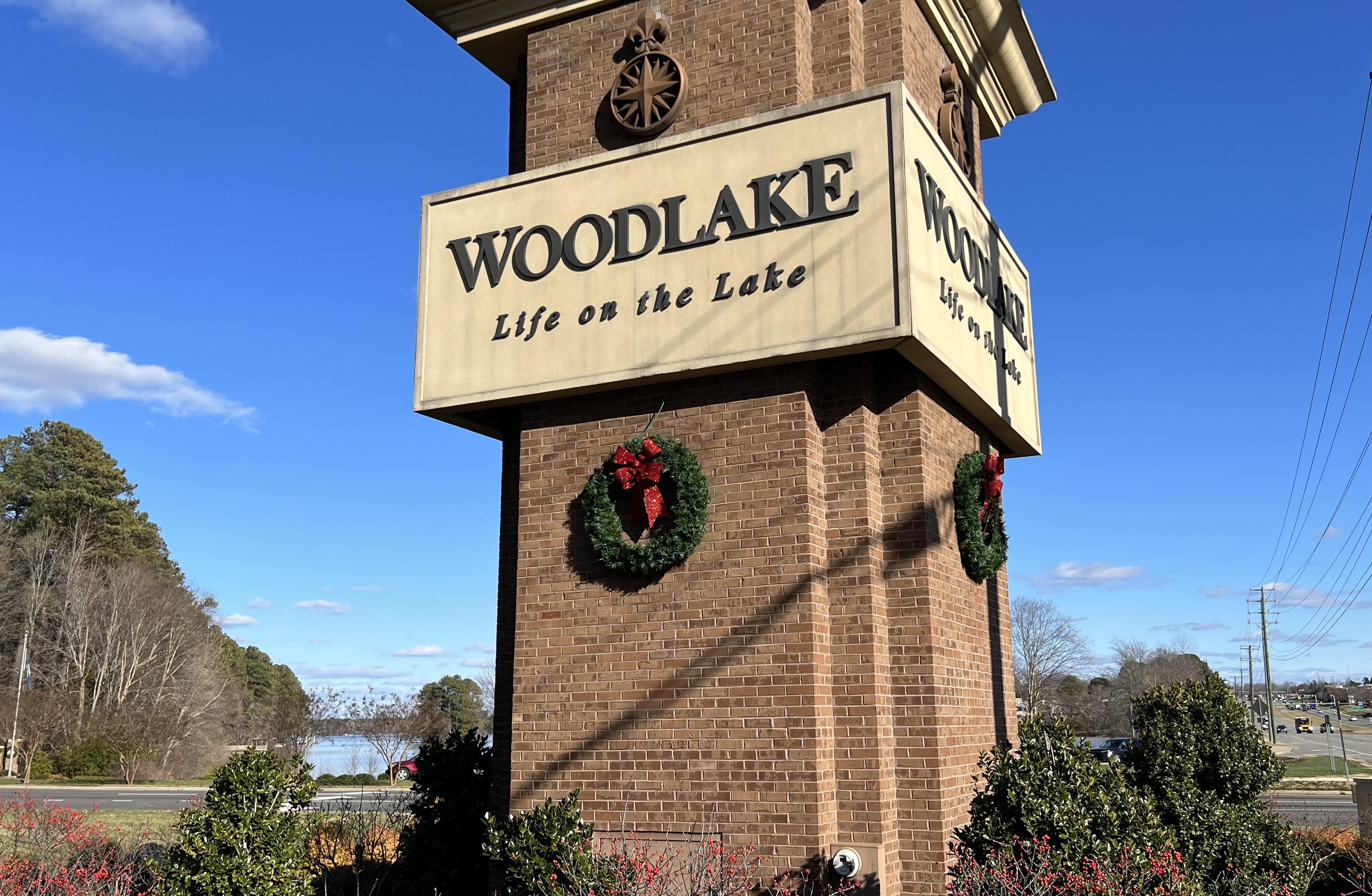
- Entrance sign for Woodlake, with the Swift Creek Reservoir behind it.

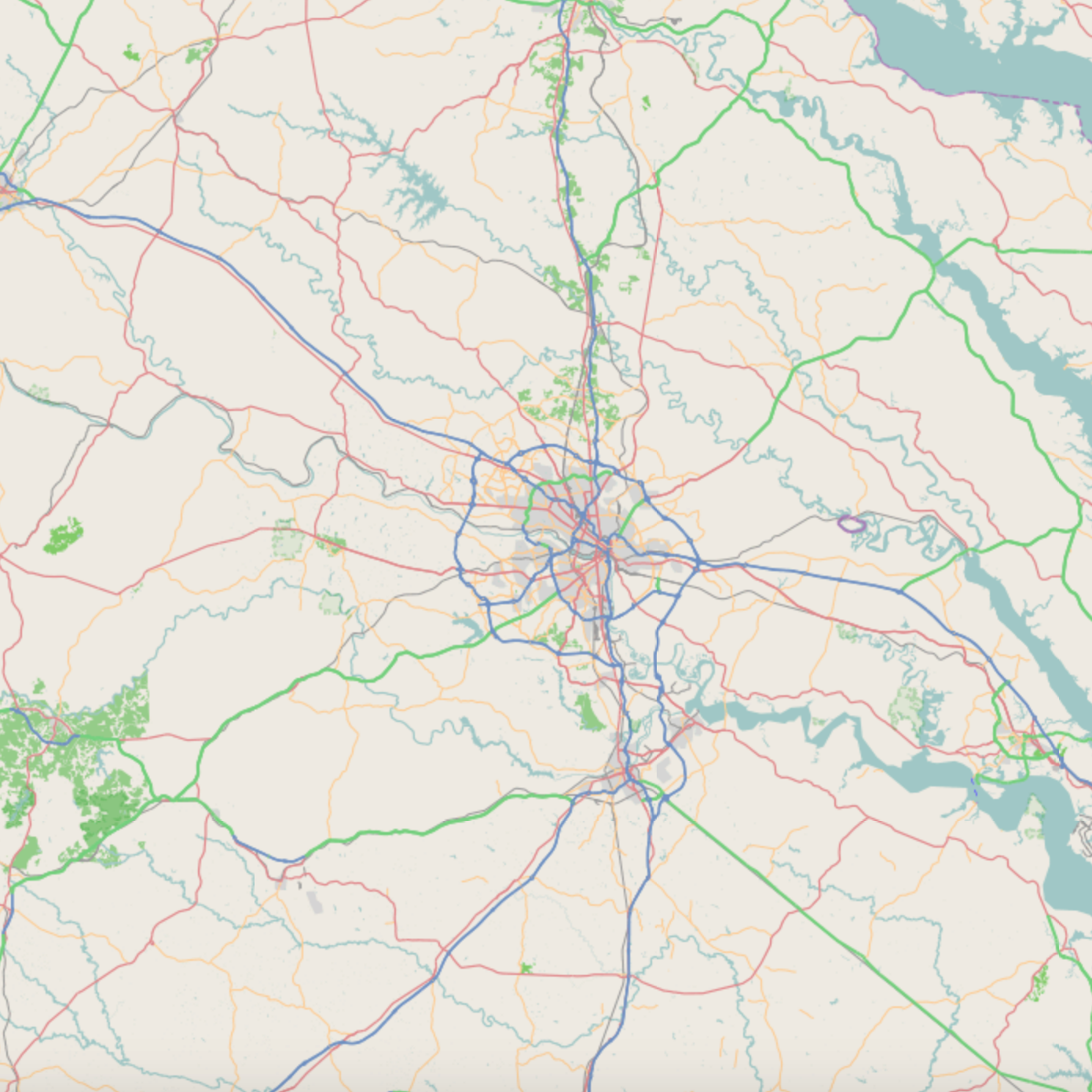
- Location within the Commonwealth of Virginia Woodlake (Virginia) Woodlake (the United States)
- Coordinates: 37°24′46″N 77°41′6″W
- Country: United States
- State: Virginia
- County: Chesterfield

Population (2020)
  - Total: 7,493
- Time zone: UTC−5 (Eastern (EST))
  - Summer (DST): UTC−4 (EDT)
- ZIP codes: 23112
- FIPS code: 51-87380
- GNIS feature ID: 2629849

Woodlake is a census-designated place in Chesterfield County, Virginia, United States. As of the 2020 census, Woodlake had a population of 7,493. The suburban community is located on the western shore of Swift Creek Reservoir.

== History ==
The real estate development company East West Partners (now East West Communities) were the developers of the Woodlake community. Planning for the community began in 1981, with construction beginning by 1984. In 1990, the community was voted “Best Community in America” by Urban Land Institute. East West Partners were also responsible for the Brandermill community, which is located on the eastern shore of the Swift Creek Reservoir.

== Demographics ==
Historical population
Census	Pop.	Note	%±
2010	7,319		—
2020	7,493		2.4%
U.S. Decennial Census; 2010 2020

Woodlake was first listed as a census designated place in the 2010 U.S. census.

=== Racial and ethnic composition ===
Woodlake CDP, Virginia – Racial and ethnic composition Note: the US Census treats Hispanic/Latino as an ethnic category. This table excludes Latinos from the racial categories and assigns them to a separate category. Hispanics/Latinos may be of any race.
Race / Ethnicity (NH = Non-Hispanic)	Pop 2010	Pop 2020	% 2010	% 2020
White alone (NH)	6,287	6,062	85.90%	80.90%
Black or African American alone (NH)	491	506	6.71%	6.75%
Native American or Alaska Native alone (NH)	12	14	0.16%	0.19%
Asian alone (NH)	168	200	2.30%	2.67%
Native Hawaiian or Pacific Islander alone (NH)	0	2	0.00%	0.03%
Other race alone (NH)	19	47	0.26%	0.63%
Mixed race or Multiracial (NH)	123	330	1.68%	4.40%
Hispanic or Latino (any race)	219	332	2.99%	4.43%
Total	7,319	7,493	100.00%	100.00%
