= Swift Creek Mill =

Historic grist mill in Virginia, US

- U.S. National Register of Historic Places
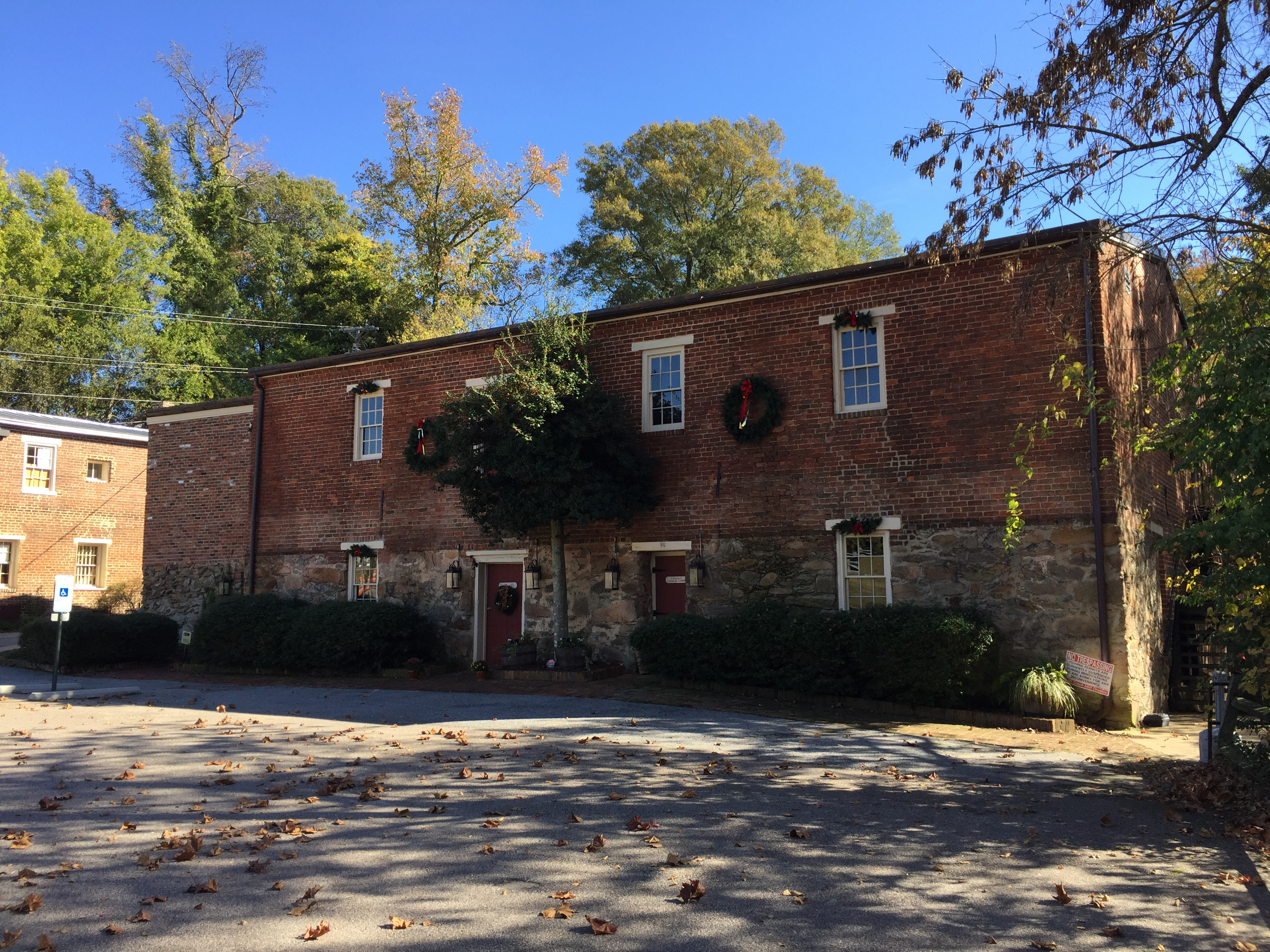

- Location within Virginia Location within the United States
- Location: U.S. Route 1, north of Colonial Heights, Virginia
- Coordinates: 37°17′0″N 77°24′42″W
- Area: 2 acres (0.81 ha)
- Built: 1850
- NRHP reference No.: 74002113
- Added to NRHP: January 11, 1974

The Swift Creek Mill is a historic gristmill at 17401 Jefferson Davis Highway in South Chesterfield, Virginia, just across Swift Creek from the city of Colonial Heights. Built about 1850, the present brick mill structure is one of a long line of mills that have occupied this site since the mid-17th century. The mill was adapted for use as the Swift Creek Mill Theater in the 1960s. It was listed on the National Register of Historic Places in 1974.

This was built in the 1600s by Henry Randolph. William and Henry Randolph came to Jamestown, then came up the James River to settle at Turkey Island around 1640. Then Henry moved to Swift Creek to build the Swift Creek Mill.

== See also ==
- National Register of Historic Places listings in Chesterfield County, Virginia
