= Fuqua Farm =

Historic house in Virginia, United States

- U.S. National Register of Historic Places
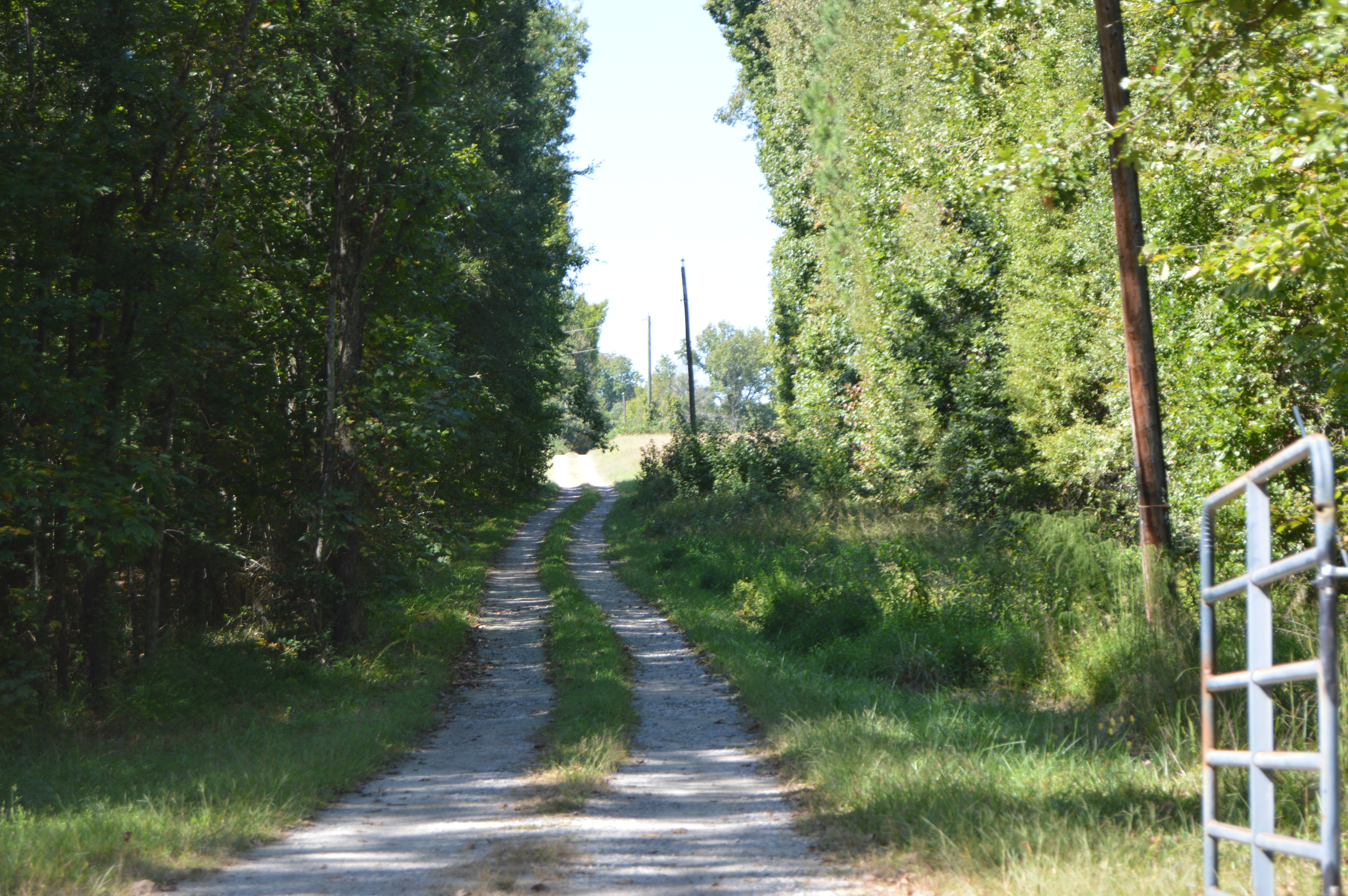
- Entrance to the property

- Location within Virginia Location within the United States
- Location: 8700 Bethia Rd., near Chesterfield, Virginia
- Coordinates: 37°23′12″N 77°40′55″W
- Area: 23 acres (9.3 ha)
- Built: c. 1785
- NRHP reference No.: 100001039; 100010721 (decrease)

Significant dates
- Added to NRHP: June 5, 2017
- Boundary decrease: August 14, 2024

Fuqua Farm is a historic farm property at 8700 Bethia Road in rural Chesterfield County, Virginia. The property, now about 23 acres (9.3 ha), was farmed by members of the Fuqua family from the 18th to the 21st century, and includes a vernacular 18th-century farmhouse. The farmhouse now includes elements of two structures that were joined about 1905; in addition to the farmhouse there are also early 20th-century outbuildings, including a chicken house, garage, and shed.

The farm was listed on the National Register of Historic Places in 2017.

== See also ==
- National Register of Historic Places listings in Chesterfield County, Virginia
