= Aetna Hill (Midlothian, Virginia house) =

Historical house in Virginia

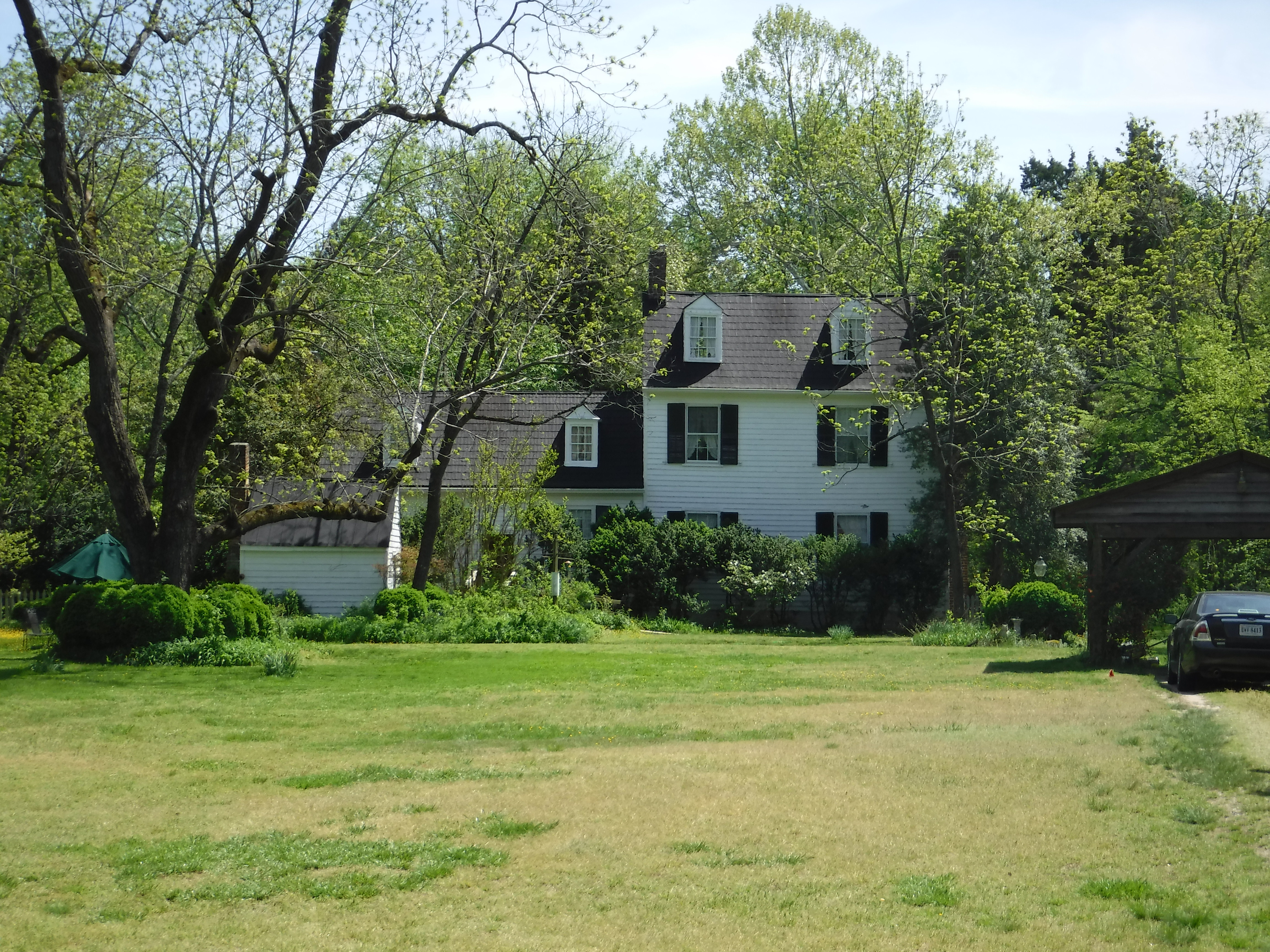
- Aetna Hill in 2019
- Interactive map of the Aetna Hill area
- Alternative names: Etna Hill
- Etymology: Aetna Mines (Mt. Aetna)

General information
- Status: Standing
- Location: Midlothian, Virginia, 1700 Salisbury Drive
- Coordinates: 37.512256°N 77.640920°W
- Elevation: 350 ft (110 m)

Aetna Hill is a house in Midlothian, Virginia. It was built soon after 1791 by Thompson Blunt, who had just married Frances Morrisette, a granddaughter of Pierre Morrisette, one of the early Huguenot settlers. This original building consisted of "a 1 1/2 story Huguenot-style structure with a three-bay facade and twin front doors".

In 1831, Thompson Blunt retired to Powhatan County and left Aetna Hill and its lands to his daughter Moriah and her husband, Elijah Brummall. A large addition was made to the house around 1840, when a 2 1/2-story, side passage house adjoining the west side of the original house was completed. In 1928, the house was in the possession of a local preacher named Robert H. Winfree. How the house came into the possession of Rev. Winfree is unclear, but it might have been inherited by his wife, Maria P. Watlington Winfree. Maria was the daughter of John O. W. Watlington and Ann Maria Brummall, who was the daughter of Elijah and Moriah.

Winfree was the pastor of nearby Jerusalem Baptist Church (later renamed Winfree Memorial Baptist Church, in honor of him and his father David B. Winfree, Jerusalem's first pastor), where he preached for more than 30 years. The Midlothian and Chesterfield County historian, Bettie Woodson Weaver, also lived here with her mother, who was Robert H. Winfree's daughter, in her early years.

After going to college and marrying Albert Weaver, Bettie returned to Aetna Hill after World War II and started renovated the building over the next three years, adding heating, electricity, and indoor plumbing to the 150-year-old house. The facade of the original 1791 house was altered when one of the front doors was taken off and replaced with a wide double window. Weaver lived at the house until very shortly before her death, writing and publishing 11 books and countless articles.

In the present day, Aetna Hill is largely untouched and the main house appears as it did in the 1840s, with slight alterations. Its lands are one of the largest sections of still standing forests in central Midlothian.
