= Tyler Johnson (baseball, born 1995) =

American baseball player (born 1995)

- Pitcher
- Born: August 21, 1995 (age 30); Midlothian, Virginia, U.S.
- Bats: Right Throws: Right

Tyler Burke Johnson (born August 21, 1995) is an American former professional baseball pitcher. He played 5 seasons in the Chicago White Sox system, but never played in the major leagues despite spending time on the team’s 40-man roster.

== Career ==
Johnson attended Trinity Episcopal School in Richmond, Virginia and played college baseball at the University of South Carolina. He was drafted by the Chicago White Sox in the fifth round of the 2017 Major League Baseball (MLB) draft.

Johnson spent his first professional season with the Great Falls Voyagers (where he earned Pioneer League All-Star honors) and Kannapolis Intimidators, pitching to a 1–1 record and a 3.86 ERA with 37 strikeouts in 25 2/3 innings in 22 relief appearances between both teams.

In 2018, he pitched with Kannapolis, with whom he was named a South Atlantic League All-Star, and the Winston-Salem Dash, going 9–0 with 14 saves and a 1.40 ERA and a 0.88 WHIP over 58 relief innings in which he struck out 89 batters with both clubs.

In 2019, he began the season with the Birmingham Barons, pitching to a 3.44 ERA and going 2–0 over 12 relief appearances in which he struck out 23 batters in 18 1/3 innings. He missed time during the season due to injury. After the season, he was selected to the United States national baseball team for the 2019 WBSC Premier 12, but he did not pitch in the tournament. Johnson did not play in a game in 2020 due to the cancellation of the minor league season because of the COVID-19 pandemic.

On November 20, 2020, Johnson was added to the 40-man roster. He made 16 appearances split between Kannapolis, Winston-Salem, and the Triple-A Charlotte Knights, but struggled to a 9.56 ERA with 22 strikeouts in 16 innings pitched. On July 29, 2021, Johnson was released by the White Sox.

On October 4, 2021, Johnson re-signed with the White Sox on a minor league contract. In 2022, Johnson pitched in 6 games for Charlotte, registering a 14.29 ERA with 6 strikeouts in 5 2/3 innings pitched. He elected free agency following the season on November 10, 2022.

On April 14, 2023, Johnson announced his retirement from professional baseball via Instagram.
