= Bellona Arsenal =

Historic site in Virginia, US

- U.S. National Register of Historic Places
- U.S. Historic district
- Virginia Landmarks Register
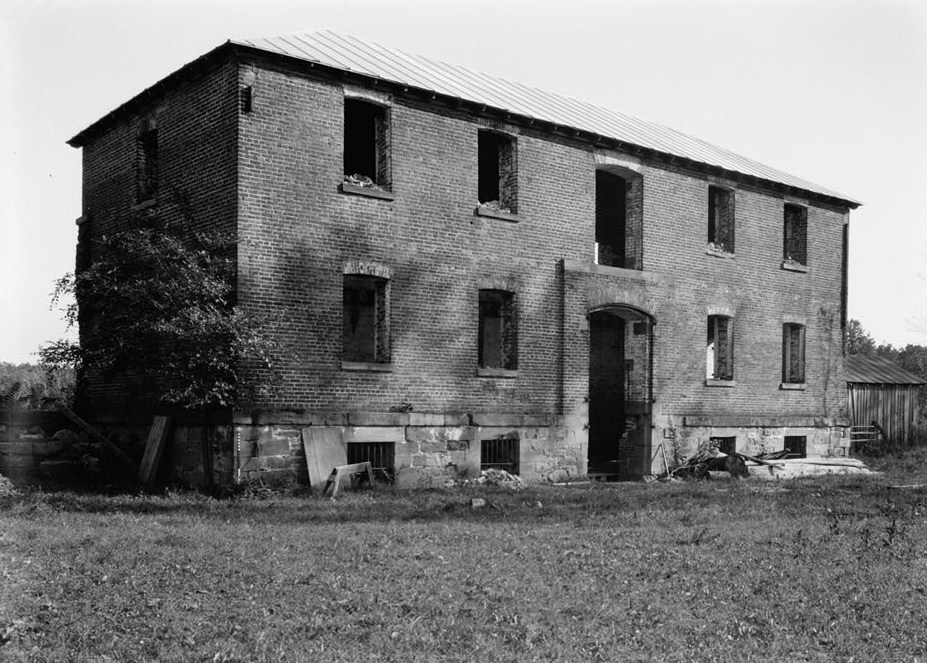
- Bellona Arsenal Workshop, HABS Photo

- Location within Virginia Location within the United States
- Location: Off VA 673, northwest of the junction with VA 147, Midlothian, Virginia
- Coordinates: 37°33′13″N 77°37′02″W
- Area: 100 acres (40 ha)
- Built: 1814
- NRHP reference No.: 71000975
- VLR No.: 020-0006

Significant dates
- Added to NRHP: May 6, 1971
- Designated VLR: January 5, 1971

Bellona Arsenal was a 19th-century United States Army post in Chesterfield County, Virginia, above the fall line of the James River west of Richmond, Virginia. Ruins of a powder magazine and other buildings are still standing. The site is listed on the National Register of Historic Places.

== History ==
U.S. attorney-general William Wirt and U.S. Army Major John Clarke established the Bellona Foundry on the south shore of the James River, 14 miles west of Richmond, Virginia, in 1810. The Foundry manufactured weaponry for the War Department. The name "Bellona" comes from the name of an ancient Roman goddess of war.

Maj. Clarke arranged for the location of a federal arsenal immediately to the west of Bellona Foundry. The Army erected Bellona Arsenal in 1816. It began storing cannon from the Foundry in 1817.

=== Antebellum years ===
Bellona Foundry supplied much ordnance to the Army and Navy of the United States throughout the antebellum period. The Arsenal repaired small arms and engaged in a few other functions until 1832; thereafter, it only received and stored cannon. The Army removed the garrison to Fort Monroe in 1833 but left a single ordnance sergeant as a caretaker.

In 1837 the War Department declared disused Bellona Arsenal surplus. Thomas Randolph and a partner leased several buildings for a silkworm farm.

Maj. Clarke died in 1844, and supervision of Bellona Foundry passed to Dr. Junius L. Archer, who leased a residence from the Arsenal complex. In 1856 Dr. Archer purchased Bellona Arsenal from the federal government for $2650.

Bellona Arsenal, nearby Tredegar Iron Works, and three facilities in other states cast heavy cannon immediately before the American Civil War.

=== American Civil War ===
Bellona Arsenal and the somewhat larger Tredegar Iron Works manufactured cannons and similar armaments for the Confederate military. Dr. Archer leased both Arsenal and Foundry to the Confederate States and retained a job as superintendent of the complex. Bellona ranked second as a producer of Confederate armaments.

=== Closure ===
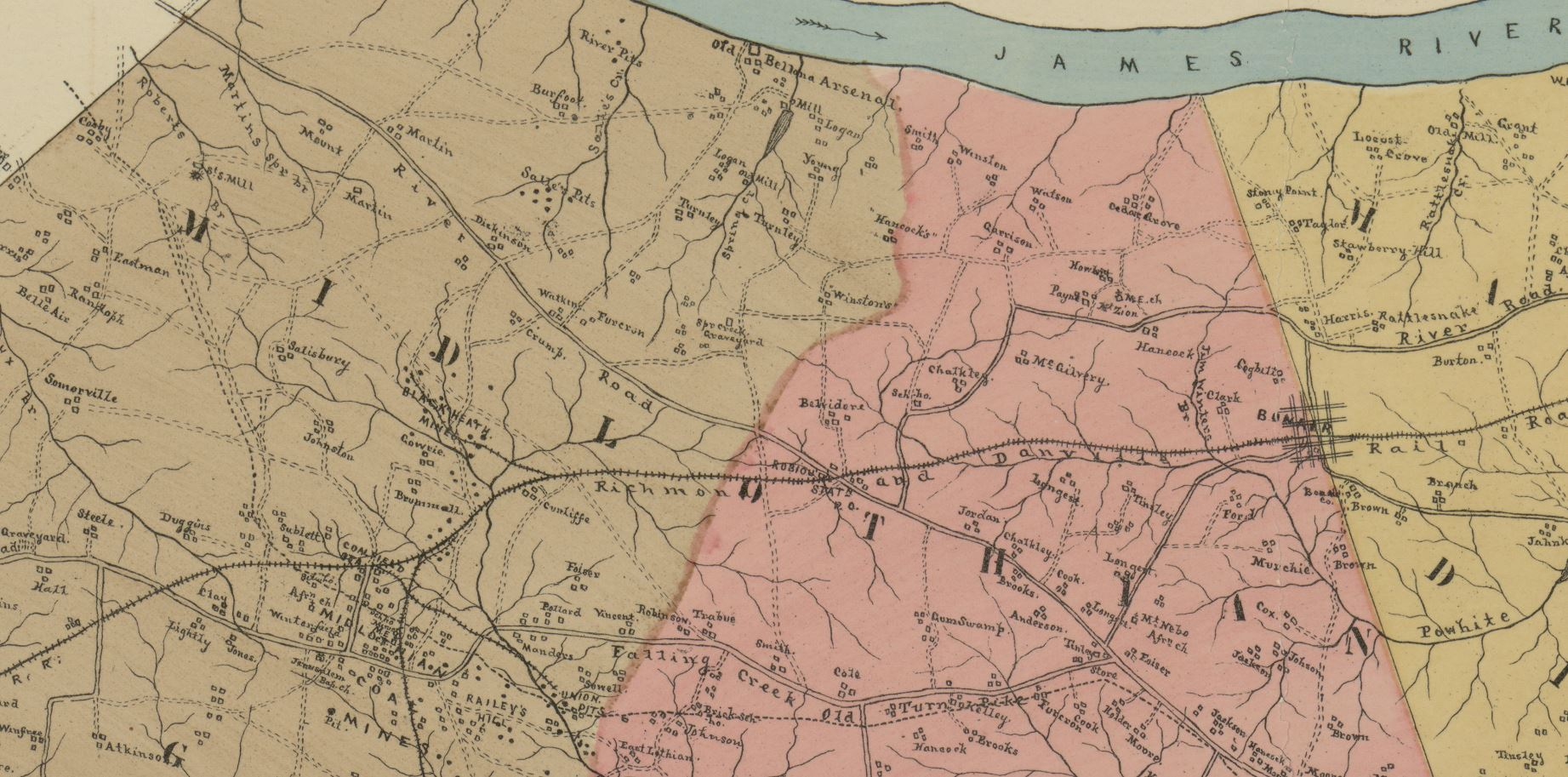
This 1888 map shows the location of the Bellona Arsenal on the Richmond and Danville rail line near Robious Station. The foundry and arsenal benefited from proximity to the Midlothian area coal mines

The owners tore down the barracks, quarters for officers, and one workshop in 1872; only three workshops of the original eight quadrangle buildings (and the powder magazine) survived at the old Bellona Arsenal. They sold the arsenal property in 1877.

The property changed hands several times; in 1942, Mr. C. Merle Luck purchased the surviving buildings and began to renovate them. He later converted them into residences.

== Physical description ==
Bellona Foundry and Bellona Arsenal consisted of several buildings built over a short time span.

Stone walls enclosed eight buildings surrounding the quadrangle at the Arsenal. These included a three-story main arsenal building at the north end with a projecting pavilion and circular third-story windows, two quarters for officers flanking the arsenal, four workshops on the east and west sides of the quadrangle, and a three-story barracks building on the south end. The similar brick workshop buildings lack foundations, and each have two stories with hipped roofs and interior end chimneys. Two smaller workshops contain three bays each with central entrances and segmental arched openings. The larger workshop building has a five-bay facade.

The low rectangular powder magazine with walls five and a half feet thick stood to the west of the quadrangle buildings. A stone wall surrounding the magazine protected the quadrangle buildings against possible explosion. The powder magazine has survived to the present but has no roof.

== Legacy ==
The arsenal and foundry are the namesake of "Old Gun Road" in the Robious area of Chesterfield County.

On 6 May 1971, Bellona Arsenal was added to the National Register of Historic Places. It is located near Midlothian, Virginia, off State Route 673 northwest of its junction with VA 147.
