= Midlothian, Virginia =

Unincorporated community in Virginia, United States

Midlothian
- Census-designated place
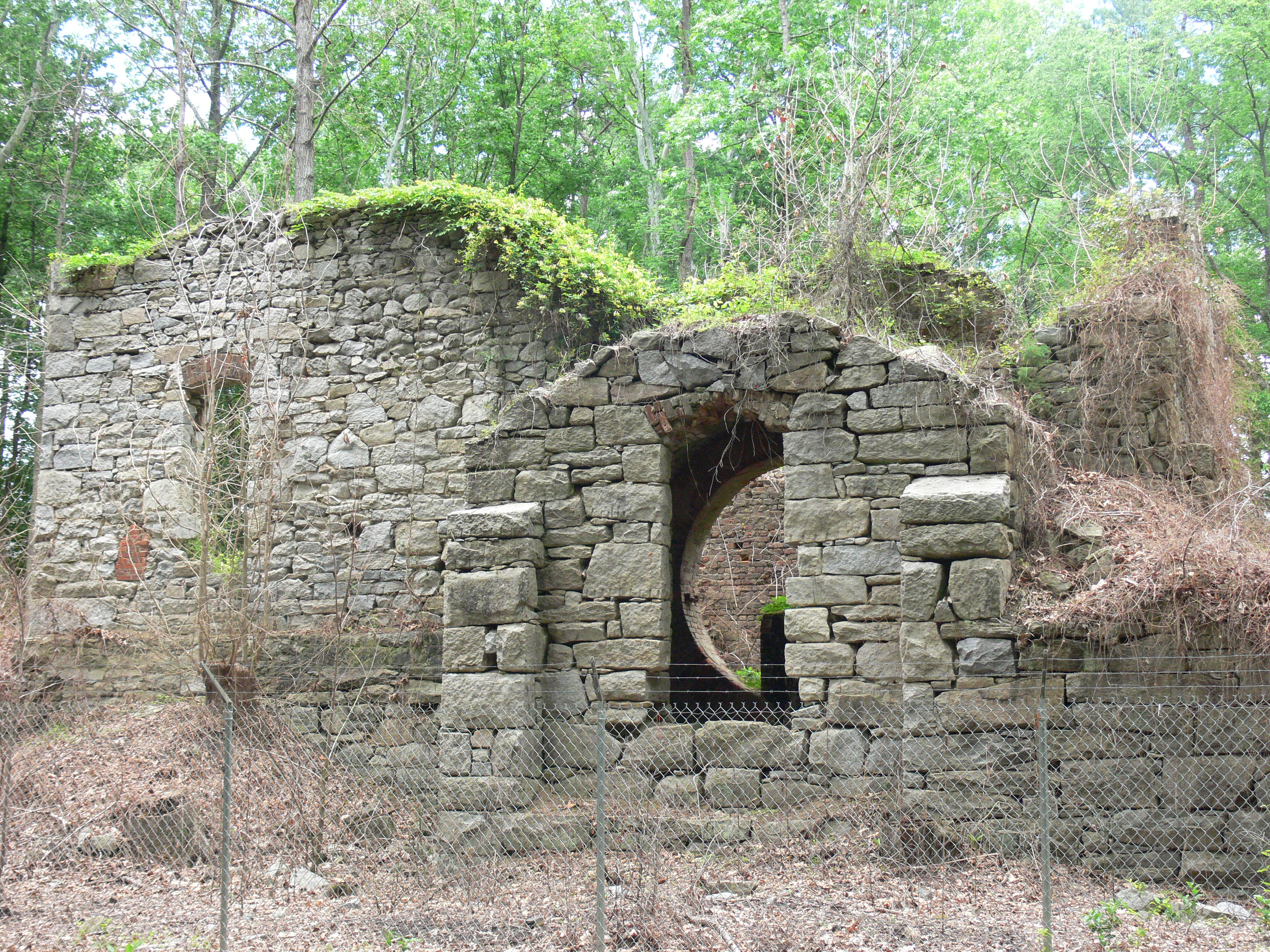
- Ruins of the Grove Shaft air-pumping station, now part of the Mid-Lothian Mines Park.

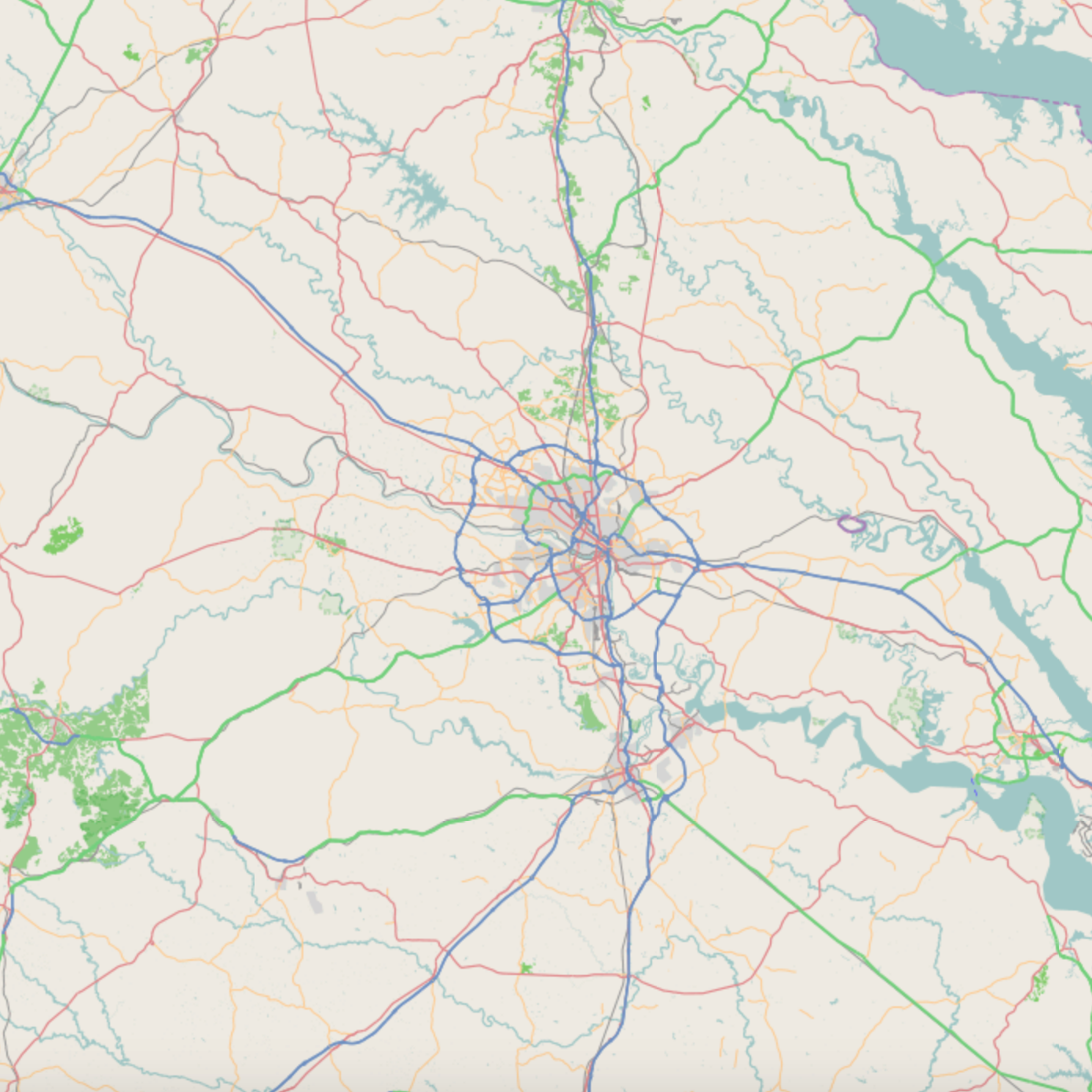
- Location of Midlothian, Virginia Midlothian (Virginia) Midlothian (the United States)
- Coordinates: 37°31′17.4″N 77°39′53.2″W
- Country: United States
- State: Virginia
- County: Chesterfield
- Settled: c.1700
- Founded: c.1730
- Founder: Wooldridge brothers
- Named for: Mid-Lothian Mining and Manufacturing Company

Government
  - District supervisor: Mark S. Miller, Ph.D.

Area
  - Total: 8.64 sq mi (22.4 km^{2})
  - Land: 8.568 sq mi (22.19 km^{2})
  - Water: 0.072 sq mi (0.19 km^{2})
- Elevation: 367 ft (112 m)

Population (2020)
  - Total: 18,320
  - Density: 2,120.4/sq mi (818.7/km^{2})
- Time zone: UTC-5:00 (EST)
  - Summer (DST): UTC-4:00 (EDT)
- ZIP code: 23112, 23113, 23114
- Area code: 804
- Website: www.midlothianva.org

Midlothian (/mɪdˈloʊθiən/ mid-LOH-thee-ən) is an unincorporated area and census-designated place in Chesterfield County, Virginia, United States. Settled as a coal town, Midlothian village experienced suburbanization effects and is now part of the western suburbs of Richmond, south of the James River in the Greater Richmond Region. Because of its unincorporated status, Midlothian has no formal government, and the name is used to represent the original small Village of Midlothian and a vast expanse of Chesterfield County in the northwestern portion of Southside Richmond served by the Midlothian post office. As of the 2020 census, Midlothian had a population of 18,320.

The Village of Midlothian was named for the early 18th-century coal mining enterprises of the Wooldridge family. Incorporated in 1836, their Mid-Lothian Mining and Manufacturing Company employed free and enslaved people to do the deadly work of digging underground. Midlothian is the site of the first commercially-mined coal in the Colony of Virginia and North America.

By the early 18th century, several mines were being developed in Chesterfield County by French Huguenots and others. The mine owners began to export the commodity from the region in the 1730s. Midlothian-area coal from Harry Heth's Black Heath mines heated the U.S. White House for President Thomas Jefferson. The transportation needs of coal shipping stimulated construction of a paved toll road (Virginia's first), the Manchester Turnpike in 1807; and the Chesterfield Railroad, Virginia's first, in 1831; each traveled the 13 miles (21 km) from the mining community to the port of Manchester, just below the Fall Line of the James River. In 1850, the Richmond and Danville Railroad built Coalfield Station, a freight and later passenger depot, near the mines.

In the 1920s, the old turnpike was straightened and became part of the new east-west U.S. Route 60. A few decades later, residential neighborhoods were developed in Southside Richmond near Midlothian, including the large Salisbury community and the Brandermill planned development sited on Swift Creek Reservoir. In the 21st century, Midlothian extends many miles beyond the original village area. State Route 288 connects the community with Interstate 64 and the State Route 76 "Powhite Parkway" toll road, and Interstate 95 in the Richmond metropolitan area's southwestern quadrant.

== Geography ==
Midlothian is located in the Piedmont geologic region of the state, and is made up of mainly a hilled, fertile land (it is somewhat of a plain). It is located on the Richmond Basin, which is one of the Eastern North America Rift Basins. It contains some sedimentary rock and bituminous coal.

=== Watersheds ===
The Midlothian area serves as the headwaters to a number of creeks which ultimately contribute their waters to the flow of the James River. These include Swift Creek and Falling Creek. The Swift Creek Reservoir serves as the major source of fresh water for the county.

== Demographics ==
Historical population
Census	Pop.	Note	%±
2020	18,320		—
U.S. Decennial Census; 2010 2020

Midlothian first appeared as a census-designated place in the 2020 U.S. census.

=== Racial and ethnic composition ===
Midlothian CDP, Virginia – Racial and ethnic composition Note: the US Census treats Hispanic/Latino as an ethnic category. This table excludes Latinos from the racial categories and assigns them to a separate category. Hispanics/Latinos may be of any race.
Race / Ethnicity (NH = Non-Hispanic)	Pop 2020	2020
White alone (NH)	13,880	75.76%
Black or African American alone (NH)	1,488	8.12%
Native American or Alaska Native alone (NH)	28	0.15%
Asian alone (NH)	1,257	6.86%
Native Hawaiian or Pacific Islander alone (NH)	10	0.05%
Other race alone (NH)	88	0.48%
Mixed race or Multiracial (NH)	771	4.21%
Hispanic or Latino (any race)	798	4.36%
Total	18,320	100.00%

=== 2020 census ===
As of the 2020 census, Midlothian had a population of 18,320. The median age was 41.8 years. 24.1% of residents were under the age of 18 and 18.8% of residents were 65 years of age or older. For every 100 females there were 88.5 males, and for every 100 females age 18 and over there were 84.3 males age 18 and over.

100.0% of residents lived in urban areas, while 0.0% lived in rural areas.

There were 7,196 households in Midlothian, of which 34.5% had children under the age of 18 living in them. Of all households, 55.3% were married-couple households, 12.5% were households with a male householder and no spouse or partner present, and 28.0% were households with a female householder and no spouse or partner present. About 25.9% of all households were made up of individuals and 12.8% had someone living alone who was 65 years of age or older.

There were 7,583 housing units, of which 5.1% were vacant. The homeowner vacancy rate was 0.6% and the rental vacancy rate was 12.5%.

Racial composition as of the 2020 census
Race	Number	Percent
White	14,060	76.7%
Black or African American	1,536	8.4%
American Indian and Alaska Native	43	0.2%
Asian	1,259	6.9%
Native Hawaiian and Other Pacific Islander	12	0.1%
Some other race	234	1.3%
Two or more races	1,176	6.4%

=== 2019 income ===
In 2019, the median household income was $89,851.

== Economy ==
Midlothian was ranked #37 in CNNMoney's list of "The Best Places to Live" in 2005 and #99 in 2008.

At the turn of the 21st century, a group of area business professionals formed an independent organization called the Western Chesterfield Business Alliance, which in 2013 was renamed the Midlothian Business Alliance.

== Government ==
Midlothian is an unincorporated area of Chesterfield County. The area is represented by an elected district supervisor on the county's board of supervisors. The position has been held by Mark S. Miller, Ph.D. since 2022.

== Infrastructure ==
In 2004, completion of State Route 288 connected Midlothian to the circumferential highway network of greater Richmond Region. Development was controversial, and some residents wanted to avoid the scale seen in Northern Virginia. After years of discussion, in March 2006 Chesterfield County approved intensive zoning for the Watkins Centre, promoted as a large, mixed-use office complex and retail "lifestyle center" at the intersection of Route 288 and U.S. 60, 2 miles (3.2 km) west of the Village of Midlothian.

With the addition of the multimillion-dollar Bon Secours Hospital, St. Francis, Midlothian has a major hospital within five minutes of Midlothian's highest concentration of residents.

James River High School, part of Chesterfield County Public Schools located in Midlothian, was named a National Blue Ribbon School in 2000. In 2015, Cosby High School, also located in Midlothian, received this recognition. In 2019, Midlothian High School received the award.

== History ==
=== Etymology ===
The origins of the name of Midlothian are subject to debate.

A prevalent story is that the name came from two brothers from East Lothian and West Lothian in Scotland who founded a village. For the name of the village they decided to name it after their respective homelands and a compromise was made, thus making the name of Midlothian.

This local legend is based in some truth. The two brothers who were said to have founded the village were likely Abraham Salle and Dr. Archibald Logwood Wooldridge (often called A. S. and A. L. Wooldridge). They, along with their two sisters, Jane Elam and Charlotte Wooldridge, incorporated a mining company called the Midlothian Coal Mining Company in 1835. This company's lands consisted of most of the present-day land south of Midlothian Turnpike in the village of Midlothian and is thought to have given its name to the village. The name of the coal company came from the Midlothian tract of land that was one of the two tracts that made up the company's original land holdings of 404 1/2 acres. The name of the tract came from a house that was located there and was owned by the Wooldridge family. The first Wooldridge in America, and the one who had assembled most of the Midlothian area lands, John Wooldridge came in the late 17th century from England. However, his ancestors in England had connections with the region of Midlothian in Scotland, and it is from here that the name is originally derived.

The village had not always been called Midlothian. In the late 1700s, the area was listed on maps simply as "Coal Mines" and later came to be known as Coalfield. The modern-day Coalfield Road is a remnant of this name. The station where the Richmond and Danville railroads cut through the village was called Coalfield Station. It was first built in 1850 later to be destroyed in 1864 during the Civil War. The second Coalfield Station was built two years later in 1866 to be finally demolished in 1957. The station stood at the intersection of Salisbury Drive and the railroad. The US Post Office established at the station had the name of Midlothian. This reflected the importance of the Midlothian Coal Mining Company. By the late 1800s, the area had ceased to be called Coalfield and was referred to as Midlothian.

=== Early history ===
Before the arrival of Europeans in the 17th century, the area had been populated for thousands of years by various cultures of Native Americans. Among these in historic times were the Siouan-speaking Monacan tribe. They often came into conflict with the Algonquian-speaking members of the Powhatan Confederacy, who were generally located to the east in the Virginia Tidewater area.

In 1700 and after, French Huguenot settlers, who were Protestant, came to the area in the Virginia Colony to escape Catholic religious persecution in France. Most came from London, where they had resettled as refugees. Although the Crown had offered the French land in Lower Norfolk County, the governor of the colony and William Byrd offered them the village of Manakin Town, which had been abandoned by the Monacan. Byrd and the governor intended to use the French as a buffer settlement, and thought they would be easier to control apart from the English. The location was about 20 miles (32 km) above the head of navigation on the James River at what became Richmond. The French, many of whom were artisans and merchants, struggled to survive on the isolated frontier. The terrain was hilly and largely wooded, and shipping of farm products such as tobacco crops was not easy.

The greater natural resource in the Midlothian area was coal, and the area was ultimately developed with coal mining and railroads. About 10 miles (16 km) west of the fall line of the James River at present-day Richmond is a basin of coal, which was one of the earliest mined in the Virginia Colony. Scots settlers with mining skills began to mine this resource in the 18th century. Many coal-related enterprises in the Midlothian area of Chesterfield County began early in the 18th century.

In 1846, Chesterfield County's first Black church, First Baptist Church of Midlothian, was founded. It was rebuilt in 1877 after a fire, and the reconstruction included a small one-room building to be the first public school for Black children in the area.

=== Coal mining ===
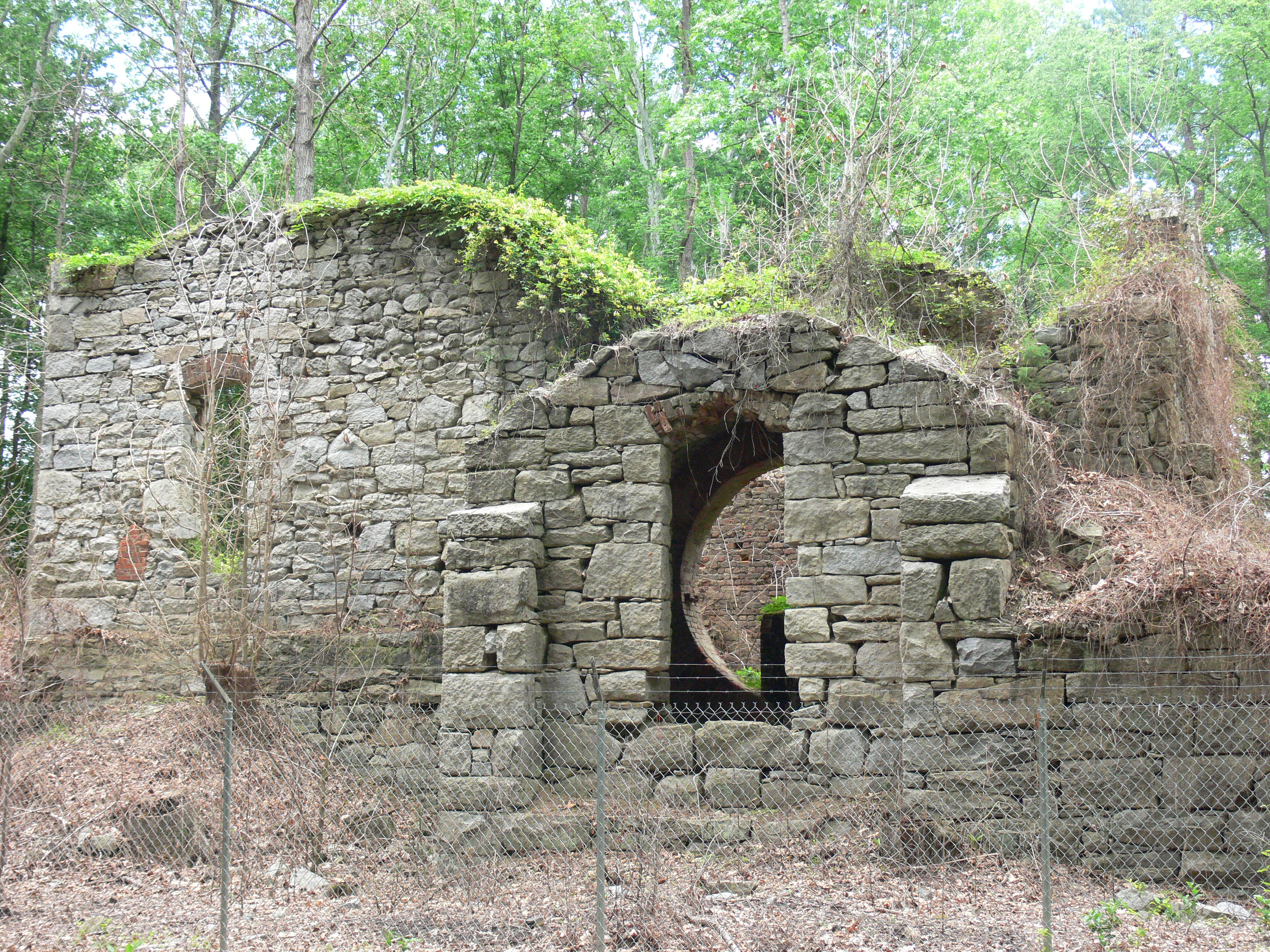
Grove Shaft

The Village area of today's Midlothian started as a settlement of coal miners in the 18th century which were among the oldest mining shafts in the United States. In 1709, Midlothian produced the first commercially mined coal in the United States. Among other participants in the area's emerging coal business was Colonel Henry "Harry" Heth, a businessman who emigrated from England about 1759. He established offices at Norfolk and Manchester, where several generations of his family were also involved in the business.

During the American Revolution, coal produced in the Midlothian coal pits supplied the cannon factory on the James River at Westham, upstream from Richmond; it produced shot and shells for the Continental Army. By the end of the War, developers shipped Chesterfield coal to Philadelphia, New York, Boston and to every city in Virginia. Commenting on the area's coal in his Notes on the State of Virginia (1781–82), then-Governor Thomas Jefferson stated: "The country on James river, from 15 to 20 miles above Richmond, and for several miles northward and southward, is replete with mineral coal of a very excellent quality." During his presidency, Jefferson ordered coal from the Black Heath Mine in Midlothian for use in the White House.

In 1989 the Chesterfield County Board of Supervisors approved a special area plan for Midlothian Mines Park, partly as a response to economic growth along Midlothian Turnpike resulting in population explosion. The core of the new "Special Area Plan" was based on the boundary of the plan of 1989 and extended westward to Route 288 as a natural boundary, and a map of the Midlothian community special area plan boundary was provided by John G. Ownby for the Richmond Times-Dispatch. Midlothian Mines Park, on the site of the first commercially-mined coal deposits in the Colony of Virginia, first opened for visitors in 2004. The Special Area Plan was updated in 2019.

=== Early roads, first turnpike, and railroads ===
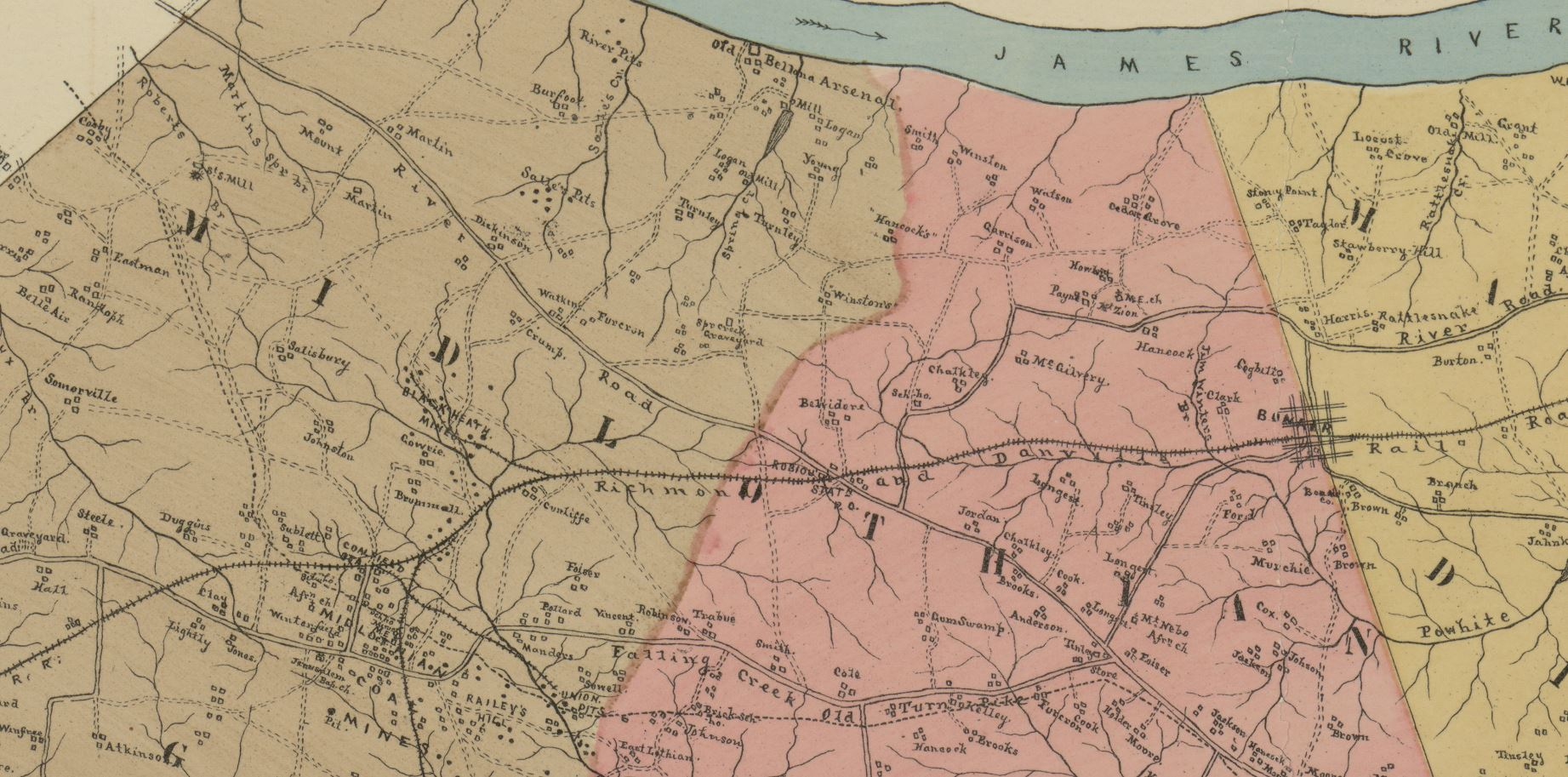
While the Chesterfield Railroad was founded to move coal to Richmond 13 miles (21 km) to the East, the Richmond and Danville railroad replaced it in the 1850s.

In 1802, a petition to form the Manchester Turnpike Company was created by mine owners and investors. They wanted the construction of a macadam toll road at least 30 feet wide from Manchester to Falling Creek bridge. The toll road, Manchester and Falling Creek Turnpike, was built in 1804 to ease traffic on what is now Old Buckingham Road. Farm and passenger wagons were allowed to only pay the toll one-way, however coal wagons were to pay half toll on return due to the wear the heavy wagons would create on the road. It was graveled in 1807, making it Virginia's first hard-surfaced road. The road's descendant is known today as Midlothian Turnpike.

By 1824, an estimated 70 to 100 wagons, each of which was loaded with four or five tons of coal, made a daily trip on the turnpike, transporting to the docks near Manchester the million or more bushels (30,000 metric tons) of coal that were produced in Chesterfield County each year. The heavily loaded coal wagons tended to cut deep ruts in the turnpike, raising clouds of dust in summer and churning the road into mud in the rainy season. As there were few options for shunpiking, citizens whose faster buggies dawdled along behind the lumbering wagons urged the state legislature to do something about it—a canal, a better road, but something.

The result was the Chesterfield Railroad, a 13 miles (21 km) mule- and gravity-powered line that connected the Midlothian coal mines with wharves located at Manchester, directly across from Richmond. Partially funded by the Virginia Board of Public Works, the railroad began operating in 1831, the first in the state. By 1852, the newer, steam-driven Richmond and Danville Railroad (R&D) began operation to Coalfield Station, later renamed Midlothian; it quickly supplanted the slower Chesterfield Railroad. In a financial reorganization in 1894, the R&D line through Midlothian became part of the Southern Railway system. It is now part of Norfolk Southern Railway. The R&D railroad depot was burned during the Civil War by Union Brigadier General August V. Kautz but was later rebuilt after the war in 1866. It was renovated in 1917 to accommodate higher demand and demolished in 1957 following the cease of Southern Railway passenger service. The depot was located at the northwest corner of the railroad and what is known today as Salisbury Drive. According to the 1895 Virginia atlas, the population of Midlothian was 375.

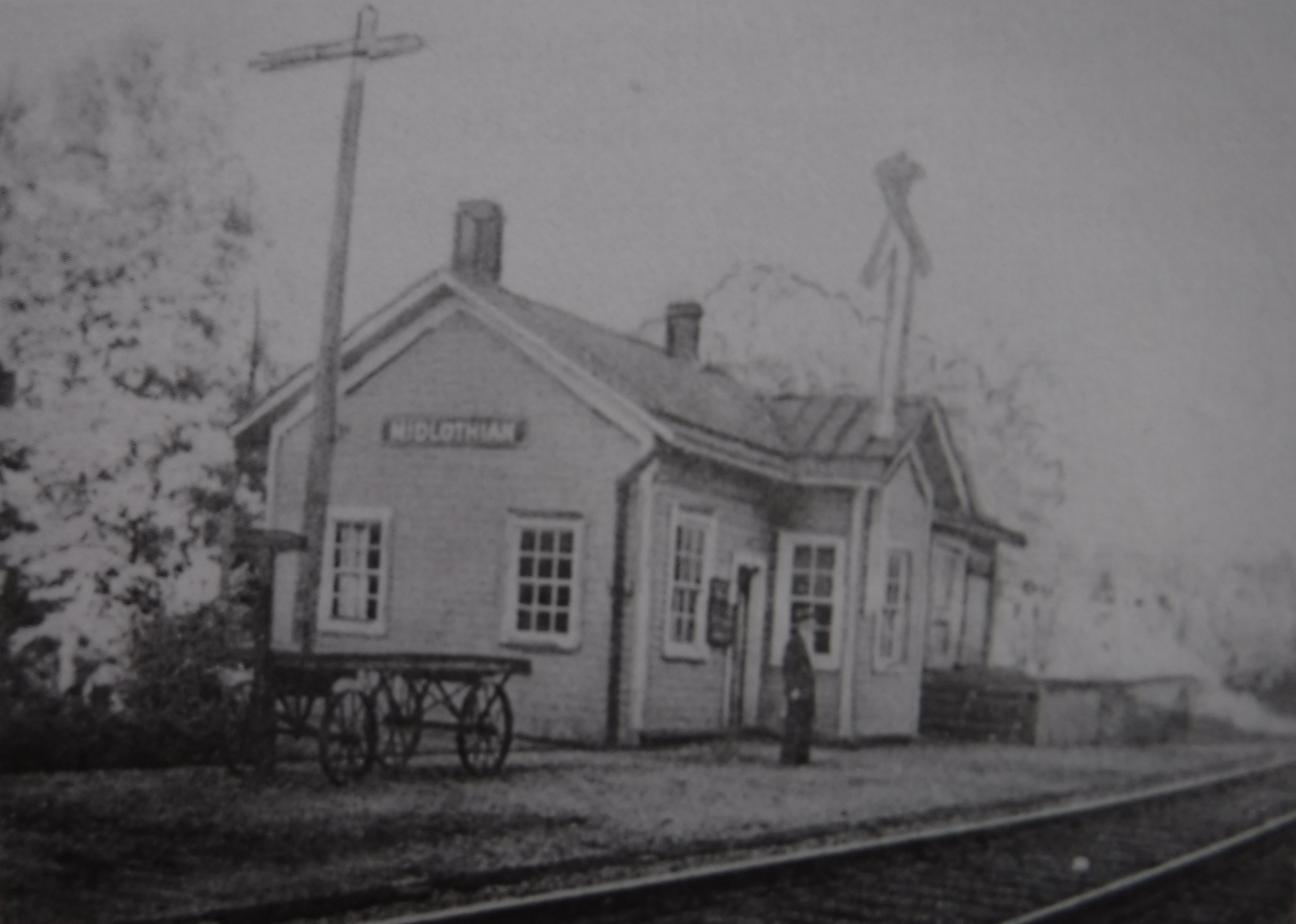
Midlothian train station (c. 1940s)

=== 20th century: village becomes surrounded by suburban development ===
In the 20th century, coal mining declined. The area became less populated, remaining largely wooded with farms scattered along mostly rural and dirt roads. Gradually, post-war construction of the highway network and the growth of metropolitan Richmond brought subdivision residential development. When the Swift Creek Reservoir was created in 1965, the availability of water and sewer service accelerated residential growth, with Brandermill built in 1975.

In 1988, an extension of the Powhite Parkway and widening of Midlothian Turnpike and Hull Street Road (U.S. Route 360) provided much-needed highway infrastructure. The area continued to attract new residents as farm and forest lands were redeveloped into residential subdivisions. The expansion of the area assigned to the Midlothian post office caused a much larger area to be assigned to have a "Midlothian" ZIP code on their address. As a result, many address locations within Chesterfield County that are far away from the original Midlothian village on U.S. Route 60 have "Midlothian" as their preferred place name. Chesterfield County's Midlothian Community Special Area Plan defines the Midlothian community as roughly the area between the Village of Midlothian and Lucks Lane to the south.

=== Historic landmarks ===
Chesterfield County Historic Landmarks near the Midlothian Village include:

- Bellona Arsenal
- Bethel Baptist Church
- Bellgrade Plantation, 11500 West Huguenot Road
- Dinwiddie County Pullman Car
- Trabue's Tavern, 11940 Old Buckingham Road
- Hallsboro Store
- Hallsborough Tavern, 16300 Midlothian Turnpike
- Ivymont Manor, 14111 Midlothian Turnpike (built in 1850)
- Southside Speedway, 12800 Genito Road
- Chesterfield Railroad, portion of roadbed (visible off Sturbridge Drive south of Midlothian Turnpike behind Pocono Green Shopping Center)

=== Chesterfield Museum ===
An exhibit on local mining history in the Chesterfield Museum includes a length of iron rail from the incline railway, the first in Virginia.

== Notable people ==
- DaShaun Amos, professional football player
- Leslie D. Carter, U.S. Army major general
- Francis X. DiLorenzo, Catholic bishop
- Connelly Early, professional baseball player
- Tori Hall, pageant and reality TV contestant
- Jason Holman, professional football player and coach
- Aimee Mann, musician
- Jesse Jefferson, former pitcher for the Toronto Blue Jays
- Edward Johnson, Confederate States Army major general
- Tyler Johnson, professional baseball player
- Richard Kelly, filmmaker
- Savannah Lane, Miss Virginia 2015
- Jake Lowery, professional baseball coach and manager
- Alex McMurtry, gymnast
- Luis Rendon, college soccer player
- Drew Romig, professional soccer player
- Nicholas Simmonds, professional soccer player who represented the Jamaica national team
- Shannon Taylor, Olympic field hockey player and college coach

== In popular culture ==
Midlothian is the inspiration for the fictional town of Middlesex, Virginia in the cult film Donnie Darko. "It’s meant to be a stylized, satirical, comic book, fantasyland version of what I remember Midlothian, Virginia to be, I guess," filmmaker Richard Kelly has explained.

== See also ==
- Aetna Hill (Midlothian, Virginia house)
