= Swift Creek (Virginia) =

River in Virginia, United States

Coordinates: 37.29848°N 77.36859°W

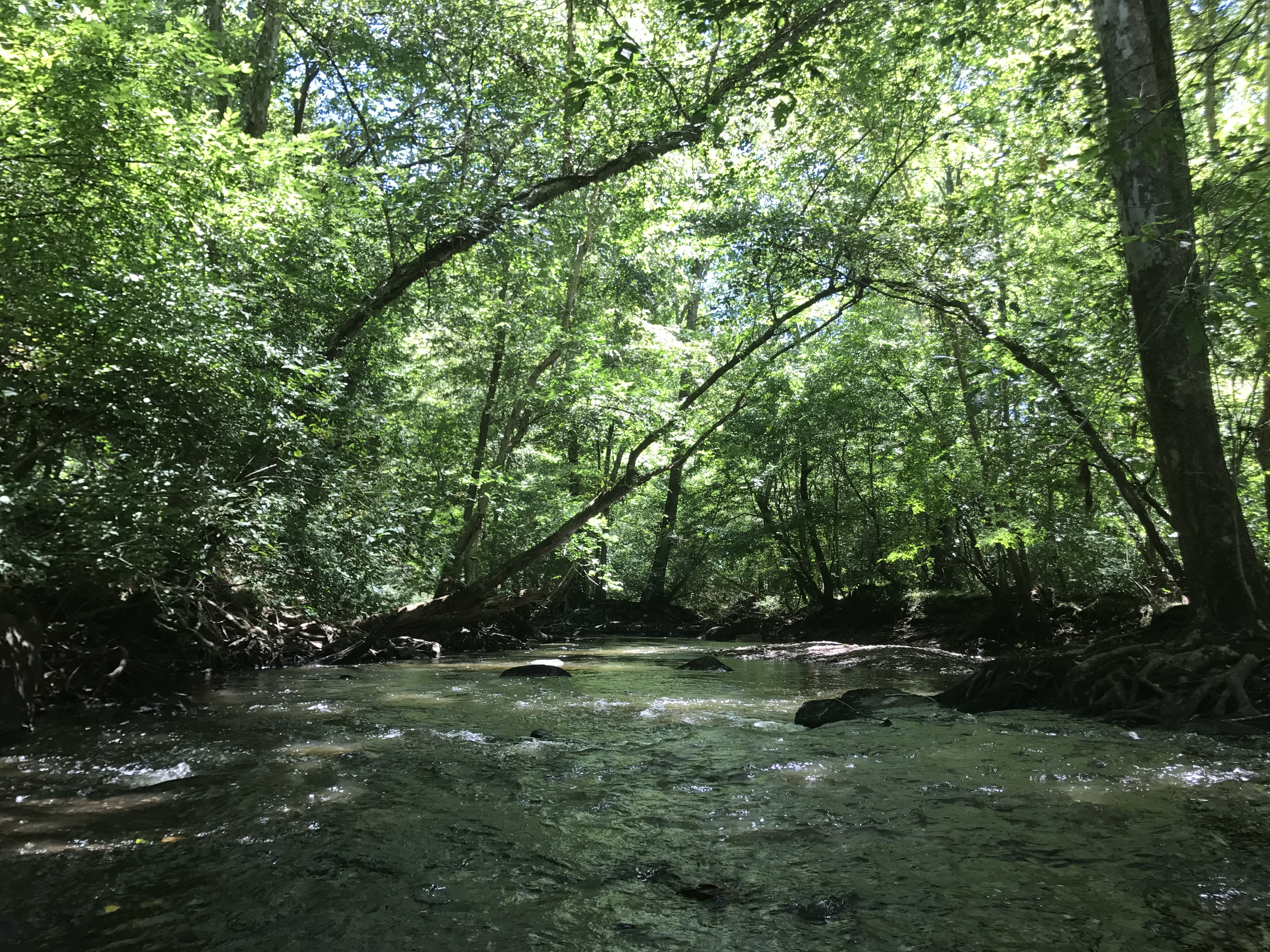
- Swift Creek at Pocahontas State Park, below Swift Creek Dam.

Location
- Country: United States

Physical characteristics
- Source
  - location: Powhatan County, Virginia
- Mouth
  - location: Colonial Heights
- Length: 44.9 miles (72.3 km)

Basin features
- Cities: Powhatan County, Chesterfield County, Colonial Heights

Swift Creek is a 44.9-mile-long (72.3 km) river in the U.S. state of Virginia. It rises west of Richmond in Powhatan County near U.S. Route 60 and travels southeast through Powhatan County and into Chesterfield County southwest of Hallsboro. Swift Creek flows to the north side of the Swift Creek Reservoir. After a series of twists and turns it courses into Pocahontas State Park, where it then forms Swift Creek Lake. After flowing out of Pocahontas State Park and into southeastern Chesterfield County, it eventually forms the northern boundary of Colonial Heights, where it joins the Appomattox River.

== See also ==
- List of rivers of Virginia
