= Trabue's Tavern (Midlothian, Virginia) =

Historic house in Virginia, United States

- Trabue's Tavern (Pleasant View)
- U.S. National Register of Historic Places
- Virginia Landmarks Register
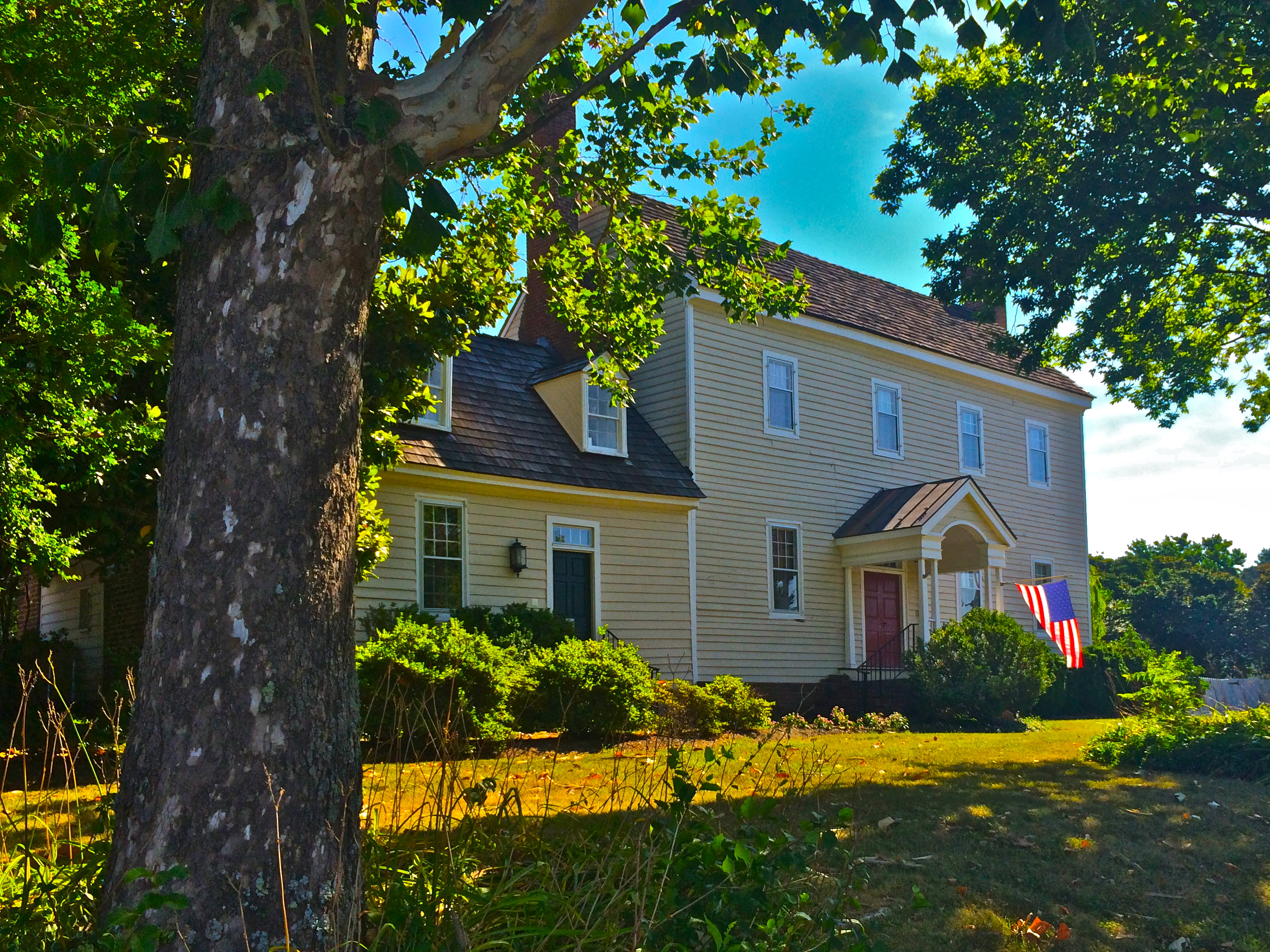

- Location within Virginia Location within the United States
- Location: 1.5 miles (2.4 km) east of Midlothian on VA 677, near Midlothian, Virginia
- Coordinates: 37°30′42″N 77°37′18″W
- Area: 4 acres (1.6 ha)
- Built: c. 1730
- NRHP reference No.: 75002018
- VLR No.: 020-0055

Significant dates
- Added to NRHP: June 10, 1975
- Designated VLR: February 18, 1975

Trabue's Tavern, also known as Pleasant View, is a historic plantation house and former tavern located near Midlothian, Chesterfield County, Virginia. The original section was built about 1730, and consists of two parts—an early 1 1/2-story western wing with a lean-to and a later two-story eastern wing with a one-story rear lean-to. Both sections are frame structures with gable roofs. Also on the property are several contributing buildings: an outhouse, well house, dairy, smokehouse, two kitchen buildings, schoolhouse, and family cemetery. Macon Trabue installed a wrought iron fence around the cemetery in the mid-nineteenth century.

The property was owned by the Trabue family, an ethnic French Huguenot family who were among the principal mine-owners in the town. They used the house as an inn patronized by travelers and miners alike. It formerly had a front porch which was eventually removed after the house was sold out of the family in 1956.

The estate was listed on the National Register of Historic Places in 1975.

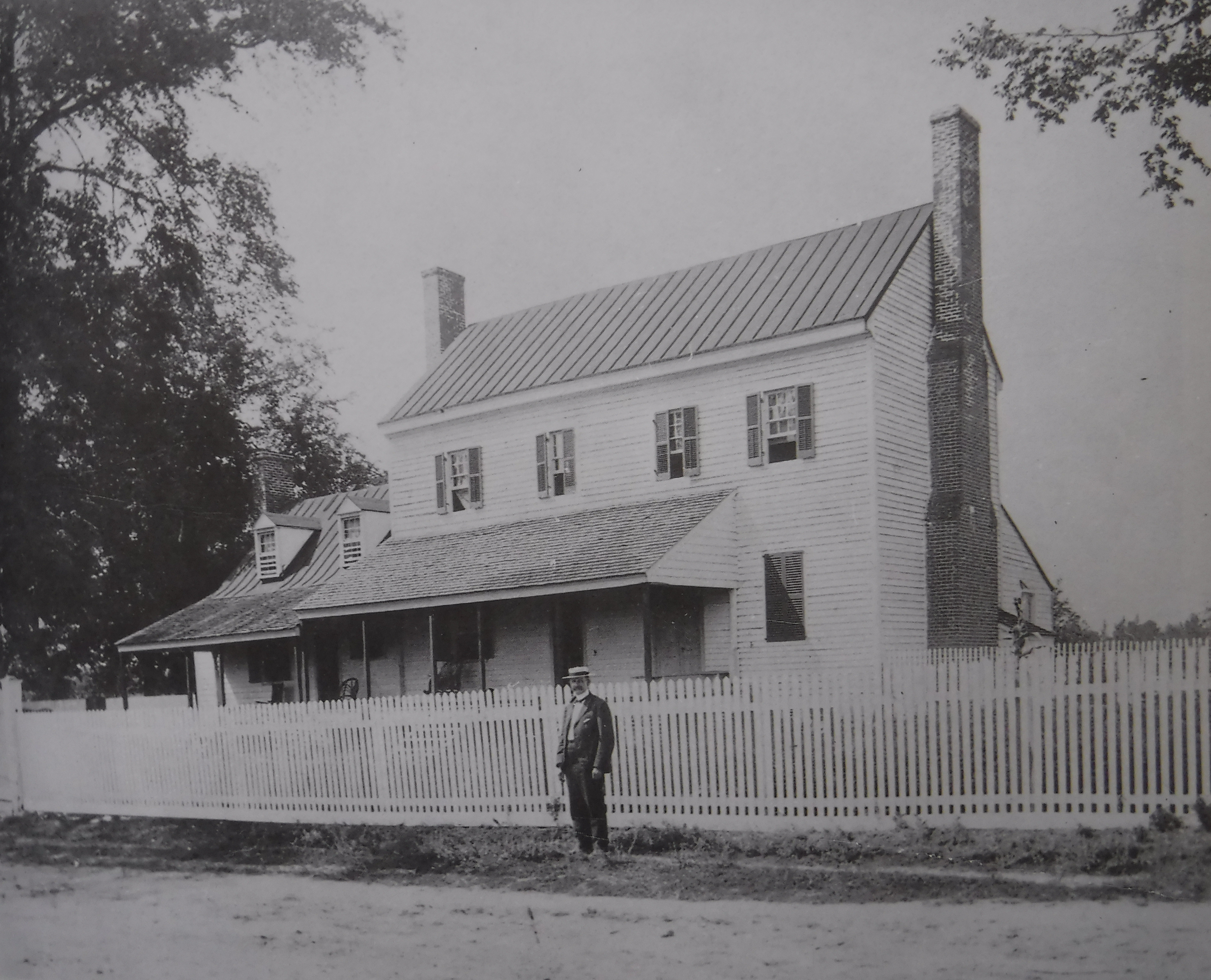
Trabue's Tavern around 1900
