= Chester Presbyterian Church =

Historic church in Virginia, United States

- Wyatt Chapel at Chester Presbyterian Church
- U.S. National Register of Historic Places
- Virginia Landmarks Register
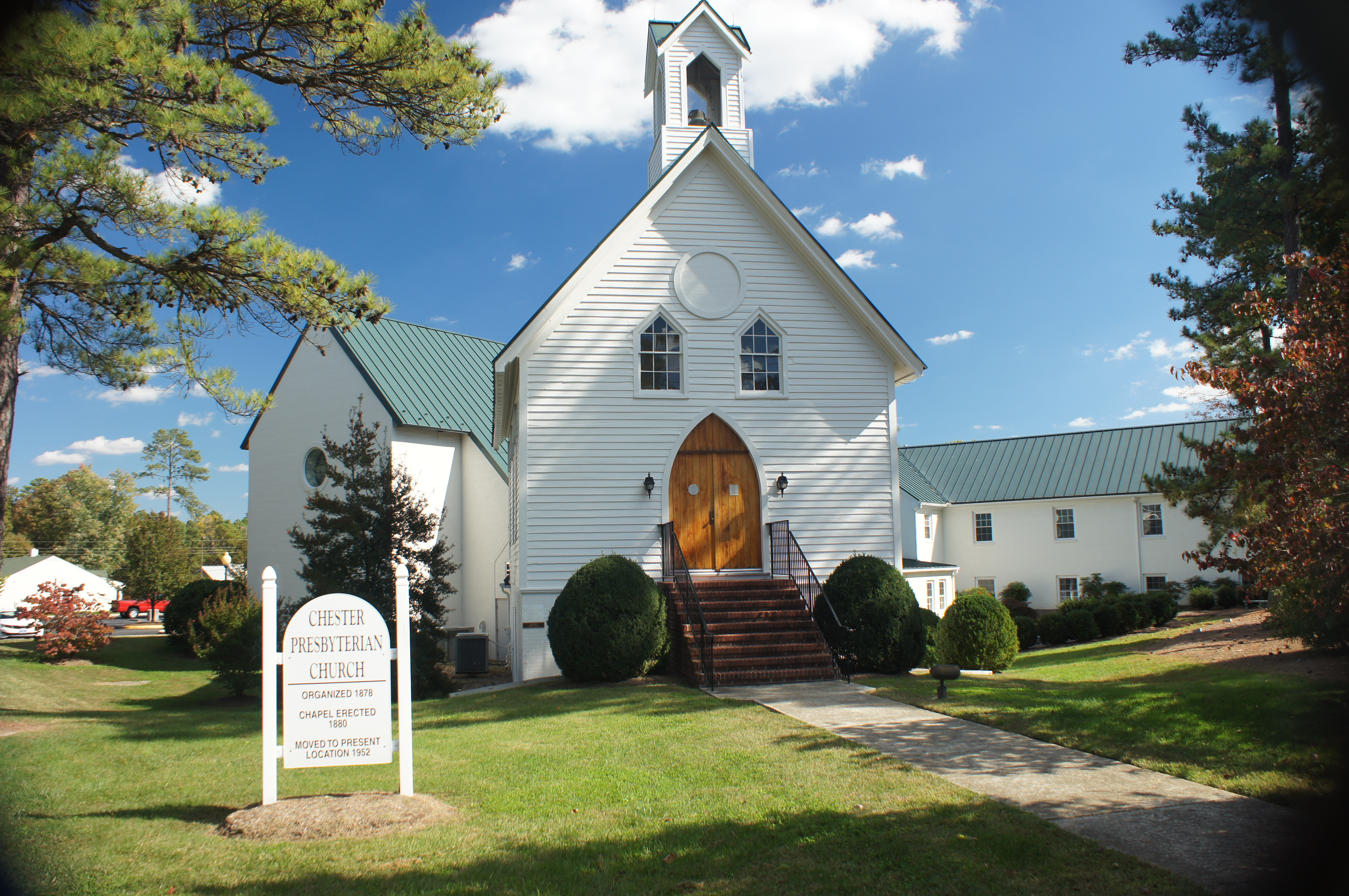

- Location within Virginia Location within the United States
- Location: Jct. of Osborne Rd. and VA 10, Chester, Virginia
- Coordinates: 37°21′33″N 77°25′53″W
- Area: 1 acre (0.40 ha)
- Built: 1880
- Architect: Grove, T. Martin
- Architectural style: Gothic Revival
- NRHP reference No.: 76002098
- VLR No.: 020-5088

Significant dates
- Added to NRHP: November 21, 1976
- Designated VLR: June 15, 1976

Wyatt Chapel at Chester Presbyterian Church is a historic Presbyterian church located at the junction of Osborne Road and VA 10 in Chester, Chesterfield County, Virginia. The chapel is a wood-frame structure measuring 20 by 30 feet and is covered by a steeply pitched gable roof with relatively deep, unornamented eaves. It is an elementary expression of American Gothic Revival architecture.

It was listed on the National Register of Historic Places in 1976.

== History ==
Chester Presbyterian Church was organized on June 16, 1878. The original church building, now known as Wyatt Chapel, was eventually built in 1880 on the east side of Winfree Street designed by architect Grove, T. Martin. The belfry was reconstructed after being blown off in 1948. Wyatt Chapel was moved to Osborne Road in 1951 but soon got moved again in 1954 to Osborne Road and VA 10. In 1956, a new building with a sanctuary, a fellowship hall with kitchen, Sunday school rooms and offices, was built facing West Hundred Road. Though most activities moved to the new building, Wyatt Chapel continued to be used for Sunday school, scouts, and intimate wedding ceremonies. A new educational building was completed in 1967, providing much needed Sunday School space.

With the continued growth in the congregation, the decision was made to move Wyatt Chapel once again, and a new larger sanctuary and narthex were completed in 1995.
