= Pocahontas State Park =

State park in Virginia, United States

Pocahontas State Park, Virginia, USA
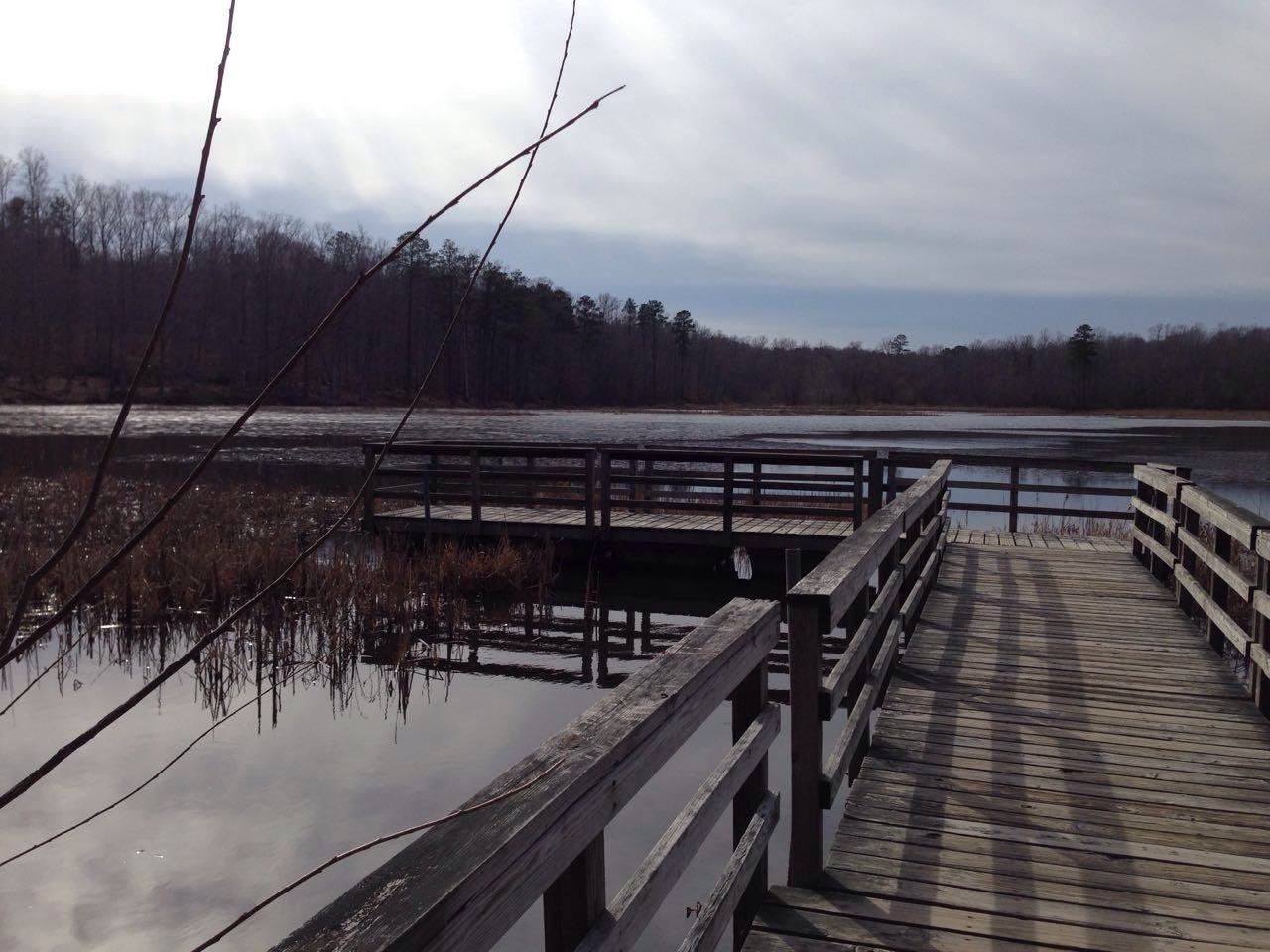
- Lake at Pocahontas State Park in Virginia

- Location within Virginia Location within the United States
- Location: 10301 State Park Rd., Chesterfield, VA 23832
- Coordinates: 37°22′29.3022″N 77°34′18.4146″W
- Area: 7,919 acres (3,205 ha)
- Established: 1946
- Governing body: Virginia Department of Conservation and Recreation

Pocahontas State Park is a state park located in Chesterfield County, Virginia, United States, not far from the state capital of Richmond. The park was laid out by the Civilian Conservation Corps along the Swift Creek, and at 7,919 acres (32.05 km^{2}) it is Virginia's largest state park. In 2015, the park welcomed 1,142,601 visitors.

The park is named after Chief Powhatan's daughter Pocahontas.

== Civilian Conservation Corps Museum ==
The park is the site of the Civilian Conservation Corps Museum with exhibits about the work of the Civilian Conservation Corps in Virginia. Located in a building constructed by the CCC, the museum features exhibits including photographs, artifacts and personal mementos.

== Mountain biking ==
There are many miles of mountain biking singletrack available at Pocahontas for a variety of skill levels. These narrow trails feature log hops, tight turns, water crossings, and rock gardens. The park uses a ski style grading system to mark the singletrack, which is different from other trails in the park. There are 3 distinct trail systems in the park: Morgan trail system, Lakeview trail system, and the newest system, Swift Creek trail system. These trails are maintained in large part by a 501c3 volunteer organization, the Friends of Pocahontas aka FOPSP. A number of races occur annually in the park.

In addition to the single track, there are many miles of multi-use fire roads around the park. A number of fairly well-marked routes exist for visitors to follow.

== Fishing ==
The park has a number of streams and lakes for fishing. The park also has a few fishing events and permit-free days, except for catching small panfish, largemouth bass, and pike.

== See also ==
- List of Virginia state parks
