= Hallsborough Tavern =

- U.S. National Register of Historic Places
- Virginia Landmarks Register
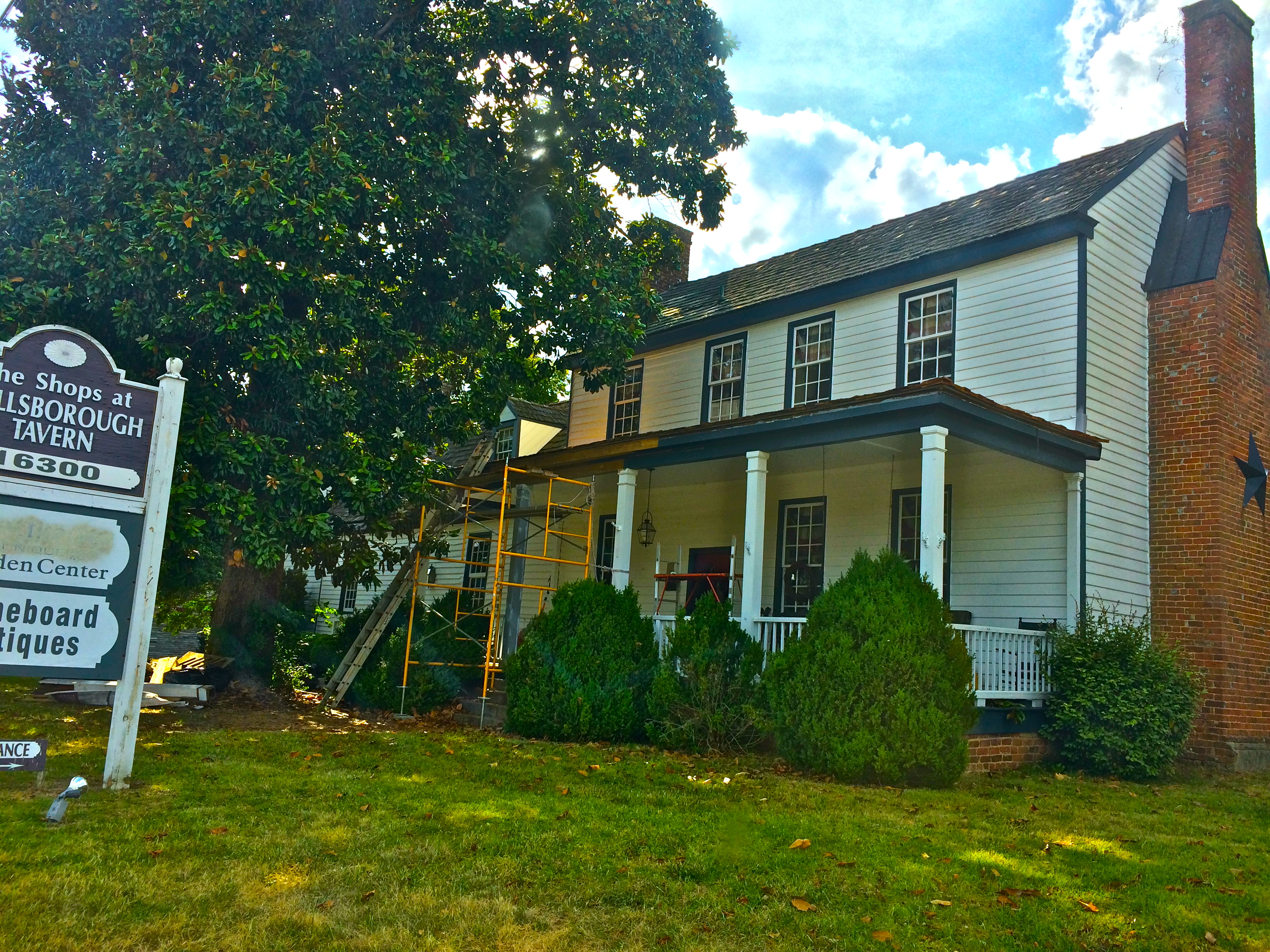

- Location within Virginia Location within the United States
- Location: West of Midlothian on U.S. 60, near Midlothian, Virginia
- Coordinates: 37°30′31″N 77°42′40″W
- Area: 1.5 acres (0.61 ha)
- Built: c. 1790
- NRHP reference No.: 80004181
- VLR No.: 020-0030

Significant dates
- Added to NRHP: March 17, 1980
- Designated VLR: December 18, 1979

Hallsborough Tavern is a historic inn and tavern located near Midlothian, Chesterfield County, Virginia. The original center section was built about 1790, and is a 1 1/2-story, three-bay, double pen frame structure on a brick foundation. It was expanded by 1832, with the addition of the 1 1/2-story western section and two-story, double pen eastern section. It served travelers on the old Buckingham Road throughout much of the 19th century.

It was listed on the National Register of Historic Places in 1980.
