= Hallsboro Store =

Historic commercial building in Virginia, United States

- U.S. National Register of Historic Places
- Virginia Landmarks Register
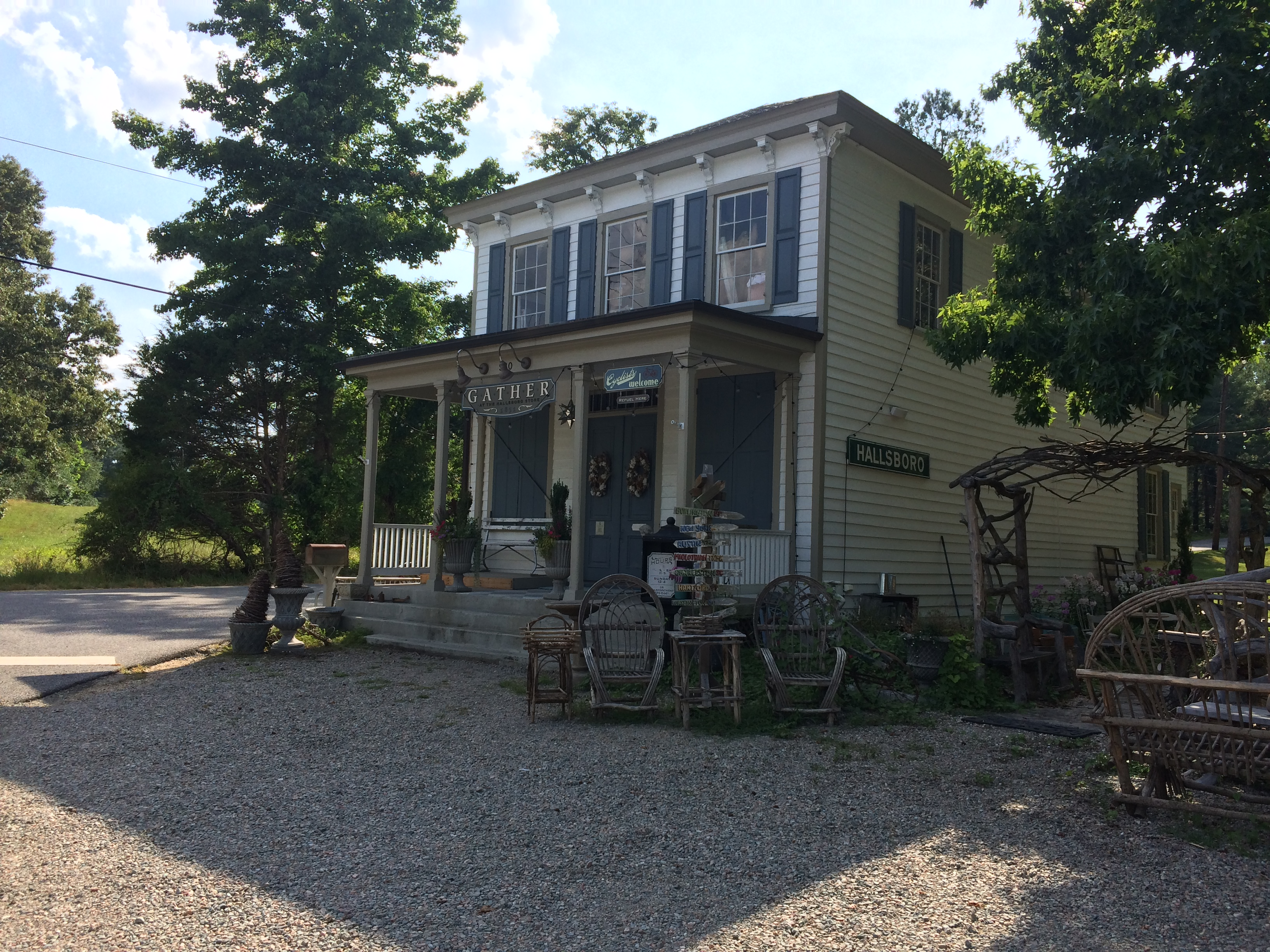

- Location within Virginia Location within the United States
- Location: 920 Hallsboro Rd., Midlothian, Virginia
- Coordinates: 37°29′26″N 77°43′35″W
- Area: 3.1 acres (1.3 ha)
- Built: c. 1885
- Architectural style: Late Victorian
- NRHP reference No.: 05000133
- VLR No.: 020-0407

Significant dates
- Added to NRHP: March 10, 2005
- Designated VLR: December 1, 2004

Hallsboro Store is a historic general store located near Midlothian, Chesterfield County, Virginia. It was built around 1885 and is a two-story wood-frame structure set on a concrete and brick foundation in a Late Victorian style. The store was operated by a succession of prominent Chesterfield County businessmen, and it served as a post office and general store for its community for many generations. The Hallsboro Post Office was housed at the store from the time it was built until 1962.

It was listed on the National Register of Historic Places in 2005. It was designated at a county landmark in 2019.
