= Brandermill, Virginia =

CDP in Chesterfield County, Virginia, United States

Coordinates: 37°26′26.8″N 77°38′57.9″W

Brandermill
- CDP
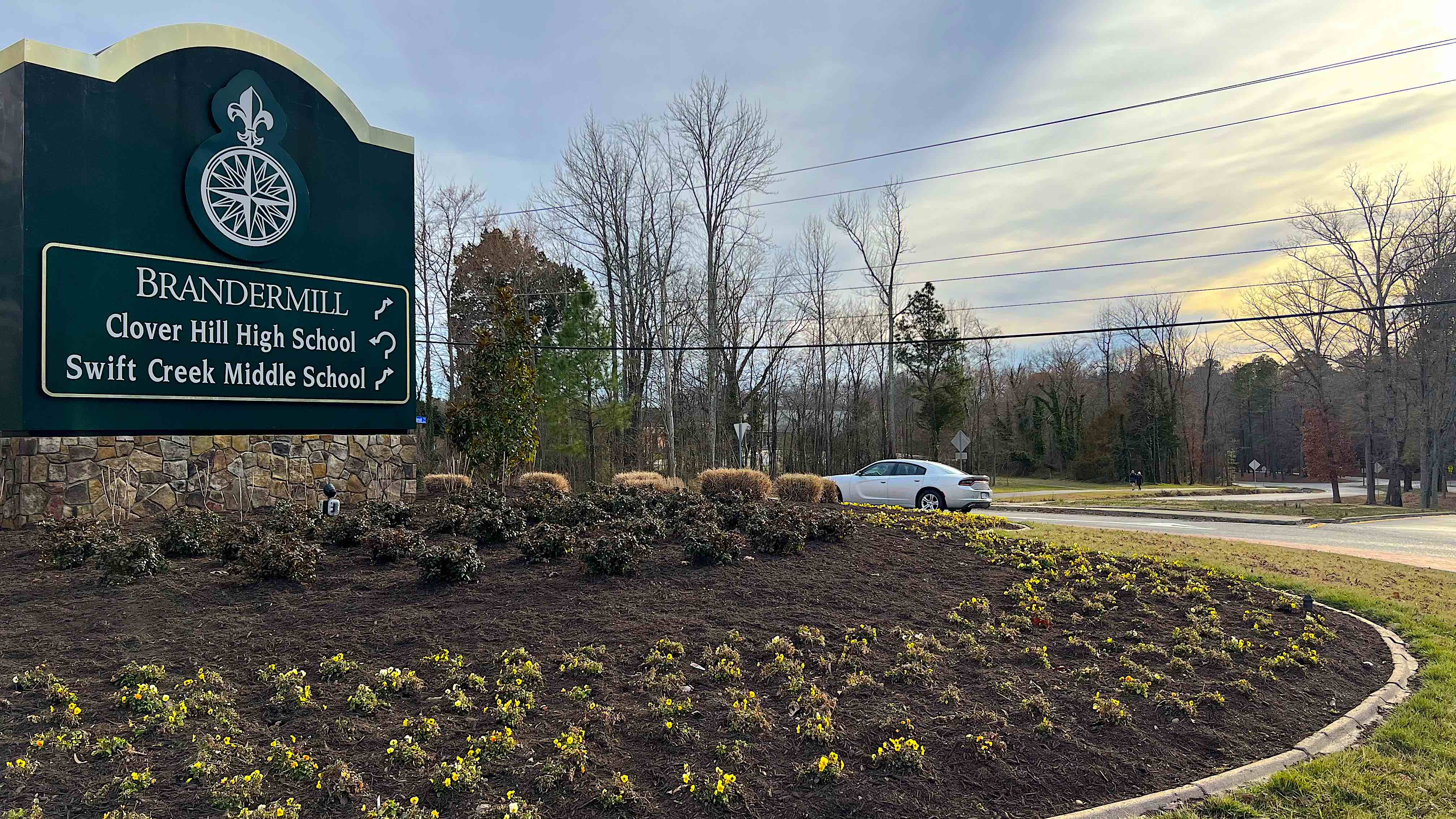
- An entrance to Brandermill
- Country: United States
- State: Virginia
- County: Chesterfield

Population (2020)
  - Total: 13,730
- Time zone: UTC−5 (Eastern (EST))
  - Summer (DST): UTC−4 (EDT)
- ZIP codes: 23112
- Area code(s): 804/686

Brandermill is a major suburban, residential, and commercial development in Chesterfield County, Virginia, United States. It is located near Midlothian at the southern terminus of the Powhite Parkway and is centered on the Swift Creek Reservoir. The Census Bureau defines it as a census-designated place (CDP), with a population of 13,730 as of 2020, slightly higher than its population in 2010 of 13,173.

== History ==
Chesterfield County approved the planned community of Brandermill in 1974 and construction began in 1975. In 1977, Brandermill developers East West Partners (then known as "The Brandermill group") were recognized for their work when Brandermill was named "The Best Planned Community in America" by Better Homes and Gardens and the National Association of Home Builders. It was the first planned community in Chesterfield County. It has a golf course, a church, and three public schools adjacent to it: Swift Creek Elementary School, Swift Creek Middle School, and Clover Hill High School.

Notorious mass murderer John List was living under the alias Robert "Bob" Peter Clark on Sagewood Trace in the Sagewood neighborhood in Brandermill when he was arrested in June 1989.

== Demographics ==
Historical population
| Census | Pop. | Note | %± |
|---|---|---|---|
| 2010 | 13,173 | | — |
| 2020 | 13,730 | | 4.2% |
U.S. Decennial Census; 2010 2020

Brandermill was first listed as a census designated place in the 2010 U.S. census.

=== Racial and ethnic composition ===
Brandermill CDP, Virginia – Racial and ethnic composition Note: the US Census treats Hispanic/Latino as an ethnic category. This table excludes Latinos from the racial categories and assigns them to a separate category. Hispanics/Latinos may be of any race.
| Race / Ethnicity (NH = Non-Hispanic) | Pop 2010 | Pop 2020 | % 2010 | % 2020 |
|---|---|---|---|---|
| White alone (NH) | 10,607 | 10,205 | 80.52% | 74.33% |
| Black or African American alone (NH) | 1,402 | 1,567 | 10.64% | 11.41% |
| Native American or Alaska Native alone (NH) | 26 | 37 | 0.20% | 0.27% |
| Asian alone (NH) | 448 | 471 | 3.40% | 3.43% |
| Native Hawaiian or Pacific Islander alone (NH) | 7 | 1 | 0.05% | 0.01% |
| Other race alone (NH) | 9 | 75 | 0.07% | 0.55% |
| Mixed race or Multiracial (NH) | 257 | 648 | 1.95% | 4.72% |
| Hispanic or Latino (any race) | 417 | 726 | 3.17% | 5.29% |
| Total | 13,173 | 13,730 | 100.00% | 100.00% |

=== 2020 census ===
As of the 2020 census, Brandermill had a population of 13,730. The median age was 42.7 years. 20.7% of residents were under the age of 18 and 22.2% of residents were 65 years of age or older. For every 100 females there were 89.0 males, and for every 100 females age 18 and over there were 85.8 males age 18 and over.

100.0% of residents lived in urban areas, while 0.0% lived in rural areas.

There were 5,785 households in Brandermill, of which 29.1% had children under the age of 18 living in them. Of all households, 51.0% were married-couple households, 13.8% were households with a male householder and no spouse or partner present, and 29.1% were households with a female householder and no spouse or partner present. About 27.2% of all households were made up of individuals and 13.3% had someone living alone who was 65 years of age or older.

There were 6,003 housing units, of which 3.6% were vacant. The homeowner vacancy rate was 1.7% and the rental vacancy rate was 4.7%.

Racial composition as of the 2020 census
| Race | Number | Percent |
|---|---|---|
| White | 10,362 | 75.5% |
| Black or African American | 1,606 | 11.7% |
| American Indian and Alaska Native | 45 | 0.3% |
| Asian | 472 | 3.4% |
| Native Hawaiian and Other Pacific Islander | 4 | 0.0% |
| Some other race | 256 | 1.9% |
| Two or more races | 985 | 7.2% |

== List of Neighborhoods ==
There are several neighborhoods in the Brandermill development.

| Neighborhood | Location |
|---|---|
| Arrowood | Northern Brandermill, off of Sandyridge Parkway |
| Autumn Woods | Northern Brandermill, off of Brandermill Parkway, near Genito Road. |
| Barnes Spring | Northern Brandermill, off of Brandermill Parkway, near Genito Road. |
| Bayport Landing | Southern Brandermill, off of Harbour Pointe Road, |
| Birnam Woods | Northern Brandermill, off of Brandermill Parkway, near Old Hundred Road. |
| Carriage Creek | Northern Brandermill, off of Brandermill Parkway, and Charter Colony Parkway. |
| Chimney House | Northern Brandermill, off of Brandermill Parkway. |
| Copper Hill | Northern Brandermill, off of Sandyridge Parkway. |
| Court Ridge | Southern Brandermill, off of Millridge Parkway. |
| Cove Ridge | Northwestern Brandermill. Westernmost neighborhood of Brandermill off of Genito Road, nearby the Swift Creek Reservoir. |
| Cradle Hill | Northern Brandermill, off of Sandyridge Parkway. |
| Crosstimbers | Northern Brandermill, off of Sandyridge Parkway. |
| Deer Meadow | Northern Brandermill, off of Brandermill Parkway, near Old Hundred Road. |
| East Bluff | Southern Brandermill, off of Harbour Pointe Road. |
| Five Springs | Southern Brandermill, off of Millridge Parkway. |
| Fortunes Ridge | Central Brandermill, off of North Beach Road. |
| Fox Chase | Northern Brandermill, surrounded by Qual Hill Drive, Overcreek Lane, and Genito Road. |
| Garrison Place | Northern Brandermill, off of Sandyridge Parkway. |
| Glen Eagles | Central Brandermill, off of Millridge Parkway. |
| Harbour Bluff | Southern Brandermill, off of Harbour Pointe Road. |
| Harbour Ridge | Southern Brandermill, off of Harbour Pointe Road. |
| Harbourwood | Southern Brandermill, off of Harbour Pointe Road. |
| Heritage Woods | Central Brandermill, surrounded by Millridge Parkway, and Planters Wood Road. |
| Huntgate Woods | Northern Brandermill, off of Brandermill Parkway, near Genito Road. |
| Hunts Bridge | Northern Brandermill, off of South Old Hundred Road. |
| Lands End | Southern Brandermill, off of Harbour Pointe Road. |
| Litchfield Bluff | Southern Brandermill, off of Millridge Parkway. |
| Long Hill | Northern Brandermill, off of Brandermill Parkway. |
| Long Shadow | Southern Brandermill, off of Millridge Parkway. |
| McTyre's Cove | Central Brandermill, off of Brandermill Parkway, nearby Brandermill Country Club, and the Commodore Point boat launch. |
| Millcrest | Northwestern Brandermill, off of Watermill Parkway. Last neighborhood in Brandermill before the cutoff to the Watermill community. |
| Murfield Green | Central Brandermill, off of Nuttree Woods Drive, nearby the golf greens at the Brandermill Country Club, and Brandermill parkway. |
| North Point | Southern Brandermill, off of Harbour Pointe Road. |
| Northwich | Central Brandermill, off of Millridge Parkway. |
| Nuttree Woods | Central Brandermill, off of Brandermill Parkway, adjacent the golf greens at the Brandermill Country Club. |
| Oak Springs | Northern Brandermill, inside the Huntgate Woods neighborhood. |
| Old Fox Trail | Central Brandermill, off of Millridge Parkway. |
| Pebble Creek | Central Brandermill, off of Brandermill Parkway, adjacent to Swift Creek Middle School. |
| Planters Wood | Southern Brandermill, off of Millridge Parkway. |
| Poplar Grove | Central Brandermill, off of Millridge Parkway. |
| Promontory Pointe | Southern Brandermill, off of Harbour Pointe Road. |
| Quail Hill | Northern Brandermill, off of Brandermill Parkway, across the street from Swift Creek Middle School. Surrounded by Hunts Bridge and Fox Chase. |
| Regatta Pointe | Northern Brandermill, off of North Beach Road. |
| Ridge Creek | Northern Brandermill, off of Brandermill Parkway. |
| Riverbirch Trace | Central Brandermill, off of Brandermill Parkway. |
| Rockport Landing | Southern Brandermill, off of Harbour Pointe Road. |
| Sagewood | Northern Brandermill, off of Brandermill Parkway, near Genito Road. |
| Sandy Brook | Northern Brandermill, off of Sandyridge Parkway. |
| Seven Oaks | Central Brandermill, off of Brandermill Parkway. |
| Shadow Ridge | Northern Brandermill, off of Brandermill Parkway, near Old Hundred Road. |
| Shady Pointe | Northern Brandermill, off of Sandyridge Parkway. |
| Shallowford Landing | Central Brandermill, off of North Beach Road. |
| Shallowford Trace | Central Brandermill, off of North Beach Road. |
| Spinnaker Cove | Southern Brandermill, off of Harbour Hill Road, near Hull Street Road. |
| Spring Gate | Northern Brandermill, off of Huntgate Woods Road, near Brandermill Parkway. |
| Steeple Chase | Northern Brandermill, off of Fox Chase Lane, at Genito Road. |
| Sterlings Bridge | Northern Brandermill, off of Brandermill Parkway. |
| Stoney Ridge | Central Brandermill, off of Brandermill Parkway. |
| Sutters Mill | Northern Brandermill, off of Sandyridge Parkway, near Genito Road. |
| Tanglebrook | Northern Brandermill, off of Sandyridge Parkway. |
| The Oaks | Central Brandermill, off of North Beach Road. |
| Thornridge | Southern Brandermill, off West Village Green Drive, near Hull Street Road. |
| Three Bridges | Northern Brandermill, off of Fox Chase Drive. |
| Timber Ridge | Central Brandermill, off of Brandermill Parkway. Across from the Brandermill Country Club. |
| Turtle Hill | Northern Brandermill, off of Brandermill Parkway, near Old Hundred Road. |
| Two Notch | Northern Brandermill, off of Sandyridge Parkway. |
| Walkers Ferry | Central Brandermill, off of Brandermill Parkway. |
| Walnut Creek | Northern Brandermill, off of Brandermill Parkway, near Genito Road. |
| Watkins Glen | Northern Brandermill, off of Sandyridge Parkway, near Genito Road. |
| Whispering Oaks | Northern Brandermill, off of Brandermill Parkway. |
| Winterberry Ridge | Central Brandermill, off of Millridge Parkway. |
| Woodbridge Crossing | Northern Brandermill, off of Genito Road. |

== Parks and Recreation ==
The Brandermill development has various parks and recreational features. Brandermill has 15 miles of paved walking and cycling trails around the community. There are several parks and playgrounds located around Brandermill, such as those at Sunday Park, Nuttree Park, and Waterside Park. Brandermill's parks are not open to the public. Sunday Park has a private boat launch and marina for kayaking; a parking pass is required to access Sunday Park. There is also a marina located in Harbour Pointe. In addition to parks and boating, the Brandermill Country Club maintains an 18-hole golf course.
