= Bethel Baptist Church (Midlothian, Virginia) =

Historic church in Virginia, United States

- U.S. National Register of Historic Places
- Virginia Landmarks Register
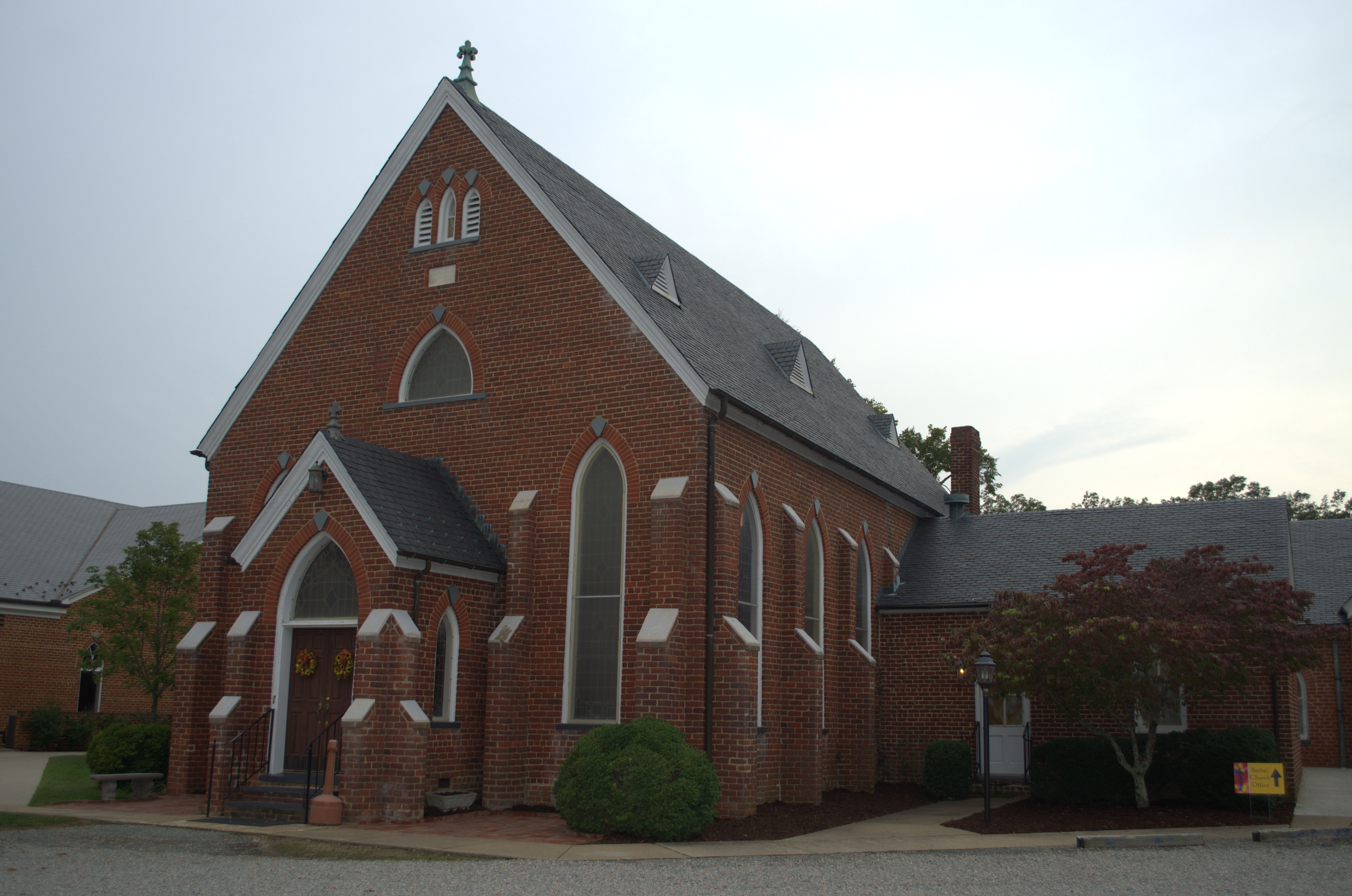
- Huguenot Springs Bethel Baptist Church, September 2012

- Location within Virginia Location within the United States
- Location: 1100 Huguenot Springs Rd., Midlothian, Virginia
- Coordinates: 37°30′43″N 77°42′41″W
- Area: 20.1 acres (8.1 ha)
- Built: 1894: 129 years ago
- Architect: West, W.C
- Architectural style: Late Gothic Revival
- NRHP reference No.: 99000141
- VLR No.: 020-0111

Significant dates
- Added to NRHP: February 22, 1999
- Designated VLR: September 14, 1998

Bethel Baptist Church is a historic church complex and cemetery located at Midlothian, Chesterfield County, Virginia. It was built in 1894, and is a brick church with a steeply pitched gable roof in the Late Gothic Revival style. It is the third church on this site. Wings were added to the original church in 1906, 1980, and 1987. Also on the property is the contributing church cemetery that includes approximately 500 burials including soldiers of virtually every war in American history from the American Revolutionary War through the Vietnam War.

It was listed on the National Register of Historic Places in 1999.
