= Castlewood (Chesterfield, Virginia) =

Historic house in Virginia, United States

- U.S. National Register of Historic Places
- Virginia Landmarks Register
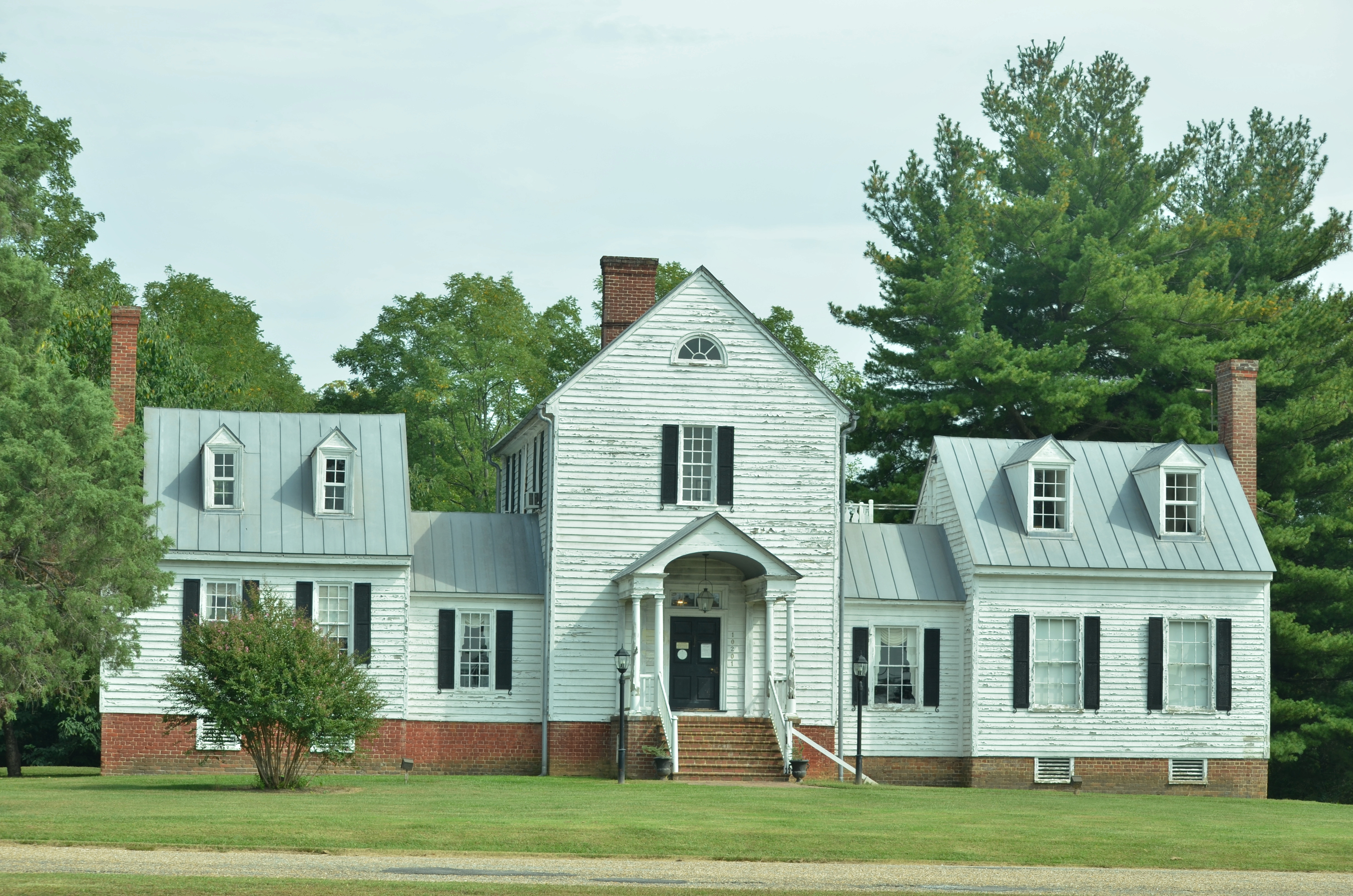
- Castlewood, September 2012

- Location within Virginia Location within the United States
- Location: VA 10, Chesterfield, Virginia
- Coordinates: 37°22′31″N 77°30′11″W
- Area: 5.8 acres (2.3 ha)
- Built: c. 1810-1820
- NRHP reference No.: 76002099
- VLR No.: 020-0014

Significant dates
- Added to NRHP: November 21, 1976
- Designated VLR: June 15, 1976

Castlewood, also known as the Poindexter House and The Old Parsonage, is a historic plantation house located near Chesterfield, Chesterfield County, Virginia. It was built between about 1810 and 1820, and is a long, five-part frame house that was built in at least two or three stages. It consists of a two-story, one-bay-wide central section, flanked by 1 1/2-story, two-bay wings, connected to the main block by one-story, one-bay hyphens. Also on the property is a contributing frame, pyramidal roofed structure with a coved cornice that may have housed a dairy.

It was listed on the National Register of Historic Places in 1976.
