= Swift Creek Reservoir =

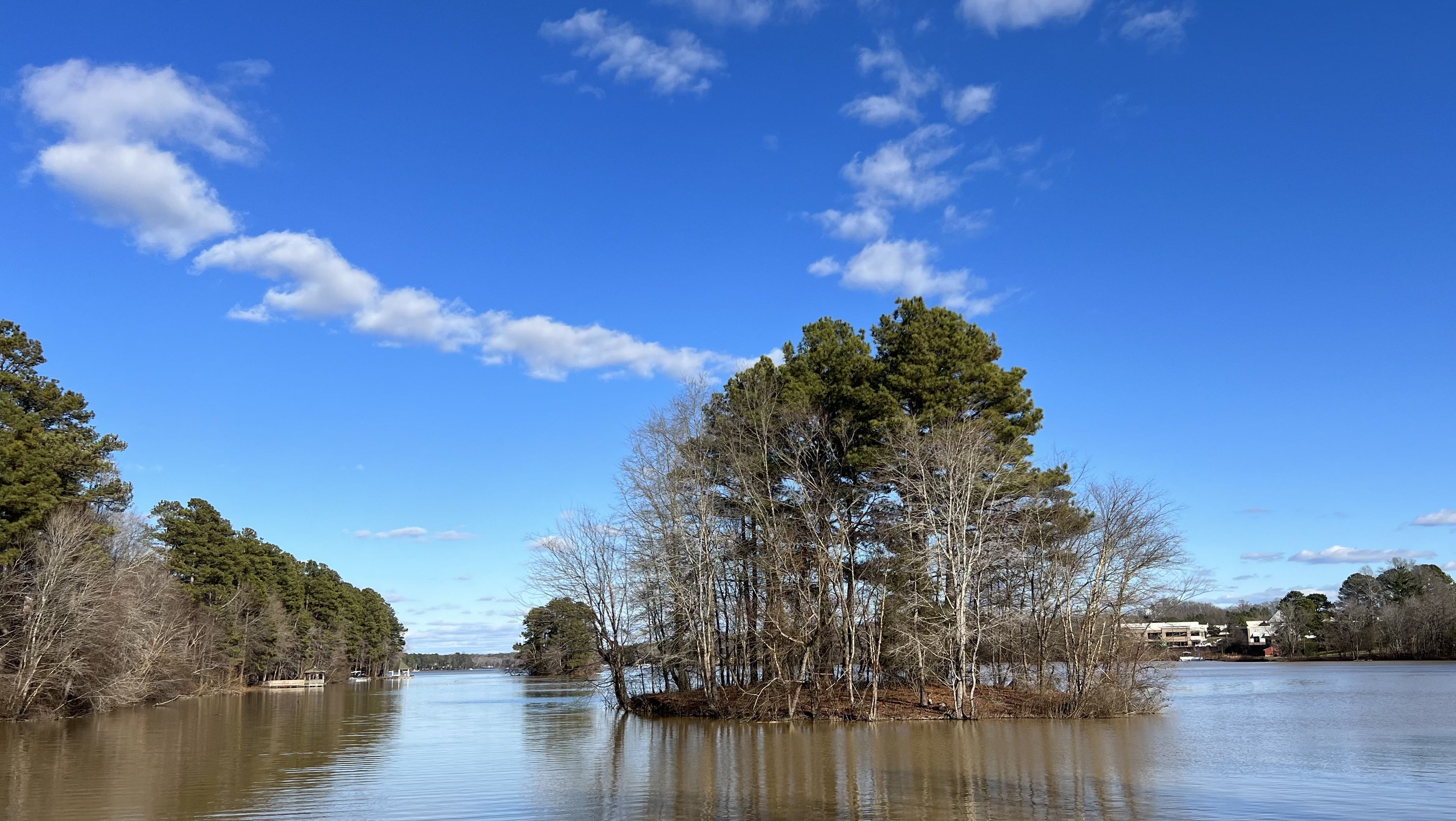
- Swift Creek Reservoir as viewed from Shelter Cover Parking Dock, Woodlake.

- Location within Virginia Location within the United States
- Location: Chesterfield County, Virginia
- Coordinates: 37°24′37″N 77°40′29″W
- Type: Reservoir
- Built: 1965
- Surface area: 1,700 acres (690 ha)
- Surface elevation: 177 ft (54 m)

The Swift Creek Reservoir is a 1,700 acres (690 ha), 5,200,000,000 US gallons (2.0×10^{10} L; 4.3×10^{9} imp gal), man made lake in Chesterfield County, Virginia. It is 20–25 feet (6.1–7.6 m) deep at the channel and 6–12 feet (1.8–3.7 m) deep on average. It provides 20 percent of the county's water supply, and has a watershed area of 61.9 square miles (160 km^{2}). It is fed by eight tributary creeks: Little Tomahawk Creek, Tomahawk Creek, Swift Creek, Otterdale Creek, Deep Creek, West Branch, Dry Creek, and Fuqua Creek. The reservoir provides drinking water and a recreational area to Chesterfield residents. There is no public access to the reservoir. Access from Sunday Park is limited to residents of the Brandermill community, in addition to various private docks and launches found throughout the Brandermill and Woodlake communities.

== History ==
The Swift Creek Reservoir was built in 1965 to be a public water supply for surrounding communities. In 1992, the Watershed Management Committee was established by the Board of Supervisors to protect and preserve the reservoir. They established limits on construction and oversaw development and maintenance of nearby communities. In 2000 the Watershed Management Master Plan was started to reach former goals such as stormwater treatment facilities and reduction of all pollutants. In more recent years projects have been undertaken to improve the infrastructure on and around the reservoir including repairing and replacing multiple bridges.

== Real estate ==
There are two major developments that are built on the waterfront of the reservoir, Brandermill and Woodlake, and many other small neighborhoods.
