= Julien Binford =

American painter

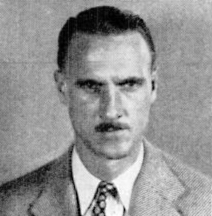
- Julien Binford in 1944
- Born: December 25, 1908; Norwood, Powhatan County, Virginia, U.S.
- Died: September 12, 1997 (aged 88); Charlotte, North Carolina, U.S.
- Occupation: Painter
- Spouse: Élisabeth Bollée (1908–1984)
- Parent(s): Julien Hall Binford, Jr. and Elizabeth R. Kennon from Norwood plantation, Powhatan county, Virginia

Julien Binford (December 25, 1908 – September 12, 1997) was an American painter. He studied at the Art Institute of Chicago and then in France. Settling in Powhatan County, Virginia, he was known for his paintings of the rural population of his neighborhood as well as for his murals. During World War II (1944) he lived in New York City and painted views of the port during the war. These paintings (4 full pages in color) were featured in Life magazine. In 1946 he was appointed professor of painting at Mary Washington College in Fredericksburg, Virginia, where he worked until his retirement in 1971.

== Youth ==
Julien Binford was born to Julien Binford and Elizabeth Rodman Kennon on December 25, 1908 at Norwood Plantation, his maternal grandfather's estate, in Powhatan County, Virginia. His parents were both from old Southern families and Julien was the first cousin four times removed of Confederate Major General Henry Heth through his mother. He spent his childhood at Norwood before moving to Atlanta, Georgia. After high school, he entered premedical school at Emory University in Atlanta, Georgia. The director of the new Atlanta High Museum noticed his proficiency in rendering dissections and encouraged him to concentrate on developing his painting talent. Following this advice, Binford studied at the Art Institute of Chicago where he excelled. In 1932, he was awarded the Edward L. Ryerson Traveling Fellowship ($2,500) and spent three years studying in Paris.

In France he met Élisabeth Bollée de Vautibault (b. August 9, 1908), daughter of Carlotta and Léon Bollée, a French automobile manufacturer before World War I. She was the goddaughter of aviation pioneer Wilbur Wright, who made his first flight in france in honour of her birth. Élisabeth had married Count Jean Maurice Gilbert de Vautibault in 1927 and had published several volumes of poems (under the name Élisabeth de Vautibault), which were praised by well-known poets such as Jean Paulhan and Léon-Paul Fargue. She divorced de Vautibault after meeting Julien Binford and continued writing poems both in French and in English. She converted from Greek Orthodox (her mother was Greek) to the Baptist faith after moving to America before she married Julien.

== The early years ==
In 1935, Binford returned to Virginia and bought a small farm called The Foundry. The property had belonged to Thomas Jefferson's father. After having formally surrendered at Appomattox Court House, General Lee, while on his way to Richmond, spent his last night as a Confederate general on April 14, 1865, camping on the lawn of his brothers property which adjoined the property Julien had recently acquired. The original building of The Foundry was however in ruins and Binford and his wife, Élisabeth, lived in a windy shack with no water, no lights, and no heat. In the first years they lived mainly by farming. After 1945, when their finances had improved, they undertook a massive reconstruction of the buildings.

The simple life-style influenced Binford's painting. His work, which in his one-man showings in Paris had been abstract, became more realistic. He relied on his neighbors and their environment for inspiration. Binford established a close relationship with his African-American neighbors, using them as the subject of his work on numerous occasions. Several of his paintings, presented in Manhattan's Midtown Galleries, look like a black-belt village on Saturday afternoon.

One of his most famous works is the mural titled "The Lord Over Jordan" in Shiloh Baptist Church in Powhatan, Virginia. This is one of the rare occasions that a black congregation commissioned a white artist to decorate its church. The mural, a 12-foot x 12-foot painting, was unveiled with impressive ceremonies and forms the background to the church's baptismal pool. As the congregation was poor, he agreed to be paid in produce, two wagon loads of chickens, corn, potatoes, and beets, which helped the Binfords tide over the winter.

== War years ==
In the 1940s he developed a relationship with a gallery in New York City. The success of his work allowed Julien and Élisabeth Binford to move to Manhattan because Life Magazine had commissioned him to paint the activities going on in the harbor near the end of the Second World War.

One of the New Deal programs for the economic recovery during Great Depression was designed to provide jobs, not only for manual laborers but for artists as well. The U.S. Treasury Department's Section of Fine Arts commissioned the painting of murals on walls of post offices and other public buildings, which lead to a school known as "New Deal Art". One of these was the mural for the Post Office of Forest, Mississippi. The mural intended to illustrate both the name of the city and the lumber industry of the surrounding county. His oil on canvas mural, completed in April 1941, presents four loggers skidding logs out of the woods. The painting, displayed temporarily at the Mint Museum in Charlotte, N.C..Charlotte, North Carolina, was praised by the Charlotte Observer. An editor of the Progressive Farmer called it the best painting he had ever seen in a public building.

The mural was the only one Binford did for the Fine Arts Section. In 1941 Binford was commissioned to paint a mural of the burning of Richmond (1865) for the Post Office of Saunders, Virginia. Intending to illustrate the suffering of the southerners during the last days of the Confederacy, Binford submitted a preliminary sketch showing a street scene with looters, a mother trying to escape with her baby over bodies of dead soldiers lying on the ground, a half-naked woman who had torn off her blouse to prevent herself from being scorched, a horseman riding roughshod over all. The sketch raised controversy. A former president-general of the United Daughters of the Confederacy stated: "It is one of the most horrible things I've ever seen.". Bishop James Cannon Jr. of the Methodist Episcopal Church, South, who was very influential in Virginia politics, published a criticism in the Richmond Times-Dispatch indicating: "The woman's back and hips are poorly portrayed.". Though Julien Binford angrily retorted: "When and how did this bishop become an authority on the 'backs and hips' of nude women?", he never got the commission. Another post office mural, in Ahoskie, North Carolina, is reported as "missing".

However, during 1942 his work received the attention of Time, Newsweek and Life, which presented reproductions of some of his paintings. During World War II, he worked on a series of paintings titled "New York Harbor at War" which were published in a special section of Life.

== Teaching activity ==
In 1946 he was appointed professor of painting at Mary Washington College in Fredericksburg, Virginia. Among his students was the American artist Anne Everett. He was the organizer of regular meetings with a small group of friends, including Emil Schnellock, Matila Ghyka, and Milton Stansbury. He was a faculty member for 25 years until 1971, when he retired to devote more time to his painting. Some of his works are in the Mary Washington University Galleries' permanent collection.

Edward Alvey, Jr., dean of Mary Washington, wrote of Binford:

He was a warm, friendly, natural person. He painted with a sensitivity and devotion, establishing a feeling of rapport between the artist and the viewer. His work has a freshness and originality that well exemplifies Binford's own zest for life and his desire to share its beauty with others.

His wife died on July 11, 1984. Julien lived alone for the next ten years and then moved to Charlotte to be with his sister, Eleanor Binford Booth at Southminster retirement center. He died in Charlotte on September 12, 1997, at the age of 88.
