= Catharine Furnace =

Coordinates: 38°17′19″N 77°38′54″W

Catharine Furnace is a historic iron furnace in Fredericksburg and Spotsylvania National Military Park, near Chancellorsville in Spotsylvania County, Virginia. It was built in 1837 and closed down ten years later. During the American Civil War the furnace came into use again.

John S. Wellford was the manager, principal owner and driving force of Catharine Furnace from its foundation to his death in 1846. His success in obtaining government ordnance contracts for the furnace was based on his personal social network. Relying on these contracts, the company neglected to expand on the open market. When Wellford died in 1846, the loss of his network therefore led to its failure.

In 1861, the furnace was taken over by a new company. It began its operations by restoring and updating the furnace. During the Overland Campaign, the furnace was at least partly destroyed by Union troops, yet being rebuilt again in November 1864 and in full operation in February 1865. The furnace operated under contract with the Confederate government and enjoyed the release of skilled workers from the Confederate army for service at the furnace. After the end of the war, the demand for Virginia iron products ceased due to loss of government contract and competition from western Pennsylvania.

== First period, 1836-1847 ==
Catharine Furnace was founded and built by Fredericksburg Iron and Steel Manufacturing Company, a joint-stock company chartered in 1836, and owned by Francis B. Deane, John Heth, John S. Wellford, Edward H. Carmichael and William Crump with an undivided fifth interest each. Wellford was the financial backer of the company as well as the manager of the furnace. After several transfers, the owners of the company in 1841 was Wellford who owned two undivided and one half of a fifth, Carmichael whose fifth was held in trust by William N. Wellford (the son of John S.), Deane whose fifth was held in trust by Richard N. Cunningham, and Henry Taylor who had bought half of Crump's fifth. When Wellford in 1846 bought Taylor's half interest, he obtained the controlling interest of the company. Wellford was the financial backer of the company and the manager of the furnace. When the older Wellford died in 1846, the younger Wellford, in agreement with Carmichael and Cunningham, decided to terminate operations and sell the furnace. No purchaser was found, however, and the owners in 1847 abandoned the blast furnace and other buildings.

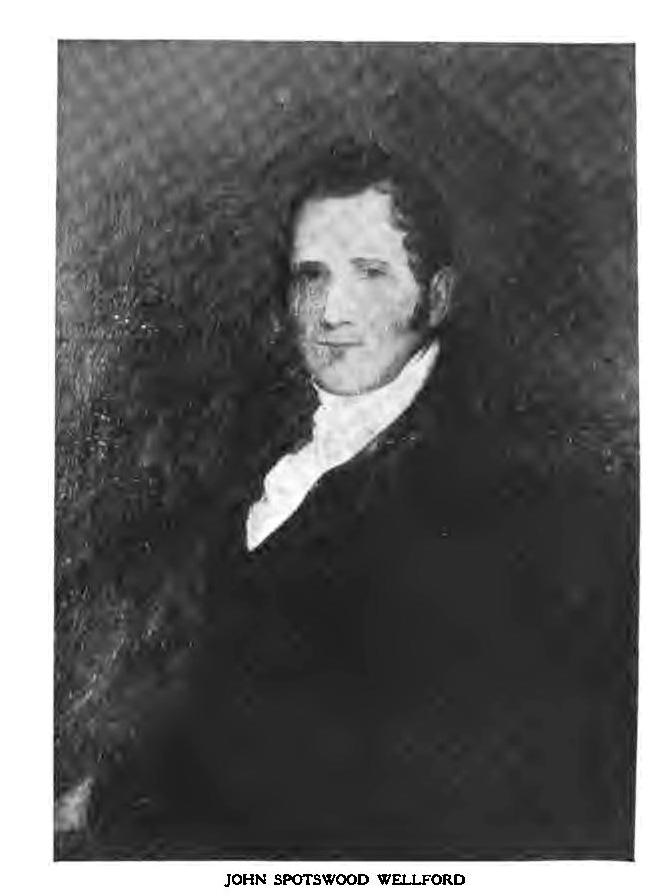
John S. Wellford in the 1840s.

John S. Wellford was a seasoned entrepreneur with a well developed personal network linking bankers, miners and other enthusiasts of internal improvements. The company acquired land with rich assets of iron ore and extensive woodlands suitable for charcoal production. Situated in an area with a surplus of enslaved workers that often were hired by iron works in the Shenandoah Valley, the furnace enjoyed a comparative advantage over its business rivals in acquiring inexpensive labor. Shares in the company was technically open for purchase by the general public, yet in reality it functioned as a partnership, with Wellford much of the time running the business as if he was a proprietary owner.

Wellford named the furnace after his mother, and by the early spring of 1838 the blast furnace was ready for operation. The panic of 1837 undermined the business prospects in the iron industry dramatically, yet Catharine Furnace could sell pig iron to Fredericksburg Union Manufacturing Company and to Tredegar Iron Company. Two of the company's owner, Edward H. Carmichael and William Crump, sat on the board of the Fredericksburg Union Co., while another owner, Francis B. Deane, was president of Tredegar ironworks. Tredegar remained Catherine Furnace's largest customer until 1841, when Tredegar's business was at a slump and Deane left the presidency. During these years Catherine Furnace had been run with an accumulated loss of thirty-nine thousand dollars.

From 1841, the business of Catharine Furnace began to improve through a number of ordnance contracts with the Navy and War departments. The Navy bought many tens of thousands of 32-pound shots, making the mainstay of the company's income. Wellford managed to persuade the Navy to give an extra allowance for transportation of the heavy shots from the furnace to Fredericksburg and from there to Gosport Navy Yard. He lost out to bids from the Tredegar Works, however, and in 1845 the deliveries had been discontinued. The Army replaced the Navy as Catherine Furnace's main customer, now buying 8 and 10 inch artillery shell and 12 and 24 pound shot to be delivered at Fort Monroe. When Wellford died in December 1846, the business fell apart. A large government contract never came through and the surviving owners were not able to take over his role as the driving force behind the company. The government only contracted with individuals, not companies, and Wellford's son and executor William Wellford, were neither willing, nor able to follow in his father's footsteps. The personal network that the older Wellford had created, and which he relied on to create business opportunities, could not be replicated by his son.

== Second period, 1861-1865 ==
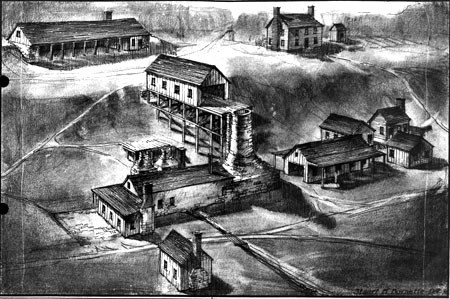
An artist's reconstruction of how Catharine Furnace might have looked like during the Civil War.

In 1861, the furnace was sold to a consortium made up of George B. Scott, A. Alexander Little, J. Warren Slaughter, Charles C. Wellford (the brother of the deceased John S.) and Charles B. Wellford (the nephew). Within two months, the consortium sold the property to The Catherine Furnace Company; a business venture with the purpose of mining and smelting ore and manufacturing iron, owned by the members of the consortium themselves. It was the increased demand for iron for arming the Confederate army and navy that made resumptions of operations profitable. Catharine Furnace entered into a contract with the Confederate Navy; it was agreed that the furnace would deliver 2,000 tons of pig iron over three years. The iron would be used either by the Tredegar Works or the Virginia State Armory, both at Richmond. The first blast took place in 1862 after the stack and the hot blast equipment was repaired and a steam engine was bought. Catherine Furnace also managed to obtain leave from the army for a large number of skilled workers needed for the rebuilding of the furnace.

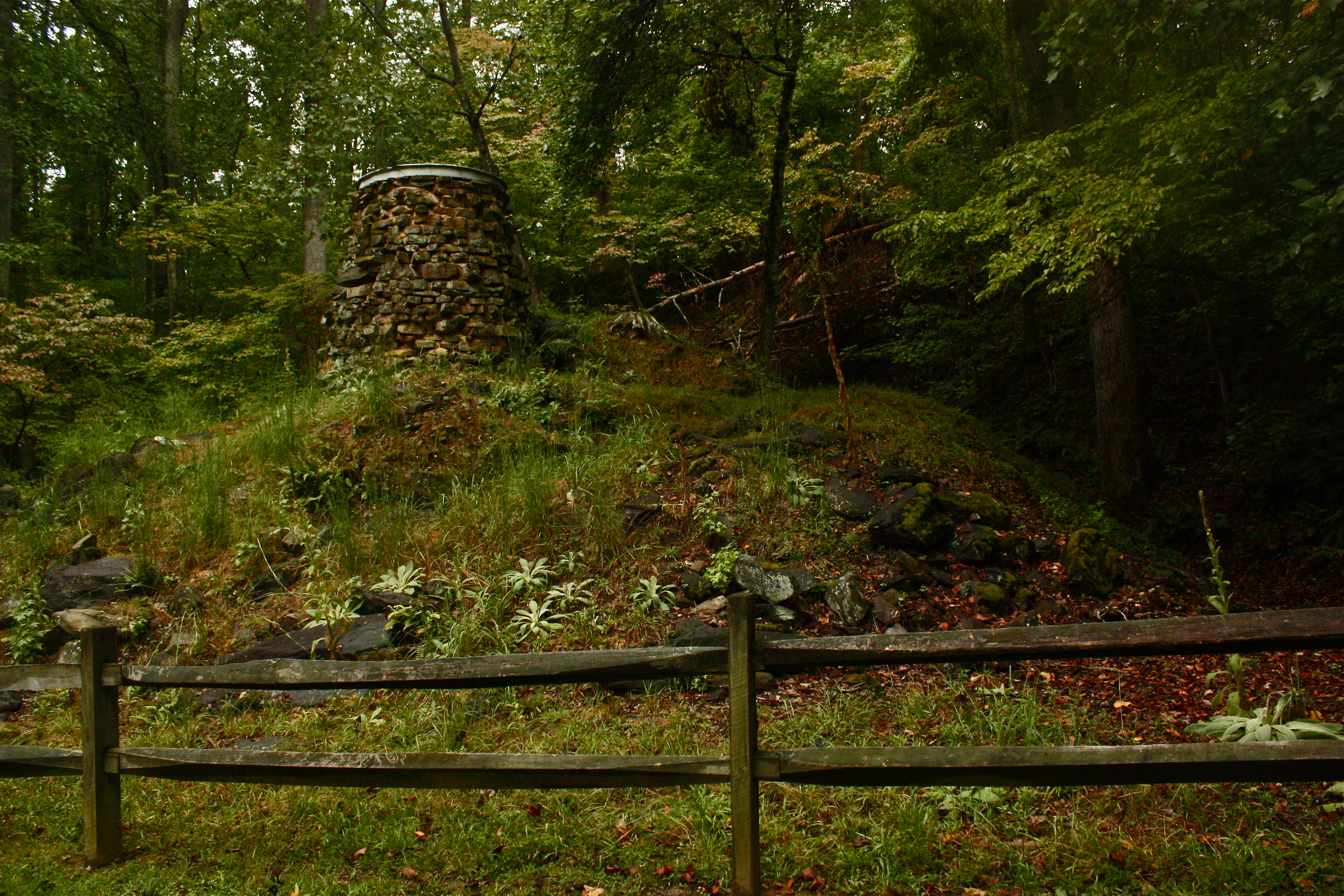
Ruins of the blast furnace at Catharine Furnace.This is the object in the center of the above reconstruction.

In July 1862, Charles C. Wellford was imprisoned by the federal government, but released after six weeks in custody. He later moved his family to Catharine Furnace when his house in the city was damaged during the battle of Fredericksburg. The battle of Chancellorsville raged around the furnace complex. Wellford had to run into the woods when federal soldiers early in the battle searched his house for enemies and food. Stonewall Jackson's flanking movement began at Catharine Furnace. The movement took place along cart roads that Wellford had told Stonewall's topographical engineer Jedediah Hotchkiss about, and was guided by Wellford's son, Charles B. Wellford. The Union Army believed Stonewall was retreating and opened artillery fire after them, forcing Wellford's wife and daughters to flee the bursting shells. A small confederate regiment held a defensive line at the furnace in order to buy time for Stonewall's flanking movement and fighting took place among the furnace buildings.

After the battle, Catharine Furnace Company claimed compensation for damages from the Confederate government. Most breakage did not occur during actual combat, but at the time when United States forces held the furnace while the real fighting took place north of it. The furnace was repaired and back in operation in early 1864. During the Overland Campaign, Union cavalry under General Custer met Confederate cavalry under Fitz Lee at the furnace on May 6, 1864. The fighting resulted in the destruction of the furnace, and it was officially reported by the Confederate Army that the complex was "burned by the enemy". It was not the end of Catharine Furnace, as it was rebuilt, back in operation and hiring slaves at least as early as at the end of January 1865. J. Warren Slaughter took over from Wellford as actual manager, but the end of the war ended the heavy demand for iron; the inventory was sold to Philadelphia and Slaughter was told to sell off the land.

== Appendix: Physical property 1847 ==
When the owners decided to sell Catharine Furnace in 1847, a description of the property was included in advertisements published in several papers. The property contained 4,684 acres of land; a dwelling house or family residence, two stories, 8 rooms, kitchen and room for servants; an engine house of stone, 20 feet wide and 70 feet long, and a steam engine of 14 horsepower; a blast furnace 36 feet high, built in 1837 with two tuyeres; a bridge house 33 feet wide and 47 feet long; a casting house 30 feet wide and 50 feet long with a shed on each side; cupolas; office; boarding house for workers; ball house; pattern house; smoke house; and a coal house.

== Appendix: Enslaved labor 1837-1846 ==
Although positions as moulders at Catharine Furnace were filled by itinerant white workers, the bulk of the labor needed was provided by enslaved workers hired from their masters. Patterns and gauges were provided by the government and the furnace did not develop its own labor force of skilled workers. In 1837, the labor force consisted of 86 enslaved workers, with 19 earmarked as mine workers. The number of hired enslaved workers varied over the years. The lowest figure was 33 in 1844 which was about the minimum number needed to run a furnace. The highest number was 100 in 1838. Wellford used both free and enslaved workers for making charcoal. Colliers were skilled workers and Wellford used to reward the enslaved collier he hired with small amount of cash, at the same time paying a large sum in hire for him. The menial task of chopping wood for the pile was done by unqualified enslaved labor. Enslaved workers at the furnace were also paid cash for extra work. There are records of enslaved workers trying to run away but no evidence of anyone succeeding.
