= Stephen C. Headley =

Stephen Cavanna Headley (born 5 August 1943 in Bryn Mawr, Pennsylvania) is a social anthropologist and a priest of the Eastern Orthodox Church. He is best known for his books on the anthropology of prayer and the ethnography of Central Java in Indonesia. He writes in French and English.

Headley was married to the American artist Anne Everett who died in 2013. He is the son of Young Adult writer Betty Cavanna who died in 2001.

== Education and academic posts ==
Headley earned a B.A. degree in Oriental studies (Chinese and Sanskrit) from Columbia College, Columbia University in 1956 where he studied under Anton Zigmund-Cerbu. He obtained an M.A. degree in Buddhist studies from Columbia University in 1969 and continued his studies in Paris with a diploma in Sanskrit philology at the Ecole Pratique des Hautes Etudes (1972) and a doctorate in social anthropology under Georges Condominas at the Sorbonne in 1979. He also studied theology at Saint Vladimir's Orthodox Theological Seminary (Crestwood, New York, 1966–1969) and at the St Sergius Institute of Orthodox Theology in Paris (1969–1973).

He worked at the French National Center for Scientific Research between 1981 and 2008: between 1998 and 2008 he was working with a research team founded by the anthropologist Louis Dumont.

Between 1973 and 2005 Headley repeatedly did fieldwork in central Java, primarily in and around the village of Krendowahono.

Between 2006 and 2010 he taught in Moscow and undertook field work on parish life.

== Books ==
- River of Rituals. An Anthropology of Alternative Rites. Volos Aademny, Greece, 2021.
- The Songs of The Bridal Chamber: Monks at Prayer. Volos Academy, Greece, 2020.
- After Secularization, Religious Faith in Modern Europe, Russia and Asia. St. Sebastian Press, Los Angeles, 2020.
- Du Désert et du Paradis. Introduction à la Théologie Ascétique. Paris: Editions du Cerf. 2018
- The Hidden Ear of God. A Christian Anthropology of Verbal Icons and Iconic Words. New York: Angelico Press. 2018.
- Christ after Communism: Spiritual Authority and it Transmission in Three Parishes in Moscow. Orthodox Research Institute, Rollingsford. 2010.
- Durga’s Mosque : Cosmology, Conversion and Community in central Javanese Islam. Institute of South East Asian Studies, Singapore. 2004. Durga's Mosque was labeled a 2006 Outstanding Academic Title by the Association of College and Research Libraries, American Library Association. ISBN 978-981-230-242-7
  - Review, Indonesia. no. 80, (2005): 197-202
  - Review Homme
- From Cosmogony to Exorcism in a Javanese Genesis. The Spilt Seed. Oxford Studies in Social and Cultural Anthropology, Oxford University Press. 2000.
  - Review, American Anthropologist, Dec., 2002, vol. 104, no. 4, p. 1242
  - Review, Journal of Asian Studies, Aug., 2004, vol. 63, no. 3, p. 847-849

== Edited volume ==
- Stephen C. Headley (ed) Moitiés d’hommes: thematic issue of the review l’Homme (Issue 174, April–June, 2005). Contains two chapters by Headley.
- Stephen C. Headley et David Parkin (eds), Islamic Prayer across the Indian Ocean. Inside and Outside the Mosque. 2000. Curzon Press, United Kingdom. ISBN 978-0-7007-1234-2
- Stephen C. Headley (ed), Vers une anthropologie de la prière. Etudes ethnolinguistiques javanaises. 1996. Publications Universitaires de Provence, Aix-en-Provence. Contains three chapters by Headley.
  - Review, Journal of Asian Studies, Nov 1997, vol. 56, no. 4, p. 1165-1167
- Stephen C. Headley (ed), Anthropologie de la prière : rites oraux en Asie du Sud-Est. Thematic issue of the review L’Homme. Issue 132, vol. XXIV, Oct-Dec, 1994.
