= Black Heath =

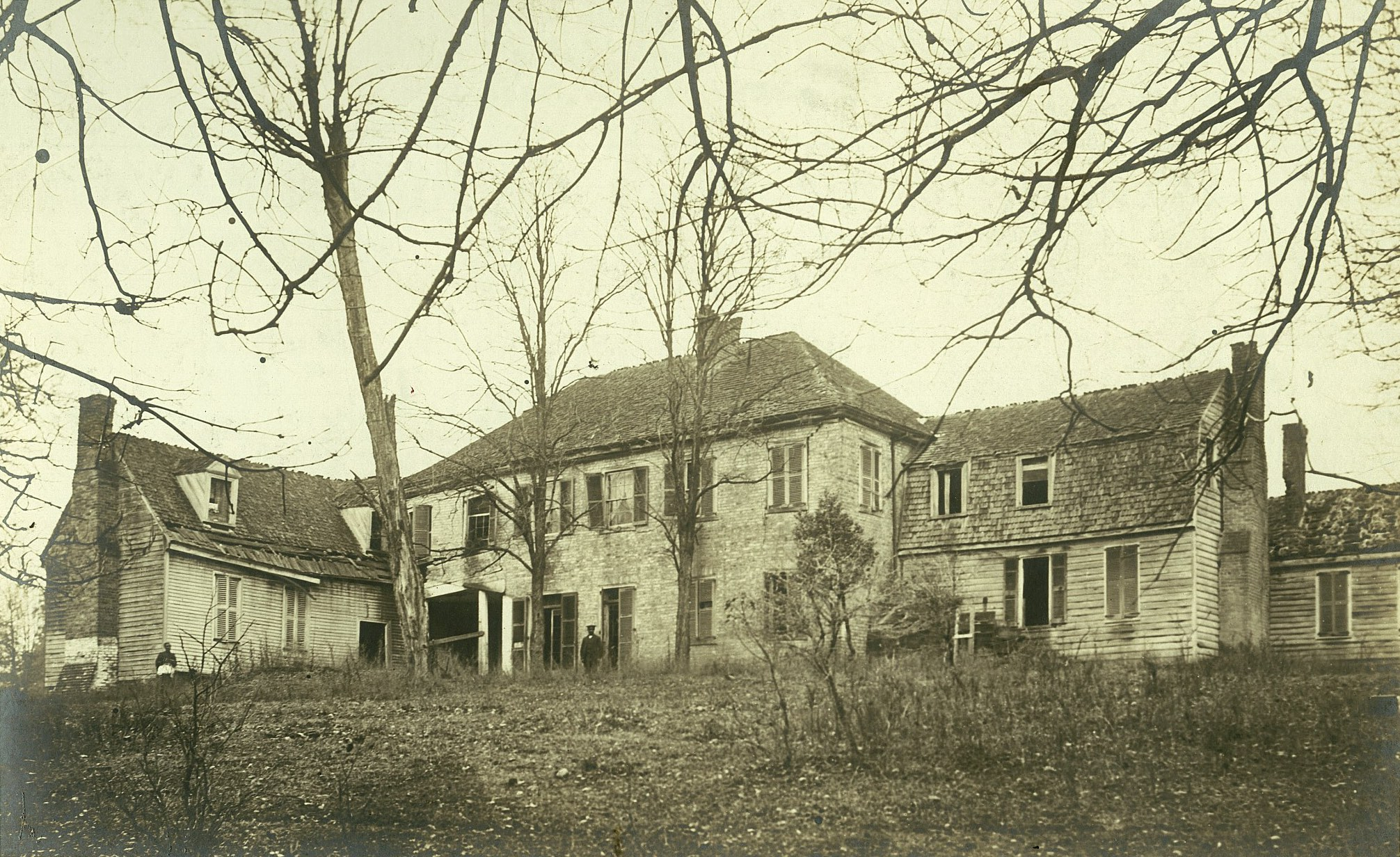
- Black Heath house in disrepair, c. 1890–1915
- Interactive map of the Black Heath area

General information
- Architectural style: Georgian
- Location: 1.5 miles northeast of Midlothian, Virginia
- Coordinates: 37.519822°N 77.632002°W
- Completed: early 1800s

Black Heath was a house and coal mine located near the present day Midlothian area of Chesterfield County, Virginia. The Black Heath coal mining enterprises were operated intermittently from the early 1780s until 1939 and were most notably run by the Heth family from 1795 until 1840, who also built the mansion house in the early 1800s. During the early tenure of the Heths' operation, the Black Heath mines were one of the largest producers of coal in the United States and supplied coal to the White House during US President Thomas Jefferson's term. In 1840, control shifted to an English group of investors who oversaw the mines at a distance until 1888, when they were sold to another interest which soon went into trusteeship. During the 1910s or 1920s, the Black Heath house collapsed due to severe undermining from the numerous coal shafts and tunnels scattered around the property. In 1938, the Black Heath land was sold to coal mining interests who soon went into trusteeship and default like many others before them. Over the next few decades, the land sat idle until 1971, when it began to be parceled off into housing developments.

== House and land ==
The mansion of Black Heath was large and grand and in its early days said to have been "surrounded by all the appurtenances of a home of wealth and taste." The house had four distinct sections arranged in an "L" shape. The leftmost section was three bays wide, (Note: This section was likely more than three bays wide, as it appeared to mesh into the main section.) 1.5 stories tall, and had a gable roof. The next section was the main section of Black Heath, as it was the largest and the only one built of brick (the rest being made of frame wood), and was 6 bays wide, 2 stories tall, had a hipped roof, and had a unique central chimney. The next section was three bays wide, two stories tall, meshed into the rear of the house on the right side, and had a gambrel roof. The fourth and last section was probably two bays wide, one story tall, and had a gable roof. The mix of three types of roofs (gable, hipped, and gambrel) seems odd but was not unseen in Virginia. For example, the Byrd family plantation house, Westover, has these three roof types as well. The grounds were beautifully managed in the Heth era and had various features such as a flower garden, an oak grove, a circular brick dovecote, stables, a barn, and other outbuildings.

The house was built near the brink of a steep cliff which rose about 50 feet from a creek that had its mouth at Falling Creek half a mile away. The tract of Black Heath was near where coal was first discovered in North America in 1701 five miles northwest at Manakintowne in modern-day Powhatan County. During Harry Heth's ownership of Black Heath, he sank a number of shafts on the property, one of which is supposed to have been the foundation for the eponymous pond which existed on the property from at least the 1860s until the late 1980s and was located within 400 to 500 feet south of the house. The origin of the name "Black Heath" is not fully known. It was most likely due to either of the following reasons: 1) it was derived from the color of coal and the Heth family name, or 2) Harry Heth's family had English roots and so the name could have been related to Blackheath near London. The acreage size of the tract of Black Heath was reported at various sizes throughout the years, being 97 acres in the 1760s to 1770s, 99.5 acres in the early 1800s, 99 acres in the later 1800s, and 98.7 acres in 1938 when it was split into two tracts of 82.1 and 16.6 acres each.

== History ==
=== 1705–1795 ===
The land on which Black Heath was built was originally part of a land grant to John Tullitt made by the Crown on November 2, 1705. He received 17,653 acres of land in Henrico County south of the James River (in what is today Chesterfield County) for sponsoring the passage of 353 settlers (at a rate of 50 acres per person). These settlers may have been Huguenot refugees, many of whom later settled in an area known as Manakintown northwest of Tullit's land grant. This vast tract of land, although recorded as having 17,653 acres, actually had at least 27,500 acres based on the locations of the survey posts and lines seen from satellite imagery today. When Hannah Brummall Tullitt, the widow of John Tullitt, died in 1737, she left land near Falling Creek with coal pits to her brother John's children. John Brummall was the great-grandfather of Elijah Brummall, a local coal mine owner in the early 1800s and the owner of Aetna Hill, a house built in 1791 that was 0.7 miles southwest of Black Heath.

It is unknown who the land on which Black Heath stood immediately passed to after John Tullit's ownership, but it later was part of a 497-acre tract owned by Colonel John Bolling. Before 1749, Bolling sold this tract to Andrew Ammonett, (Note: Alternative spellings of this last name include Amonet, Ammonet, and Ammonette.) a Huguenot himself who had traveled to Virginia as a young boy with his family. Ammonett married Jane Morrisett, daughter of Pierre Morrisett and Elizabeth Faure, and together they had nine children: Charles, John, William, Jacob, Andrew, Judith, Jane, Elizabeth, and Magdalene. In Ammonett's will, dated September 2, 1761, he divided up his plantation between his five sons with John receiving 97 acres and William, Jacob, Andrew, and Charles each receiving 100 acres. John's tract of 97 acres was bounded by "the lines of George Sowell and Joshua Trabue" and later became known as the "Black Heath" tract during Harry Heth's ownership.

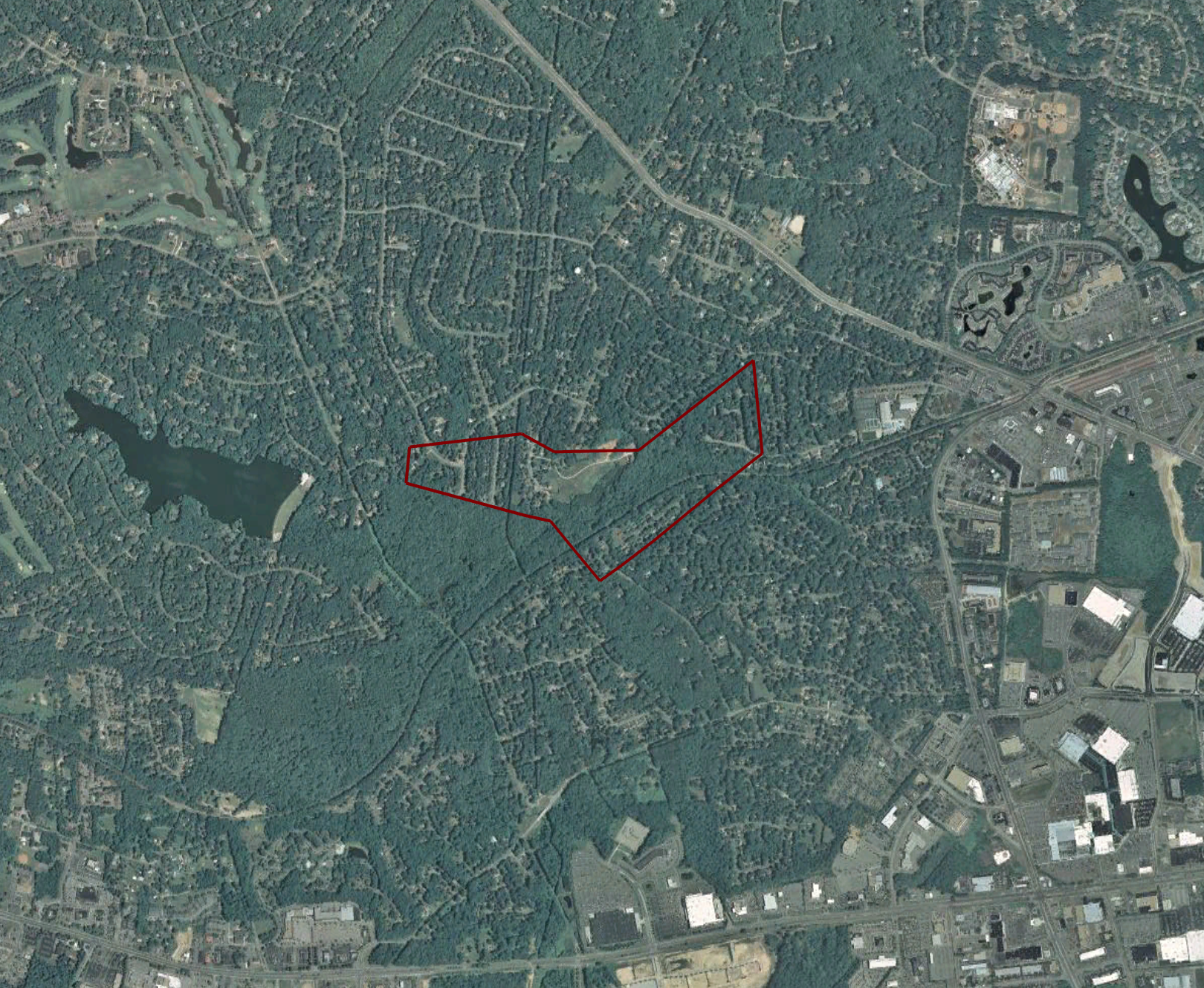
Black Heath tract boundaries

In December 1778, John Ammonett sold this tract to the same George Sowell who owned land that adjoined it. Sowell was also listed as a witness in Andrew Ammonett's will. Shortly thereafter, however, Sowell died. The following month, January 1779, George Sowell's widow, Mary; his son, Thomas; and Thomas' wife, Anne; sold the 97-acre tract to William Ronald of neighboring Powhatan County for £16,005, with £16,000 going to Thomas and Anne and £5 going to Mary. The land being transferred contains this interesting description: "with all [illegible] the mines, minerals, quarries, coalpits or coal which therein lieth or which at any point heretofore hath been, or hereafter shall and may be found or discovered therein or in any part thereof." Ronald did not intend to live on the tract, as his main plantation was in Powhatan, but rather desired to raise coal from it. He did so for about a decade but his finances were at such a state in 1788 that he had to mortgage the land (then estimated at 99.5 acres) for £1,090 and 10 shillings. In 1793, Ronald died, and a suit was brought by Samuel Swann, who held the mortgage on the land, against William Bentley, Ronald's administrator, to either pay the mortgage money or sell the land. A decree was delivered in 1795 which stated that the land must be sold by a certain unless the money was paid and accordingly, the land was bought by Henry "Harry" Heth and John Stewart, partners in a firm known as Heth and Stewart instituted in 1786. They paid 3,150 pounds for the tract, of which 1,486 pounds, 1 shilling, and 4 pence were paid to Samuel Swann and 1,663 pounds, 18 shillings, and 8 pence to William Bentley. Soon after, Heth and Stewart began raising coal. Stewart exited the business by 1797, leaving Heth as the sole owner of the land. The first time the name "Black Heath" was mentioned was in 1800, when James Ping was hired as the manager of the coal pits.

=== 1795–1850 ===
The Black Heath house, or at least the majority of it, was presumably built after Heth bought the land in 1796. Before then, Heth had primarily lived in Richmond and Manchester and perhaps desired to live and raise his growing family in a more rural setting. It is also possible that the house was built in sections, as there are four distinct sections of the house. As a result of his successful coal mine operations, Heth became very wealthy. Although his family had immigrated to America relatively recently in the middle of the 18th century, Heth's children married people with historic Virginia names of Randolph, Harrison, and Pickett. At the end of his life, he owned numerous plantations, including Black Heath, Curles, and Norwood and made provisions in his will for each of his four daughters to receive $10,000 each.

In January 1821, Harry Heth died of consumption in Savannah, Georgia, where he had arrived after a stay in Europe for the improvement of his health. In his will, Heth gave the Black Heath house and surface land to his eldest son, Henry. The subsurface land was willed to the co partnership consisting of Harry's three sons, Henry, John, and Beverly, and his son in law, Beverly Randolph. This partnership was set up to continue the Heth family coal business. Henry Heth was born in 1793/4 in Richmond. Not much is known about his life, except that he married Eliza Ann Cunliffe, the daughter of a neighboring coal mine owner named John Cunliffe (1758–1824), on January 4, 1815, in Chesterfield County, most likely at Black Heath. During the War of 1812, Henry served as a sergeant major under his father in the 1st Regiment (Heth's) Cavalry, Virginia Militia. After the war, Henry probably came to help his father in the coal business and in the 1820 US Census he is recorded as having 44 male slaves and 4 female slaves. In 1821, his father, Harry, died and Henry inherited the plantation Black Heath. He lived there until he also died, four years later, in January 1825. In his will, Henry left everything he owned to his wife, Eliza. She later married an influential Richmond businessman named Holden Rhodes in 1833 and moved to an estate which was later developed into Forest Hill Park.

It is not entirely clear how the Black Heath house passed from Eliza Heth to her brother-in-law, John Heth, but by any measure, John and his wife Margaret were living at Black Heath in December 1825 when their third child and first son, another Henry Heth, was born. John Heth had been a midshipman in the United States Navy during the War of 1812 but resigned in 1822 to marry Margaret Pickett and take a more active role within the family coal business. John had eleven children with Margaret between 1823 and 1842, including the afore mentioned Henry Heth, who graduated from West Point in 1847 and served as a Confederate Major General during the Civil War.

In 1833, John Heth incorporated the Black Heath Company of Colliers with his brother, Beverley Heth, and brother-in-law, Robert Beverley Randolph. This company was the first incorporated coal mining company in the state of Virginia. Included in its assets By 1840, John owned most of the three thousand shares of stock and went to England to advertise for a new company to English investors. This new company was formed in 1841 and was called the Chesterfield Coal and Iron Mining Company (locally known as the "English Company"). Unfortunately, after returning from England in 1842, John Heth died at Norwood Plantation on April 30. He left his wife and 10 young children with ages varying between 19 years and one month. Major General Henry Heth, John Heth's third child and eldest son, wrote later in his life that the period after his father's death was "the most severe calamity I had ever felt." When 17-year-old Henry reported to the military academy at West Point in 1842, he described his family as "badly off" and in "reduced circumstances." John Heth's widow Margaret continued living at Black Heath until she died in 1850, around which point A. F. D. Gifford took up residence in the house.

=== 1850–present ===
A. F. D. Gifford (A. F. D. is for Adolphus Frederick Danberry) was a widowed Englishman who initially came to Virginia as the attorney for the Chesterfield Coal and Iron Mining Company. However, the company had declined since 1844 when a major explosion had killed 11 miners. Gifford later became the vice president of the Richmond and Danville Railroad and was involved in local politics. In 1845, he married Mary Ann Johnson, daughter of the Virginia lawyer Chapman Johnson. They had three children between 1847 and 1853 and also took care of Mary Ann's deceased brother Carter Page Johnson's two children. Before moving into Black Heath around the 1850s, Gifford lived in a house closer to Midlothian off of the Buckingham road between Falling Creek and the village. In 1850, A. F. D. Gifford had 124 slaves (119 men and boys and 5 women and girls), making him a very wealthy man and in 1861, he had two slave children. During the first couple years of the Civil War, Gifford traveled to England in an attempt to secure munitions for the Confederate Army. Upon his return to Virginia in January 1862, however, his ship sunk, probably while trying to run the Union blockade. Gifford's death led to his widow, Mary Gifford, becoming dependent. She, along with many other Southern dependent women, had to apply for a job "signing and numbering Confederate notes" at the Confederate States Treasury office.

With A. F. D. Gifford's death, Black Heath laid dormant until William B. Ball (B. is for Bernard) assumed residence and became the last known occupant of the estate. In the June 20, 1868, issue of the Richmond Daily Dispatch, William B. Ball is listed as the administrator of A. F. D. Gifford and probably moved into Black Heath when the impoverished Gifford family moved out. W. B. Ball graduated from Jefferson Medical College and was a local doctor who served in the Midlothian area of Chesterfield County. At one point he was also one of three company doctors for the Midlothian Coal Mining Company. When the Civil War broke out he became a captain in Company B in the 4th Virginia Cavalry of the Confederate States Army. By 1862, he had been promoted to colonel. After the war, he was a surgeon in Chesterfield County and the state commissioner of fish culture. He died on January 10, 1872, at the Exchange Hotel in Richmond. His wife died 28 years later, on April 4, 1900, in Richmond. Col. William B. Ball's administrator was Clarence H. Flournoy, sheriff of Chesterfield County. C. H. Flournoy was from a prominent Huguenot Chesterfield family and was the sheriff of Chesterfield County from 1872 to 1880.

After Ball's death, the history of the Black Heath house is unknown. The land around the house was leased out at various times by the CC&IM Co., which had given up active mining in 1854 after a series of deadly explosions. In 1869, the company appointed Alexander Macon "A. M." Trabue as receiver and local agent to sell or lease the property. Advertisements were put out in Richmond newspapers that summer, but no sale occurred. Over the next decade, some tracts of mine land were worked, but by 1880, the company's land had been turned over to Charles S. Williams and Aubin S. Bouleware with instructions to sell the property. Eight years later, Ware B. Gay of Boston finally purchased the land at a cost of $30,000, much less than the CC&IM Co.'s cost of $300,000 in 1842, 40 years earlier. In 1890, Gay organized the Southern Coal and Iron Company with a capitalization of $100,000 but went into trusteeship the following year. The deed to the former CC&IM Co. lands was then held by the Central Trust Company of New York from 1891 until 1938, when it was purchased by Ada Irene Jones for $150,000 in bonds. Jones was a 58 year old widow living in Richmond and came from a family of miners. Her purchase included the 1,250 acres of CC&IM Co. lands, which had first been parceled together by John Heth in the 1830s; the Gowrie tract, consisting of 100 acres; and the Etna tract, consisting of 75 acres.

In 1915, Black Heath was still standing but had been deserted for decades and was beginning to see the effects of more than a century of mine activity. During the late 1910s or 1920s, Black Heath collapsed as a result of an underground tunnel collapsing far below. This had also happened at the Old Mount Pisgah United Methodist Church located at the corner of the current Midlothian Turnpike and the old Buckingham Road, forcing the church to move to its present location along Mount Pisgah Drive. The house remained in ruins for the next few decades before falling prey to either new mining operations, commercial waste dumping, or residential development.

Coal mining returned to the region in 1936, when Northern capitalists began investigating the prospect of mining more coal from the area. In April of the following year, they had begun mining. In October 1938, Jones sold 310.4 acres of her land to the B&H Finance Corp. and E. J. (Ewell Jackson) and Annie Flippo. The 310.4 acres was made up of three parcels: the Black Heath tract, divided into two tracts of 16.6 acres (the area south of the railroad) and 82.1 acres (the area north of the railroad), and the Harvie and Harris tract, made up of 211.7 acres. The B&H Finance Corp. was a company set up by Marion Bryan Carson and B. L. Wilder, both of Daytona Beach, Florida, while E. J. Flippo was another Florida businessman.

On October 28, 1938, a dragline crane began excavating a channel to drain the old Black Heath pond. About two weeks later, the crane ran into a bed of shale that was too hard to dig through. Also, the road to the Black Heath mine was blocked by an adjoining mining firm called National Industrial Engineers, Inc. (NIE), who claimed that Carson and his firm had no right to use the road running through their land. An injunction was issued by local judge Willis D. Miller which allowed Carson's men to continue working. By December 8, NIE sued E. J. Flippo (the owner of the Black Heath, Harvie and Harris, and Barker and Branch tracts) for $150,000 in damages. NIE had leased the Barker and Branch tract from Flippo and alleged that by misrepresenting the boundaries of the tract, Flippo had caused NIE to lose close to $150,000 in development costs and lost profits. The result of the suit is not known. Carson was further delayed by the removal of the injunction allowing him to use the road, which put his operation at a standstill. In July 1939, the B&H Finance Corporation mortgaged their land for $3,100. Upon default of this mortgage in May 1940, the three tracts of land making up the Black Heath and Harvie and Harris lands were sold back to Ada Irene Jones, who immediately sold them to the Cogito Construction Company. Cogito Construction was a company owned and operated by Joseph Cogito, who the land devolved to in 1943.

Other operations took place nearby on the Buck and Cunliffe tract, directly adjoining the Black Heath tract to the west, during which large strip mining pits were dug and later filled up with rainwater. These pits remain to the present day and have resulted in a large swath of forest in Midlothian with no foreseeable development future because of the mine land usage.

A WPA Federal Writers' Project guidebook published in 1940 indicates that the site of the Black Heath house was in "dense undergrowth". This same guidebook also tells that to get to the site of Black Heath, a traveler going west on US Route 60 (Midlothian Turnpike) must turn right (north) onto State Route 147 (Huguenot Road). After going 0.5 miles, Black Heath was on the left. In the present day, 0.5 miles north of Midlothian Turnpike on Huguenot Road on the left leads a traveler to another road called Olde Coach Drive, which is 0.3 miles north of Old Buckingham Road.

In 1957, the three tracts of land were sold by Cogito to Paul Duke, a local journalist who had grown up in Richmond and later went on to become extremely successful in Washington, D.C., hosting Washington Week in Review on PBS for twenty years. In 1971, Duke sold the section of the Black Heath tract south of the Southern Railway to the 1314 West Main Pension Plan, a development interest of J. K. Timmons, who was also responsible for the development of Salisbury. This section was developed as a subdivision called Black Heath and has nearby roads with relevant names such as Heathmere Crescent, Heathmere Court, Black Heath Road, and Olde Coalmine Road. The northeastern section of the Black Heath tract was sold in 1983 to the Briarwood development while the rest of the land was sold throughout the 1980s and 1990s to the Roxshire development.

== Coal ==
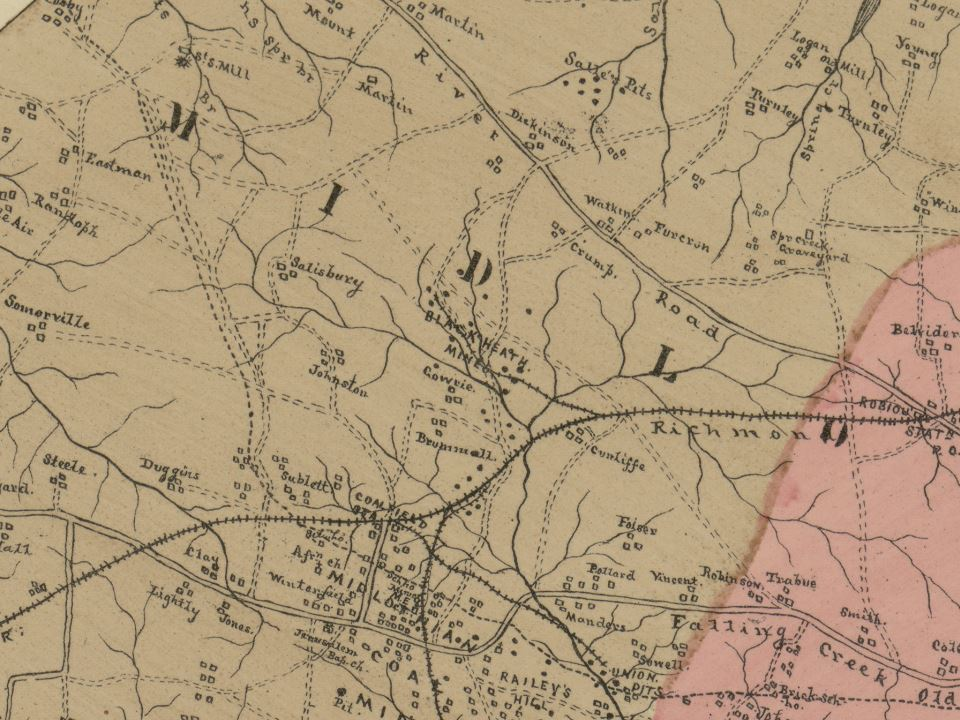
This 1888 map shows the location of the Black Heath mines south of present-day Robious Road east of the Salisbury House between the Coalfield Station and Robious Station on the Richmond and Danville rail line.

The geology of the area about 10 miles (16 km) west of the fall line of the James River near present-day Richmond, Virginia includes a basin of coal which was one of the earliest mined in the Virginia Colony. This natural resource was mined by the French Huguenot refugees who settled there and others beginning around 1700.

By the second quarter of the 18th century, a number of private coal pits were operating on a commercial scale in a coalfield located in the area now known as Midlothian. Miners immigrated to Chesterfield from Wales, England and Scotland. The Wooldridge family from East Lothian in Scotland was among the first to undertake coal mining in the area. The mining community was originally called Coalfield after Coalfield Station, a railroad station on the Richmond and Danville Railroad (now Norfolk Southern Railway). Eventually the name changed from Coalfield Village to Midlothian Village, named after the Wooldridge brothers' Mid-Lothian Coal Mining Company and Abraham S. Wooldridge's house, Midlothian. The Heths, beginning with Colonel Henry "Harry" Heth, who was born about 1760, opened coal pits in the county as early as 1785.

Black Heath was the name of a coal basin and also of some mines located in this basin. Mining operations started there in 1785 or 1788. The basin was of an oval shape extending north and south and is at times 40 feet thick. The most famous mine and eponym of the Black Heath basin was the Black Heath pit. There is uncertainty about the date coal was found and when it was first mined. A Hessian doctor, after fighting in the American Revolutionary War, traveled around the new country in 1783 to 1784 and wrote about preliminary operations of the Black Heath mines. U.S. President Thomas Jefferson had the White House in Washington, D.C. heated with the high quality coal from the Black Heath mines. Commenting on the area's coal in his Notes on the State of Virginia, written in 1781–82, then-Governor Jefferson stated: "The country on James river, from 15 to 20 miles above Richmond, and for several miles northward and southward, is replete with mineral coal of a very excellent quality." Jefferson was also referring not only to the Midlothian area, but also to the area of western Henrico County adjacent across the James River near Gayton and Deep Run. There were three shafts in the Black Heath mine and at the bottom of each tunnels connected each shaft.

Sometime between 1810 and 1830, the Black Heath pits were worked out and abandoned, later having disastrous consequences for the Black Heath house. Later, the nearby Maidenhead pits were known as the Black Heath pits as a result of the association with the Heth coal mining company, the Black Heath Company of Colliers. This company was the idea of the three living members of a four-man partnership set up by Harry Heth before his death in 1821. These men, Beverley Randolph, his brother-in-law John Heth, and Heth's younger brother Beverley, petitioned the Virginia General Assembly on January 25, 1832, for the first coal mining corporation to be chartered in Virginia. After substantial opposition to the concept, this was accomplished the following year on February 20, 1833, with the incorporation of the Black Heath Company of Colliers. All of these men had experience in the coal trade. In 1827, Beverley Randolph had also been one of the organizers of the Chesterfield Railroad, a 12-mile gravity line built from Falling Creek to Manchester for the purpose of transporting coal to ships in the navigable portion of the James River for export. Opened in 1831, it was the first commercial railroad in Virginia and second in the United States.

The Maidenhead pits had been discovered and opened in 1821 and had many shafts sunk into the property ranging from 150 to 700 feet deep. Some explosions occurred in these mines prior to 1839. The two major and deepest shafts were 700 feet deep (the 1839 explosion happened in this shaft) and 600 feet deep (this shaft was completed in 1840). The coal from these mines was about 36 feet in thickness and in 1841 the Maidenhead mines were estimated to produce 2 million bushels of coal per year (at the rate of 1 bushel = 80 pounds, this would be 80,000 tons per year and about 219 tons a day).

In early 1836 a petition was made to the Virginia legislature asking "for a charter for a Rail-Road, from the Pits of the Black Heath Company of Colliers to James River, at some point above Bosher's Dam." This railroad, officially called the James river and Blackheath rail-road, was laid out and began construction in the summer of 1837. The route ran downhill from the Maidenhead mines to the James River and intersected the Salle Pits. From there, the coal would be taken across the river and down the Kanawha Canal to Richmond to be sold. This railroad lasted from 1838 to approximately 1850 and was around 3 to 4 miles long.

In 1854 the Maidenhead mines closed after one last explosive disaster.

=== Explosions at the Black Heath mines ===
Coal mining at Black Heath was both difficult and dangerous work, and there were many fatal explosions. Around 1810 and 1818, two explosions occurred that killed some miners. On March 18, 1839, 53 men, mostly African American slaves, were killed in a 700-foot shaft at the Black Heath mine.

On June 15, 1844, a mining explosion at Black Heath killed 11 more men. After the second incident, the mine was closed until 1938.

Around 1850, the steam-powered Richmond and Danville Railroad was built through the property of Black Heath. In modern-times, Black Heath Road extends from Old Buckingham Road north through the property on the south of the railroad tracks where a subdivision has been built.

North of the railroad and south of State Route 711 (Robious Road), remnants of the Black Heath coal pits were extant in the 1960s.
