= Anne Everett =

American painter

- Born: 12 April 1943; Virginia, U.S.
- Died: 29 November 2013 (aged 70); Paris
- Occupations: Artist and Icon Painter
- Spouse: Stephen C. Headley
- Children: One son, one daughter

Anne Everett (1943–2013) was an American artist from Richmond, Virginia. She is best known for her work as an abstract expressionist, a colourist, and, after 1995, as an icon painter. The greater part of her 55 years as an artist was spent specialising in the egg tempera technique. Raised in Richmond, Virginia, Everett moved permanently to France in 1969. She died in Paris in 2013 and was buried in Vezelay, Burgundy.

== Student years ==
Everett studied fine arts for four years at the University of Virginia (Mary Washington College) with the painter Julien Binford. She was then awarded a two-year Tiffany Scholarship to further her studies in Paris.

== Artistic development ==
=== Abstract expressionism ===
In the 1960s, Everett developed a keen interest in the compositions of abstract expressionism and was particularly influenced by Milton Avery and Richard Diebenkorn. She studied at the Provincetown Workshop with Robert Motherwell and Helen Frankenthaler.

=== Colourist ===
Influenced by Julian Binford's use of colour, Everett arrived in Paris in 1965 and studied at the Ecole des Beaux Arts with Maurice Biranchon. Her interest in the French colourists, beginning with Pierre Bonnard, developed as she became familiar with works by Pierre Lesieur, the German painter Julius Bissier and the Scottish colourist Elizabeth Blackadder.

After her marriage in New York City 1966 to Stephen C. Headley, an American anthropologist, Everett studied lithography at Columbia University, returning to Paris in 1969 when her husband began his studies at St Sergius Institute of Orthodox Theology. She began to gain a wider recognition and her work was exhibited in almost fifty different galleries in France, the United States and Great Britain, where her work was shown in the London gallery of James Mayor.

In 2014 there were two shows of her work in Vezelay and another major exhibit is planned for July 2015 at the Maison Jules Roy, the former home (and now museum) of writer Jules Roy, who owned one of Everett's paintings. He wrote about her artistic style in July 1980 in L’Yonne Républicaine newspaper, saying that Anne Everett ‘was a true painter who used whatever came within her vision in order to transform it into a symbol by enchantment.’

The art historian, Gregoire Aslanoff, said of her work: 'Contemplating each of her works... one's eye is taken by her unique manner of associating nuances of pigments. Anne Everett knew how to marry, or better still to oppose, complementary colors in an infinitely subtle manner. An orange line or spot surges from an area of dark blue, verging on turquoise and violet. The acid yellow of a lemon exalts the Abyssinian blue that is itself in dialogue with an unexpected, particle of gold leaf.'

=== Egg tempera ===
Everett renounced oil painting in the early 1980s in favour of the egg tempera technique. She no longer worked on canvas, using paper instead. After having taught weekly for several years at the Parisian branch of Parson's School of Art & Design, she gave annual classes from 1992 to 2002 in egg tempera technique at the National Portrait Gallery in London. In her early years, (1960-1970) Everett concentrated on painting in oils - large canvases of nudes whose heads were almost always faceless.

After twenty years of painting in egg tempera on paper, in 1990 she embarked on a third period of artistic development, showing a particular interest in portraiture. One of her most notable projects – a portrait of each inhabitant of Vezelay - was begun in 1989. This collection has often been exhibited and was most recently displayed at the Salle Gothique in Vézelay in August, 2014. In a review of Everett's portraits, Sylvu Abdel-Minem quotes the artist as saying: "I painted people who live together more by chance than by choice and who are as diverse as the colors of a palette."

Everett would eventually bring her interest in colour to Orthodox iconography. During the last fifteen years of her life, she completed the iconostasis of the parish of St Etienne and St Germain in Vézelay, Burgundy, painting some fifty icons (catalogue forthcoming 2014).

== Media and articles ==
- Françoise Lafaix, l'Yonne Républicaine August 13, 2014 : review article of exhibit, Les cent Portraits de Vézelay.
- France 3 Bourgogne, 8pm news broadcast: Les Cent Portraits de Vézelay, August 16, 2014.
- Review of Everett's 1997 exhibit in the Salle Gothique in Vézelay : L’Yonne Républicaine, August 5, 1997, p. 10.
- Review by Patrice Josset in Arts Actualité Magazine, No. 20, reviewing Everett's 1995 show at Les Arcenaulx, Marseille.
- Sylvu Abdel-Minem, a review of Everett's 1990 Vézelay exhibit of One Vézelay Portraits in l’Autre Journal (No. 3, July–August 1990). She quotes the artist as saying, "I painted people who live together more by chance than by choice and who are as diverse as the colors of a palette."
- Rob Lever, USA Abroad, 7 July 1990. A review of One Vézelay Portraits. He quotes the artist's surprise after what she had done because she had never before understood the interest of portraits as an art form, forsaking the commercial quest for near photographic resemblance.
- James Mayor, London gallery owner, wrote of Everett's work: "The term Still Life is indeed inadequate to designate the work of Anne Everett. Her subjects are mundane but warm and always lively. The importance of her works lies in her calm understanding of daily life."
- Bo Tree Productions, California, in their 1980 calendar In Praise of Women Artists consecrated a month to Anne Everett.
