= John Heth =

Virginian naval officer (1798–1842)

Captain John Heth
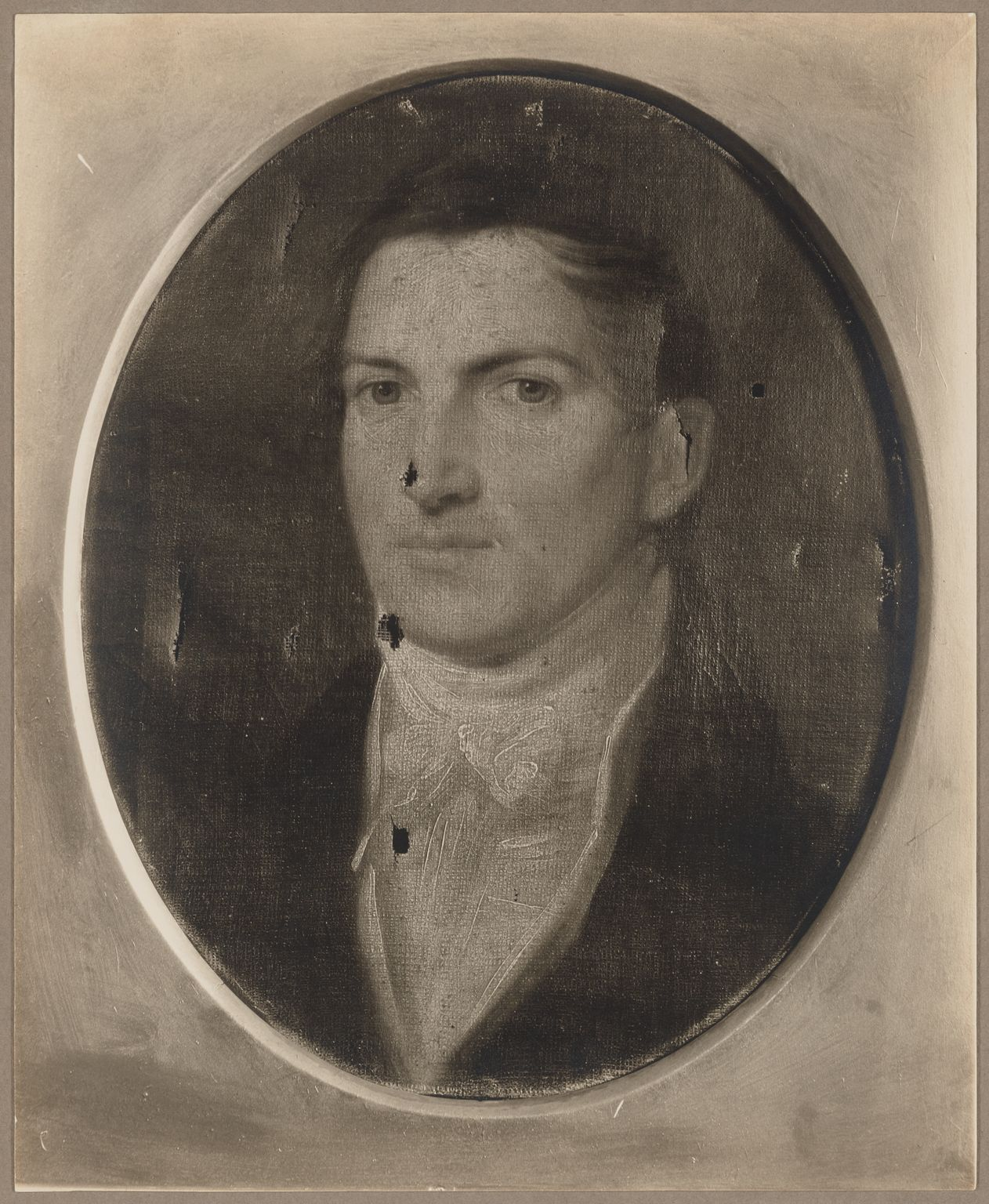
- Portrait by Thomas Sully
- Born: 1798; Black Heath, Virginia, US
- Died: April 30, 1842 (aged 43–44); Norwood, Virginia, US
- Occupations: Owner, Black Heath Coal Mining Enterprises (1821 – 1842)
- Known for: POW, War of 1812
- Children: Henry Heth
- Father: Henry Heth

Captain John Heth (1798 – April 30, 1842) was a Virginian naval officer and businessman in the coal mining industry.

== Biography ==
Heth was born in 1798 at Black Heath estate in Chesterfield County, Virginia. He was the son of Colonel Henry "Harry" Heth, who had fought in the American Revolutionary War and established himself in the coal business in Virginia, and Nancy Hare Heth. He was named for his father's brother, Lt. John Heth, who had also fought in the Revolutionary War and afterwards settled in the Richmond area.

=== War of 1812 ===
John Heth served in the volunteer forces of Virginia as an officer in the U.S. Navy in the War of 1812, achieving the rank of Captain. On January 15, 1815, he was captured with Commodore Stephen Decatur Jr., the commander of the U.S. frigate President and taken to Bermuda with Decatur and his crew as a prisoner of war. With two others, Captain Heth escaped from Bermuda in an open boat.

=== Coal Industry ===
After the war, Heth operated the Black Heath coal pits near present-day Midlothian, a business inherited from his father, who died in 1821. Under his management, the mines expanded and eventually became the standard coal of the U.S. Navy. In 1832, he petitioned the Virginia General Assembly to form the first coal mining corporation in the state, and succeeded, despite protests, the following year. After two serious fatal accidents from explosions in 1839 and 1844, the Black Heath pits were closed until 1938.

=== Family and children ===
Captain Heth married Margaret L. Pickett (1801-1850) of Richmond on May 15, 1822. Pickett was the sister of Robert Pickett, who, with his wife Mary, was the father of Confederate general George Pickett. They had 11 children between 1823 and 1842, including future Confederate Major General Henry Heth, who was born at Black Heath in 1825.

Their 11 children included:

- Margaret Helen Heth (1823-1855), married to Thomas Lynch Hamilton
- Ann Eliza Heth (1824-1825)
- Henry "Harry" Heth (1825-1899), married Harriet C. "Teny" Selden (1834-1907) and had three children
- Lavinia Randolph Heth (1827-1865), married Julien Harrison (1827-1877) and had seven children
- Elizabeth Chevallie Heth (1829-1904), married Thomas Vaden and had seven children
- John Randolph Heth (1834-1890)
- Catherine "Kitty" Heth (1834-1912), married John Cringan Maynard
- Caroline Kemble Heth (1835-1859), married Walter K. Martin
- Mary Ann Heth (1837-1920)
- Beverley Stockton Heth (1839-1927)
- Fanny Cadwallader Heth (1842-?)

== Death ==
Heth died on April 30, 1842, at Norwood Plantation in Powhatan County, Virginia, and was buried there.
