= Robert Porterfield (soldier) =

American politician (1751–1843)

Member of the Virginia House of Delegates from Augusta County
- In office December 8, 1798 – December 1, 1799 Serving with Andrew Anderson
- Preceded by: John Tate
- Succeeded by: Robert Doak

Personal details
- Born: February 22, 1751 Frederick County, Colony of Virginia
- Died: February 13, 1843 (aged 91) Soldier's Rest, Waynesboro, Virginia, US
- Resting place: Thornrose Cemetery, Staunton, Augusta County, Virginia
- Spouse(s): Mary Heth; Rebecca Farrar
- Occupation: officer, Planter, politician

Military service
- Allegiance: United States
- Branch/service: Continental Army; United States Army
- Years of service: 1776–1783; 1784–1815
- Rank: Brigadier General (Virginia Militia)
- Battles/wars: American Revolutionary War; Battle of Saratoga; Battle of Freeman's Farm; Battle of Bemis Heights; Battle of Cowpens; War of 1812

Robert Porterfield (February 22, 1751 – February 13, 1843), (often referred to as "General Porterfield") was a Virginia planter, politician, magistrate and military officer who served in the Virginia House of Delegates representing Augusta County for one term. He is better known for his service in the Virginia Line during the American Revolutionary War, and as Brigadier General led the Virginia militia during the War of 1812.

== Early and family life ==
Porterfield was born in then-vast Frederick County to Vonie Erlene Miller Porterfield, his father Charles Porterfield (1715–1778) having moved his family into the Shenandoah Valley from Pennsylvania. The family also included another son, Charles Porterfield (1750–1781) and a daughter Eleanor (1756–1835), who would marry Lt. Andrew Heth.

Robert Porterfield married twice. His first wife, Mary Heth (1750-before 1784), was the daughter of Henry Heth, an important figure in Frederick County. Following her death, Porterfield remarried, to Rebecca Farrar (1764–1798), daughter of Peter Farrar (1730–1815, who would move to South Carolina) and Margaret Chastaine Cocke (1727–1767). Rebecca bore sons Charles Porterfield (1786–1810) and John Porterfield (1793–1849) and daughters Rebecca Porterfield Kinney (1798–1880) and Mary (Polly) Porterfield Wayland (1789–1852) who survived to adulthood.

== Military career ==
On December 24, 1776, Porterfield accepted his first military commission, as 2nd lieutenant of the 11th Virginia, a unit of frontiersman led by then-Captain Daniel Morgan in the Virginia Line of the Continental Army. He received a promotion to 1st lieutenant on June 1, 1777, then became an Adjutant on April 19, 1778, and transferred to the 7th Virginia on September 14, 1778. Poerterfield was promoted to Captain on August 16, 1779, and taken prisoner at Charleston, South Carolina on May 12, 1780. Upon his furlough, he informed Virginia's governor that his elder brother, Lt. Col. Charles Porterfield, had died on the way to Charleston, as a result of the wound he suffered at the Battle of Camden. He also said that a British officer, Lord Rawdon, had loaned him thirty guineas and treated him with great kindness, and unsuccessfully requested two successive Virginia governors to repay the debt because of his brother's service. After reaching Richmond on parole, Porterfield was transferred to the 2nd Virginia on February 12, 1781, and served until the war's end.

Following the conflict, he moved to Augusta County and was soon named colonel in the state militia, rising to the rank of Brigadier General of Virginia state troops in 1810, despite incurring a fine in 1787 for failing to muster in Captain Thomas Turk's company in Augusta County.

Late in the War of 1812 (July 1814) as British ships raided in Chesapeake Bay, Governor Barbour called up additional troops and created five new brigades. Porterfield was placed in command of one such brigade, which consisted of the 1st Virginia Regiment under Lt. Cols. Charles Yancey and John S. Farrar of Albemarle County (commanding infantry from Albemarle (2 companies), Buckingham, Chesterfield, Fluvanna, Orange and Shenandoah Counties), the 2nd Virginia Regiment under Lt.Col. Thomas Ballowe of Buckingham County (commanding troops from Albemarle, Augusta, Buckingham, Culpeper and Fauquier (2 companies) Counties and Richmond City (2 companies)) and the !st Virginia Cavalry led by Major Henry Heth of Chesterfield County. Porterfield's brigade remained near Richmond, leaving Camp Fairfield on August 28 and re-establishing Camp Holly Springs two days later; Governor Nicholas dissolved it on February 3, 1815. By contrast, the new brigades led by Brig.Gens. Joel Leftwich and James Breckenridge were sent north, to defend Baltimore and Washington; although the new brigades led by Brig.Gens. William Chamberlayne and John H. Cocke also remained near Richmond.

Before that time, assisted by John Howe Peyton as his adjutant, Porterfield organized troops in Augusta County and sent them to the field. Peyton's younger brother, Bernard Peyton, who led U.S. troops during the War of 1812, moved to Richmond after the war and later served decades as Richmond's postmaster, as well as Adjutant General of the Virginia militia.

== Civilian career ==
Porterfield moved to what was then-vast Augusta County in 1783, and established a plantation near Waynesboro he called "Soldier's Retreat". In the Virginia tax census of 1787, he owned four adult slaves, four slaves between 16 and 20 years old, eight cattle, and nine horses (including a stud horse).

Augusta County voters elected Porterfield as one of their representatives to the Virginia House of Delegates in 1798, but he did not again hold that part-time position after completing the one-year term.

In 1811, Porterfield bought stock in a company which planned to build a road between Rockfish Gap and Scott's Landing on the James River, a road that had been legislatively authorized years earlier.

Porterfield served five decades years as a justice of the peace in Augusta county, after serving two terms as the county's sheriff. His son-in-law Robert Kinney, a lawyer, also served as a delegate for Augusta County and several terms as its mayor during Porterfield's lifetime.

== Death and legacy ==
Porterfield survived nine decades and two wives, and died at his Soldiers Rest home, near the unincorporated Augusta County community of Hermitage near Waynesboro, in 1843. A New York newspaper published an obituary for Porterfield as one of the last living Revolutionary War soldiers. He would be buried at Staunton's now historic Thornrose Cemetery, which opened several years later. In 1852, years after Porterfield's death, Virginia's legislature awarded a land grant to his heirs based on his service during the War of 1812. His daughter Rebecca Porterfield Kinney, although she became a widow, would survive the American Civil War, as would several grandchildren, including CSA Pvt. Charles Nicholas Kinney.
