= Henry Heth (businessman) =

Colonel Harry Heth
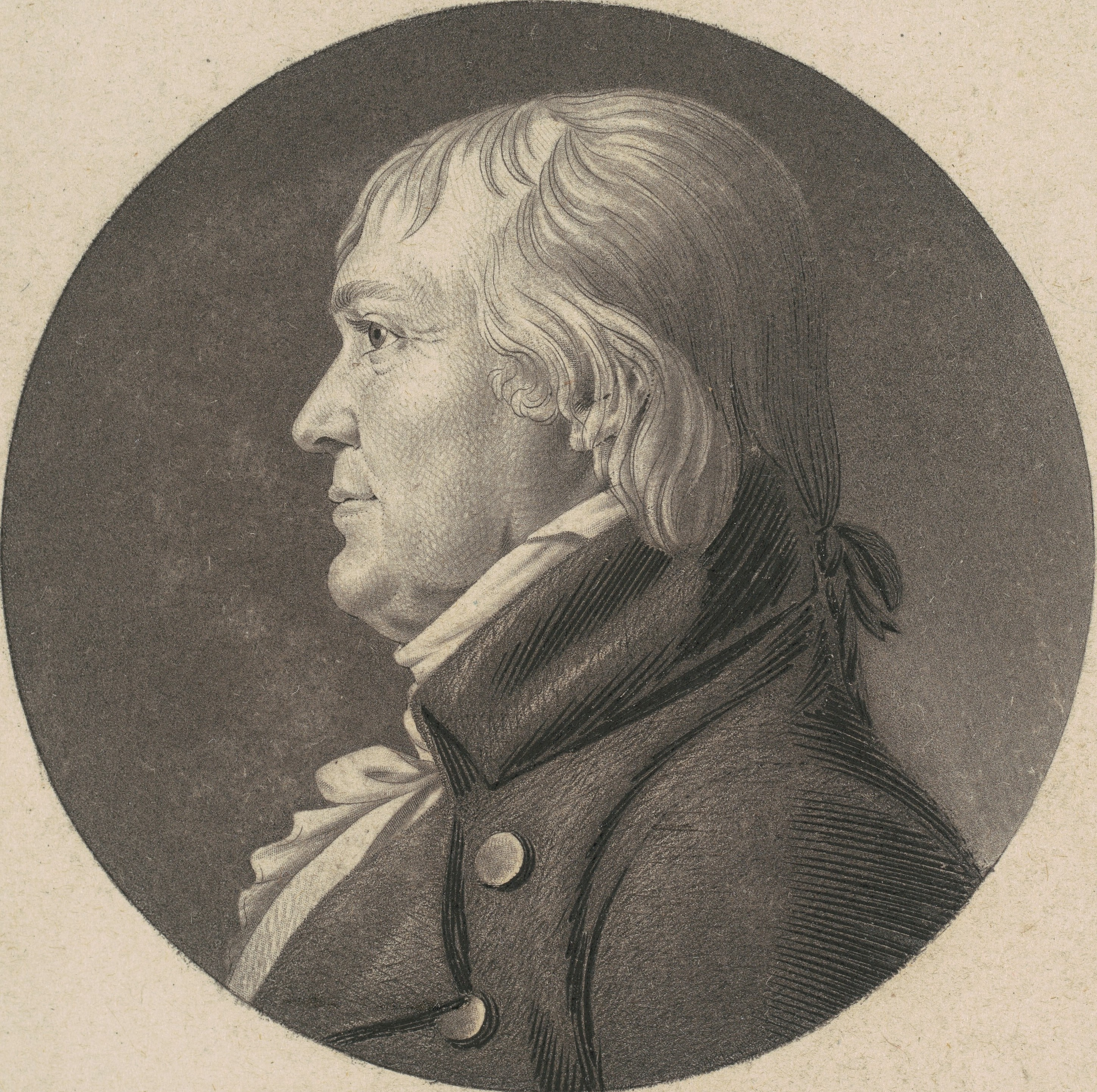
- Harry Heth, 1805
- Born: c.1760 Colony of Virginia
- Died: 1821; Savannah, Georgia
- Occupation: Businessman
- Years active: c.1790–1821
- Spouse: Ann Hare (m. 1787)
- Children: 8, including John Heth

Henry Heth (1764-1822) was a Virginia officer and businessman. After settling in Chesterfield County, Virginia near Richmond circa 1759, he established and ran the Black Heath coal mines following the American Revolutionary War. During that conflict, Heth and his brothers served as officers in the Continental Army and would become founding members of the Society of the Cincinnati. Heth became involved in many commercial activities in Richmond and Norfolk from the late 1790s to his death.

== Family and early life ==
Although one source discussed below attributes him as likely born in the British Colony of Virginia around 1759 to 1772, Heth first appears age 18 years old on a Virginia state census conducted in Richmond in 1782. A 1764 birthdate is also consistent with his age being given as 23 years old on his marriage certificate in 1787.

According to Lyon Gardiner Tyler, Henry Heth came to Virginia from England in 1759 along with his brothers, William and John, and after the American Revolutionary War, all three became charter members of the Society of the Cincinnati. Tyler continued that this Harry Heth (Sr.) served in the American Revolutionary War and had a son, Henry, who served in the War of 1812. This subsequent Henry had a son named John. Another reference states "that John Heth emigrated from the North of Ireland in the earlier half of the eighteenth century" and "settled first in Pennsylvania not far from Pittsburgh".

According to a family history published in 1934, Harry Heth was the son of a man named Henry Heth who was born in Ireland on November 16, 1718. That Henry Heth "came to the colonies from Newgate Prison as an indentured servant". That Henry Heth Sr. married Agnes McMachan around 1749 in Frederick County, Virginia. According to various records, Heth Sr. acquired land near Fort Pitt (modern day Pittsburgh) and when the Revolutionary War broke out, he was a captain of an independent company stationed near Fort Pitt.

In his will dated March 30, 1793, Henry Heth Sr. named his six sons: William, Andrew, John, Henry, Hervy, and Richard. While none of his daughters is explicitly mentioned, Gabriel Peterson (his son-in-law) was a witness and executor. Henry also indicates that some of his children are minors, so at least two children were born in or after 1772. A 1797 land document gives the birth order of Henry's sons living at that time: William, John, Harvey, Henry, and Richard. It appears that Andrew has died. Henry is also listed as having six daughters, among them Mary (wife of Capt. Robert Porterfield) and Anne or Nancy (wife of Lieut., later Col. Josiah Tannehill). Henry Heth Sr. and his sons served in the Continental Army during the American Revolutionary War and received numerous land grants for their service.

== Military service ==
Henry "Harry" Heth served in the Continental Army during the American Revolutionary War. Several points obscure his service. First, his father was named Henry and also served in the army. This senior Heth was the captain of an independent company stationed near Fort Pitt in western Pennsylvania. Another Henry Heth served as a quartermaster for a Virginia regiment during the war. Lastly, Harry may not have been old enough to be a soldier during the Revolutionary War, which technically required recruits to be 16 years old. In a 1782 census of the city of Richmond, he is listed as 18 years old.

Later, beginning in February 1814, during the War of 1812, Captain Henry Heth led a cavalry troop from Chesterfield County, which in August 1814 (as British troops in Chesapeake Bay burned the new national capital and plantations in Virginia and Maryland, this Henry Heth was promoted to Major and his troop attached to General Richard Porterfield's Brigade which remained in the Richmond area to defend the state capital.

== Business career ==
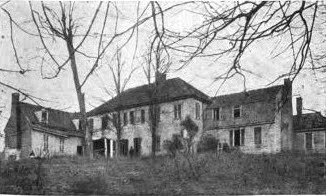
Harry Heth's house, Black Heath

Regardless of whether he served in the Revolutionary War, sometime in the 1780s Heth came to live in the Richmond, Virginia area. In 1795, along with John Stewart, Heth bought a 99.5-acre piece of land upon which the Black Heath coal pits were situated (near modern Midlothian. This was to be the beginning of a 55-year association between the Black Heath pits and the Heth family. Heth began to improve the pits, which until recently had only consisted of shallow pits in the ground, until they were the largest coal pits in the United States. Such was the quality of the coal from Black Heath that President Thomas Jefferson ordered some to be used in heating the White House.

Harry Heth maintained offices in Norfolk and Manchester (across the James River at Richmond), where he engaged in the coal business. Heth owned several coal mines in the area now known as Midlothian in northwestern Chesterfield County. Colonel Heth participated in working the Railey family's coal pits and became the owner of the Black Heath coal pits. Colonel Heth owned slaves, and prior to the American Civil War (and emancipation), the mines were largely worked with African Americans, mostly slaves. Manchester, at the head of navigation on the James River, was the closest export port for Heth's coal.

Enslaved as well as free labor operated the mines or Heth's Chesterfield County farm. In the 1820 census, Henry Heth owned 48 enslaved people in Chesterfield County, including 20 adult males between 26 and 44 years old, 10 males between 14 and 25 years old, 7 men older than 45 years old and 7 boys under 14 years old, and the same census indicated 45 people worked in agriculture.

== Personal life ==
Harry Heth married Nancy Hare (1772–1846) on November 10, 1787, in Richmond. Nancy bore eight children:

- Lavinia R. Heth (1791–1815), married Beverley Randolph and had two children
- Henry Heth (1793–1824), married Eliza Ann Cunliffe (daughter of fellow coal mine owner John Cunliffe)
- Catherine "Kitty" Heth, married Archibald Morgan Harrison (1794–1842) and had three children
- John Heth (1798–1842), married Margaret Leach Pickett (1801–1850) and had eleven children
- Virginia Heth, married Richard E. Cunningham and had no children
- Caroline Heth, married Temple Gwathmey
- Beverley Heth (1807–1842), married Virginia Gwathmey
- Harriet Heth (1810–1848), married Miles Cary Selden (1805–1880) and had eight children

Although Henry Heth Jr. survived his father by two years, his younger brother John Heth (1798–1842), inherited Black Heath, the family house along the (old) Buckingham Road near the Black Heath mines. At this house that his grandson, future Confederate Major General Henry Heth was born in 1825, about four years after Colonel Heth's death in Savannah, Georgia in 1821.
