= Norwood (Powhatan, Virginia) =

Historic house in Virginia, United States

- U.S. National Register of Historic Places
- Virginia Landmarks Register
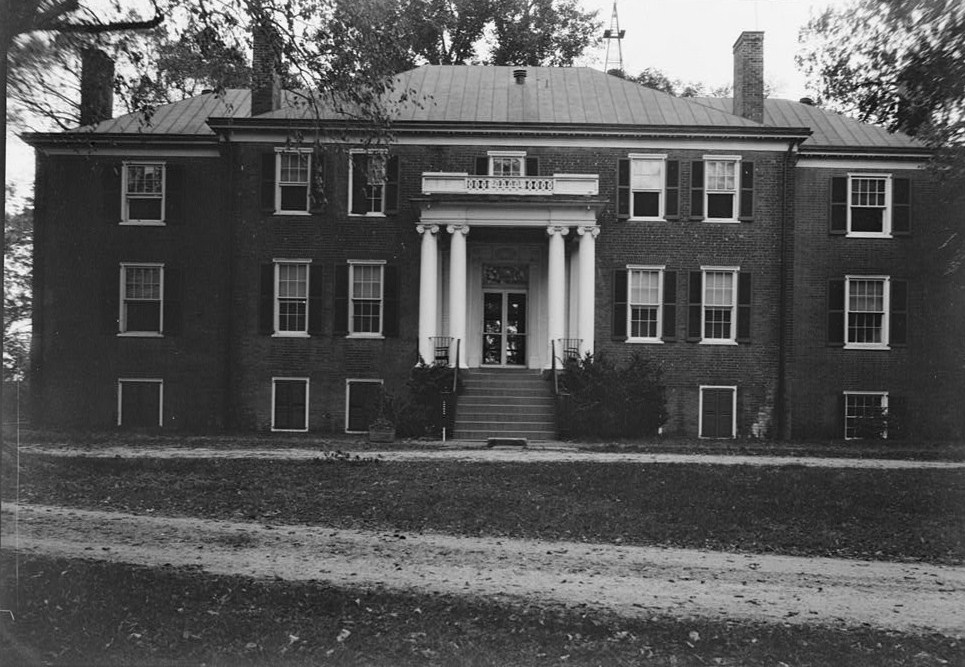
- Norwood, HABS Photo

- Location within Virginia Location within the United States
- Location: NE of Powhatan, near Powhatan, Virginia
- Coordinates: 37°35′05″N 77°44′38″W
- Area: 21 acres (8.5 ha)
- Built: c. 1835
- Architectural style: Federal, Adam Style
- NRHP reference No.: 80004212
- VLR No.: 072-0048

Significant dates
- Added to NRHP: May 19, 1980
- Designated VLR: March 18, 1975

Norwood is a historic plantation house located near Powhatan, Powhatan County, Virginia. It was built in the 18th century and remodeled about 1835. It is a two-story, five-bay, Federal style brick dwelling with a hipped roof. The remodeling included the addition of flanking two-story wings and a two-story rear extension. The front facade features a sheltering porch with coupled Ionic order columns, marble paving, and granite steps. Also on the property are the contributing office, plantation kitchen, and privy.

== Original Norwood ==
The current Norwood plantation is the second of its name in Powhatan County. The first Norwood was located about a mile southeast of the second Norwood, initially called "Greenyard," and was built in the eighteenth century. It was sold in 1813 by the Harris family to Harry Heth, the owner of the Black Heath coal mine in neighboring Chesterfield County. Heth lived at Norwood for the last years of his life and at his death in 1821, he willed it to his son Beverley Heth and his son-in-law, Beverley Randolph. Sometime between this date and 1834, Norwood burned to the ground. Subsequently, Randolph purchased the neighboring plantation "Greenyard" and renamed it Norwood.

== Greenyard ==
Norwood, originally known as "Greenyard," was built circa 1790 by Thomas Harris, who left it to his son John Phillip Barretier Harris when he died in 1815. John Harris sold the 664 and 1/2 acre plantation to Beverley Randolph in 1834 and the deed was conveyed on May 10 of that year. Greenyard, now "Norwood," came to Beverley's daughter Nancy (1811 – 1884) and her two successive husbands: William H. Kennon (1800 – 1843) and Miles Cary Selden (1806 – 1880). At Nancy's death, the house passed to her two eldest sons: Charles R. (1837 – 1904) and William U. Kennon (1843 – 1915) and then to William's son, Charles.

It was added to the National Register of Historic Places in 1980.
